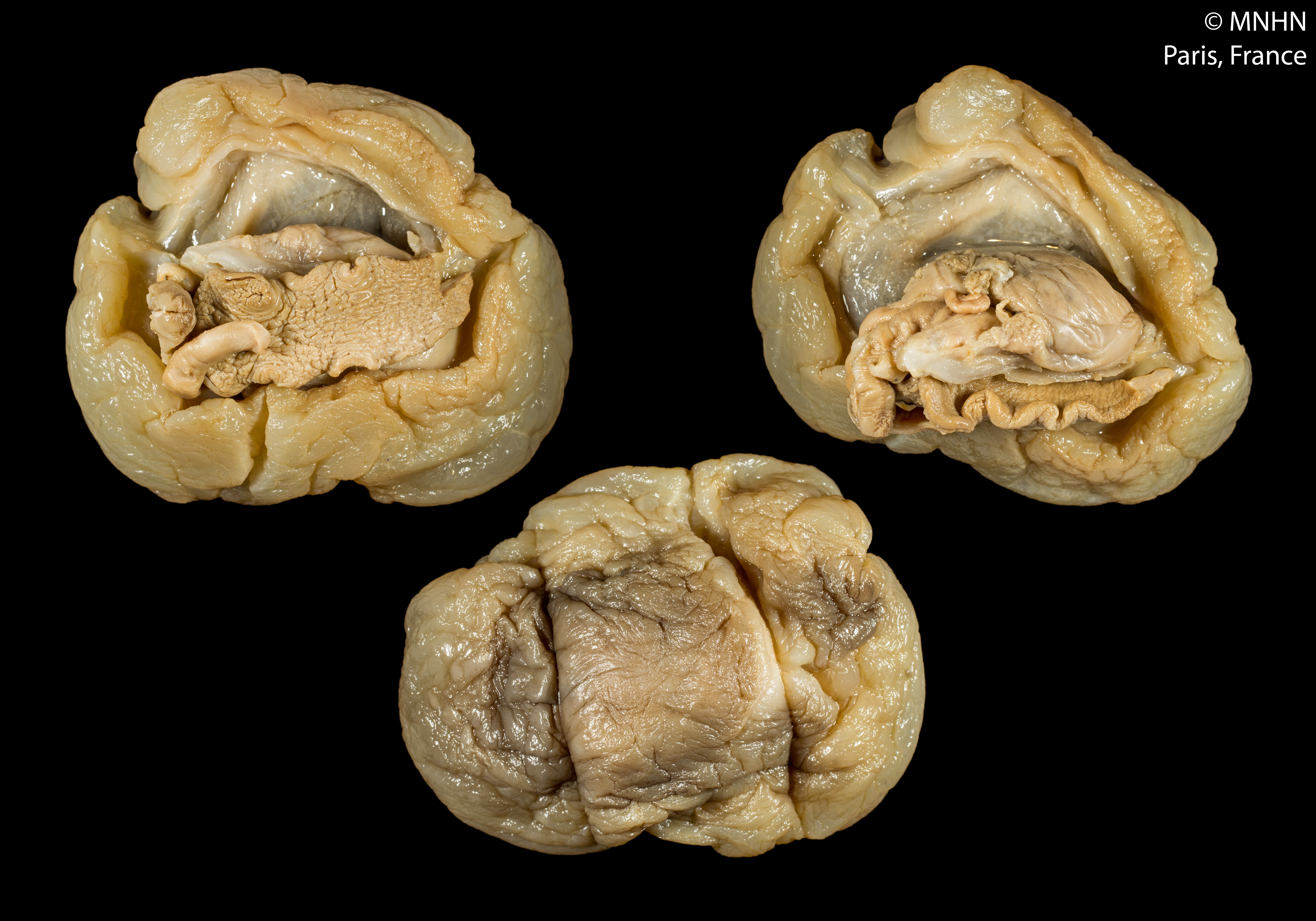
- Marseniopsis antarctica (holotype at MNHN, Paris)

Scientific classification
- Kingdom: Animalia
- Phylum: Mollusca
- Class: Gastropoda
- Subclass: Caenogastropoda
- Order: Littorinimorpha
- Superfamily: Velutinoidea
- Family: Velutinidae
- Genus: Marseniopsis; Bergh, 1886

Type species
- Marseniopsis pacifica Bergh, 1886

= Marseniopsis =

Genus of gastropods

Marseniopsis is a genus of small slug-like sea snails, marine gastropod molluscs in the subfamily Velutininae within the family Velutinidae.

== Characteristics ==
The members in the genus Marseniopsis differ strikingly from other genera in the family Velutinidae. They form a beautiful transitional link between the diclinous (unisexual) and the androgynous (hermaphroditic) groups, such as Marsenina and Onchidiopsis. This connection distinctly demonstrates a unity of relationship.

In their general form, these animals agree with Onchidiopsis. The superior part of the body is hemispherical, appearing as if it were distended, while the mantle margin is thick and swollen. The external mouth lies far forward on the body. However, these specimens possess no right exhalent fold nor any associated semi-canal, and their branchial folia (gills) rather resemble those of the genus Lamellaria.

The mandibular plates are narrower and, on the whole, smaller than those found in other Velutinidae species. The radula, on the other hand, agrees exactly with that of the androgynous forms; notably, outside the lateral teeth, there are two additional hooked plates.

Unlike their androgynous relatives, the species in Marseniopsis have the sexes separate. Their anatomical relations resemble most closely those of the Coriocella. For instance, the inferior portion of the vas deferens does not lie freely within the lower body cavity. Furthermore, the penis most nearly resembles that of the Marsenia proper, and the shell is also, on the whole, like that of the typical Marsenia.

== Species ==
- Marseniopsis antarctica Vayssière, 1906
- Marseniopsis conica (E. A. Smith, 1902)
- Marseniopsis hexalateratus Egorova, 2007
- Marseniopsis innominatus Iredale, 1936
- Marseniopsis mollis (E. A. Smith, 1902)
- Marseniopsis pacifica Bergh, 1886
- Marseniopsis soliditesta Numanami, 1996
- Marseniopsis spherica Numanami, 1996
- Marseniopsis syowaensis Numanami & Okutani, 1991

Taxa inquirenda

- Marseniopsis charcoti Vayssière, 1917
- Marseniopsis murrayi Bergh, 1886
