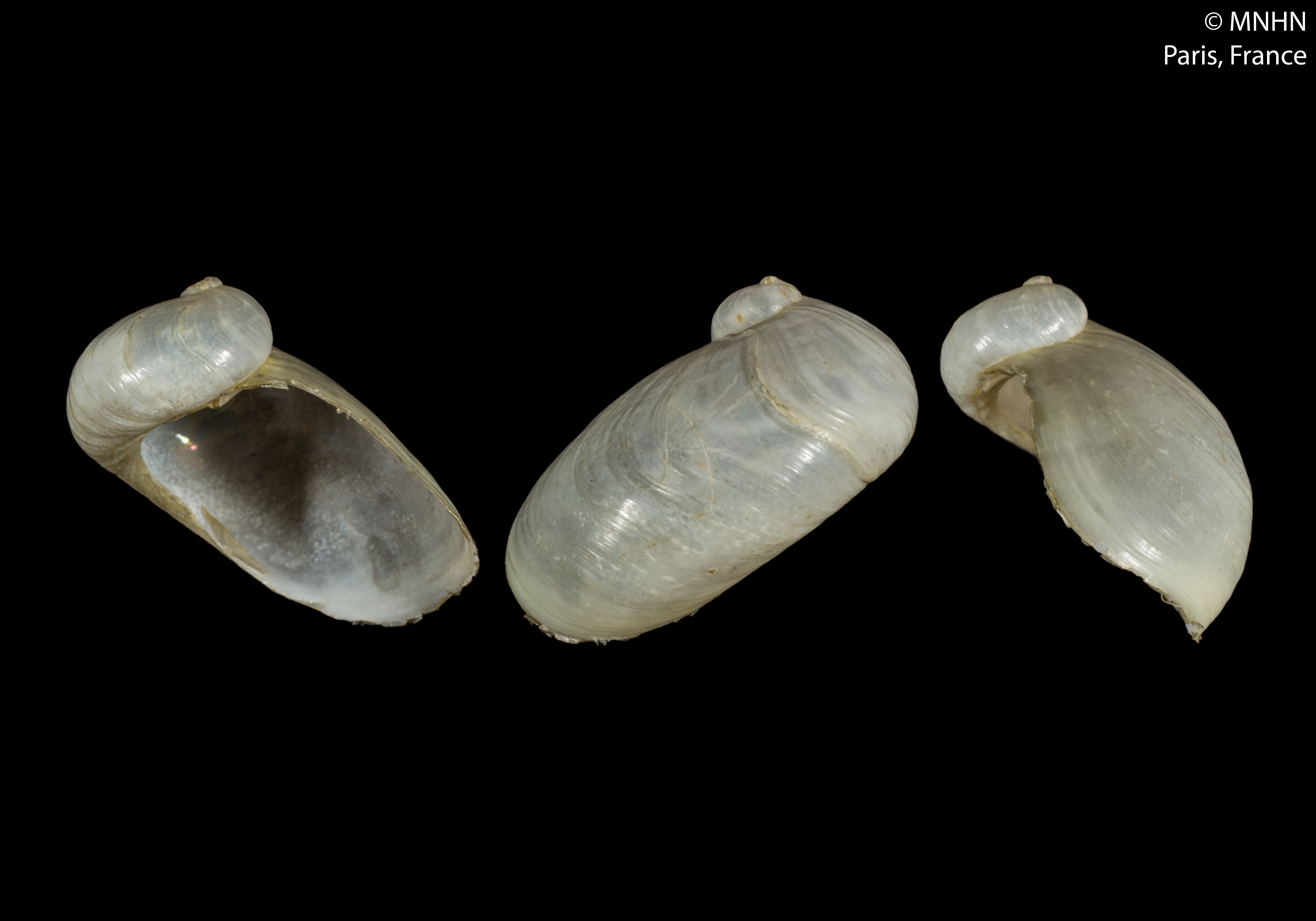
- Shell of Lamellaria berghi (syntype at MNHN, Paris)
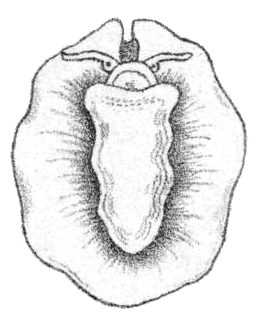
- Drawing of ventral view of live animal of Lamellaria latens

Scientific classification
- Kingdom: Animalia
- Phylum: Mollusca
- Class: Gastropoda
- Subclass: Caenogastropoda
- Order: Littorinimorpha
- Superfamily: Velutinoidea
- Family: Velutinidae
- Subfamily: Lamellariinae
- Genus: Lamellaria; Montagu, 1816

Type species
- Lamellaria tentaculata Montagu, 1816

Synonyms
- Cryptocella H. Adams & A. Adams, 1853; Djiboutia Vayssière, 1912; Lamellaria (Lamellaria) Montagu, 1816; Marsenia Oken, 1823

= Lamellaria =

Genus of gastropods

Lamellaria is a genus of small slug-like sea snails, marine gastropod molluscs in the family Velutinidae.

== Species ==
Species within the genus Lamellaria include:

- Lamellaria ampla Strebel, 1906
- Lamellaria australis Basedow, 1905
- Lamellaria berghi (Deshayes, 1863)
- Lamellaria branca Simone, 2004
- Lamellaria capensis (Bergh, 1907)
- Lamellaria cerebroides Hutton, 1883
- Lamellaria diegoensis Dall, 1885 - San Diego lamellaria
- Lamellaria digueti Rochebrune, 1895
- Lamellaria elata Strebel, 1906
- † Lamellaria falunica de Morgan, 1920
- Lamellaria fernandinae Dall, 1927
- Lamellaria inflata (C.B. Adams, 1852)
- Lamellaria kiiensis Habe, 1944
- Lamellaria koto Schwengel, 1944
- Lamellaria latens (Müller, 1776)
- Lamellaria leptoconcha (Bergh, 1907)
- Lamellaria leucosphaera Schwengel, 1942 - white-ball lamellaria
- Lamellaria mopsicolor Ev. Marcus, 1958
- Lamellaria nodosa Ev. Marcus, 1987
- Lamellaria ophione Gray, 1850
- Lamellaria orbiculata Dall, 1871
- Lamellaria patagonica E. A. Smith, 1881
- Lamellaria perspicua (Linnaeus, 1758) - transparent lamellaria
- Lamellaria punctata (Stimpson, 1855)
- Lamellaria setoensis Habe, 1944

Taxon inquirendum

- Lamellaria hyadesi Mabille & Rochebrune, 1889

Species brought into synonymy

- Lamellaria borealis (Bergh, 1886): synonym of Marseniella borealis Bergh, 1886
- Lamellaria cochinella L. Perry, 1940: synonym of Lamellaria perspicua (Linnaeus, 1758)
- Lamellaria conica E. A. Smith, 1902: synonym of Marseniopsis conica (E. A. Smith, 1902)
- Lamellaria courcellei Rochebrune & Mabille, 1889: synonym of Lamellaria patagonica E. A. Smith, 1881
- Lamellaria dozei Rochebrune & Mabille, 1889: synonym of Lamellaria ampla Strebel, 1906
- Lamellaria farrani Odhner, 1927: synonym of Calyptoconcha pellucida (A. E. Verrill, 1880)
- Lamellaria fuegoensis Strebel, 1906: synonym of Lamellaria patagonica E. A. Smith, 1881
- Lamellaria glacialis M. Sars, 1851: synonym of Onchidiopsis glacialis (M. Sars, 1851)
- Lamellaria gouldii A. E. Verrill, 1882: synonym of Calyptoconcha pellucida (A. E. Verrill, 1880)
- Lamellaria hyadesi Mabille & Rochebrune, 1889: synonym of Lamellaria perspicua (Linnaeus, 1758)
- Lamellaria incerta Bergh, 1898: synonym of Lamellaria perspicua (Linnaeus, 1758)
- Lamellaria kleciachi Brusina, 1866: synonym of Berthella plumula (Montagu, 1803)
- Lamellaria lata Jeffreys, 1867: synonym of Lamellaria latens (O. F. Müller, 1776)
- Lamellaria maculosa Bergh, 1898: synonym of Lamellaria perspicua (Linnaeus, 1758)
- Lamellaria magellanica Strebel, 1906: synonym of Lamellaria patagonica E. A. Smith, 1881
- Lamellaria marginata Bergh, 1898: synonym of Lamellaria perspicua (Linnaeus, 1758)
- Lamellaria mauritiana Bergh, 1853: synonym of Coriocella nigra Blainville, 1824
- Lamellaria membranacea Montagu, 1815: synonym of Pleurobranchus membranaceus (Montagu, 1815)
- Lamellaria mollis E. A. Smith, 1902: synonym of Marseniopsis mollis (E. A. Smith, 1902)
- Lamellaria nigra (Blaiinville, 1824): synonym of Coriocella nigra Blainville, 1824
- Lamellaria obliqua Monterosato, 1878: synonym of Lamellaria perspicua (Linnaeus, 1758)
- Lamellaria pellucida Verrill, 1880 - translucent lamellaria: synonym of Calyptoconcha pellucida (A. E. Verrill, 1880)
- Lamellaria prodita Lovén, 1846: synonym of Marsenina glabra (Couthouy, 1838)
- Lamellaria rhombica Dall, 1871: synonym of Marsenina rhombica (Dall, 1871)
- Lamellaria rugosa Monterosato, 1878: synonym of Lamellaria perspicua (Linnaeus, 1758)
- Lamellaria sharonae Willett, 1939: synonym of Marseniopsis sharonae (Willett, 1939)
- Lamellaria spirolineata Monterosato, 1869: synonym of Lamellaria perspicua (Linnaeus, 1758)
- Lamellaria stearnsii (Dall, 1871): synonym of Marsenina stearnsii (Dall, 1871)
- Lamellaria tentaculata Montagu, 1815: synonym of Lamellaria latens (O. F. Müller, 1776)
- Lamellaria tenuis Monterosato, 1878: synonym of Lamellaria perspicua (Linnaeus, 1758)
- Lamellaria tongana (Quoy & Gaimard, 1832): synonym of Coriocella tongana (Quoy & Gaimard, 1832)
- Lamellaria uchidai Habe, 1958: synonym of Marsenina uchidai (Habe, 1958)
- Lamellaria wilsonae E. A. Smith, 1886: synonym of Mysticoncha wilsonae (E. A. Smith, 1886)

Taxon inquirendum

- Lamellaria hyadesi Mabille & Rochebrune, 1889

== Secondary metabolites ==
They are the source of Lamellarin D, found by Steiner et al. 2015 and Borjan et al. 2015 to a cytotoxin.
