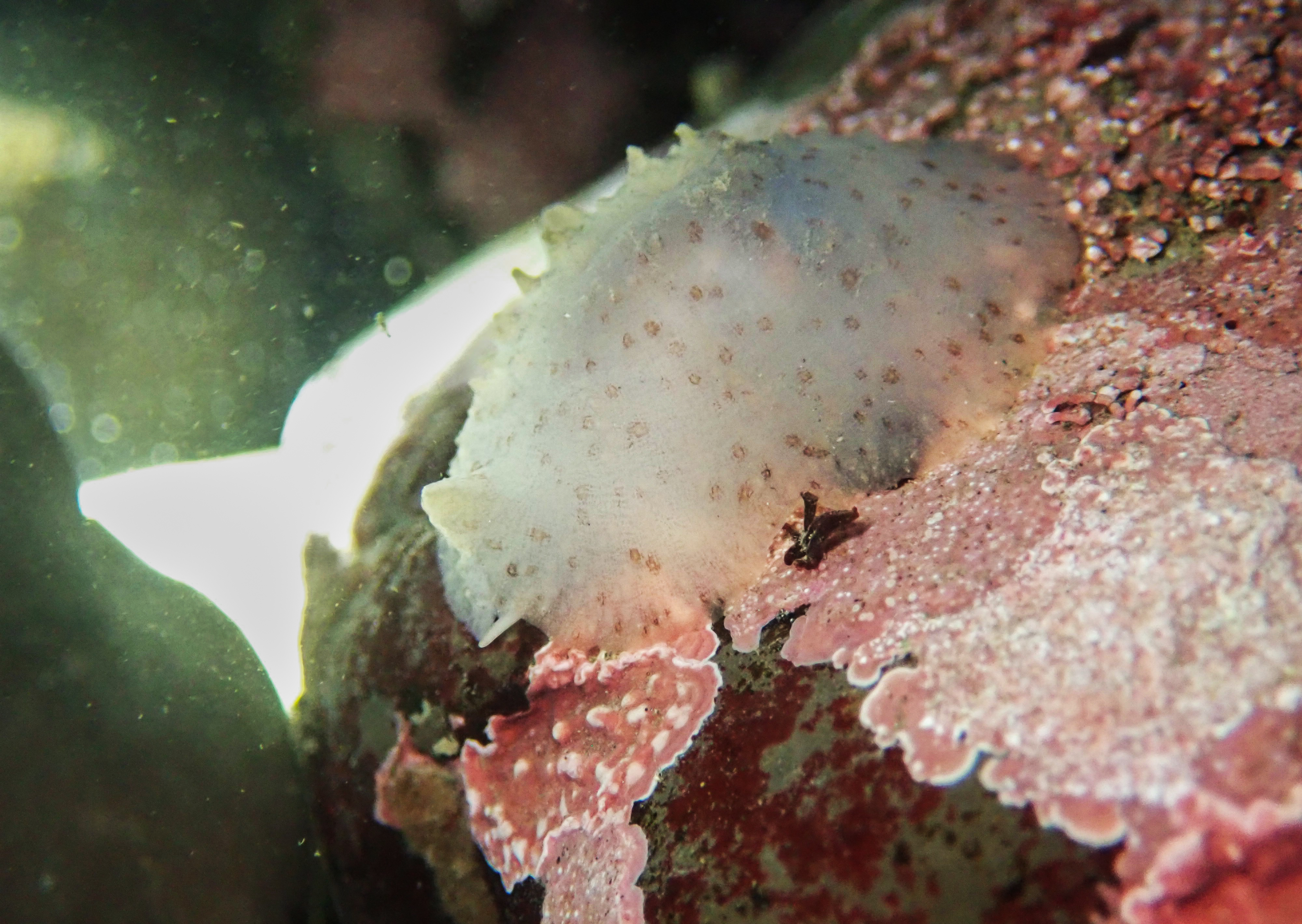

Scientific classification
- Kingdom: Animalia
- Phylum: Mollusca
- Class: Gastropoda
- Subclass: Caenogastropoda
- Order: Littorinimorpha
- Family: Velutinidae
- Genus: Marsenina
- Species: M. rhombica

Binomial name
- Marsenina rhombica Dall, 1871

= Marsenina rhombica =

Species of velutinid

Marsenina rhombica is a North Pacific species of velutinid, a group of marine molluscs that have fragile internal shells and are slug-like in appearance. They can be difficult to spot as they are totally camouflaged on their main prey species, Ascidia paratropa.

== Description ==
=== Description of adult ===
M. rhombica has a gelatinous, semi-transparent, cloudy off-white mantle with scattered tubercles or warts. Like other Marsenina species, it has a dorsal slit in the mantle. When this slit is open, it can allow the white internal shell to peek through, although unlike cowries, as a velutinid, it cannot fully retract the mantle. The mantle slit is usually closed entirely, and when the internal shell is not visible, M. rhombica can be mistaken for dorid nudibranches. Also like other velutinids, it has a pair of thin tentacles on its head with bulbous eyespots at the base of each. Penis shape is unique to each Marsenina species; M. rhombica has a curved penis shaped like a cow horn.

Two other pale, whitish-mantled Marsenina species overlap in range in the North Pacific including Monterey Bay: Marsenina stearnsi and Marsenina zadei. Both of these species differ from M. rhombica in having a smooth mantle that lacks tubercles. In the Bering Sea, Sea of Okhotsk, and Sea of Japan, it overlaps in range with Marsenina uchidai, which has spots at the edge of its mantle.

=== Description of shell ===
The shell can attain a size of 5.5 mm (height) x 13.4 mm (length) x 9.2 mm (width). Compared to other Marsenina species, the white to yellowish internal shell is elongated with an odd, almost rhombic shape. The shell has a low spire with two whorls and a broad, nearly square aperture. Marsenina species are sometimes referred to as ear shells; following this pattern, this species could be called the common name "rhombic ear shell".

== Range and habitat ==
This cold water marine mollusc is found in the Bering Sea including the Commander Islands, the Peter the Great Gulf in the Sea of Japan, the southern Kuril Islands, and the Northeastern Pacific, including British Columbia, Washington, Oregon, and California down to the type locality of Monterey Bay.

M. rhombica can be found from the intertidal zone to 103 m deep, often more deeply than other Marsenina species, usually in the subtidal zone from 35 to 60 m, in areas with mud, sand, stone, or pebble bottoms. In the Commander Islands, M. rhombica was found from 5 to 80 m, a greater average depth than its congener M. uchidai, which was located from the intertidal to 26 m deep.

== Diet ==
M. rhombica is a carnivore and is often found on the solitary tunicates that it preys on. Its warty, translucent whitish mantle camouflages perfectly with its frequent prey, Ascidia paratropa. It uses its radula to bore through the tunic of the tunicate and rasp out its soft insides. Unlike some other velutinids, it eats multiple species of prey and has been observed feeding on other solitary tunicates such as Pyura haustor, and on Chelyosoma productum and Boltenia villosa in captivity, even when fresh-caught Ascidia paratropa was offered.

== Reproduction and life stages ==
Like other Marsenina species, M. rhombica is a simultaneous hermaphrodite, which is rare in Caenogastropoda. In Washington, a study reported that reproduction takes place in the coldest time of the year, December - March.

M. rhombica embeds its egg capsules on Ascidia paratropa after it rasps a suitable depression into the tunic. Inside the egg capsules, the larvae slowly develop over the course of at least eight weeks before the capsule bursts open and releases free-swimming planktonic veligers. As in other velutinids, M. rhombica veligers have an unusual double-shelled form. The larva of this species begins the excretion of the visceral components of the true inner shell (the one retained in the adult form). It then secretes a hard, but not calcified, outer shell called the echinospira, which is round in this species. The echinospira is neutrally buoyant, and its large surface area likely aids the veliger in maintaining flotation in the water column. When threatened, the veliger retreats fully into its shell, making a water-tight seal by shutting the aperture with its operculum for 10–20 minutes.

After 72 days, the veligers metamorphose into the adult slug-like form, shedding the echinospira and beginning to reinforce and grow the true shell with calcium carbonate.

== Etymology ==
The species epithet rhombica was given by William Healey Dall, and it refers to the elongated internal shell that, uniquely to this species, is shaped similar to a rhombus. The genus Marsenina was erected in 1850 by John Edward Gray, who provided no explanation of the origin of this genus name in the description.

== Taxonomy ==
The closest relative of M. rhombica is a Chinese Yellow Sea species of Marsenina, described as Marsenina pax in 2021. Marsenina rhombica was previously called Lamellaria rhombica, but since reclassification to the genus Marsenina, this name is no longer accepted.
