= Piliscus commodus =

Scientific classification
- Kingdom: Animalia
- Phylum: Mollusca
- Class: Gastropoda
- Subclass: Caenogastropoda
- Order: Littorinimorpha
- Family: Velutinidae
- Genus: Piliscus
- Species: P. commodus

Binomial name
- Piliscus commodus (Middendorff, 1851)

Synonyms
- Capulacmaea radiata (M. Sars, 1851); Capulus depressus A. Adams, 1861; Capulus radiatus M. Sars, 1851 (junior synonym); Iothia radiata (M. Sars, 1851); Pilidium commodum Middendorff, 1851 (original combination); Pilidium radiatum (M. Sars, 1851); Piliscus probus Lovén, 1859; Piliscus radiatus (Sars M., 1851)

Species of gastropod

Piliscus commodus is a species of small sea snail with a transparent internal shell, a marine gastropod mollusk in the family Velutinidae. Because the shell is mostly internal, the snail resembles a sea slug in general appearance.

== Description ==
The maximum recorded (shell?) length is 28 mm.

== Habitat ==
The minimum recorded depth for this species is 40 m; maximum recorded depth is 325 m.
