= Onchidiopsis kingmaruensis =

Scientific classification
- Kingdom: Animalia
- Phylum: Mollusca
- Class: Gastropoda
- Subclass: Caenogastropoda
- Order: Littorinimorpha
- Family: Velutinidae
- Genus: Onchidiopsis
- Species: O. kingmaruensis

Binomial name
- Onchidiopsis kingmaruensis Russell, 1942

Species of gastropod

Onchidiopsis kingmaruensis is a species of small sea snail with a transparent internal shell, a marine gastropod mollusk in the family Velutinidae. Because the shell is mostly internal, the snail resembles a sea slug in general appearance.

== Description ==
The maximum recorded (shell?) length is 24 mm.

== Habitat ==
The minimum recorded depth for this species is 55 m; maximum recorded depth is 55 m.
