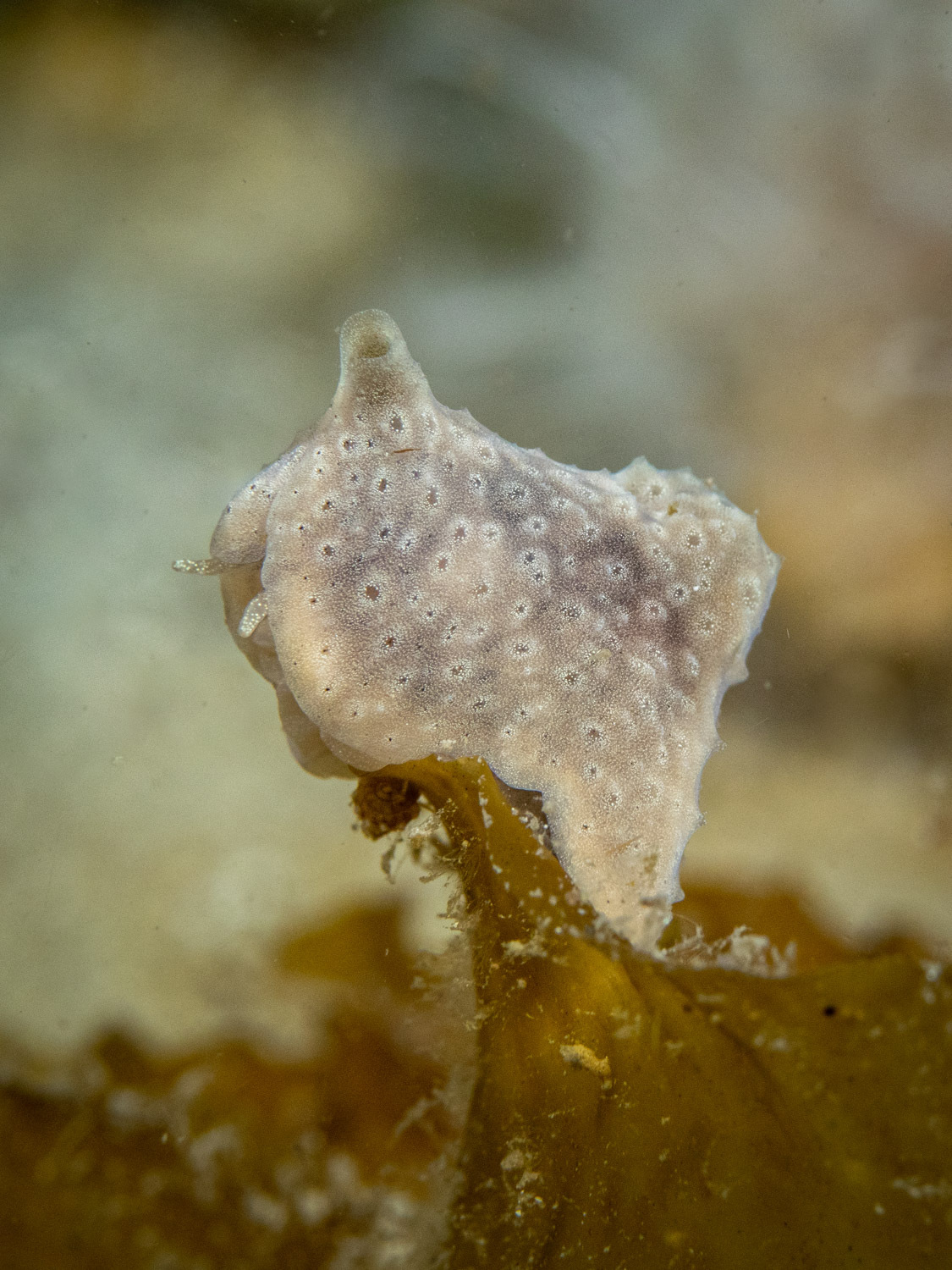
- Lamellaria ophione in Victoria, Australia

Scientific classification
- Kingdom: Animalia
- Phylum: Mollusca
- Class: Gastropoda
- Subclass: Caenogastropoda
- Order: Littorinimorpha
- Family: Velutinidae
- Genus: Lamellaria
- Species: L. ophione

Binomial name
- Lamellaria ophione Gray, 1850

= Lamellaria ophione =

Species of gastropod

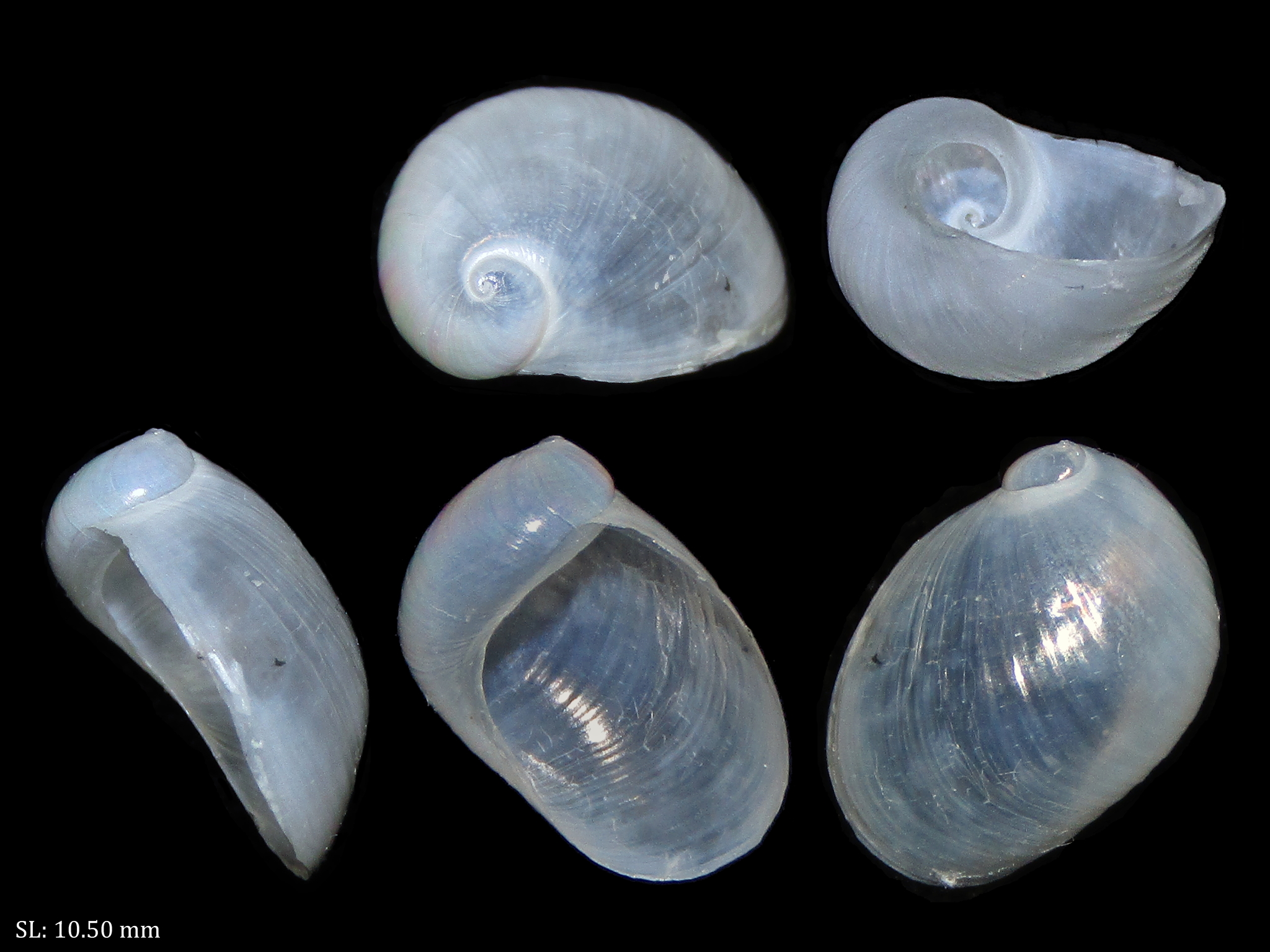
Shells of Lamellaria ophione

Lamellaria ophione is a species of small, sluglike sea snail, a marine gastropod mollusc in the family Velutinidae.
