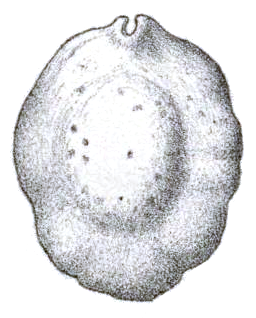
- Drawing of dorsal view of live animal

Scientific classification
- Kingdom: Animalia
- Phylum: Mollusca
- Class: Gastropoda
- Subclass: Caenogastropoda
- Order: Littorinimorpha
- Family: Velutinidae
- Genus: Lamellaria
- Species: L. latens

Binomial name
- Lamellaria latens (O. F. Müller, 1776)

Synonyms
- Bulla latens O. F. Müller, 1776; Lamellaria perspicua var. lata Jeffreys, 1867; Lamellaria tentaculata Montagu, 1816

= Lamellaria latens =

Species of gastropod

Lamellaria latens is a species of small, slug-like sea snail, a marine gastropod mollusc in the family Velutinidae. It is native to the northeastern Atlantic Ocean and the Mediterranean Sea where it feeds on colonial ascidians (sea squirts).

== Description ==
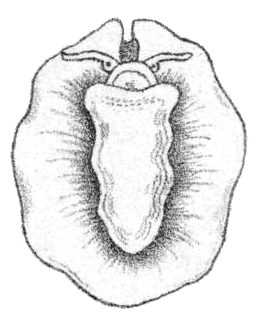
Drawing of ventral view of live animal

The shell is not visible externally because it is completely covered by the mantle. The shell is thin, smooth and fragile, and consists of two whorls with an unobtrusive spire and a somewhat depressed profile. The largest whorl is equivalent to the total height of the shell. The aperture is extremely wide. There is no operculum and the maximum dimensions of the shell are 9.5 by 5 mm (0.4 by 0.2 in). The part of the animal that is visible is the mantle, and this is smoother and less domed than the rather similar Lamellaria perspicua. It grows to about 10 mm (0.4 in) long by 6 mm (0.2 in) wide and is oval in shape, with a siphonal notch at the front. The colour varies but tends to be some shade of tan or brown, with darker flecks.

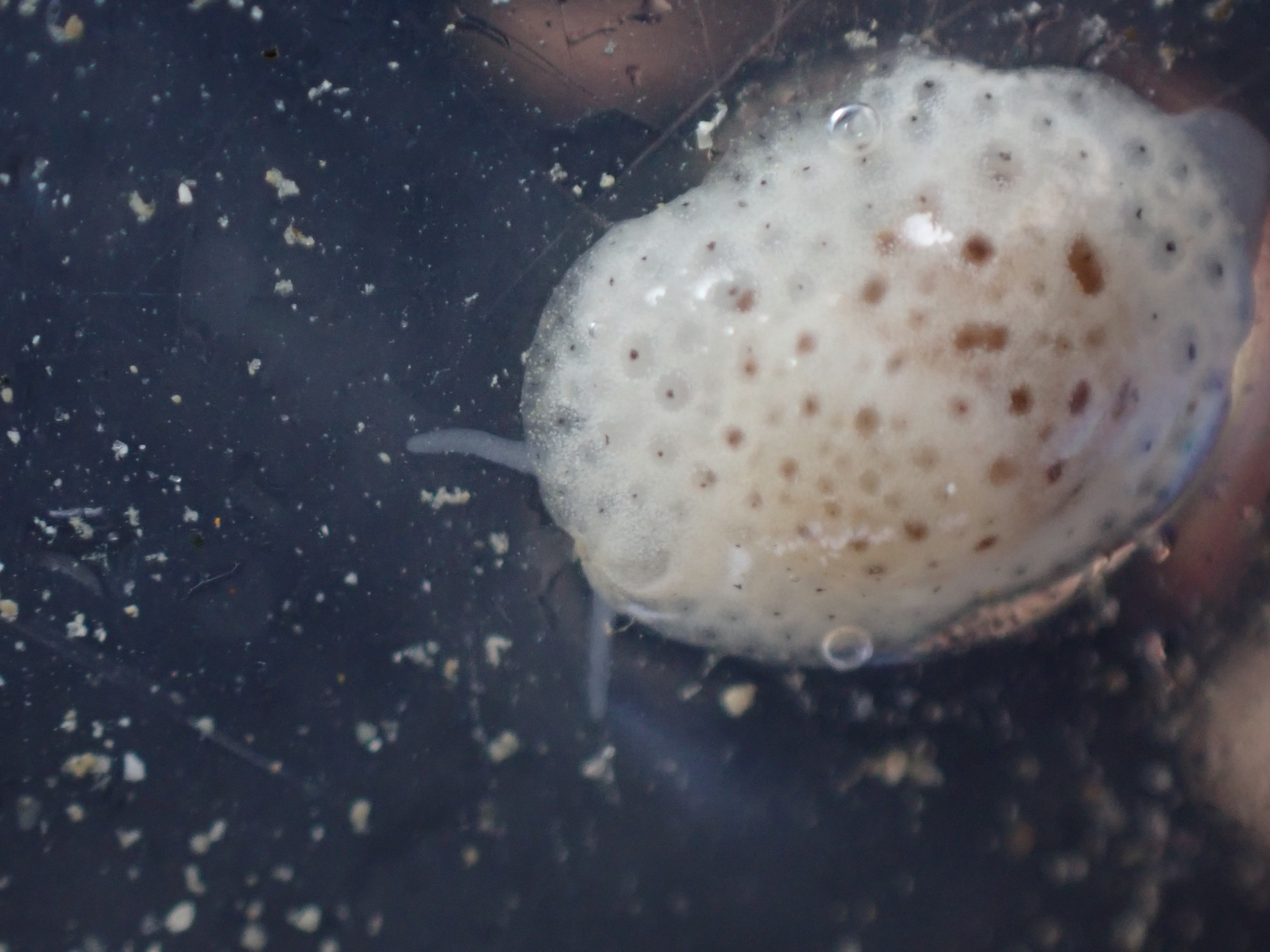
Lamellaria latens ex-situ.

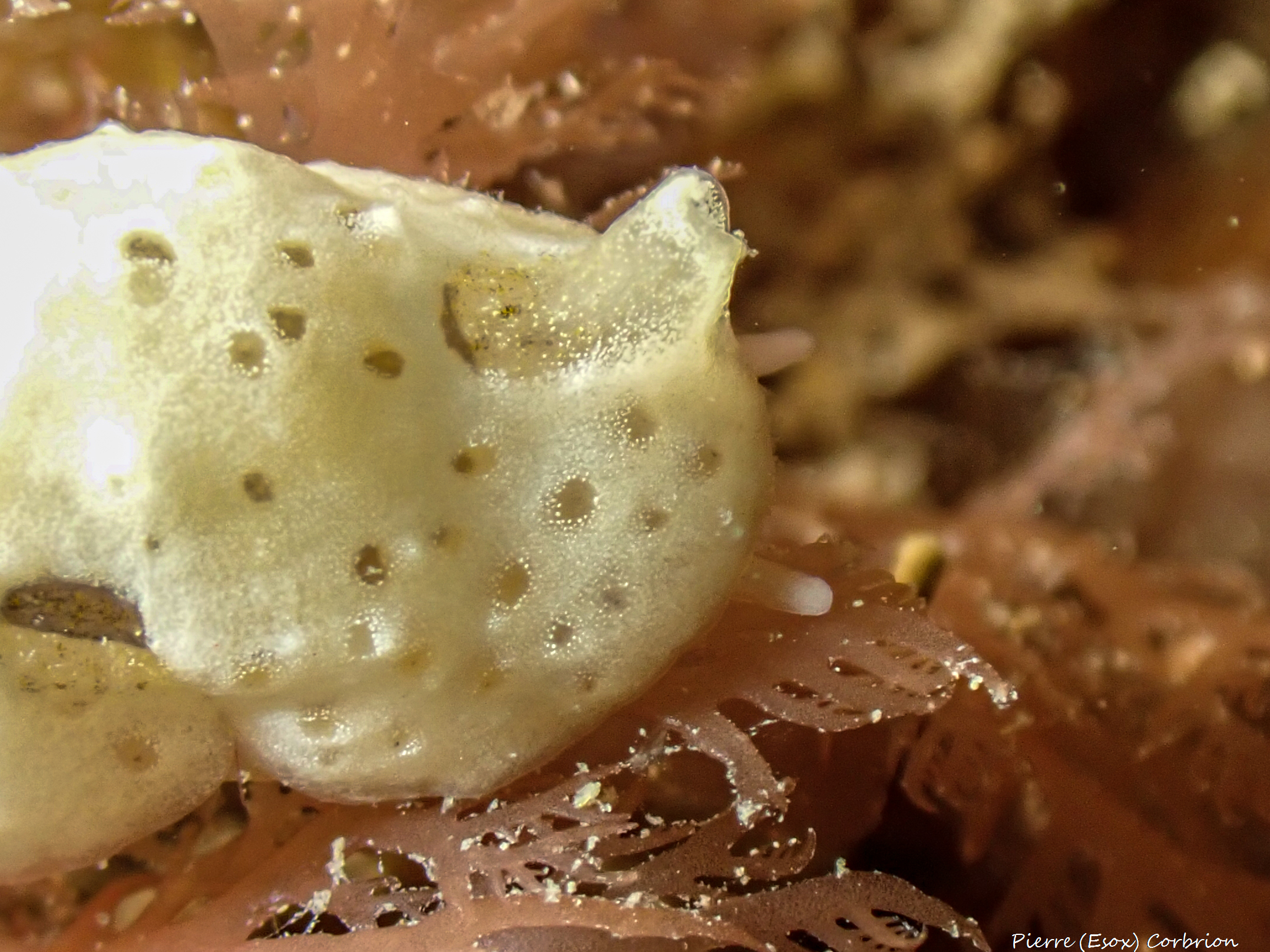
Lamellaria latens in-situ.

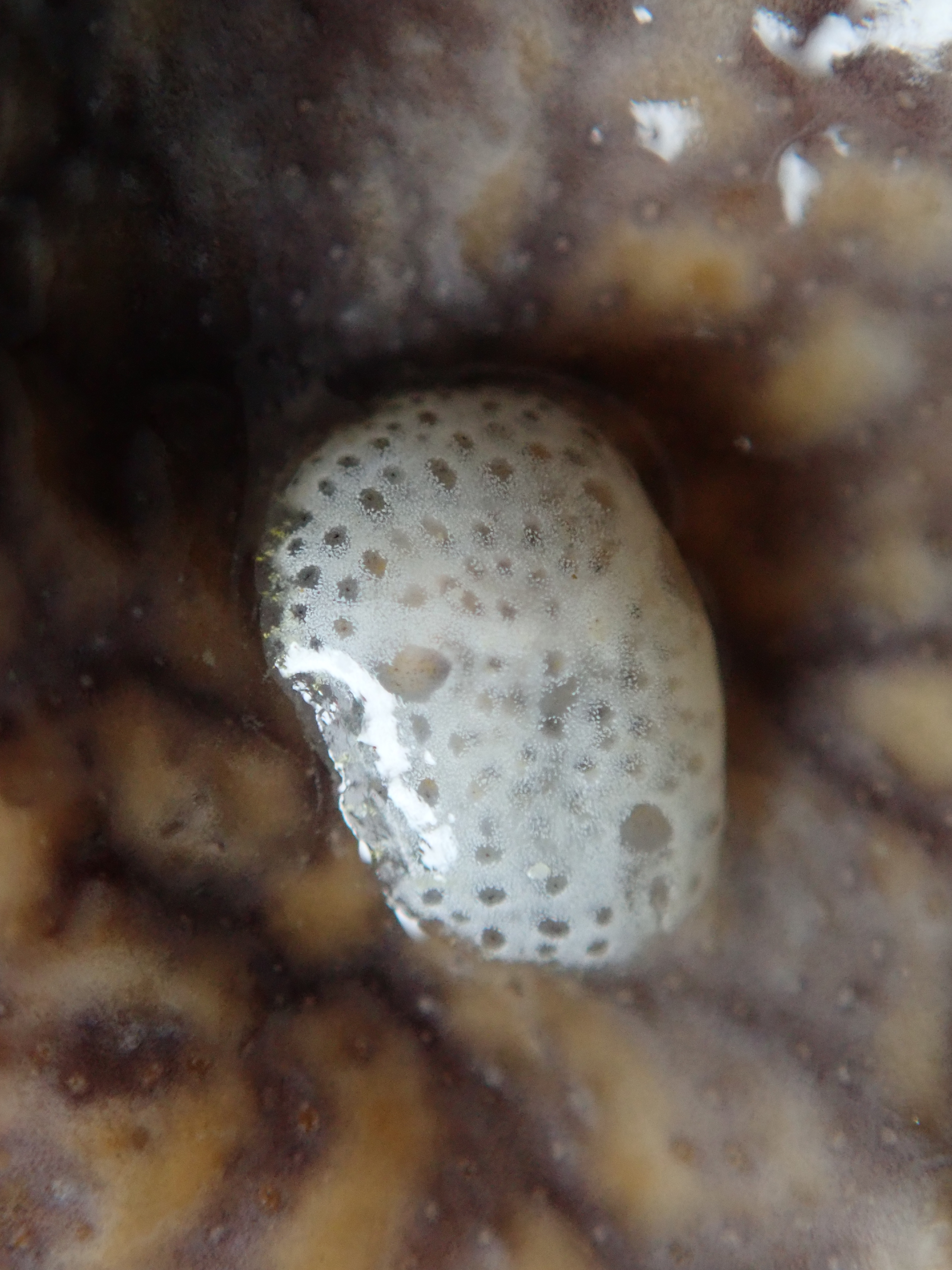
Lamellaria latens mimetism.

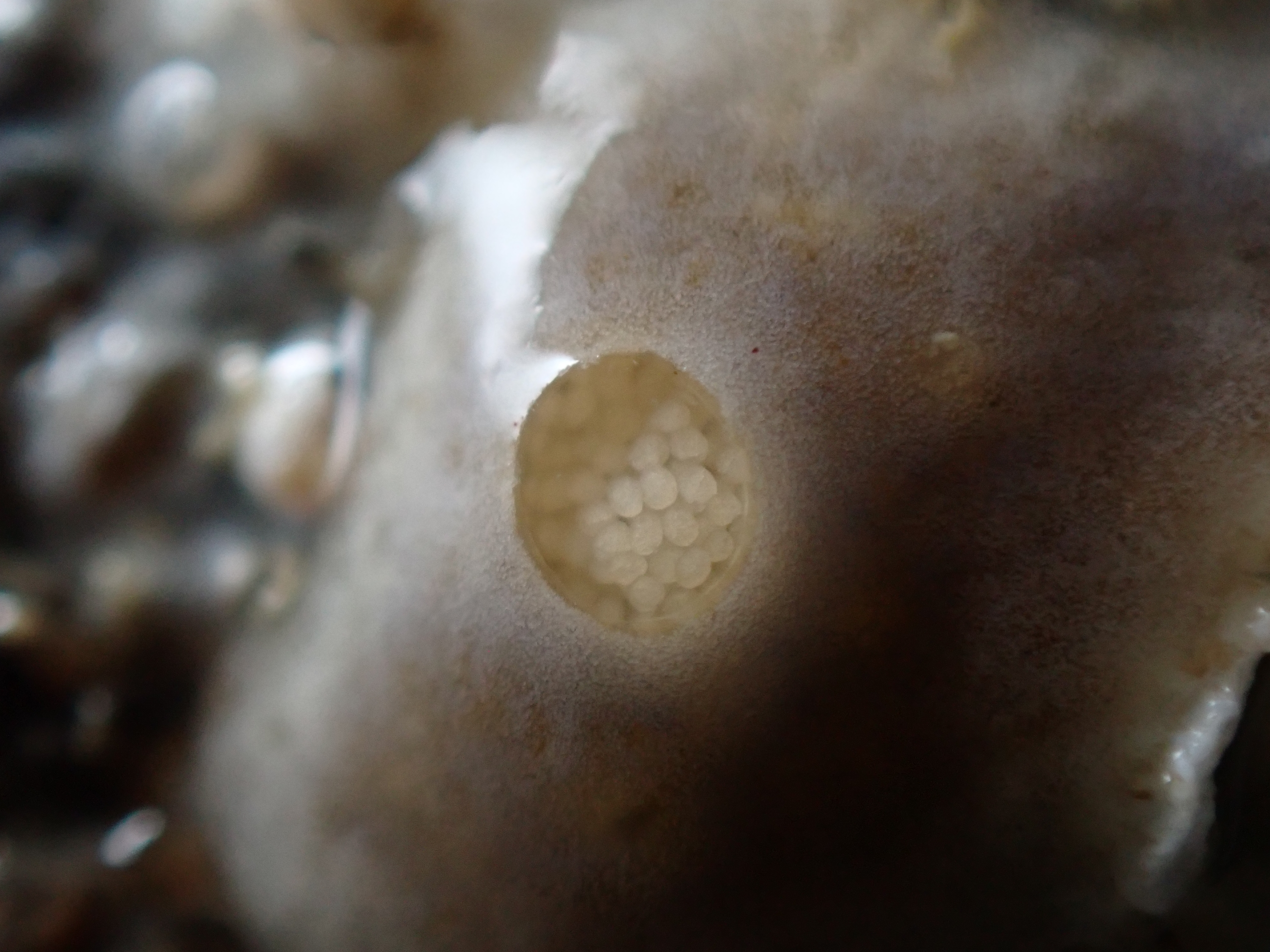

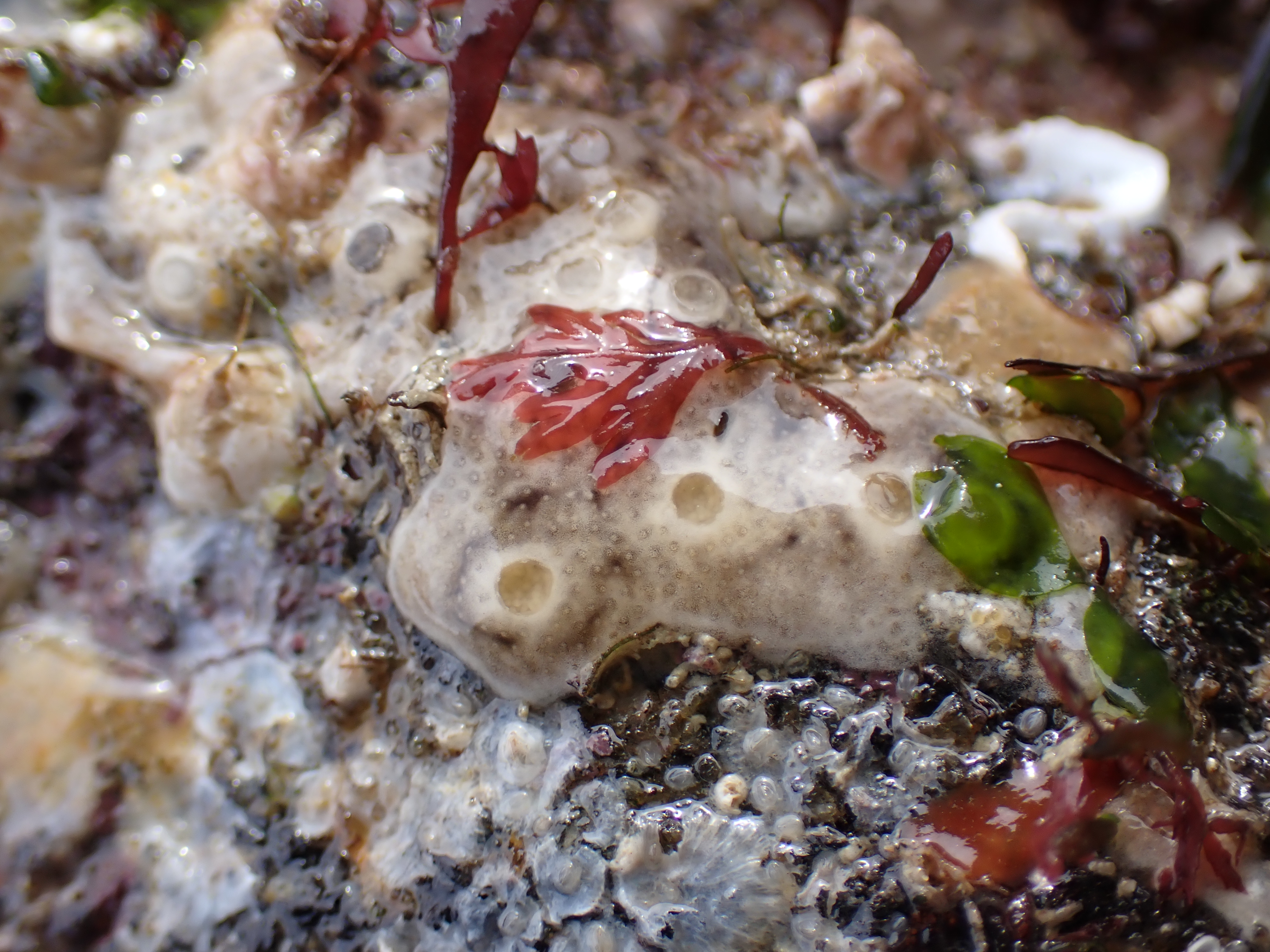
