= O. carnea =

O. carnea may refer to:

- Ochagavia carnea, a bromeliad endemic to Chile
- Onchidiopsis carnea, a sea snail
- Opodiphthera carnea, a moth endemic to Australia
- Orchis carnea, an orchid endemic to Cape Province
- Oreta carnea, a hook tip moth
- Orobanche carnea, a herbaceous plant
