= Pseudotorellia fragilis =

Scientific classification
- Kingdom: Animalia
- Phylum: Mollusca
- Class: Gastropoda
- Subclass: Caenogastropoda
- Order: Littorinimorpha
- Family: Velutinidae
- Genus: Pseudotorellia
- Species: P. fragilis

Binomial name
- Pseudotorellia fragilis Warén, 1989

Species of gastropod

Pseudotorellia fragilis is a species of small sea snail with a transparent, more or less internal shell, a marine gastropod mollusk in the family Velutinidae. Because the shell is mostly internal, the snail resembles a sea slug in general appearance.
