= Pilidium =

Pilidium may refer to:

- Pilidium (zoology), larva of nemertean worms
- Pilidium (fungus), a genus of funguses in the family Chaetomellaceae
- Pilidium, a genus of gastropods in the family Velutinidae, synonym of Piliscus
