= Mysticoncha harrisonae =

Scientific classification
- Kingdom: Animalia
- Phylum: Mollusca
- Class: Gastropoda
- Subclass: Caenogastropoda
- Order: Littorinimorpha
- Family: Velutinidae
- Genus: Mysticoncha
- Species: M. harrisonae

Binomial name
- Mysticoncha harrisonae Powell, 1946

Species of gastropod

Mysticoncha harrisonae is a species of small sea snail that resembles a sea slug, a marine gastropod mollusc in the family Velutinidae. This species is known only from the vicinity of South Island and Stewart Island in New Zealand.
