= Ciliatovelutina lanigera =

Scientific classification
- Kingdom: Animalia
- Phylum: Mollusca
- Class: Gastropoda
- Subclass: Caenogastropoda
- Order: Littorinimorpha
- Family: Velutinidae
- Genus: Ciliatovelutina
- Species: C. lanigera

Binomial name
- Ciliatovelutina lanigera (Møller, 1842)

Synonyms
- Velutina lanigera Møller, 1842 (basionym)

Species of gastropod

Ciliatovelutina lanigera is a species of small sea snail, a marine gastropod mollusk in the family Velutinidae.

== Description ==
They are benthos and are predators, feeding on sessile prey.

== Distribution ==
The distribution of Ciliatovelutina lanigera includes:

- European waters
- Northwest Atlantic, Canada: Baffin Island
