= Onchidiopsis corys =

Scientific classification
- Kingdom: Animalia
- Phylum: Mollusca
- Class: Gastropoda
- Subclass: Caenogastropoda
- Order: Littorinimorpha
- Family: Velutinidae
- Genus: Onchidiopsis
- Species: O. corys

Binomial name
- Onchidiopsis corys Balch, 1910

Species of gastropod

Onchidiopsis corys is a species of small sea snail with a transparent internal shell, a marine gastropod mollusk in the family Velutinidae. Because the shell is mostly internal, the snail resembles a sea slug in general appearance.

== Distribution ==
This marine species can be found along the coast of Newfoundland and Labrador, Canada.

== Description ==
The broadly ovoid snail has a maximum recorded length of 20 mm. It is cream-colored with about eight brown spots. The thin dorsal surface (notaeum) is smooth on top and on the sides, but wrinkled and vesiculate elsewhere. It envelops the transparent, thin, white internal shell. The shell shows some faint concentric lines of growth. This shell covers the top and the sides of a large visceral hump, suggesting in its form a Homeric helmet (Greek : korys), hence the name of the epithet corys. This hump is a smooth dome of purplish-yellow visceral mass, mainly consisting of the glands of the genital system.

The osphradium is black at its base and has a peculiar form. The gill leaflets are not auriculate.

The foot shows a large proboscis with a truncated-cone shape. On the foot are also two tentacles, about the same length of the proboscis, with conspicuous black eye spots. The large penis is situated on the right side of the neck above the right tentacle.

The taenioglossan radula has the usual formula with seven teeth in a row : 2 + 1 + 1 + 1 + 2. The central tooth is arched and is at its base about as wide as high. Its top forms a dentate, cusplike blade. The lateral teeth are higher and somewhat narrower at their base. The marginal teeth are formed like arched claws, curving upward, backward and slightly outward. The inner uncinal hooks are nondenticulate.

All these characteristics sharply differentiate Onchidiopsis corys from the other species in this genus.

== Habitat ==
The minimum recorded depth for this species is 137 m.
