= Coriocella safagae =

Scientific classification
- Kingdom: Animalia
- Phylum: Mollusca
- Class: Gastropoda
- Subclass: Caenogastropoda
- Order: Littorinimorpha
- Family: Velutinidae
- Genus: Coriocella
- Species: C. safagae

Binomial name
- Coriocella safagae Wellens, 1999

Species of gastropod

Coriocella safagae is a species of small sea snail with a transparent internal shell, a marine gastropod mollusk in the family Velutinidae. Because the shell is mostly internal, the snail resembles a sea slug in general appearance.
