= Mysticoncha =

Scientific classification
- Kingdom: Animalia
- Phylum: Mollusca
- Class: Gastropoda
- Subclass: Caenogastropoda
- Order: Littorinimorpha
- Superfamily: Velutinoidea
- Family: Velutinidae
- Subfamily: Lamellariinae
- Genus: Mysticoncha; Allan, 1936

Type species
- Lamellaria wilsonae E. A. Smith, 1886

Genus of gastropods

Mysticoncha is a genus of small sea snails that resemble sea slugs, marine gastropod molluscs in the family Velutinidae.

== Species ==
Species within the genus Mysticoncha include:

- Mysticoncha harrisonae Powell, 1946
- Mysticoncha wilsonae (E. A. Smith, 1886)
