= Lamellaria cerebroides =

Scientific classification
- Kingdom: Animalia
- Phylum: Mollusca
- Class: Gastropoda
- Subclass: Caenogastropoda
- Order: Littorinimorpha
- Family: Velutinidae
- Genus: Lamellaria
- Species: L. cerebroides

Binomial name
- Lamellaria cerebroides Hutton, 1883

Synonyms
- Lamelloria cerebroides (sic) Hutton, 1882; Mysticoncha cerebroides (Hutton, 1883)

Species of gastropod

Lamellaria cerebroides is a species of small, slug-like sea snail, a marine gastropod mollusc in the family Velutinidae.
