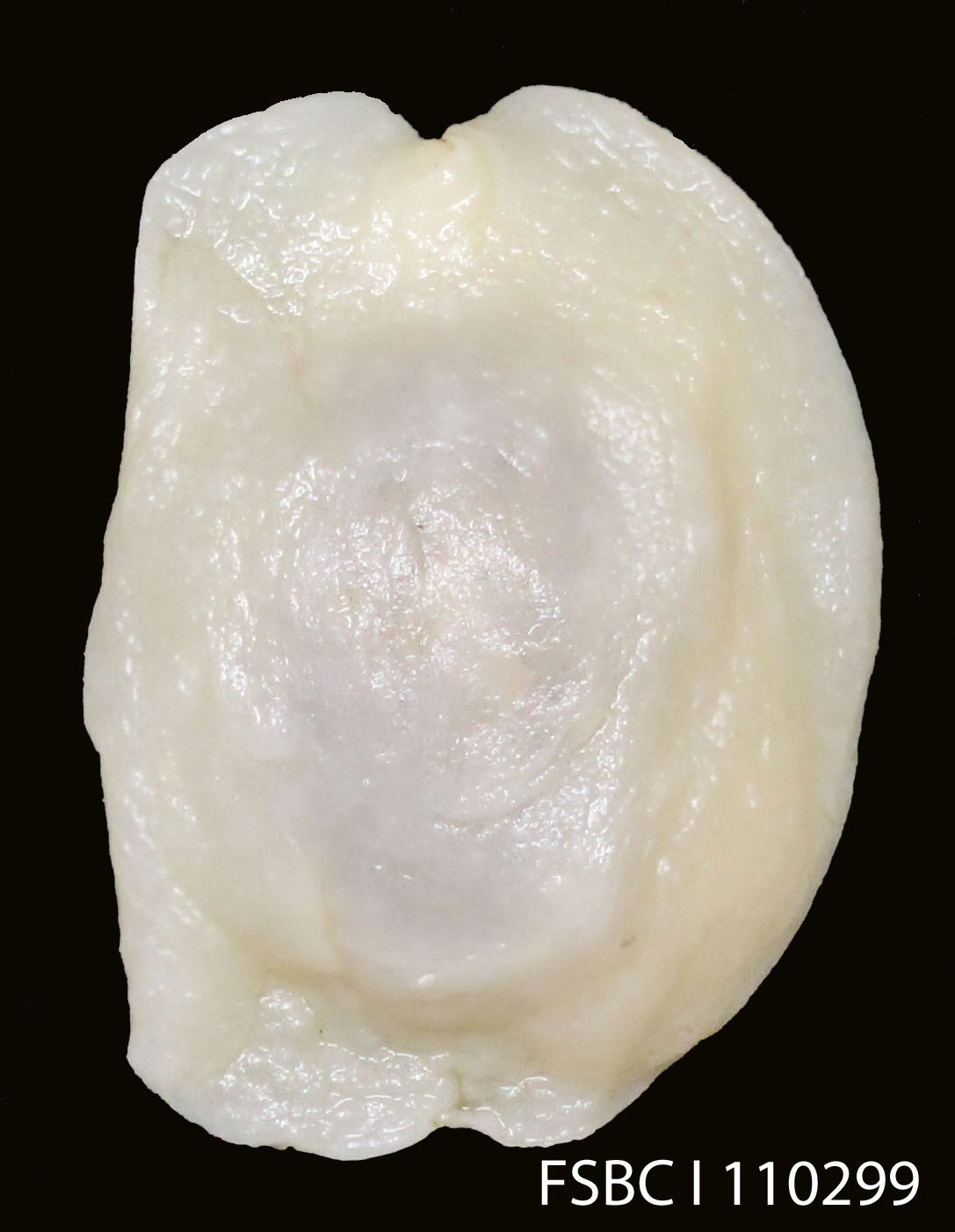
- Upper side of L. perspicua

Scientific classification
- Kingdom: Animalia
- Phylum: Mollusca
- Class: Gastropoda
- Subclass: Caenogastropoda
- Order: Littorinimorpha
- Family: Velutinidae
- Genus: Lamellaria
- Species: L. perspicua

Binomial name
- Lamellaria perspicua (Linnaeus, 1758)

Synonyms
- Bulla haliotoidea Montagu, 1803; Helix neritoidea Gmelin, 1791; Helix perspicua Linnaeus, 1758; Lamellaria cochinella Perry L., 1939; Sigaretus kindelaninus Michaud, 1828

= Lamellaria perspicua =

Species of gastropod

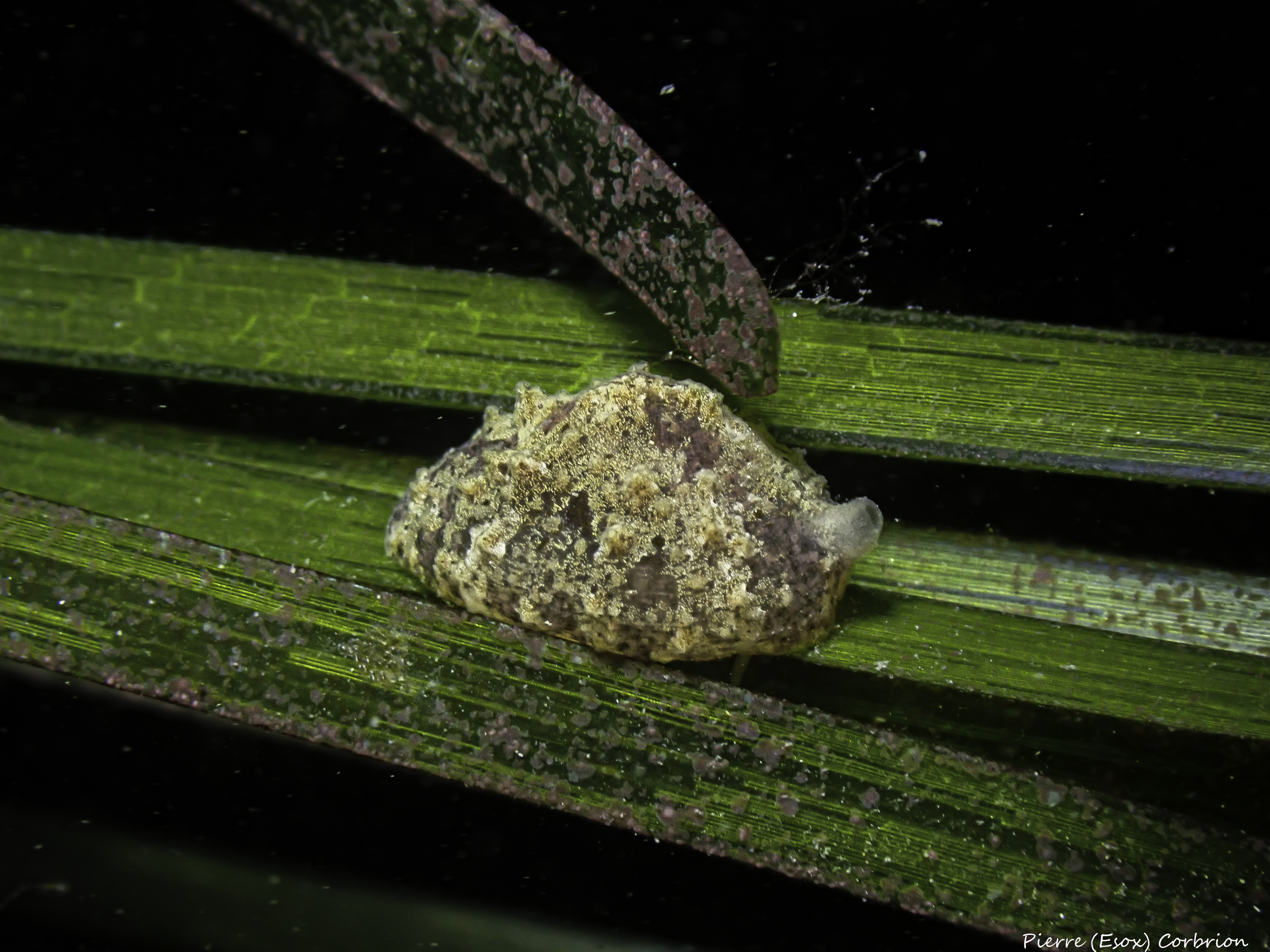
Lamellaria perspicua

Lamellaria perspicua, commonly known as the transparent lamellaria, is a species of small, slug-like sea snail, a marine gastropod mollusc in the family Velutinidae. It is native to the northeastern Atlantic Ocean and the Mediterranean Sea, where it feeds on colonial ascidians (sea squirts).

== Description ==
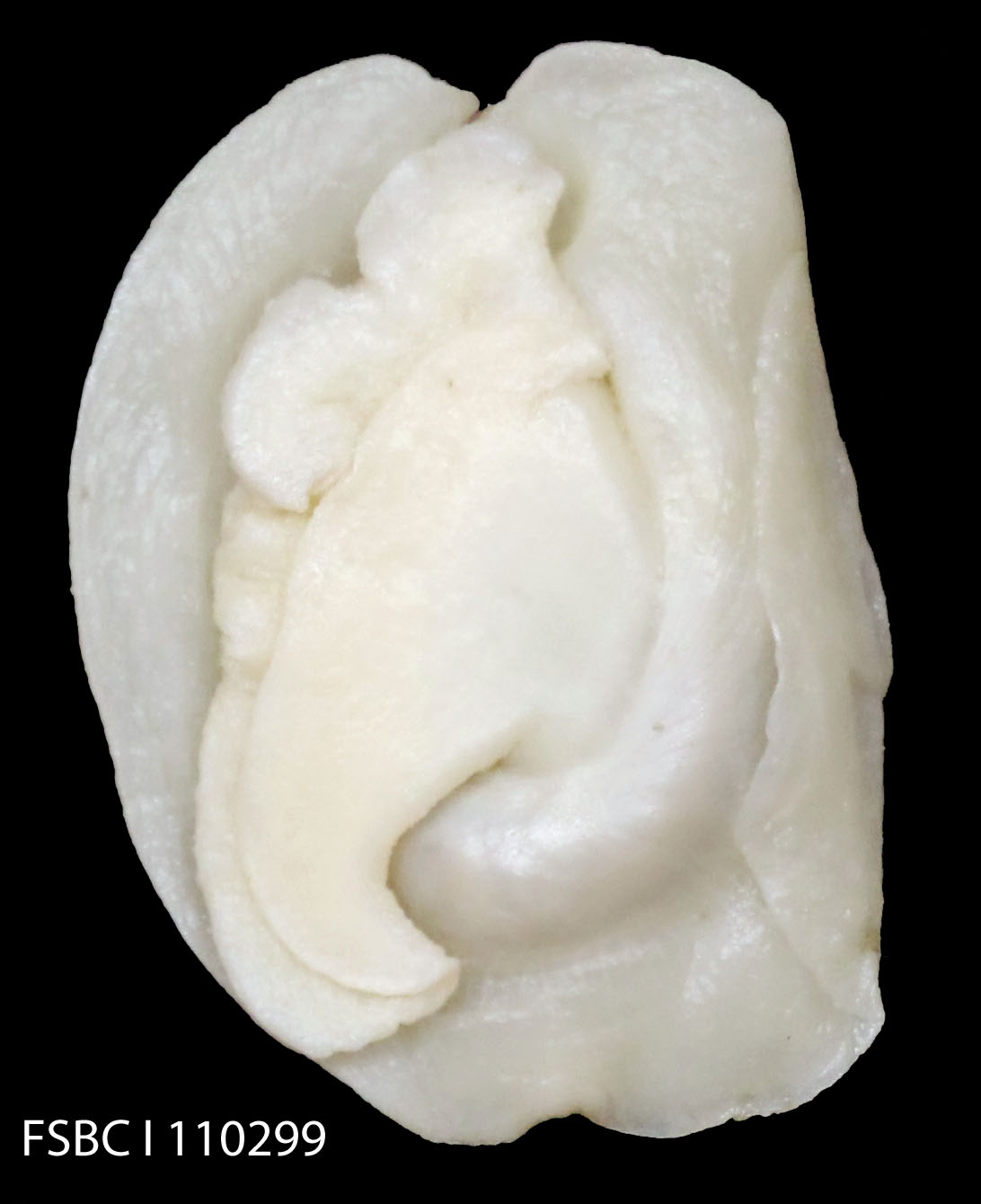
Underside of L. perspicua

The shell is not visible externally because it is completely surrounded by the mantle. The shell is thin, smooth and fragile, and consists of two to three whorls with a short spire. The last whorl is 95% of the total height of the shell. The aperture is very wide and somewhat spoon-shaped, being extended slightly to the right. There is no operculum and the shell is up to 10 mm (0.4 in) long.

The animal grows to about 20 mm (0.8 in) long by 12 mm (0.5 in) wide and is oval in shape, with a siphonal notch at the front. The dorsal surface of the mantle bears tubercular projections, the margins are thickened and there is a siphon-like extension at the front. The colour is variable, varying from grey to lilac, yellowish, buff or orange, sometimes with black flecks.

== Distribution and habitat ==
Lamellaria perspicua is native to the northeastern Atlantic Ocean. Its range extends from Iceland and Norway southwards to the Mediterranean Sea and includes the North Sea and the English Channel. Its depth range is from low water at spring tides down to about 1,200 m (4,000 ft). It conceals itself under rocks and can be found in areas where compound ascidians grow.

== Ecology ==
This snail both feeds on ascidians and lays its eggs on them. The colour and texture of the mollusc often closely resemble the surface of the compound ascidian on which it is living, which fact renders the mollusc well-camouflaged. Some individuals have red patches which resemble small colonies of sponge, and others have been observed with the tubercles coloured in such a way as to resemble acorn barnacles. These colourings make it difficult for potential predators to detect the molluscs, and another defensive mechanism is acid-secreting glands in the dorsal epidermis that make the molluscs distasteful to fish.

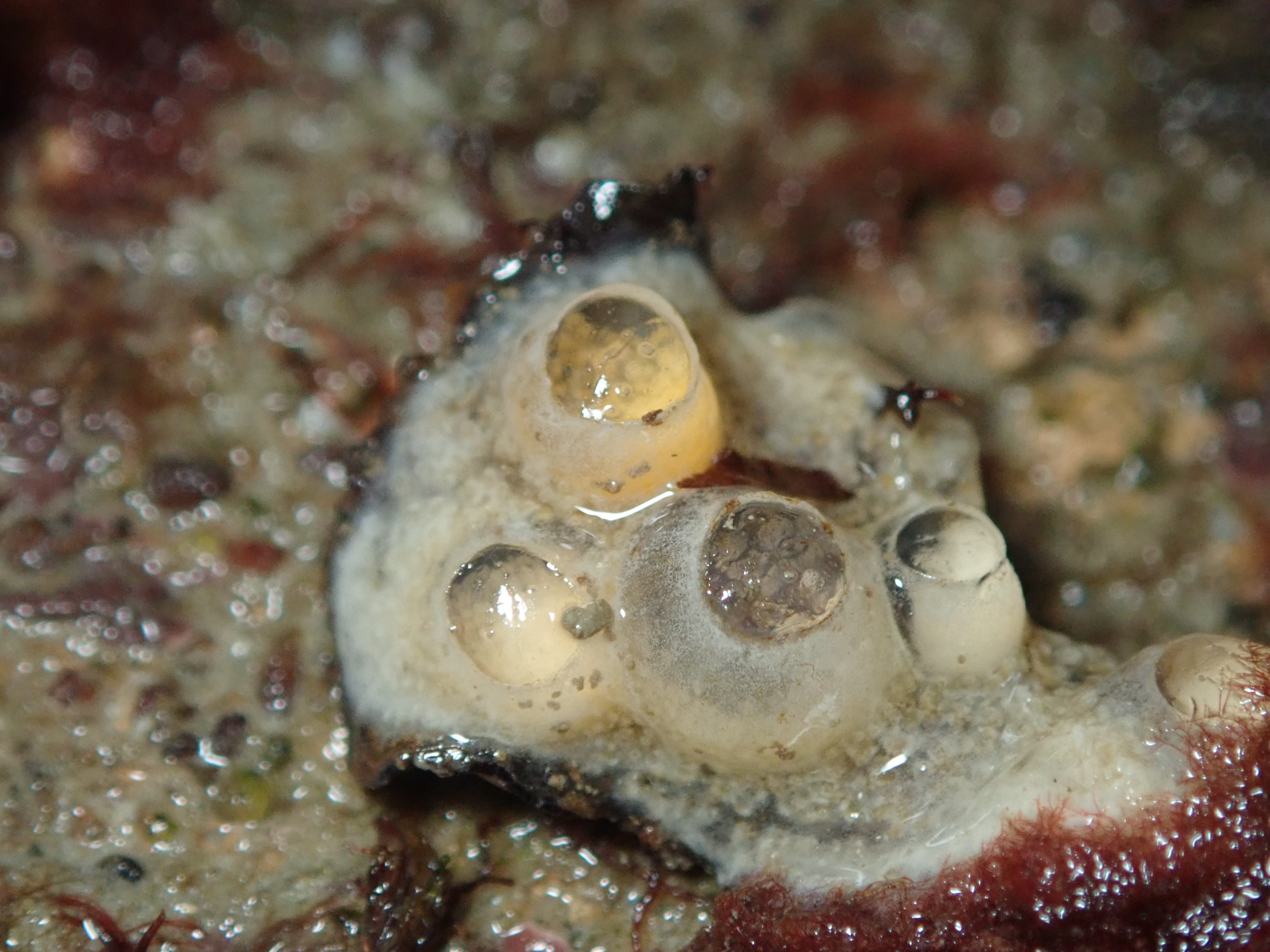
Eggs of Lamellaria perspicua.

Breeding takes place in spring and summer in this species. The sexes are separate and fertilisation is internal. The female deposits batches of up to 3000 eggs in capsules deposited in holes she has gnawed in the ascidian colony. The larvae hatch after about three weeks and are pelagic, probably drifting with the plankton for quite a long time.
