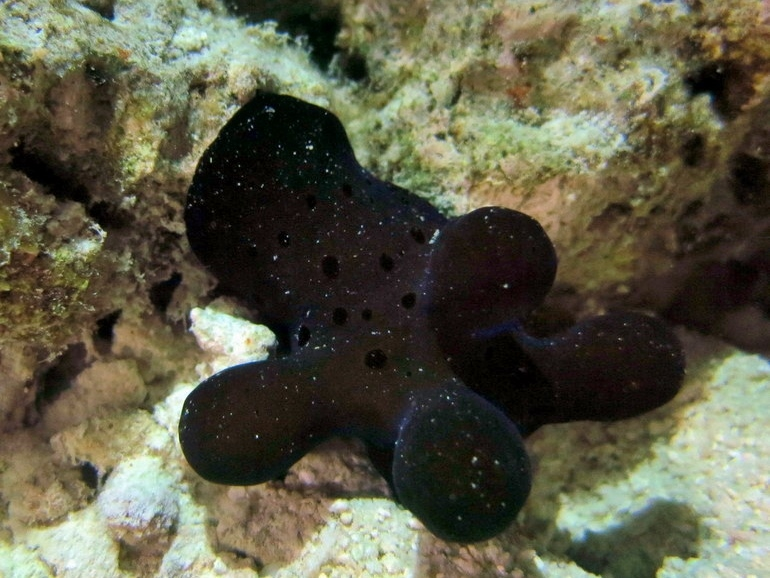
- Coriocella hibyae in Landaa Giraavaru (Maldives, Baa Atoll).

Scientific classification
- Kingdom: Animalia
- Phylum: Mollusca
- Class: Gastropoda
- Subclass: Caenogastropoda
- Order: Littorinimorpha
- Family: Velutinidae
- Genus: Coriocella
- Species: C. hibyae

Binomial name
- Coriocella hibyae Wellens, 1991

= Coriocella hibyae =

Species of gastropod

Coriocella hibyae, common name the Hiby's coriocella or the velvet snail, is a species of sea snail, a marine gastropod mollusc in the family Velutinidae.

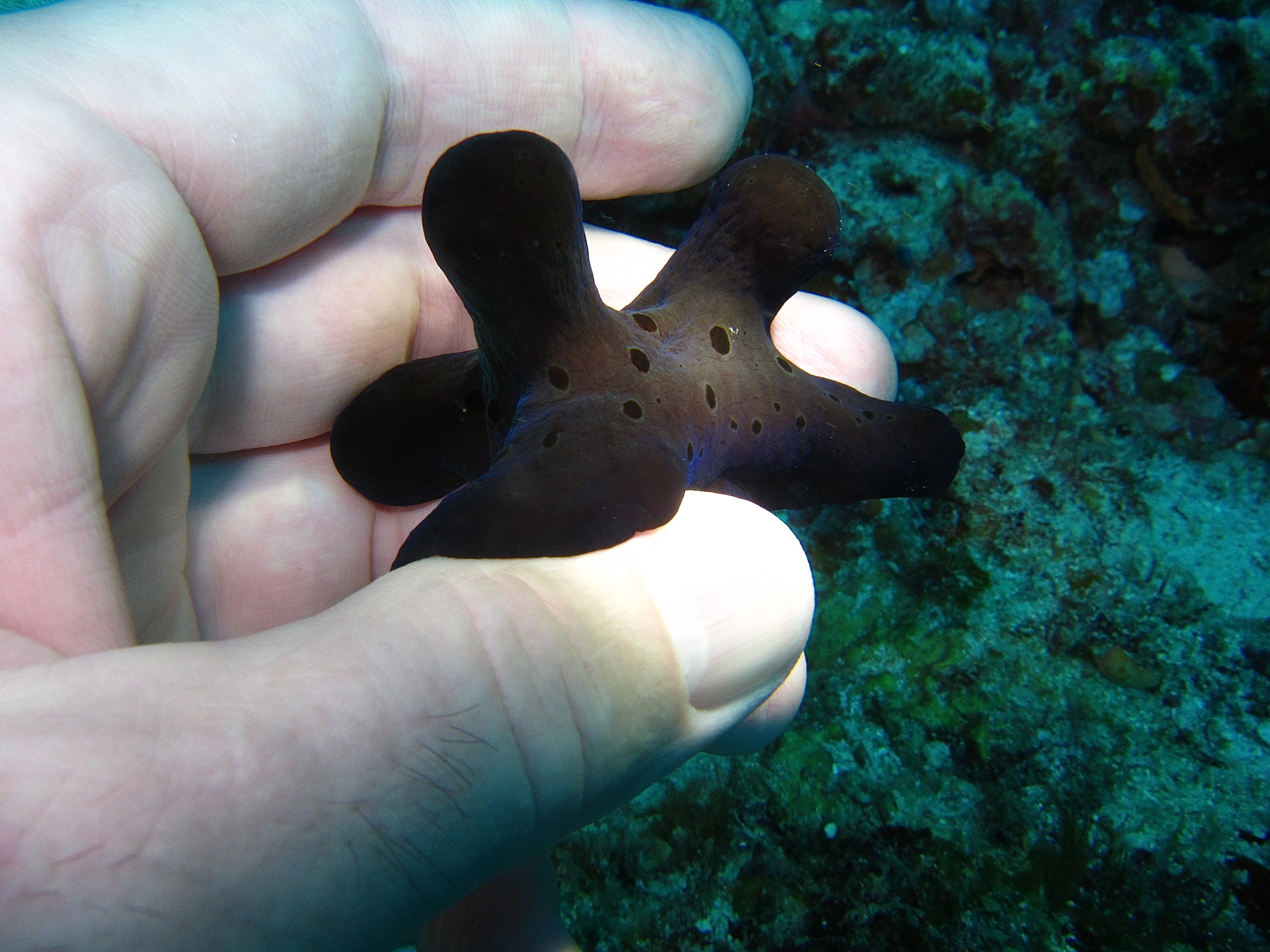

== Description ==
Although it has a shell, the shell is hidden within folds of the mantle, and overall the creature looks more like a sea slug than a snail, but in situ its external appearance resembles that of a sponge, which makes it difficult to spot underwater.

Hiby's coriocella is known from the Maldives, in the Indian Ocean. Its distribution range may in fact be greater than this, but as yet little is known about this species.

This species can reach a maximum size of 10 cm in length. It more closely resembles a sea slug than a sea snail, and there are five digit-like protrusions on its dorsal side. The body coloration varies from slate-blue to dark brown, with some small round black spots which is part of what makes it look like a sponge. A fragile ear-shaped shell is hidden inside the fleshy mantle.
