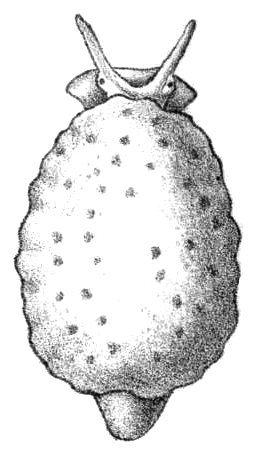
- Drawing of a live specimen of Onchidiopsis glacialis

Scientific classification
- Kingdom: Animalia
- Phylum: Mollusca
- Class: Gastropoda
- Subclass: Caenogastropoda
- Order: Littorinimorpha
- Family: Velutinidae
- Subfamily: Lamellariinae
- Genus: Onchidiopsis; Bergh, 1853

Type species
- Onchidiopsis groenlandica Bergh, 1853

Synonyms
- Onchidiopsis (Atlantolimax) Dall, 1916 alternative representation; Onchidiopsis (Bulloonchidiopsis) A. N. Golikov & Gulbin, 1990 alternative representation; Onchidiopsis (Onchidiopsis) Bergh, 1853 alternative representation; Onchidiopsis (Rostroonchidiopsis) A. N. Golikov & Gulbin, 1990 alternative representation; Oncidiopsis [sic] (incorrect subsequent spelling [by Paetel, 1875] of Onchidiopsis Bergh, 1853)

= Onchidiopsis =

Genus of gastropods

Onchidiopsis is a genus of small slug-like sea snails, marine gastropod molluscs in the subfamily Lamellariinae within the family Velutinidae.

== Characteristics ==
The skin on the dorsal side of Onchidiopsis is relatively significantly thicker than that of Marsenia and much softer. Externally, in Onchidiopsis grönlandica, the skin is raised into a great many unequal, irregular, rounded, and blister-like, merging into one another; in Onchidiopsis carnea, the surface is more even, though it becomes much softer toward the margin, where it is irregular and appears as if inflated like a bladder. From the outside, not even the slightest trace of an enclosed shell can be detected, either by sight or by touch. The mantle did not project over the foot with a true brim, though it extended considerably beyond it, albeit with a more rounded margin; on the underside of the mantle margin, a striation of the kind found in Marsenia (subg.) could not be discovered. If the skin was slit, its interior appeared perfectly smooth throughout, marked only by fine, arcuate lines and—particularly toward the front in O. grönlandica—somewhat pigmented with black. Under the microscope, the skin exhibited the same structure as in the Marsenia species, though the fibrous elements overall seemed to be present in greater abundance than in that genus.

The shell: Located within the skin is a shell that is entirely horny (conchiolin) in nature; for its morphological proportions, we otherwise refer to the description provided in the next section. The shell covers only about half of the animal's visceral mass; the remainder projects freely at the rear, covered here only by the development of the mantle. This mantle fits as closely to this naked portion as it does to the shell but was otherwise nowhere attached to the everywhere-smooth peritoneal surface of the visceral mass. The peritoneal membrane appeared as a structureless membrane, seemingly shot through in all directions by crossed, branched, clear fibers; these, however, were solely—or at least for the most part—extremely close-set and numerous folds in the membrane. On the interior of the shell, muscle impressions are hardly discernible; nowhere was the slightest trace of lime deposition visible on or within the shell. Under the microscope, it appeared to be structureless with distinct growth striae which, by being crowded together in the usual manner, had produced the growth lines visible to the naked eye.

The shell here, therefore, essentially plays only a role in protecting the respiratory cavity. Within the family treated here, Onchidiopsis thus represents the minimum development of the shell and becomes, within this group, the corresponding link to Limax, Testacella, and Parmacella—or Aplysia within other groups of gastropods.

The thin mantle: After the shell has been removed, the thin mantle that was covered by it appears as a yellowish surface. It is more transparent toward the front, thereby revealing the underlying branchial (gill) cavity; here, one can see the translucent gills attached to the upper wall of the branchial cavity: a smaller, anterior bipectinate gill, and a larger, posterior one with unilateral gill lamellae. In O. carnea, the small anterior gill appears as an almost black, small elliptical surface, as the gill lamellae are attached to such a base. Further toward the rear, the thin mantle is fused to the surface of the reproductive gland and a portion of the liver; toward the left side, the translucent heart is also visible. This entire surface of skin is bounded by a narrow but very distinct, relatively firm and tough thin-mantle margin, whose underside toward the front and sides is free toward the front, whereas toward the rear it is closely adhered to the underlying parts. Further forward on each side, the margin was more firmly attached at a single point to the overlying skin. Additionally, an oblong muscle spot is visible on each side within this same margin toward the front, though it was not possible to clearly trace any muscle strands from these spots down toward the foot.

Behind this margin, and thus projecting freely behind the shell, lies the more than hemispherical brownish liver (and reproductive gland) with its thin, smooth peritoneal covering.

Branchial cavity and gills: If the thin mantle is now cut from the front along its right margin and folded back toward the left, the floor and ceiling—or the lower and upper walls—of the branchial cavity lie exposed before us. Due to the presence of the shell, the branchial cavity is very slightly arched, especially toward the rear. It is somewhat deeper to the left near the heart; toward the rear and further to the right, it extends under the liver, though it remains very shallow there. The branchial slit is quite narrow (in O. grönlandica it is only 6 mm wide) and not very high. It continues forward and toward the left into a semi-canal, which is short and superficial in O. grönlandica, but deeper and longer in O. carnea.

The gill lamellae are attached along the entire length of one of their margins. In the smaller gill, the lamellae are quite thick but lower; in the larger gill, they are thin, triangular, and closely set (being relatively shorter and higher in O. grönlandica, while lower and more elongated in O. carnea). Under the microscope, a vessel was observed toward each margin, anastomosing with the one opposite (however, I have not been able to see distinct, separate walls in these blood-bearing passages).

Behind and to the right of the larger gill, the ceiling of the branchial cavity appeared to be weakly developed as a glandular area. In the same location, a small amount of what looked like solidified secretion was found, though even less distinctly than in the Marsenia species. Below and to the right of what I must here also assume to be the usual mucus-secreting organs (feuillets muqueux, Cuvier), the anus is visible immediately within the right corner of the branchial slit. It projects as a papilla-like prominence pierced at the tip by a round opening; a fine probe could be inserted through this opening for a short distance in a straight direction.

Beneath this was found a small, narrow transverse slit bounded by a pair of fairly distinct lips; through this, a probe could be guided a very short distance almost straight inward, though with a slight inclination to the right. Here, the scissors opened a small cavity lying entirely to the right, almost immediately beneath the thick mantle margin, bordering the liver at the rear. The lower wall of this cavity was smooth, whereas the upper wall presented short, leaf-like folds. Toward the right, it extended into a short, presumably blind sac; the rectum ran along its inner margin. This organ must likely be interpreted as the kidney.

== Species ==
Species within the genus Onchidiopsis include:

- Onchidiopsis brevipes Derjugin, 1937
- Onchidiopsis carnea Bergh, 1853
- Onchidiopsis clarki Behrens, Ornelas & Á. Valdés, 2014
- Onchidiopsis corys Bergh, 1910
- Onchidiopsis glacialis (Sars, 1851)
- Onchidiopsis groenlandica Bergh, 1853
- Onchidiopsis kingmaruensis Russell, 1942
- Onchidiopsis longipes Derjugin, 1937
- Onchidiopsis maculata Derjugin, 1937
- Onchidiopsis nadinae Derjugin, 1937
- Onchidiopsis nihonkaiensis Okutani & Numanami, 1993
- Onchidiopsis spitzbergensis Jensen in Thorson, 1944 (nomen dubium)
- Onchidiopsis ushakovi Derjugin, 1937
- Onchidiopsis variegata Derjugin, 1937
- Onchidiopsis zachsi Derjugin, 1937

Species brought into synonymy:

- Onchidiopsis latissima Odhner, 1913 : synonym of Onchidiopsis carnea Bergh, 1853
- Onchidiopsis recondita Bergh, 1853synonym of Onchidiopsis carnea Bergh, 1853 (junior subjective synonym)
- Onchidiopsis reinhardti Mörch, 1868: synonym of Onchidiopsis groenlandica Bergh, 1853 (junior subjective synonym)
