= Marsenina uchidai =

Scientific classification
- Kingdom: Animalia
- Phylum: Mollusca
- Class: Gastropoda
- Subclass: Caenogastropoda
- Order: Littorinimorpha
- Family: Velutinidae
- Genus: Marsenina
- Species: M. uchidai

Binomial name
- Marsenina uchidai Habe, T. 1958

Species of gastropod

Marsenina uchidai is a species of velutinid, a type of gastropod, and appears outwardly similar to a dorid nudibranch. However, it has an internal shell hidden by the mantle. It inhabits Asian boreal waters off of Japan and Russia.

== Description ==
=== Adult ===
It appears similar to other Marsenina species such as Marsenina stearnsii, except that it is more brightly colored, with a spotted brownish-yellow mantle with a slit in the middle, covering the translucent white ear-shaped shell. Its head has two head tentacles with eyespots at the base, typical of velutinid gastropods. Like other Marsenina species, it is a simultaneous hermaphrodite. The penis of this species is described as "beaked, slightly bent" with a "crest above the bend".

=== Shell ===
The shell is fragile, with a low spiral that arcs upwards for 3.5 convex whorls. The final whorl has a long descending shoulder. Like other Marsenina shells, the only surface markings are thin growth lines. The aperture is wide and downwardly oblique. The type specimen shell measures 10 x 13.7 mm.

== Range ==
M. uchidai is a boreal species, known from the Bering Sea (Bering Island), Sea of Okhotsk, southern Kuril Islands, Sakhalin, Sea of Japan (recorded on Bolshoi Pelis Island, part of the Rimsky-Korsakov Archipelago), and the North Pacific (Hokkaido, Japan). It is common in the Sea of Japan on the coasts of Sakhalin and Primorsky Krai.

== Habitat and ecology ==
Very little is known about the habitat and ecology of this species of psychrophile. The depths it inhabits are variously listed as the intertidal to 26 m, 5-60 m, and intertidal to 126 m, on rock, sand and shell, or pebble seafloor. One individual was found in a scientific trawl in the Sea of Okhotsk off the coast of Hokkaido at a depth of 75 m, along with a possible food source, the solitary tunicate Eugyroides glutinans. It is likely that similar to many velutinid species, M. uchidai is eurybathic, meaning it is able to live in shallow to deep water.

== Etymology ==
M. uchidai was initially described from a single shell that had washed up in a shallow water eelgrass meadow near the Akkeshi Marine Biological Station, Hokkaido by Tadashige Habe in 1958. He named the species after Professor Tohru Uchida, who was the director of Akkeshi Marine Biological Station at the time.
