= Lamellarin D =

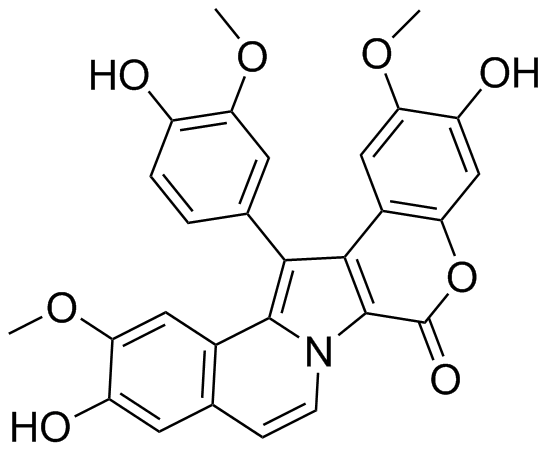

Names
- Preferred IUPAC name 3,11-Dihydroxy-14-(4-hydroxy-3-methoxyphenyl)-2,12-dimethoxy-6H-[1]benzopyrano[4′,3′:4,5]pyrrolo[2,1-a]isoquinolin-6-one

Identifiers
CAS Number	97614-65-8
3D model (JSmol)	Interactive image
ChEMBL	ChEMBL373114
ChemSpider	8067814
PubChem CID	9892144
UNII	YEF6XD93VE
CompTox Dashboard (EPA)	DTXSID501031665
- InChI: InChI=1S/C28H21NO8/c1-34-21-9-14(4-5-17(21)30)24-25-16-11-23(36-3)19(32)12-20(16)37-28(33)27(25)29-7-6-13-8-18(31)22(35-2)10-15(13)26(24)29/h4-12,30-32H,1-3H3 Key: ATHLLZUXVPNPAW-UHFFFAOYSA-N; InChI=1S/C28H21NO8/c1-34-21-9-14(4-5-17(21)30)24-25-16-11-23(36-3)19(32)12-20(16)37-28(33)27(25)29-7-6-13-8-18(31)22(35-2)10-15(13)26(24)29/h4-12,30-32H,1-3H3 Key: ATHLLZUXVPNPAW-UHFFFAOYSA-N
- SMILES: COC1=C(C=CC(=C1)C2=C3C4=CC(=C(C=C4C=CN3C5=C2C6=CC(=C(C=C6OC5=O)O)OC)O)OC)O

Properties
Chemical formula	C_{28}H_{21}NO_{8}
Molar mass	499.475 g·mol^{−1}
- Except where otherwise noted, data are given for materials in their standard state (at 25 °C [77 °F], 100 kPa). Infobox references

Lamellarins are a group of pyrrole alkaloids first isolated in 1985 from the marine mollusk Lamellaria in the waters of Palau. Over 70 lamellarins and similar compounds were subsequently isolated. Other similar compounds include ningalins, lukianols, polycitones, and storniamides.

== Biological activity ==
These compounds have shown a wide variety of biological activity, including reversal of multidrug resistance, HIV-1 integrase inhibition, and antibiotic activity. Lamellarin D, for example, displays strong cytotoxic activity against tumor cell lines, and is a potent topoisomerase I inhibitor.

== Structure ==
The lamellarins all contain a central pyrrole ring, substituted at the 3 and 4 positions by polyhydroxy- or methoxyphenyls. They are divided into two groups, depending on whether the pyrrole ring is fused or unfused.

== Synthesis ==
The lamellarins have been synthesized by a number of groups, including Isibashi, Steglich, Ruchirawat, Banwell, Alvarez, Gupton, Boger, and Handy.

=== Steglich synthesis of lamellarin G trimethyl ether ===
The Steglich synthesis features an oxidative coupling of two benzylic carbons, as well as a Paal-Knorr pyrrole synthesis.

=== Banwell synthesis of lamellarin K ===
The Banwell group’s synthesis of lamellarin K includes an intramolecular azomethine ylide cyclization.

== Gallery ==
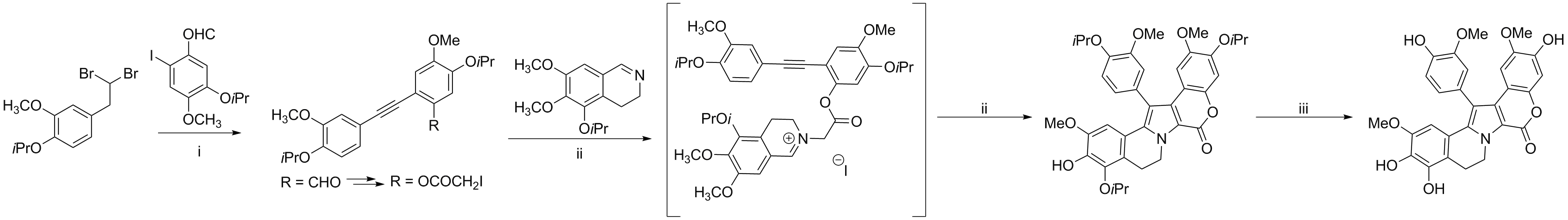
1997 - Lamellarin K synthesis by Banwell: (i) nBuLi, THF, -78 °C, 0.83 h; ZnCl_{2}, -78 °C -> 18 °C, 1 h; aryliodide, Pd(PPh_{3}), 18 °C, 4 h (ii) ClCH_{2}CH_{2}Cl, 18 °C, 7 h; Hunig’s base, 83 °C, 32 h (iii) AlCl_{3}, CH_{2}Cl_{2}, 18 °C, 2 h

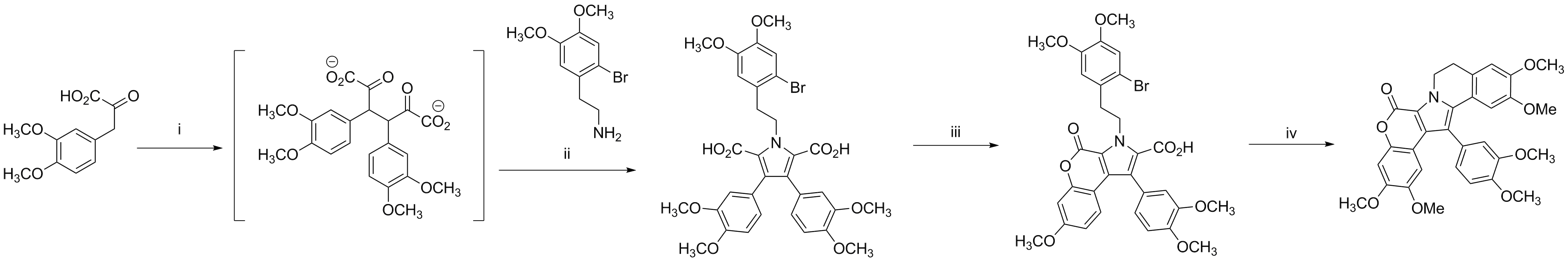
1997 Lamellarin G Trimethyl Ether Synthesis by Steglich: (i) 1. -70 °C, 2 eq. nBuLi; 2. 0.5 eq. I_{2}, -70 °C -> RT (ii) Mol sieves, 12h, RT (iii) EtOAc, 1 eq. Pb(OAc)_{4}, reflux (iv) CH_{3}CN, PPh_{3}, NEt_{3}, Pd(OAc)_{2}

== See also ==
- Pyrrole
