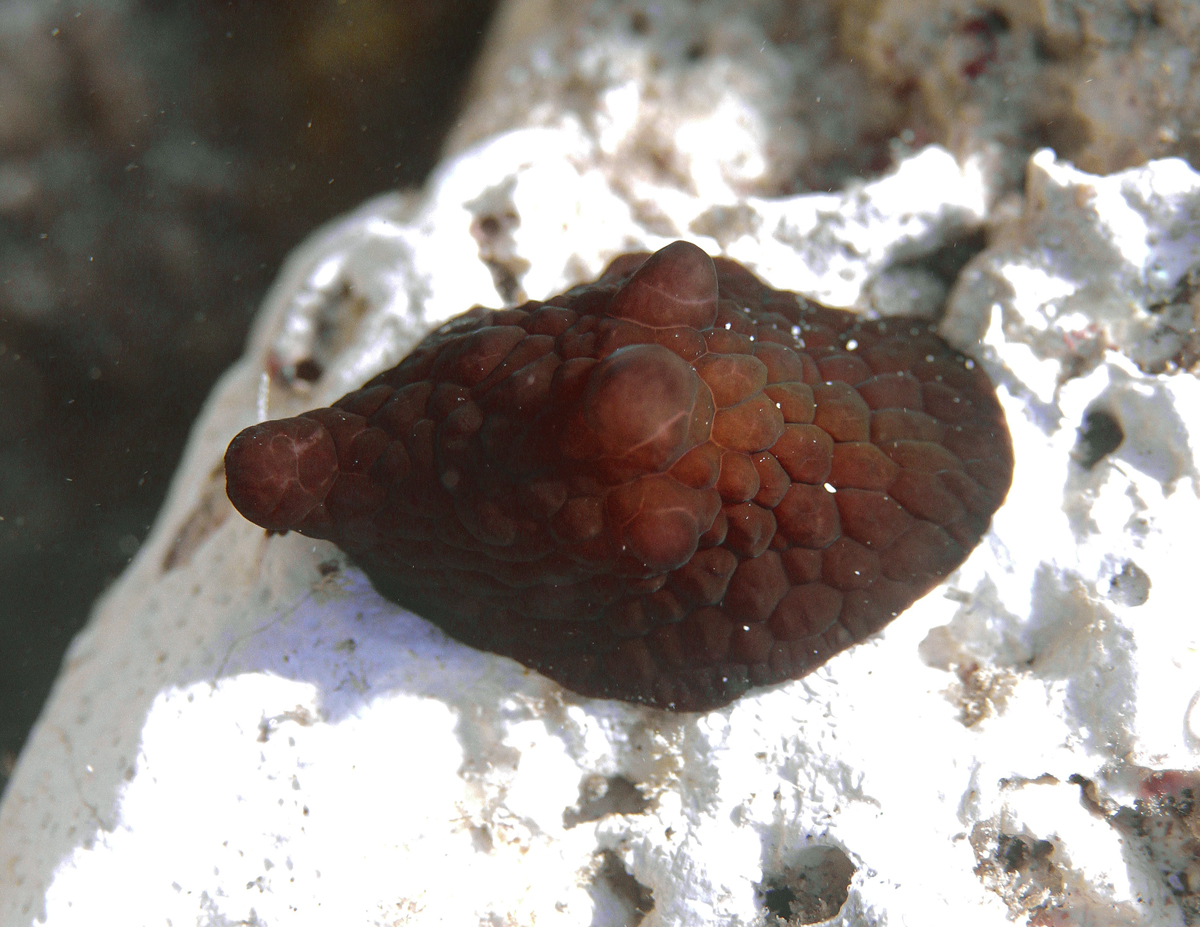
- C. nigra heading left

Scientific classification
- Kingdom: Animalia
- Phylum: Mollusca
- Class: Gastropoda
- Subclass: Caenogastropoda
- Order: Littorinimorpha
- Family: Velutinidae
- Genus: Coriocella
- Species: C. nigra

Binomial name
- Coriocella nigra Blainville, 1824

Synonyms
- Lamellaria nigra (Blainville, 1824); Chelyonotus mauritianus Bergh, 1853; Lamellaria mauritiana (Bergh, 1853); Chelyonotus tonganus var. mauritiana Bergh, 1853; Chelyonotus niger (Blainville, 1824)

= Coriocella nigra =

Species of gastropod

Coriocella nigra is a species of sea snail, a marine gastropod mollusk in the family Velutinidae. An Indo-Pacific species, it lives on rocks at depths of up to 15 m. It is up to 10 cm long and has an internal shell; body color is black or brown. C. nigra is probably a predator of tunicates.

== Taxonomy ==
This species was described as Coriocella nigra by French zoologist Henri Marie Ducrotay de Blainville in 1824 and he placed it in the newly established genus Coriocella as its only species at that time. Coriocella nigra is the type species of the genus Coriocella. Nowadays, at least six other species are recognized in the genus Coriocella and Blainville's binomial name is still treated as valid and in use.

== Distribution ==
The distribution of Coriocella nigra is Indo-Pacific and includes South Africa, Mozambique, Kenya, Madagascar, Mauritius, Réunion, Mayotte, Gulf of Aden, Gulf of Aqaba, South Button Island, Myanmar, Thailand, Indonesia, Papua New Guinea, northern Australia and eastern Australia, Philippines, Palau, Society Islands in French Polynesia, New Caledonia, Japan, and Hawaii. The type locality is Isle de France (Mauritius).

== Description ==
The color of the body may vary from uniformly velvety black to brown. The mantle is broadly tuberculate. The borders of the mantle are delicate, notched in front and spreading out widely. The foot is small and oval. There are four or five lobes or bosses on the dorsal part of its body. There is an inhalant siphon extended in the middle of the front part of the body. The tentacles are triangular, granulated and are spotted with white. There are brown eyes at the base of the tentacles. The front part of the foot is grooved. There is a jaw and a radula with 48 teeth in the mouth. The body length is usually about 80 mm. The body length varies from 15–18 mm up to 10 cm. The width of the body is 8–10 mm (in body length 15–18 mm).

C. nigra has an internal and reduced shell, and spirally rolled radula, as have all the members of the family Velutinidae. The shell is conchinous and it has 2½ or three whorls. Whorls are expanding rapidly and the last whorl cover four fifths of the shell height. The color of the shell is translucent white. The shell is smooth with irregular growth lines. The aperture is large. Shell width is 6.3 mm (for a shell length of 10 mm). Shell length varies from 10 mm to 30–40 mm.

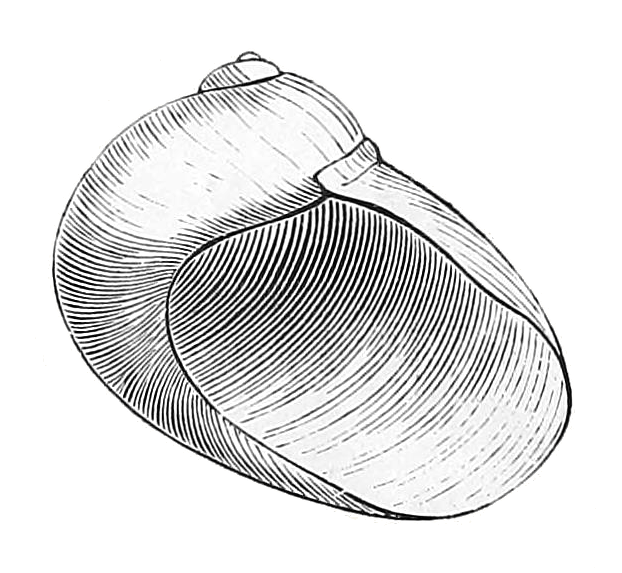
Drawing of an apertural view of a shell of C. nigra.

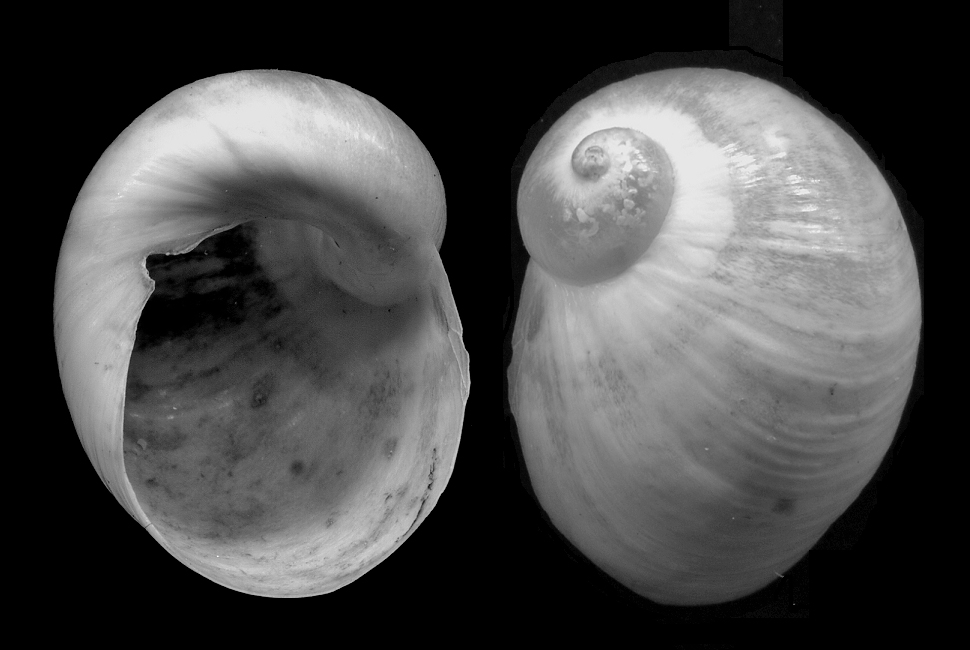
Photo of a shell. Shell length is 19 mm.

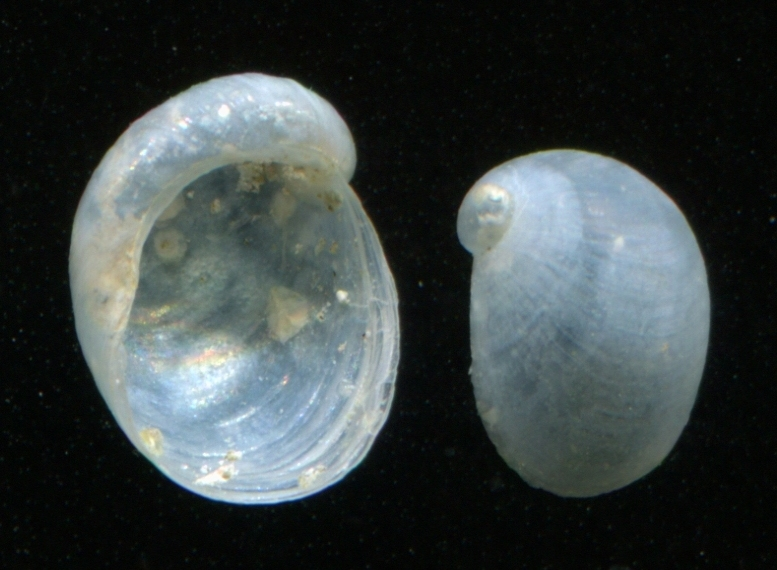
Photo of a shell. Shell length is 8–9 mm.

== Ecology ==
It lives on rocky habitats. On Hawaii it lives among Halimeda kanaloana. In Australia it inhabits intertidal and subtidal zone . It has been reported from depths of 1–4 m, to 12 m and to 15 m.

C. nigra is carnivorous. Its probable prey are tunicates, including tunicates from the family Didemnidae in Hawaii. Its fecal pellets are oval and layered. Sclerites of Octocorallia have also been found in its gut.

The ostracod Pontocypria coriocellae lives as an occasional commensal in the oral tube of C. nigra.

The shell of C. nigra is sometimes used by a hermit crab, Clibanarius virescens.

Staurosporines 4′-N-demethyl-11-hydroxystaurosporine and 3,11-dihydroxystaurosporine have been isolated from C. nigra.
