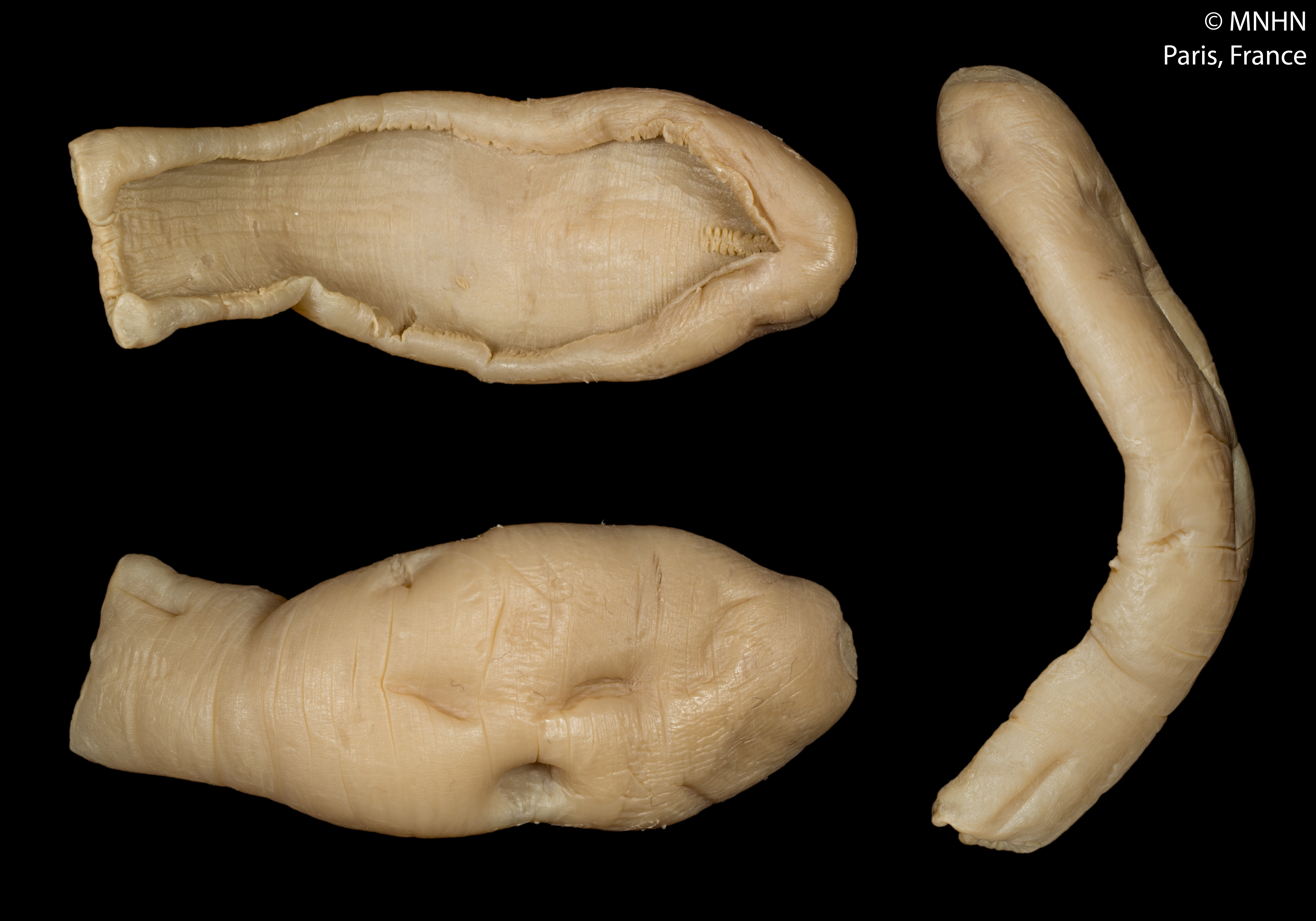
- Marsenina liouvillei (syntype at MNHN, Paris)

Scientific classification
- Kingdom: Animalia
- Phylum: Mollusca
- Class: Gastropoda
- Subclass: Caenogastropoda
- Order: Littorinimorpha
- Superfamily: Velutinoidea
- Family: Velutinidae
- Genus: Marsenina; Gray, 1850

Type species
- Lamellaria prodita Lovén, 1846

Synonyms
- Oithonella Mörch, 1857

= Marsenina =

Genus of gastropods

Marsenina is a genus of small slug-like sea snails, marine gastropod molluscs in the subfamily Velutininae within the family Velutinidae.

== Species ==
Species within the genus Marsenina:

- Marsenina ampla Verrill, 1880 (Atlantic - Maine, USA)
- Marsenina glabra (Couthouy, 1838) - bald lamellaria (Atlantic - Canada to Massachusetts, USA)
- Marsenina globosa L. M. Perry, 1939 (Gulf of Mexico - Pine Island Sound, Florida, USA)
- Marsenina pax Sh. Zhang, Su. Zhang & J. Wang, 2021 (Yellow Sea)
- Marsenina rhombica (Dall, 1871) (Bering Sea, Sea of Japan, North Pacific)
- Marsenina stearnsii (Dall, 1871) (North Pacific - Alaska to central California, USA)
- Marsenina uchidai (Habe, 1958) (Bering Sea (Bering Island), Sea of Okhotsk, southern Kuril Islands, Sakhalin Islands, Sea of Japan, North Pacific (Hokkaido, Japan))
- Marsenina zadei Behrens, Ornelas & Valdés, 2014 (North Pacific from Ten Mile Point, British Columbia to Carmel Point, California)

Taxon inquirendum

- Marsenina liouvillei Vayssière, 1917

Species brought into synonymy

- Marsenina micromphala Bergh, 1853: synonym of Marsenina glabra (Couthouy, 1838)
- Marsenina prodita Lovén, 1846: synonym of * Marsenina glabra (Couthouy, 1838)
