= Onchidiopsis carnea =

Scientific classification
- Kingdom: Animalia
- Phylum: Mollusca
- Class: Gastropoda
- Subclass: Caenogastropoda
- Order: Littorinimorpha
- Family: Velutinidae
- Genus: Onchidiopsis
- Species: O. carnea

Binomial name
- Onchidiopsis carnea Bergh, 1853

Synonyms
- Onchidiopsis latissima Odhner, 1913

Species of gastropod

Onchidiopsis carnea is a species of small sea snail with a transparent internal shell, a marine gastropod mollusk in the family Velutinidae. Because the shell is mostly internal, the snail resembles a sea slug in general appearance.
