= Pseudotorellia =

Scientific classification
- Kingdom: Animalia
- Phylum: Mollusca
- Class: Gastropoda
- Subclass: Caenogastropoda
- Order: Littorinimorpha
- Family: Velutinidae
- Genus: Pseudotorellia; Warén, 1989

Genus of gastropods

Pseudotorellia is a genus of small sea snails with a transparent, more or less internal, shell, marine gastropod mollusks in the family Velutinidae. Because the shell is mostly internal, these snails resemble sea slugs in general appearance.

== Species ==
Species in the genus Pseudotorellia include:

- Pseudotorellia fragilis Warén, 1989
