= Ciliatovelutina =

Scientific classification
- Kingdom: Animalia
- Phylum: Mollusca
- Class: Gastropoda
- Subclass: Caenogastropoda
- Order: Littorinimorpha
- Family: Velutinidae
- Genus: Ciliatovelutina; Golikov & Gulbin, 1990

Genus of gastropods

Ciliatovelutina is a genus of small sea snails, marine gastropod mollusks in the family Velutinidae.

== Species ==
Species within the genus Ciliatovelutina include:

- Ciliatovelutina capillata (Derjugin, 1950)
- Ciliatovelutina lanata (Derjugin, 1950)
- Ciliatovelutina lanigera (Møller, 1842)
- Ciliatovelutina nana (Derjugin, 1950)
