= Marsenina stearnsii =

Scientific classification
- Domain: Eukaryota
- Kingdom: Animalia
- Phylum: Mollusca
- Class: Gastropoda
- Subclass: Caenogastropoda
- Order: Littorinimorpha
- Superfamily: Velutinoidea
- Family: Velutinidae
- Genus: Marsenina
- Species: M. stearnsii

Binomial name
- Marsenina stearnsii (Dall, 1871)

Synonyms
- Lamellaria stearnsii Dall, 1871

Species of gastropod

Marsenina stearnsii is a species of small slug-like sea snail, a marine gastropod mollusc in the family Velutinidae.

== Description ==
The size of an adult shell varies between 15 and 20 millimetres (0.59 and 0.79 in). The thin, translucent white shell is visible through a dorsal pore in the mantle. The finely pitted mantle is white to pale pink with darker spots.

== Distribution ==
This white slug-like snail is known from Alaska and central California. It can be found in the rocky intertidal, often in association with the ascidian Trididemnum opacum. It is relatively rare, found in the low rocky intertidal, usually under rocks on the ascidian Trididemnem opacum which it matches in color and pattern and upon which it preys.
