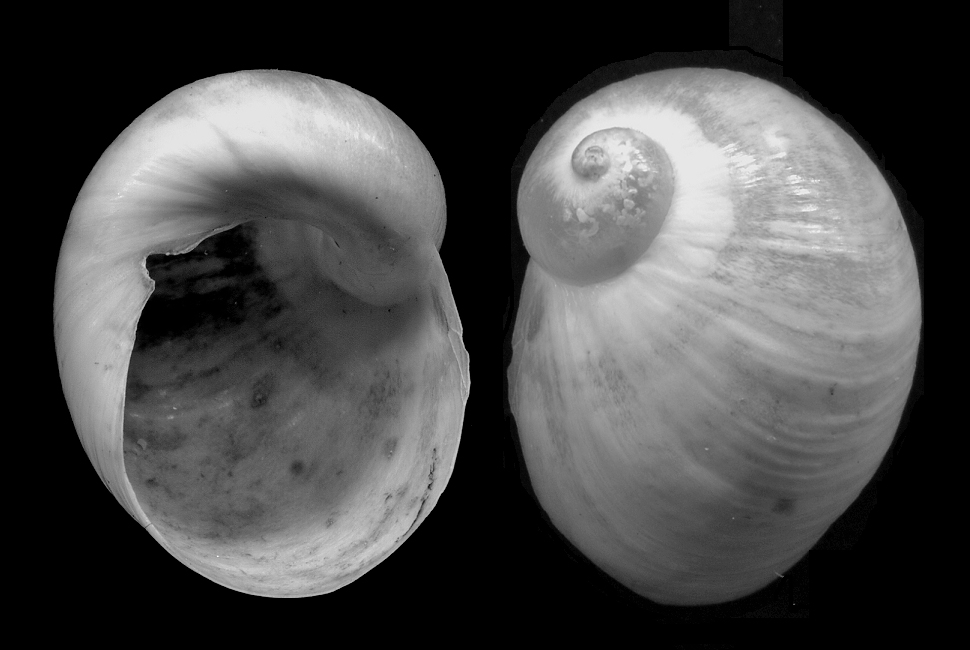
- Shell of Coriocella nigra

Scientific classification
- Kingdom: Animalia
- Phylum: Mollusca
- Class: Gastropoda
- Subclass: Caenogastropoda
- Order: Littorinimorpha
- Superfamily: Velutinoidea
- Family: Velutinidae
- Subfamily: Lamellariinae; Orbigny, 1841

Synonyms
- Coriocellidae Troschel, 1848; Lamellariidae d'Orbigny, 1841 (original rank); Marseniidae Leach, 1847; Pseudosacculinae Kuroda, 1933; Sacculidae Thiele, 1929 (invalid: type genus a junior homonym)

= Lamellariinae =

Subfamily of gastropods

Lamellariinae is a subfamily of small slug-like sea snails, marine gastropod molluscs belonging to the family Velutinidae, in the order Littorinimorpha. This subfamily is unique within Velutinidae for having a radula that lacks marginal teeth (dental formula: 0:1:1:1:0).

== Description ==
Species with internal shell, hidden beneath a papillate mantle with lateral flaps. These flaps are in some genera fused to enclose the shell. The thin shell is smooth and contains two to three whorls of which the body whorl is rapidly expanding into a large aperture. Some species have a thick, hairy periostracum. They resemble dorid nudibranches, but differ by their smooth tentacles and the absence of a dorsal gill circlet.

Most species are carnivores feeding mainly on ascidians, tunicates and cnidarians.

== Genera ==
Genera in the subfamily Lamellariinae include:

- Calyptoconcha Bouchet & Waren, 1993
- Coriocella Blainville, 1824
- Hainotis F. Riedel, 2000
- Lamellaria Montagu, 1815
- Mysticoncha Allan, 1936
- Pseudosacculus Hirase, 1928
- Genus Echinospira Krohn, 1853 (uncertain status)

Synonyms

- Chelinotus Swainson, 1840: synonym of Coriocella Blainville, 1824
- Chelyonotus Herrmannsen, 1846: synonym of Chelinotus Swainson, 1840: synonym of Coriocella Blainville, 1824 (unjustified emendation)
- Cryptocella H. Adams & A. Adams, 1853: synonym of Lamellaria Montagu, 1816 (junior objective synonym of Lamellaria)
- Djiboutia Vayssière, 1912: synonym of Lamellaria Montagu, 1816
- Marsenia Oken, 1823: synonym of Lamellaria Montagu, 1816
- Sacculus Hirase, 1927: synonym of Pseudosacculus Hirase, 1928 (non Gosse, 1851)
