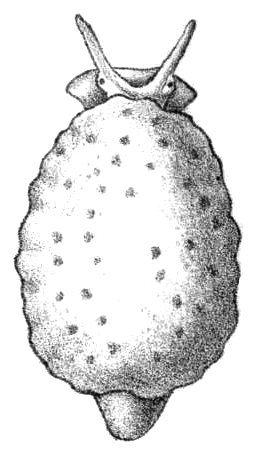
- Drawing of dorsal view of live animal of Onchidiopsis glacialis

Scientific classification
- Kingdom: Animalia
- Phylum: Mollusca
- Class: Gastropoda
- Subclass: Caenogastropoda
- Order: Littorinimorpha
- Family: Velutinidae
- Genus: Onchidiopsis
- Species: O. glacialis

Binomial name
- Onchidiopsis glacialis (Sars, 1851)

Synonyms
- Lamellaria glacialis Sars, 1851

= Onchidiopsis glacialis =

Species of gastropod

Onchidiopsis glacialis is a species of small sea snail with a transparent internal shell, a marine gastropod mollusk in the family Velutinidae. Because the shell is mostly internal, the snail resembles a sea slug in general appearance.

== Distribution ==
The distribution of Onchidiopsis glacialis includes European waters.

== Description ==
The maximum recorded (shell?) length is 18 mm.

== Habitat ==
The minimum recorded depth for this species is 4 m; maximum recorded depth is 300 m.
