= Piliscus =

Scientific classification
- Kingdom: Animalia
- Phylum: Mollusca
- Class: Gastropoda
- Subclass: Caenogastropoda
- Order: Littorinimorpha
- Family: Velutinidae
- Genus: Piliscus; Lovén, 1859

Genus of gastropods

Piliscus is a genus of small sea snails with transparent internal shells, marine gastropod mollusks in the family Velutinidae. Because the shell is mostly internal, these snails resemble sea slugs in general appearance.

== Species ==
Species within the genus Piliscus include:

- Piliscus commodus (Middendorff, 1851)
- Piliscus krebsii
- Piliscus probus
- Piliscus rostratus (Golikov & Gulbin, 1990)
- Piliscus undulatus (Golikov & Gulbin, 1990)
