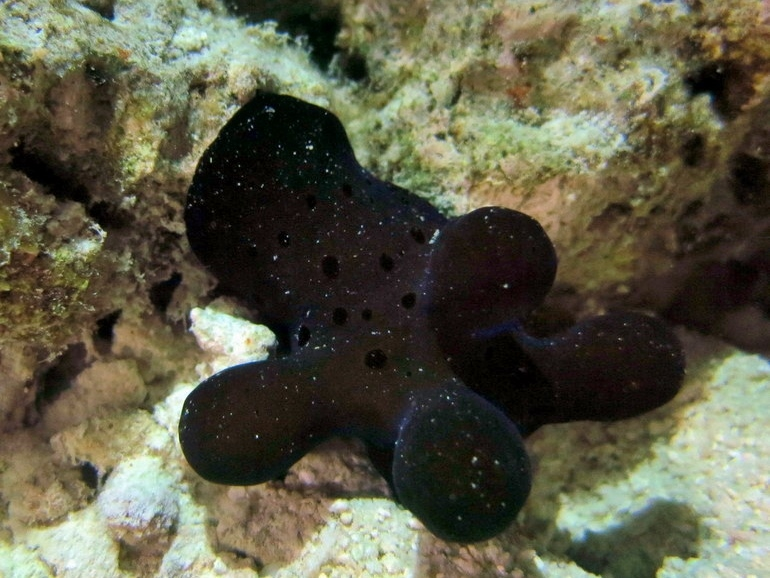
- Coriocella hibyae in Landaa Giraavaru (Maldives, Baa Atoll).

Scientific classification
- Kingdom: Animalia
- Phylum: Mollusca
- Class: Gastropoda
- Subclass: Caenogastropoda
- Order: Littorinimorpha
- Family: Velutinidae
- Subfamily: Lamellariinae
- Genus: Coriocella; Blainville, 1824

Type species
- Coriocella nigra Blainville, 1824

= Coriocella =

Genus of gastropods

Coriocella is a genus of small slug-like sea snails, marine gastropod molluscs in the family Velutinidae.

== Description ==
The ear-shaped shell is extremely thin, even membranous in part and concealed in the mantle. It has a small spiral turn at the apex. The aperture is very large. The shell lacks a columella.

The soft body is elliptical and much depressed. The borders of the mantle are very thin, notched in front and spreading out widely. The oval foot is very small. The head is scarcely distinct. The two short and rather thick tentacles are contractile and concealed under the shield. The eyes are situated at the base of the tentacles.

== Species ==
Species within the genus Coriocella include:

- Coriocella fella Er. Marcus & Ev. Marcus, 1970
- Coriocella herberti Drivas & Jay, 1990
- Coriocella hibyae Wellens, 1991
- Coriocella jayi Wellens, 1995
- Coriocella nigra Blainville, 1824 - type species of the genus Coriocella
- Coriocella safagae Wellens, 1999
- Coriocella tongana (Quoy & Gaimard, 1832)
