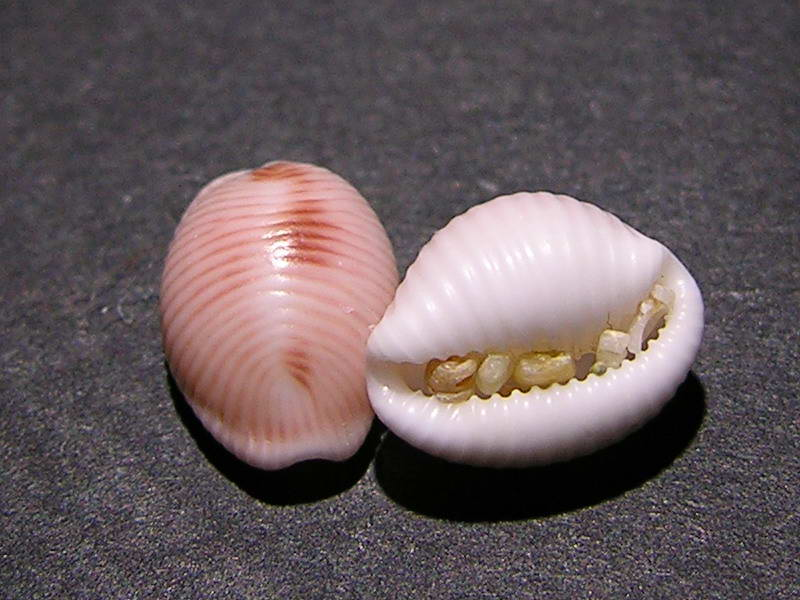
- Beachworn shells of Trivia merces (family Triviidae), with sand grains trapped in the aperture

Scientific classification
- Kingdom: Animalia
- Phylum: Mollusca
- Class: Gastropoda
- Subclass: Caenogastropoda
- Order: Littorinimorpha
- Superfamily: Velutinoidea; J. E. Gray, 1840

Families
- See text

= Velutinoidea =

Superfamily of gastropods

Velutinoidea is a superfamily of sea snails, marine gastropod molluscs in the order Littorinimorpha.

== Taxonomy ==
- Family Velutinidae Gray, 1840
  - Subfamily Velutininae Gray, 1840
  - Subfamily Lamellariinae d'Orbigny, 1841
  - Subfamily Marseniopsinae Fassio, Bouchet, Schiaparelli & Oliverio, 2022, sister to all other Velutinidae
  - Subfamily Hainotinae Fassio, Bouchet, Schiaparelli & Oliverio, 2022, sister to the clade formed by Velutininae and Lamellariinae
- Family Triviidae Troschel, 1863
  - Subfamily Eratoinae Gill, 1871
  - Subfamily Triviinae Troschel, 1863

This classification follows the study by Ponder & Warén, published in 1988. However, there were some adaptations for the family Triviidae, based on the study by Schilder, published in 1966.
