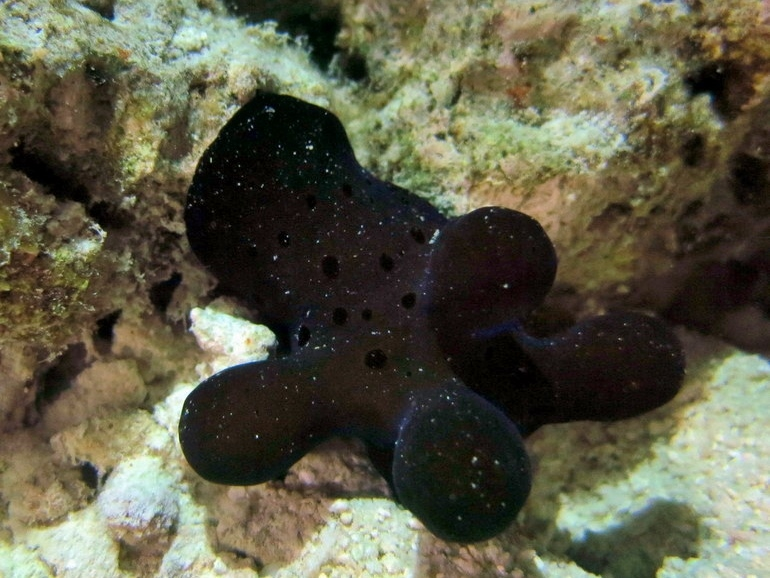
- Coriocella hibyae in Maldives.

Scientific classification
- Kingdom: Animalia
- Phylum: Mollusca
- Class: Gastropoda
- Subclass: Caenogastropoda
- Order: Littorinimorpha
- Superfamily: Velutinoidea
- Family: Velutinidae; Gray, 1840

Genera
- See text

Synonyms
- Lamellariidae d’Orbigny, 1841

= Velutinidae =

Family of gastropods

Velutinidae is a family of small sea snails, marine gastropod molluscs in the clade Littorinimorpha.

== Description ==
The length of the shell varies between 25 mm and 40 mm.

The shell of these animals is very thin and delicate, and internal, completely covered by the mantle (which has fused lobes) so the appearance of these animals more closely resembles that of dorid sea slugs rather than sea snails, but anatomically quite different. They are readily distinguished by the anterior siphon and typically snail-like, tentacle-bearing head beneath the anterior mantle. There are no rhinophores (chemosensory tentacles) or dorsal circlet of gills.

The shell is present but is completely internal. It is covered by a fleshy mantle. The ventral surface features a distinct foot and a head bearing tentacles with basal eyes. The anterior of the dorsal surface (notum) is indented along the midline, forming a short siphon. The mantle is relatively firm but has a somewhat gelatinous texture, appearing mostly smooth. The internal shell resembles an ear, being thin and fragile.

The colour is translucent, greyish-white to pinkish or yellow with black/brown spots and blotches. This colouration is variable, resembling that of the ascidian prey on which they live and feed and thus providing camouflage.

== Taxonomy ==
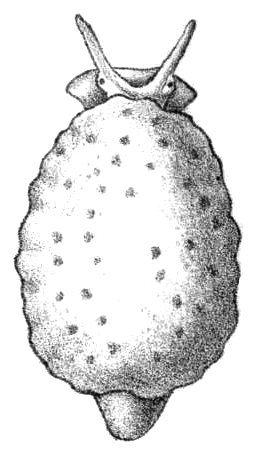
Drawing of dorsal view of live animal of Onchidiopsis glacialis

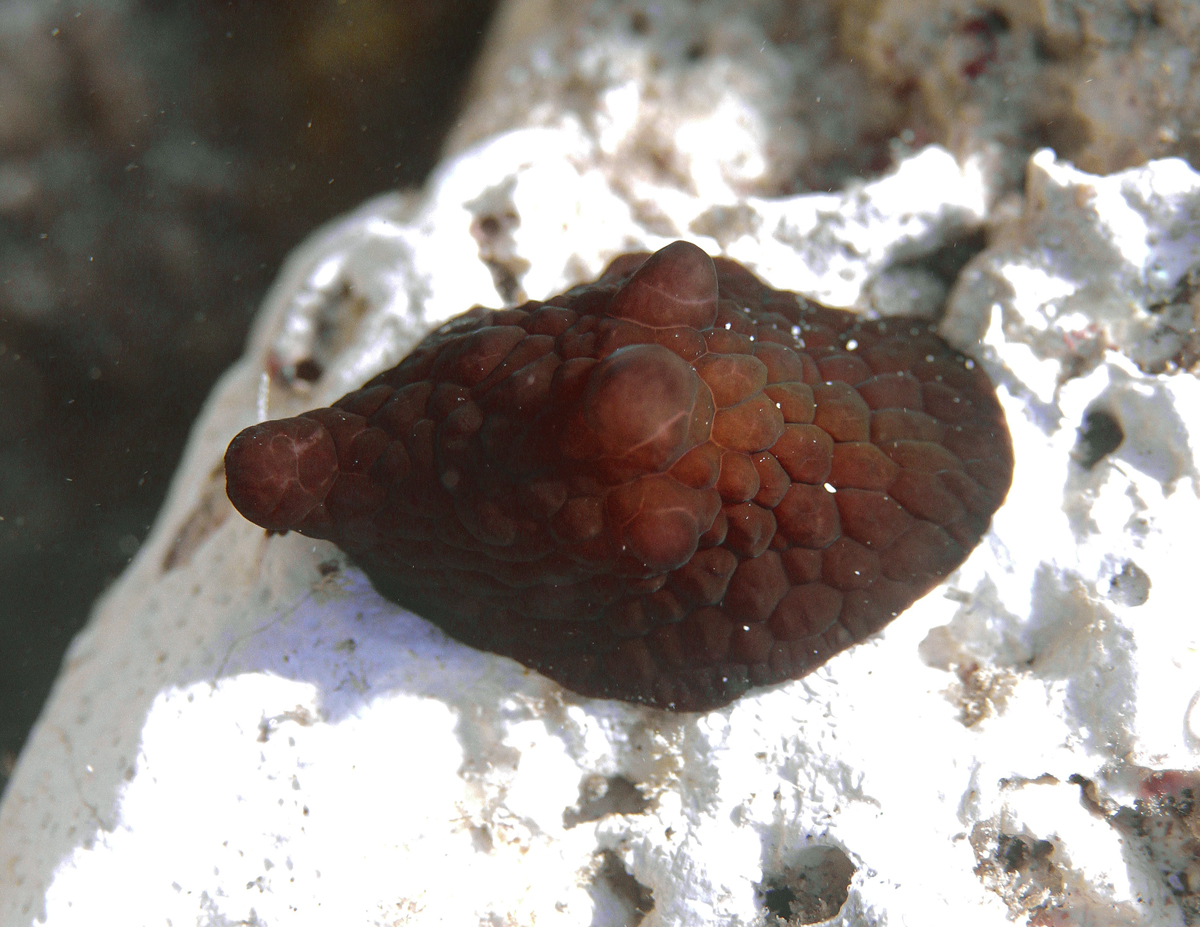
Coriocella nigra

The following subfamilies were recognized in the taxonomy of Bouchet & Rocroi (2005):

- Subfamily Velutininae J. E. Gray, 1840 - synonyms: Marseniidae Leach in Gray, 1847; Marsenininae Odhner, 1913; Capulacmaeinae Golikov & Gulbin, 1990; Onchidiopsinae Golikov & Gulbin, 1990 (n.a.); Marseniopsidae Badel, 1993 (n.a.)
- Subfamily Lamellariinae A. D. d'Orbigny, 1841 - synonyms: Coriocellidae Troschel, 1848; Sacculidae Thiele, 1929 (inv.); Pseudosacculidae Kuroda, 1933

The following subfamilies were additionally recognized in the updated taxonomy of Fassio, Bouchet, Schiaparelli & Oliverio (2022):

- Subfamily Marseniopsinae Fassio, Bouchet, Schiaparelli & Oliverio, 2022, sister to all other Velutinidae
- Subfamily Hainotinae Fassio, Bouchet, Schiaparelli & Oliverio, 2022, sister to the clade formed by Velutininae and Lamellariinae

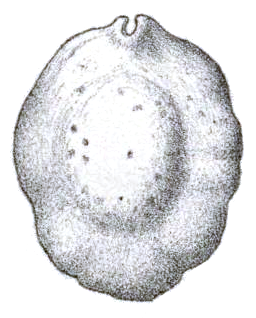
Drawing of dorsal view of live animal of Lamellaria latens

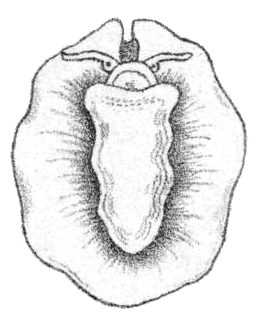
Drawing of ventral view of live animal of Lamellaria latens

== Genera ==
Genera within the family Velutinidae sorted into currently accepted subfamilies:

Subfamily Hainotinae Fassio, Bouchet, Schiaparelli & Oliverio, 2022:

- Hainotis F. Riedel, 2000
- Mysticoncha J.K. Allan, 1936

Subfamily Lamellariinae A.D. d'Orbigny, 1841

- Calyptoconcha A. E. Verrill, 1880
- Coriocella Blainville, 1824
- Djiboutia Vayssière, 1912
- Lamellaria G. Montagu, 1815
- Marsenia Oken, 1823
- Marseniella Bergh, 1886
- Pacifica Fassio, Bouchet & Oliverio, 2022
- Variolipallium Fassio, Bouchet & Oliverio, 2022

Subfamily Marseniopsinae Fassio, Bouchet, Schiaparelli & Oliverio, 2022:

- Lamellariopsis Vayssière, 1906
- Marseniopsis Bergh, 1886

Subfamily Velutininae J. E. Gray, 1840:

- Cartilagovelutina A.N. Golikov & Gulbin, 1990
- Ciliatovelutina A.N. Golikov & Gulbin, 1990
- Cilifera A.N. Golikov & Gulbin, 1990
- Limneria H. Adams & A. Adams, 1851
- Marsenina J. E. Gray, 1850
- Onchidiopsis Bergh, 1853
- Piliscus Lovén, 1859
- Pseudosacculus S. Hirase, 1928
- Pseudotorellia Warén, 1989
- Torellivelutina J. H. McLean, 2000
- Velutina J. Fleming, 1820

Genera brought into synonymy:

- Capulacmaea M. Sars, 1859 : synonym of Piliscus Lovén, 1859
- Chelinotus Swainson, 1840: synonym of Coriocella Blainville, 1824
- Cryptocella H. Adams & A. Adams, 1853: synonym of Lamellaria Montagu, 1815
- Marsenia Oken, 1823: synonym of Lamellaria Montagu, 1815
- Marvillia [sic]: synonym of Limneria H. Adams & A. Adams, 1851
- Morvillia Gray, 1857: synonym of Limneria H. Adams & A. Adams, 1851
- Oithonella Mörch, 1857: synonym of Marsenina Gray, 1850
- Oncidiopsis [sic]: synonym of Onchidiopsis Bergh, 1853
- Pilidium Middendorff, 1851: synonym of Piliscus Lovén, 1859
- Pseudoacculus [sic]: synonym of Pseudosacculus Hirase, 1928
- Sacculus Hirase, 1927: synonym of Pseudosacculus Hirase, 1928
- Velutella Gray, 1847: synonym of Velutina Fleming, 1820

Nomen dubium:

- Echinospira Krohn, 1853

== Sources ==
- Philippe Bouchet, Rocroi J.P., Hausdorf B., Kaim A., Kano Y., Nützel A., Parkhaev P., Schrödl M. & Strong E.E. (2017). Revised classification, nomenclator and typification of gastropod and monoplacophoran families. Malacologia. 61(1-2): 1-526.
