= Astarte (disambiguation) =

Astarte is an ancient Semitic goddess.

Astarte may also refer to:

== Arts ==
- Astarte, an 1891 collection of erotic verse by Pierre Louÿs
- Astarté, a 1901 opera by Xavier Leroux
- Astarte, a 1931 novel by Swedish author Karin Boye
- Astarte (ballet), a 1967 ballet by Robert Joffrey
- Astarte (band), an all-female black metal band from Athens, Greece
- Astarte, a painting by John Singer Sargent

== Biology ==
- Astarte (bivalve), a bivalve mollusc genus in the family Astartidae
  - Astarte borealis, a bivalve mollusc species in this genus
  - Astarte castanea, idem
  - Astarte elliptica, idem
  - Astarte subaequilatera, idem
  - Astarte undata, idem
- Boloria astarte, a butterfly of the family Nymphalidae
- Callicore astarte, a butterfly of the family Nymphalidae
- Astartea, a genus of flowering plant in western Australia

== Places ==
- Mount Astarte, a mountain in the Pantheon Range of British Columbia, Canada
- Astarte Horn, a mountain peak on Alexander Island, Antarctica
- 672 Astarte, a minor planet discovered in 1908

== Use in fiction ==
- Astarte, sometimes Sailor Astarte, an original character in Sailor Moon musicals
- In Zadig, Astarté is the queen of Babylon and Zadig's final love interest
- In Manfred, by Lord Byron, Astarte is the name of Manfred's lost love
- Astartes, or Adeptus Astartes, a Warhammer 40,000 table-top wargame army more commonly known as the Space Marines
- A Gallentean Command Ship class in the game Eve Online

== Other uses ==
- Prix d'Astarté, former title of the Prix Rothschild, a Group 1 flat horse race in France
- Astarte Education, a Norwegian private school opened in 2007 by Princess Märtha Louise
- HMS Astarte, a cancelled Amphion-class submarine

== See also ==
- Ishtar (disambiguation), the Mesopotamian counterpart
