= Ishar (disambiguation) =

Ishar is a series of three role-playing computer games by Silmarils.

Ishar may also refer to:

- Ishar Bindra (born 1921), Indian American investor, entrepreneur and philanthropist
- Ishar Singh (1895–1963), Indian soldier and Victoria Cross recipient
- Ishar Singh (poet) (1892–1966), Punjabi satirical poet
- Ishar Singh (Sikh prince) (1802–1804), prince of the Sikh Empire
- Ishar Singh Marhana (1878–1941), Indian activist and revolutionary
- Ishtup-Ishar, king of the second Mariote kingdom who reigned c. 2400 BC

== See also ==
- Ishara (disambiguation)
- Ishtar (disambiguation)
