= Astartoidea =

Astartoidea Temporal range: 485.4–254.17 Ma

Scientific classification
- Kingdom: Animalia
- Phylum: Mollusca
- Class: Bivalvia
- Order: Carditida
- Superfamily: Astartoidea d'Orbigny, 1844

Families
- Astartidae; Cardiniidae

Superfamily of molluscs

Astartoidea is a superfamily of bivalves in the order Carditida. In the World Register of Marine Species (WoRMS), it is considered a junior synonym of Crassatelloidea, whereas in ITIS Crassatelloidea is a separate superfamily containing Crassatellidae.

== List of families ==
According to ITIS:

- Astartidae
- Cardiniidae – classified in Carditoidea by WoRMS
