= Bichoristes wareni =

Scientific classification
- Kingdom: Animalia
- Phylum: Mollusca
- Class: Gastropoda
- Subclass: Vetigastropoda
- Family: Choristellidae
- Genus: Bichoristes
- Species: B. wareni

Binomial name
- Bichoristes wareni McLean, 1992

Species of gastropod

Bichoristes wareni is a species of sea snail, a marine gastropod mollusk in the family Lepetellidae.
