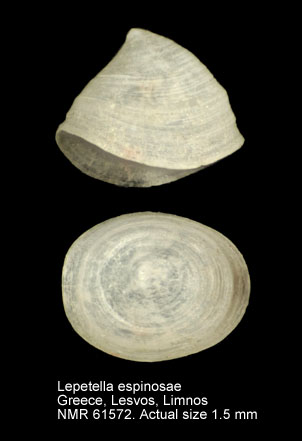

Scientific classification
- Kingdom: Animalia
- Phylum: Mollusca
- Class: Gastropoda
- Subclass: Vetigastropoda
- Order: Lepetellida
- Family: Lepetellidae
- Genus: Lepetella
- Species: L. espinosae

Binomial name
- Lepetella espinosae Dantart & Luque, 1994

= Lepetella espinosae =

Species of gastropod

Lepetella espinosae is a species of sea snail, a marine gastropod mollusk in the family Lepetellidae.

== Description ==
The shell grows to a size of 1.5 mm.

== Distribution ==
This species occurs in the Mediterranean Sea.
