= Bogia labronica =

Scientific classification
- Kingdom: Animalia
- Phylum: Mollusca
- Class: Gastropoda
- Subclass: Vetigastropoda
- Order: Lepetellida
- Family: Lepetellidae
- Genus: Bogia
- Species: B. labronica

Binomial name
- Bogia labronica (Bogi, 1984)

Species of gastropod

Bogia labronica is a species of sea snail, a marine gastropod mollusk in the family Lepetellidae.

== Distribution ==
This species occurs in the Mediterranean Sea.
