= Choristella vitrea =

Scientific classification
- Kingdom: Animalia
- Phylum: Mollusca
- Class: Gastropoda
- Subclass: Vetigastropoda
- Family: Choristellidae
- Genus: Choristella
- Species: C. vitrea

Binomial name
- Choristella vitrea (Kuroda & Habe, 1971)

Synonyms
- Choristes vitreus Kuroda & Habe, 1971

Species of gastropod

Choristella vitrea is a species of sea snail, a marine gastropod mollusk in the family Choristellidae.

== Description ==
The shell grows to a size of 3.5 mm.

== Distribution ==
This species occurs in the Pacific Ocean off Japan.
