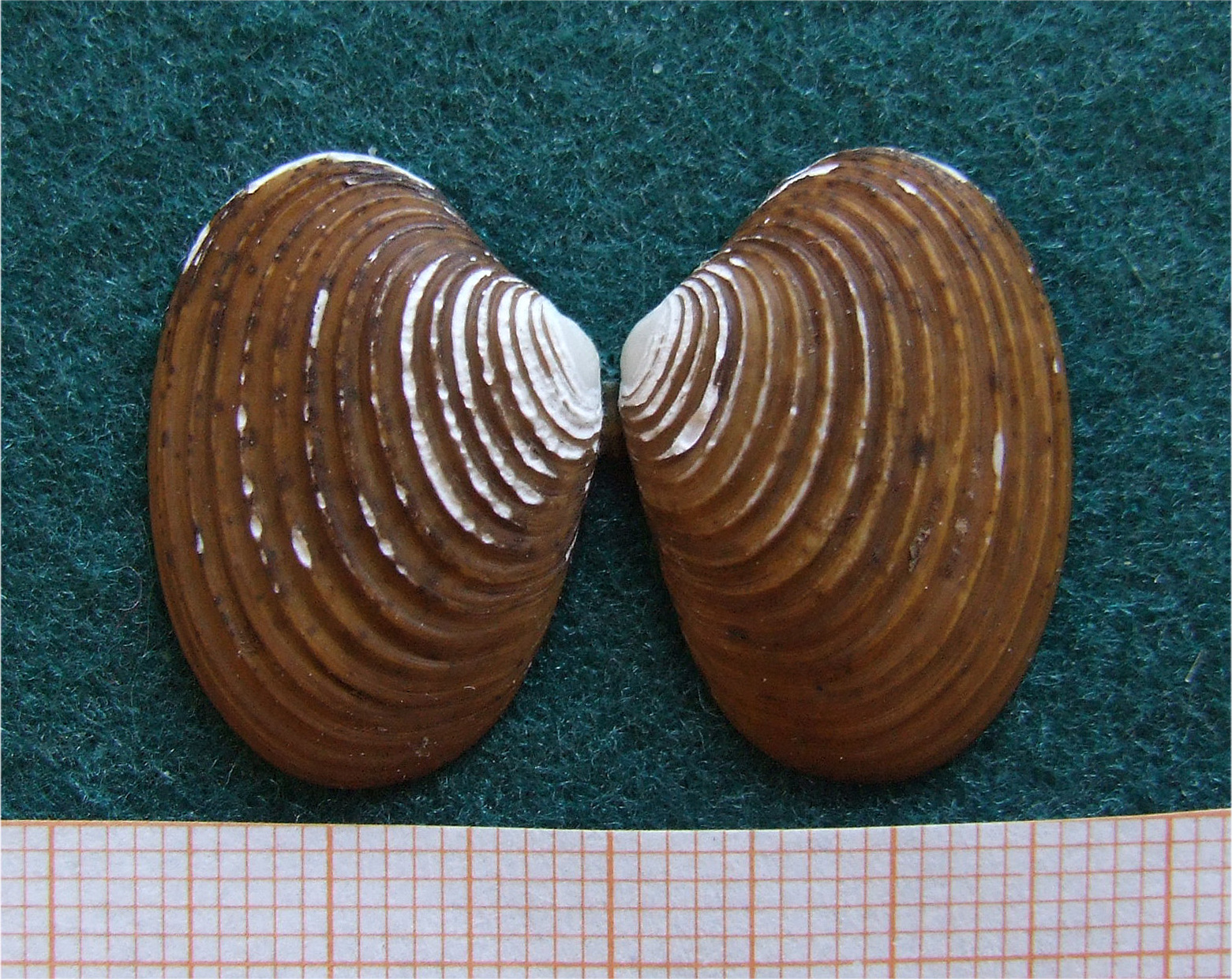

Scientific classification
- Kingdom: Animalia
- Phylum: Mollusca
- Class: Bivalvia
- Order: Carditida
- Superfamily: Crassatelloidea
- Family: Astartidae
- Genus: Astarte
- Species: A. elliptica

Binomial name
- Astarte elliptica (T. Brown, 1827)

Synonyms
- Crassina elliptica T. Brown, 1827; Crassina ovata T. Brown, 1829; Astarte intermedia G. B. Sowerby II, 1855; Astarte elonga Høpner Petersen, 2001

= Astarte elliptica =

Species of bivalve

Astarte elliptica, or the "elliptical astarte", is a species of bivalve mollusc in the family Astartidae. It can be found along the Atlantic coast of North America, ranging from Greenland to Massachusetts.

Right and left valve of the same specimen:

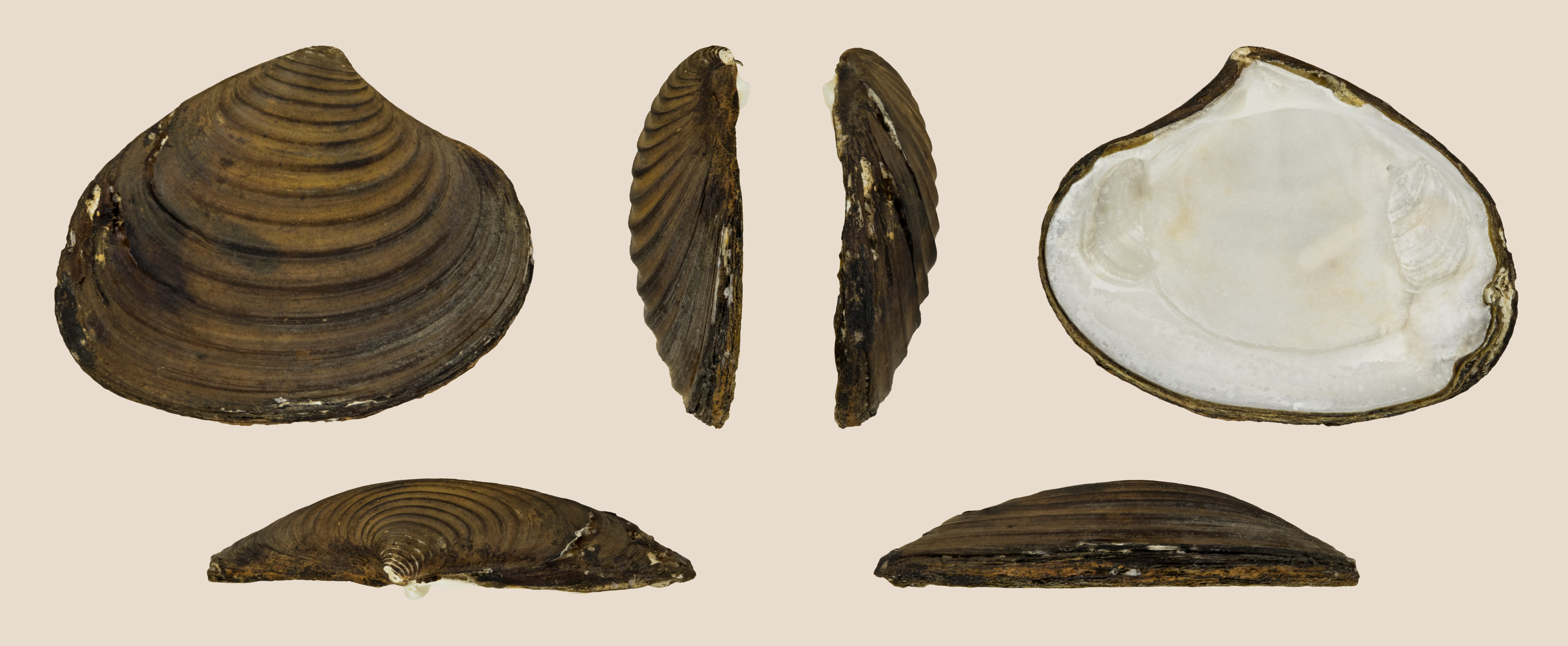
Right valve

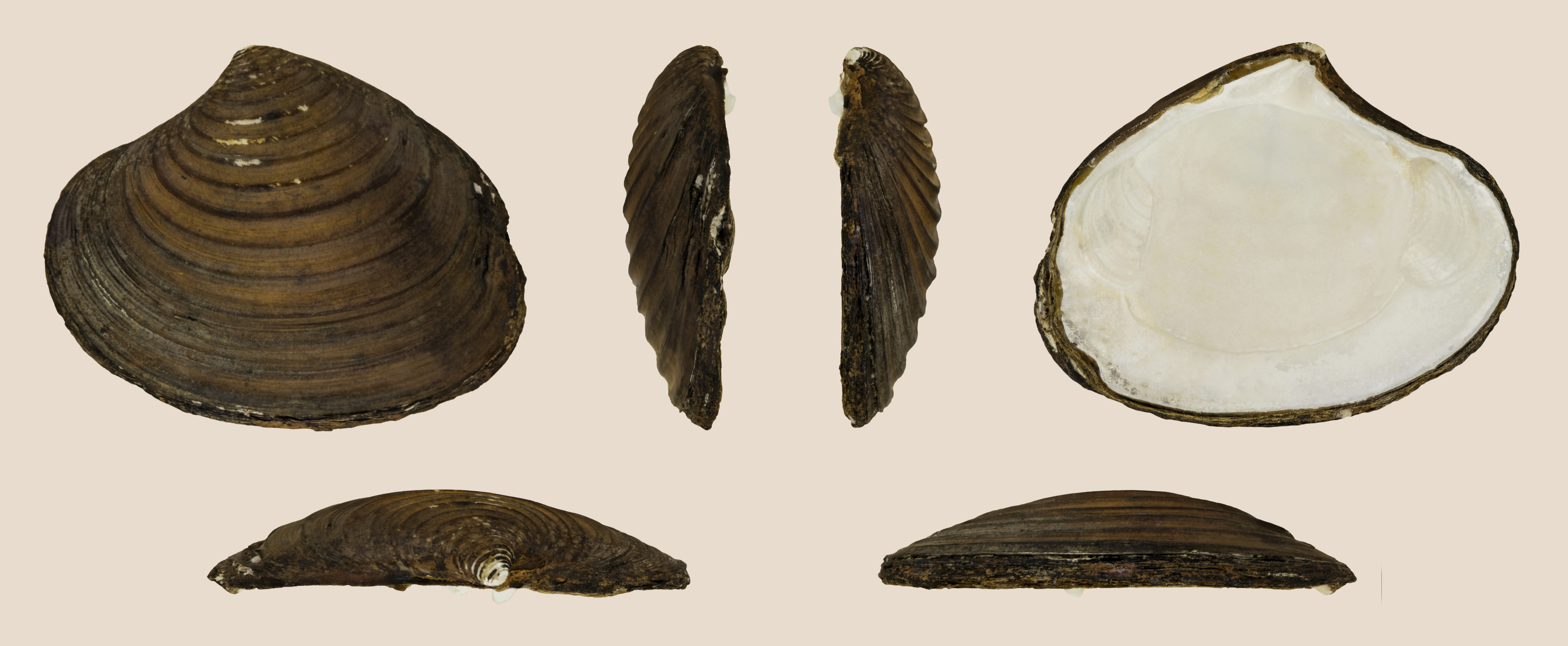
Left valve
