= Choristella marshalli =

Scientific classification
- Kingdom: Animalia
- Phylum: Mollusca
- Class: Gastropoda
- Subclass: Vetigastropoda
- Family: Choristellidae
- Genus: Choristella
- Species: C. marshalli

Binomial name
- Choristella marshalli McLean, 1992

Species of gastropod

Choristella marshalli is a species of sea snail, a marine gastropod mollusk in the family Choristellidae.

== Distribution ==
This marine species is endemic to New Zealand.
