= Tecticrater subcompressus =

Scientific classification
- Kingdom: Animalia
- Phylum: Mollusca
- Class: Gastropoda
- Subclass: Vetigastropoda
- Order: Lepetellida
- Family: Lepetellidae
- Genus: Tecticrater
- Species: T. subcompressus

Binomial name
- Tecticrater subcompressus (Powell, 1937)

Synonyms
- Tecticrater subcompressa Powell, 1937; Tectisumen subcompressa Powell, 1937

Species of gastropod

Tecticrater subcompressus is a species of very small deepwater limpet, a marine gastropod mollusc in the family Lepetellidae. The species was originally described by Arthur William Baden Powell as Tectisumen subcompressa in 1937.

== Distribution ==
This marine species is endemic to New Zealand.
