= Tecticrater finlayi =

Scientific classification
- Kingdom: Animalia
- Phylum: Mollusca
- Class: Gastropoda
- Subclass: Vetigastropoda
- Order: Lepetellida
- Family: Lepetellidae
- Genus: Tecticrater
- Species: T. finlayi

Binomial name
- Tecticrater finlayi (Powell, 1937)

Synonyms
- Tectisumen finlayi Powell, 1937

Species of gastropod

Tecticrater finlayi is a species of very small deepwater limpet, a marine gastropod mollusc in the family Lepetellidae.

== Distribution ==
This marine species is endemic to New Zealand.
