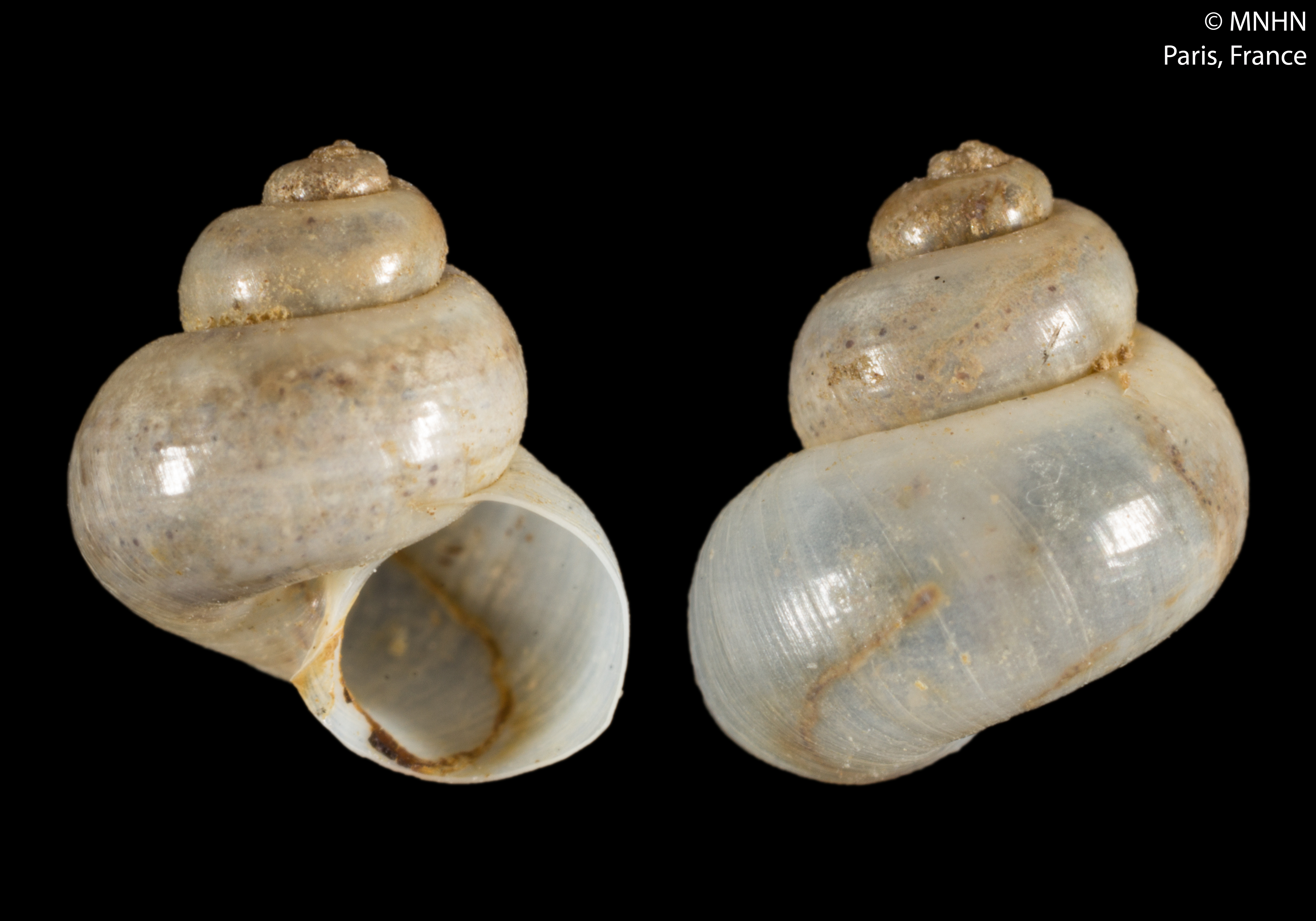
- Shell of Choristella nofronii (paratype at MNHN, Paris]

Scientific classification
- Kingdom: Animalia
- Phylum: Mollusca
- Class: Gastropoda
- Subclass: Vetigastropoda
- Family: Choristellidae
- Genus: Choristella
- Species: C. nofronii

Binomial name
- Choristella nofronii McLean, 1992

Synonyms
- Cithna naticiformis Jeffreys, 1883

= Choristella nofronii =

Species of gastropod

Choristella nofronii is a species of sea snail, a marine gastropod mollusk in the family Choristellidae.

== Description ==
The shell grows to a size of 3 mm.

== Distribution ==
This species occurs in the Northern Atlantic Ocean; off Spain and Portugal; in the Mediterranean Sea.
