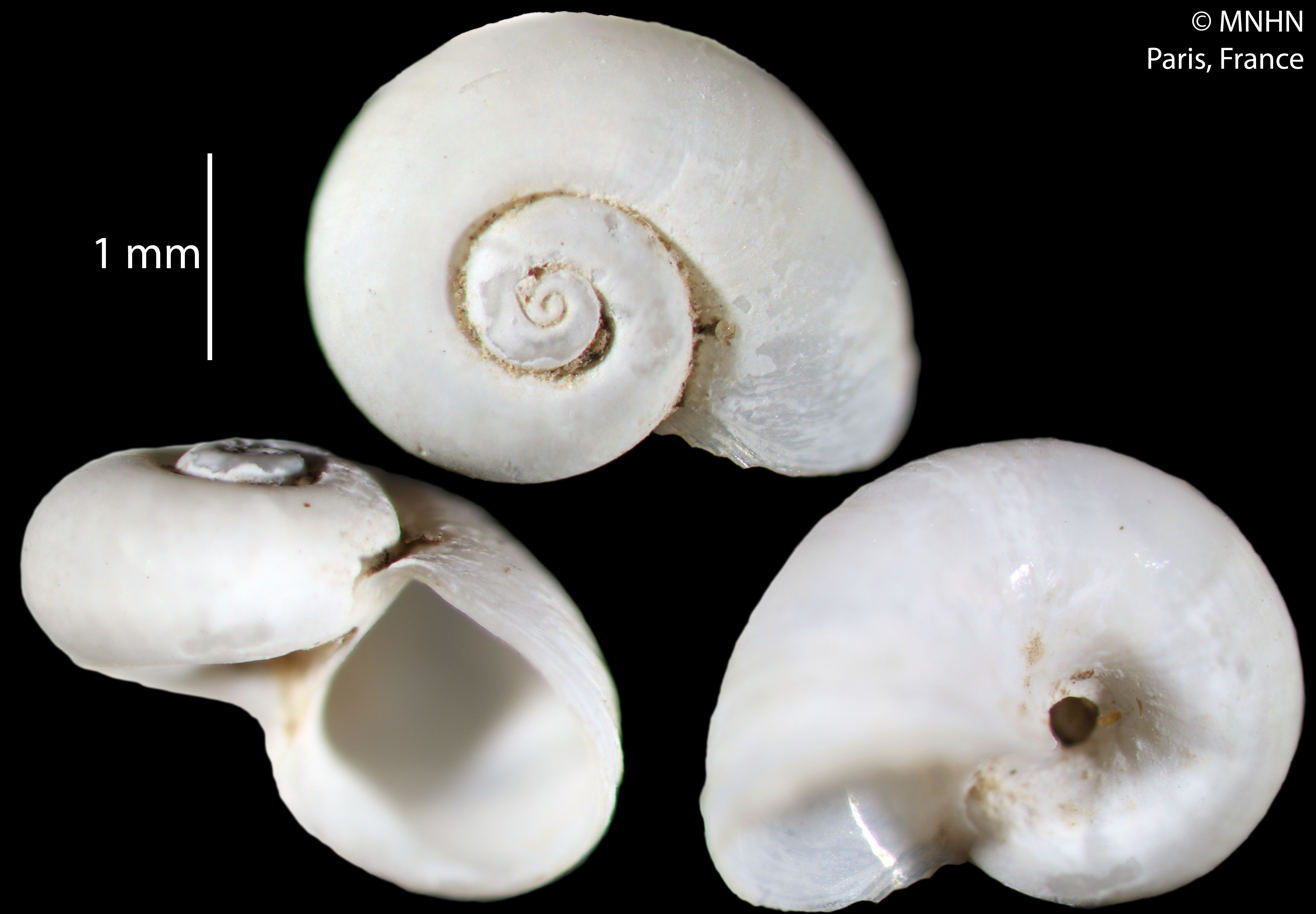
- Shell of Choristella ponderi (paratype at MNHN, Paris)

Scientific classification
- Kingdom: Animalia
- Phylum: Mollusca
- Class: Gastropoda
- Subclass: Vetigastropoda
- Family: Choristellidae
- Genus: Choristella
- Species: C. ponderi

Binomial name
- Choristella ponderi McLean, 1992

= Choristella ponderi =

Species of gastropod

Choristella ponderi is a species of sea snail, a marine gastropod mollusk in the family Choristellidae.

== Distribution ==
This marine species occurs off New South Wales, Australia.
