= Lepetella barrajoni =

Scientific classification
- Kingdom: Animalia
- Phylum: Mollusca
- Class: Gastropoda
- Subclass: Vetigastropoda
- Order: Lepetellida
- Family: Lepetellidae
- Genus: Lepetella
- Species: L. barrajoni

Binomial name
- Lepetella barrajoni Dantart & Luque, 1994

Species of gastropod

Lepetella barrajoni is a species of sea snail, a marine gastropod mollusk in the family Lepetellidae.

== Distribution ==
This marine species occurs off Spain and Portugal.
