= Boggia =

Boggia is an Italian surname. Notable people with the surname include:

- Antonio Boggia (1799–1862), Italian serial killer
- Jim Boggia, American singer-songwriter

== See also ==
- Bogia (disambiguation)
