= Tecticrater compressa =

Scientific classification
- Kingdom: Animalia
- Phylum: Mollusca
- Class: Gastropoda
- Subclass: Vetigastropoda
- Order: Lepetellida
- Family: Lepetellidae
- Genus: Tecticrater
- Species: T. compressa

Binomial name
- Tecticrater compressa (Suter, 1908)

Synonyms
- Cocculina compressa Suter, 1908

Species of gastropod

Tecticrater compressa is a species of very small deepwater limpet, a marine gastropod mollusc in the family Lepetellidae.

== Distribution ==
This marine species is endemic to New Zealand.
