= Lepetella sierrai =

Scientific classification
- Kingdom: Animalia
- Phylum: Mollusca
- Class: Gastropoda
- Subclass: Vetigastropoda
- Order: Lepetellida
- Family: Lepetellidae
- Genus: Lepetella
- Species: L. sierrai

Binomial name
- Lepetella sierrai Dantart & Luque, 1994

Species of gastropod

Lepetella sierrai is a species of sea snail, a marine gastropod mollusk in the family Lepetellidae.

This species is the host of the ectoparasitic copepod Lepetellicola brescianii Huys, Lopez Gonzalez, Roldan & Luque, 2002

== Description ==
The shell grows to a size of 2.5 mm.

== Distribution ==
This marine species occurs from the Bay of Biscay to Madeira.
