= Lepetella laterocompressa =

Species of gastropod

== Taxonomy ==
Lepetella laterocompressa was originally described as Patella laterocompressa by de Rayneval and Ponzi in 1854. In a 1972 taxonomic revision, malacologist Anders Warén examined the species' external morphology and radula and concluded that it should be placed in the genus Lepetella. The revision also treated Cocculina clipeus Thiele, 1925 as a synonym of Lepetella laterocompressa.

Lepetella laterocompressa

Scientific classification
- Kingdom: Animalia
- Phylum: Mollusca
- Class: Gastropoda
- Subclass: Vetigastropoda
- Order: Lepetellida
- Family: Lepetellidae
- Genus: Lepetella
- Species: L. laterocompressa

Binomial name
- Lepetella laterocompressa (de Rayneval & Ponzi, 1854)

Synonyms
- Cocculina clipeus Thiele 1925; Patella laterocompressa de Rayneval & Ponzi 1854 (basionym); Propilidium aquitanense Locard 1886

Lepetella laterocompressa is a species of sea snail, a marine gastropod mollusk in the family Lepetellidae.

== Description ==
The shell grows to a size of 2 mm.

== Distribution ==
This species occurs in the Atlantic Ocean from Norway to the Azores; in the Mediterranean Sea.
