= Choristella hickmanae =

Scientific classification
- Kingdom: Animalia
- Phylum: Mollusca
- Class: Gastropoda
- Subclass: Vetigastropoda
- Family: Choristellidae
- Genus: Choristella
- Species: C. hickmanae

Binomial name
- Choristella hickmanae McLean, 1992

Species of sea snail

Choristella hickmanae is a species of sea snail, a marine gastropod mollusk in the family Choristellidae.

== Description ==
Shell large for genus (maximum diameter 9 mm), spire height relatively low (height-width ratio of holotype 0.72). Shell wall extremely thin, maximum thickness of broken lip 0.1 mm. Surface dull, yellowish white, periostracum not evident, surface finely pitted. Protoconch and earliest teleoconch whorl missing. Remaining whorls 3.5, rounded, smooth; suture deeply impressed. Umbilicus broad, deep, not obstructed by reflection of inner lip. Spiral sculpture represented only by single narrow ridge deep within umbilicus; axial sculpture lacking, growth increments not apparent. Peristome complete, area of contact with previous whorl minimal. Operculum pale brown, nucleus slightly excentric, final three whorls evenly expanding in multispiral pattern. Height 6.5 mm, width 9 mm.

== Distribution ==
This marine species occurs in the Cascadia Abyssal Plain off Oregon, USA
