= Bogia =

Bogia may refer to:

- Bogia (gastropod), a genus of sea snails
- Bogia District, in Papua New Guinea
- Bogia languages, a group of Papuan languages
- Bogia (crater), a crater on Mars
- An old spelling of Béjaïa, city in Algeria

== See also ==
- Boggia, an Italian surname
- Bogya, a village in Slovakia
- Bojia (disambiguation)
