= Lepetella clypidellaeformis =

Scientific classification
- Kingdom: Animalia
- Phylum: Mollusca
- Class: Gastropoda
- Subclass: Vetigastropoda
- Order: Lepetellida
- Family: Lepetellidae
- Genus: Lepetella
- Species: L. clypidellaeformis

Binomial name
- Lepetella clypidellaeformis (Suter, 1908)

Synonyms
- Cocculina clypidellaeformis Suter, 1908; Tectisumen clypidellaeformis (Suter, 1908)

Species of gastropod

Lepetella clypidellaeformis is a species of small deepwater limpet, a marine gastropod mollusc in the family Lepetellidae. It is endemic to New Zealand.
