= Lepetella postapicula =

Scientific classification
- Kingdom: Animalia
- Phylum: Mollusca
- Class: Gastropoda
- Subclass: Vetigastropoda
- Order: Lepetellida
- Family: Lepetellidae
- Genus: Lepetella
- Species: L. postapicula

Binomial name
- Lepetella postapicula Dell, 1990

Species of gastropod

Lepetella postapicula is a species of sea snail, a marine gastropod mollusk in the family Lepetellidae.

== Distribution ==
This marine species occurs in the Ross Sea, Antarctica, at a depth of 1890 m.
