= Lepetella tubicola =

Scientific classification
- Kingdom: Animalia
- Phylum: Mollusca
- Class: Gastropoda
- Subclass: Vetigastropoda
- Order: Lepetellida
- Family: Lepetellidae
- Genus: Lepetella
- Species: L. tubicola

Binomial name
- Lepetella tubicola Verrill & Smith, 1880

Species of gastropod

Lepetella tubicola is a species of sea snail, a marine gastropod mollusk in the family Lepetellidae.

== Distribution ==
This species occurs in the Northwest Atlantic Ocean and in the Gulf of Mexico, off Louisiana.

== Description ==
The maximum recorded shell length is 3.75 mm. The thin, white shell has a conical shape. The apex is acute and nearly central. The broad aperture is elliptical, oblong or subcircular. It is usually more or less warped, owing to its habitat. The edge is thin and simple. There is no sculpture. The growth lines are slight. The outer surface is dull white. The inner surface is smooth with the pallial markings faint.

== Habitat ==
Minimum recorded depth is 238 m. Maximum recorded depth is 710 m.
