= Limner (disambiguation) =

A limner is an illuminator of manuscripts, or more broadly, a graphic artist, especially a portrait painter or an illustrator.

Limner may also refer to:

- Lynda Limner
- Henry Limner (14th century), MP for Norwich, England
- Richard William Murray (1819-1908), English and Cape Colony journalist who used "Limner" as his pen-name

== See also ==
- Limneria, a genus of small sea snails
- Painter and Limner, a member of the Royal Household in Scotland
