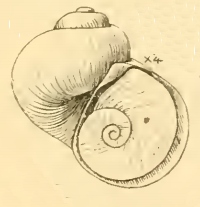
- Drawing of a shell of Choristella tenera

Scientific classification
- Kingdom: Animalia
- Phylum: Mollusca
- Class: Gastropoda
- Subclass: Vetigastropoda
- Family: Choristellidae
- Genus: Choristella
- Species: C. tenera

Binomial name
- Choristella tenera (A. E. Verrill, 1882)

Synonyms
- Choristes elegans var. tenera Verrill, 1882

= Choristella tenera =

Species of gastropod

Choristella tenera is a species of sea snail, a marine gastropod mollusk in the family Choristellidae.

== Distribution ==
This marine species occurs in the Atlantic Ocean off New Jersey and North Carolina, USA.

== Description ==
The maximum recorded shell length is 10.5 mm. The thin shell is fragile and has a smooth surface. It has a heliciform shape, with a low spire and a very large, ventricose body whorl. The shell contains four to five, very convex and evenly rounded whorls. The apical whorl is small, spiral, obliquely upturned and incurved, but not prominent. The suture is deeply impressed. The whorls are largely in contact and united well together, though the periostraca is continuous between them. The large aperture forms more than a half-circle. The outer side of the aperture is well rounded, the columella margin nearly straight. The sharp lip is continuous all around, raised up and with the edge slightly everted in the umbilical region, so as to partially conceal the umbilicus, which is rather large and deep, nearly circular within. The thin operculum is horny, pale yellow, round-ovate, spiral, with two to three rapidly enlarging whorls, the nucleus excentric.

The head of the animal is large, short, thick, rounded or truncate. It has two short, flat, obtuse, anterior tentacles, wide apart, but connected together by a transverse fold. The posterior tentacles are short, thick, conical, smooth. There are no eyes visible. The proboscis is short, thick, and retractile. The crescent-shaped, black jaws are strong. The verge is situated just below the right posterior tentacle. It is small, papilliform, and swollen at base. Below this and farther back, there is a larger and thicker papilla with basal swelling. On each side, between the mantle and foot, at about mid length of the foot, there is a small mammiform papilla. There are also two small flat cirri, behind and beneath the operculum. The foot is broad, ovate, with two tentacle-like processes in front. The gill is large, consisting of numerous thin lamellae, attached to the inner surface of the mantle, over the left side of the neck, and extending obliquely across and over the neck to the right side.

== Habitat ==
Minimum recorded depth is 353 m. Maximum recorded depth is 1481 m.
