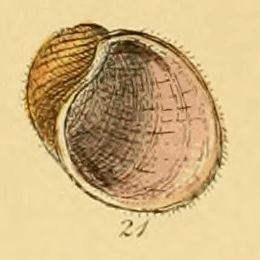
- Velutina velutina shell

Scientific classification
- Kingdom: Animalia
- Phylum: Mollusca
- Class: Gastropoda
- Subclass: Caenogastropoda
- Order: Littorinimorpha
- Family: Velutinidae
- Genus: Velutina; Fleming, 1820

Type species
- Velutina vulgaris Fleming, 1820

Synonyms
- Velutella Gray, 1847

= Velutina =

Genus of gastropods

Velutina is a genus of small sea snails, marine gastropod mollusks in the family Velutinidae.

== Species ==
Species within the genus Velutina include:

- Velutina coriacea (Pallas, 1788)
- Velutina cryptospira Middendorff, 1848
- Velutina plicatilis (Müller, 1776)
- Velutina pulchella Derjugin, 1950
- Velutina schneideri Friele, 1886
- Velutina tarasovi Derjugin, 1950
- Velutina velutina (Müller, 1776)

Species brought into synonymy

- Velutina beringensis Derjugin, 1950 : synonym of Cartilagovelutina beringensis (Derjugin, 1950)
- Velutina bifasciata Derjugin, 1950 : synonym of Limneria undata (T. Brown, 1839)
- Velutina canaliculata Kröyer, 1847 : synonym of Limneria undata (T. Brown, 1839)
- Velutina capillata Derjugin, 1950 : synonym of Ciliatovelutina capillata (Derjugin, 1950)
- Velutina capuloidea Blainville, 1824 : synonym of Velutina velutina (O. F. Müller, 1776)
- Velutina chondrina Bartsch in Derjugin, 1950 : synonym of Cartilagovelutina chondrina (Bartsch in Derjugin, 1950)
- Velutina conica Dall, 1886 : synonym of Velutina prolongata Carpenter, 1864
- Velutina cristata Derjugin, 1950 : synonym of Cartilagovelutina cristata (Derjugin, 1950)
- Velutina derjugini Bartsch in Derjugin, 1950 : synonym of Velutina prolongata Carpenter, 1864
- Velutina flexilis (Montagu, 1808) : synonym of Velutina plicatilis (O. F. Müller, 1776)
- Velutina fraudatrix Golikov & Kussakin, 1962 : synonym of Velutina tarasovi Derjugin, 1950
- Velutina glabrata Golikov & Kussakin, 1962 : synonym of Velutina coriacea (Pallas, 1788)
- Velutina haliotidea (Fabricius, 1780) : synonym of Velutina velutina (O. F. Müller, 1776)
- Velutina insculpta Odhner, 1913 Limneria insculpta (Odhner, 1913)
- Velutina laevigata "(O. F. Müller, 1777)": synonym of Velutina velutina (O. F. Müller, 1776)
- Velutina lanata Derjugin, 1950 : synonym of Ciliatovelutina lanata (Derjugin, 1950)
- Velutina lanigera Møller, 1842: synonym of Ciliatovelutina lanigera (Møller, 1842)
- Velutina litoralis Golikov & Kussakin, in Golikov & Scarlato, 1967 : synonym of Velutina coriacea (Pallas, 1788)
- Velutina nana Derjugin, 1950 : synonym of Ciliatovelutina nana (Derjugin, 1950)
- Velutina ochotensis Derjugin, 1950 : synonym of Limneria undata (T. Brown, 1839)
- Velutina pellucida Derjugin, 1950 : synonym of Velutina coriacea (Pallas, 1788)
- Velutina prolongata Carpenter, 1864 : synonym of Limneria prolongata (Carpenter, 1864)
- Velutina rupicola Conrad, 1831 : synonym of Velutina velutina (O. F. Müller, 1776)
- Velutina schantarica Derjugin, 1950 : synonym of Velutina cryptospira Middendorff, 1848
- Velutina sitkensis A. Adams, 1853 : synonym of Velutina plicatilis (O. F. Müller, 1776)
- Velutina striata Macgillivray, 1843 : synonym of Velutina velutina (O. F. Müller, 1776)
- Velutina undata Smith J., 1839: synonym of Limneria undata (T. Brown, 1839)
- Velutina ventricosa Golikov, in Golikov & Scarlato, 1985 : synonym of Velutina coriacea (Pallas, 1788)
- Velutina vulgaris Fleming, 1820 : synonym of Velutina velutina (O. F. Müller, 1776)
- Velutina zonata Gould, 1841 : synonym of Limneria undata (T. Brown, 1839)

== Description ==
The shell is thin, mostly external, calcareous, auriform, paucispiral and invested by a velvety epidermis. The spire is lateral and diminutive. The suture is well impressed. The aperture is very large and rounded with the thin, almost continuous lip. The columellar lip is a little reflected. There is no operculum or umbilicus.

The oval animal is convex above and little spiral. It has a large oblong foot. The margin of the mantle is developed and more or less reflected over the edge of the shell. The head is broad and depressed. The two large tentacles are subulate, blunt, far apart, with eyes sessile on prominences at their outer bases. The mouth has a short tube.

The formula of the radula is 2·1·1·1·2. The central tooth is subquadrangular, multicuspid; the central cusps are very long and sharp; lateral teeth are multicuspid, marginals are narrow, with a few obsolete denticles on the margin.

Species in the genus Velutina resemble the pulmonate genus Otina, but Velutina are strictly marine. Sometimes they are found out at sea, but usually live among stones near low tide.
