= Cypricardinia =

Cypricardinia Temporal range: Early Ordovician-Late Permian ~485.4–254 Ma

Scientific classification
- Kingdom: Animalia
- Phylum: Mollusca
- Class: Bivalvia
- Order: Carditida
- Family: †Cardiniidae
- Genus: †Cypricardinia; Hall 1860

Species
- C. borealica Muromtseva, 1984; C. contracta Girty, 1909; C. dalecarlica Isberg, 1934; C. elegans Clarke & Swartz, 1913; C. elegans var. angusta Clarke & Swartz, 1913; C. eopermica Biakov, 2005; C. fayettevillensis Girty, 1910; C. fossa Campbell and Engel, 1963; C. kallholniensis Isberg, 1934; C. permica Licharew, 1931; C. securigera Talent, 1963

Extinct genus of bivalves

Cypricardinia is an extinct genus of bivalves. Species are found worldwide.
