= Tecticrater =

Scientific classification
- Kingdom: Animalia
- Phylum: Mollusca
- Class: Gastropoda
- Subclass: Vetigastropoda
- Order: Lepetellida
- Family: Lepetellidae
- Subfamily: Lepetellinae
- Genus: Tecticrater; Dell, 1956

Type species
- Tecticrater compressa Suter, H., 1908

Species
- See text

Genus of gastropods

Tecticrater is a genus of very small deepwater limpets, marine gastropod molluscs in the family Lepetellidae.

== Species ==
Species in the genus Tecticrater include:

- Tecticrater cervae (Fleming, 1948)
- Tecticrater compressa (Suter, 1908)
- Tecticrater finlayi (Powell, 1937)
- Tecticrater grandis Crozier, 1966
- Tecticrater subcompressa (Powell, 1937)
