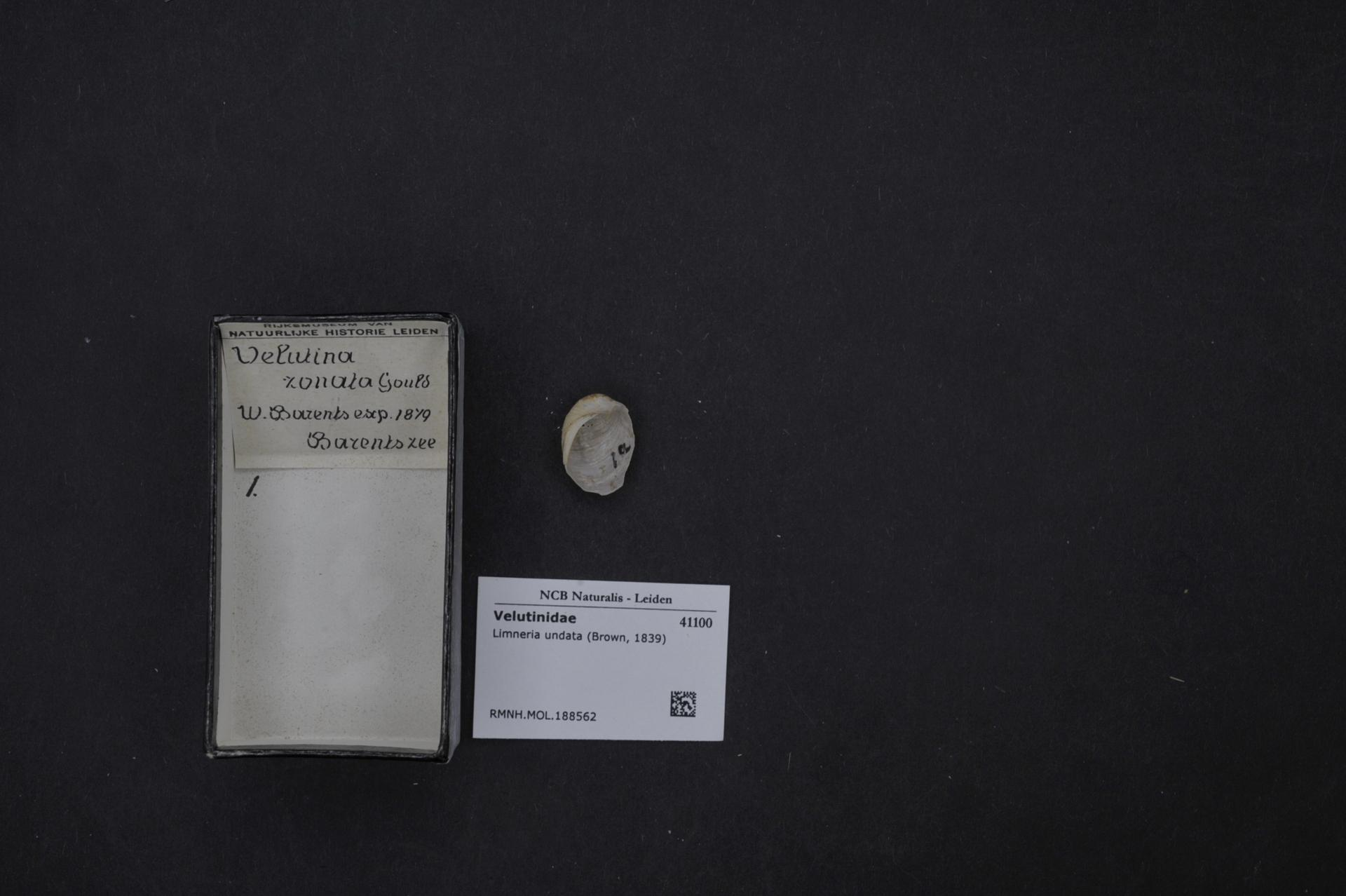

Scientific classification
- Kingdom: Animalia
- Phylum: Mollusca
- Class: Gastropoda
- Subclass: Caenogastropoda
- Order: Littorinimorpha
- Family: Velutinidae
- Genus: Limneria
- Species: L. undata

Binomial name
- Limneria undata (T. Brown, 1839)

Synonyms
- Limneria undata bifasciata (Derjugin, 1950); Limneria undata ochotensis (Derjugin, 1950); Limneria undata undata (T. Brown, 1839); Velutina bifasciata Derjugin, 1950; Velutina canaliculata Kröyer, 1847; Velutina ochotensis Derjugin, 1950; Velutina undata T. Brown, 1839; Velutina zonata Gould, 1841; Velutina zonata var. grandis E. A. Smith, 1877

= Limneria undata =

Species of gastropod

Limneria undata is a species of small sea snail, a marine gastropod mollusk in the family Velutinidae.

== Distribution ==
Distribution of Limneria undata include:

- European waters
- USA: Cobscook Bay
- Clam Cove
- Frost Cove 44.993197, -67.063513]{}
- L'Etang

== Description ==
The maximum recorded shell length is 27 mm.

== Habitat ==
Minimum recorded depth is 0 m. Maximum recorded depth is 1127 m.
