= Limneria =

Scientific classification
- Kingdom: Animalia
- Phylum: Mollusca
- Class: Gastropoda
- Subclass: Caenogastropoda
- Order: Littorinimorpha
- Family: Velutinidae
- Genus: Limneria; H. Adams & A. Adams, 1851

Genus of gastropods

Limneria is a genus of small sea snails, marine gastropod mollusks in the family Velutinidae.

== Species ==
Species within the genus Limneria include:

- Limneria insculpta Odhner, 1913
- Limneria prolongata (Carpenter, 1864)
- Limneria undata (T. Brown, 1839)
