= Star One =

Star One, Star 1, and variants may refer to:

- Star One (band), a Dutch music group
- Star One (satellite operator), a Brazilian satellite company
- Star One (TV channel), a former Hindi-language TV channel
- "Star One", an episode of Blake's 7

== See also ==
- "STARI" (Southern tick-associated rash illness)
- One star (disambiguation)
- Istar (disambiguation)
- Star TV (disambiguation)
