= Digitaria (bivalve) =

Scientific classification
- Kingdom: Animalia
- Phylum: Mollusca
- Class: Bivalvia
- Order: Carditida
- Family: Astartidae
- Genus: Digitaria; S. V. Wood, 1853

Type species
- Digitaria digitaria (Linnaeus, 1758)

Synonyms
- Astarte (Digitaria) S.V. Wood, 1853; Woodia Deshayes, 1858

Genus of bivalves

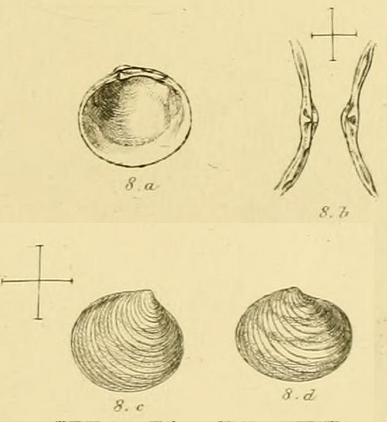

Digitaria is a genus of bivalve mollusc in the Astartidae family. It was circumscribed by S.V Wood in 1853. As of 2024, WoRMS recognizes 2 species in this genus.

Species include:

- Digitaria agulhasensi (Jaeckel & Thiele, 1931)
- Digitaria digitaria (Linnaeus, 1758)

Its species can be found in the waters of Europe and Africa.
