= Istar =

Istar, iSTAR, or variants, may refer to:

- Intelligence, surveillance, target acquisition, and reconnaissance
- Ištar or Ishtar, the Assyrian and Babylonian goddess of fertility, war, love, and sex
- Istar (Dragonlance), a fictional city in the Dungeons & Dragons game
- i*, a software modeling language
- Istari, the wizards in J. R. R. Tolkien's fictional world
- Hubei Istar F.C., a Chinese football club

== See also ==
- Ishtar (disambiguation)
- Star One (disambiguation)
- One star (disambiguation)
- Ister (disambiguation)
