= One star =

One star may refer to:

- One-star rank, a senior military rank
- Star (classification), a grading of, for example, a hotel, restaurant, movie, TV show or theatre or musical work or performance
- One Star (record label), producers of Haciendo El Amor Con La Ropa
- One Star Hotel, a Philadelphia-based rock band
- Baire one star function, in mathematical real analysis

== See also ==
- Lone Star (disambiguation)
- OnStar
- STAR 1 (disambiguation)
- Istar (disambiguation)
- For other numbers of stars, see Category:Star ranking systems
