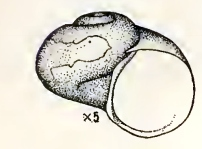
- Drawing of a shell of Choristella leptalea

Scientific classification
- Kingdom: Animalia
- Phylum: Mollusca
- Class: Gastropoda
- Subclass: Vetigastropoda
- Family: Choristellidae
- Genus: Choristella; Bush, 1897

Type species
- Choristella leptalea Bush, 1897

= Choristella =

Genus of gastropods

Choristella is a genus of sea snails, marine gastropod mollusks in the family Choristellidae.

== Description ==
(Original description by Bush) This genus is proposed for species of small shells of few convex whorls forming a flattened, little elevated spire with a minute, scarcely raised, nuclear whorl and a large body whorl. The suture is very deep, and somewhat channeled. The umbilicus is small, round, deep, showing some of the whorls with rounded walls. The oblique aperture is nearly circular. The peristome is simple, continuous, slightly attached to the body whorl, and reflected over the umbilicus. The operculum of the type species is thin, roundly ovate. it has a delicate horn color, of few abruptly enlarging whorls indistinctly defined by a spiral thread and showing sinuous transverse lines of growth. The nucleus is slightly excentric.

The animal has a broad emarginate head with one pair of long slender tentacles. It has a rather broad, short, tapered, ciliated verge just beneath the base of the right one. There are no eyes. The gill is attached to the left side lying across the top of the body just within the mantle edge. The jaw plates are thin, delicate horn-color with a broad band of very dark brown along the strongly serrate, cutting edges.

The inner surface is strongly reticulated, as in species of Velutina. The form of these plates is quite irregular. The cutting edge is oblique, forming an angle of about 135° with the inner or middle, straight edge. The distal outline is very strongly sinuously curved, forming a wide, shallow upper portion and a much narrower basal portion.

The radula consists of numerous rows of delicate colored, rather stout, non-serrate teeth, each row having a series of thirteen: —a very small central or median tooth with rather long, strongly curved tip, placed a little above and alternating somewhat with the rest of the series. On either side, one broad strongly hooked lateral, and a much broader second lateral one with correspondingly broad, more pointed hook. Beyond, three, about equal, much narrower, somewhat sickle-shaped, marginal ones with a small triangular, scarcely perceptible, platelike one on the outer edge.

The form of the shell and operculum strongly resemble a Choristes elegans var. tenera Verrill of medium size, but the radula shows marked and interesting differences. In that species, or rather variety, there are but eleven teeth in each series, the second or outer lateral tooth having a double or bilobed tip (these.

== Species ==
Species within the genus Choristella include:

- Choristella hickmanae McLean, 1992
- Choristella leptalea Bush, 1897
- Choristella marshalli McLean, 1992
- Choristella nofronii McLean, 1992
- Choristella ponderi McLean, 1992
- Choristella tenera (A. E. Verrill, 1882)
- Choristella vitrea (Kuroda & Habe, 1971)

Species brought into synonymy

- Choristella agulhasae (A. H. Clarke, 1961): synonym of Trenchia agulhasae (Clarke, 1961) (superseded combination)
- Choristella brychia Bush, 1897: synonym of Choristella leptalea Bush, 1897
