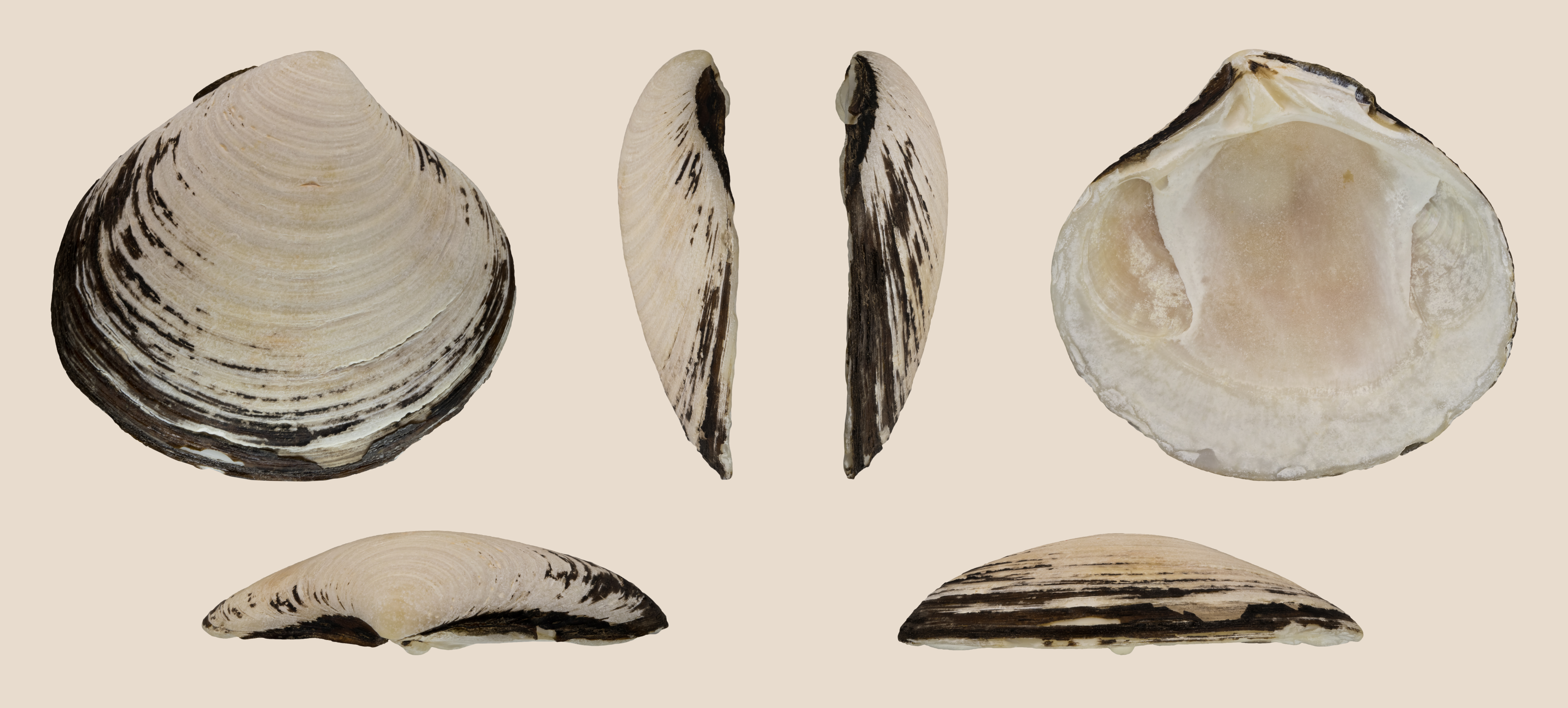

Scientific classification
- Kingdom: Animalia
- Phylum: Mollusca
- Class: Bivalvia
- Order: Carditida
- Superfamily: Crassatelloidea
- Family: Astartidae
- Genus: Astarte
- Species: A. borealis

Binomial name
- Astarte borealis (Schumacher, 1817)

Synonyms
- Tridonta borealis Schumacher, 1817

= Astarte borealis =

Species of bivalve mollusc

Astarte borealis or Tridonta borealis, the boreal astarte, is a species of bivalve mollusc in the family Astartidae. It can be found in the Arctic Ocean and in the northern Pacific and Atlantic Oceans.

== Distribution ==
A. borealis are found in the boreal areas of Arctic, Pacific, and Atlantic Oceans. Currently studies have collected samples from the Baltic Sea, White Sea of Russia and Northern Alaska. Populations are widespread and found in the Pacific Ocean from the Sea of Okhotsk to the Aleutian Islands, in the Arctic waters of Russia from the Barents Sea to the Chukchi Sea, and in the Atlantic Ocean from Newfoundland to Greenland and Iceland, and in Europe in both the North and Baltic Seas. A. borealis is essentially a shallow water species (0–300m). Due to low salinities A. borealis submerges the brackish waters and lives in deeper regions with higher salinity. The optimal salinity range lies between 14 and 30 psu. It can survive in salinities between 10 and 15 psu with its minimum tolerance at 6–8 psu.

== Morphology ==
The exterior characteristics of genus Astarte include the periostracum, ribs and overall shell shape. The genus has a shell outline that is primarily trigonal with variations that are elliptical, ovate or subquadrate. The genus is equivalve and the length is equal to or greater than the height. The sculpture of the genus consists of commarginal ribs, most of which are equally spaced and vary from fine to broad-sized ribs; A. esquimalti has irregular, wavy ribs. The umbones are mostly broad and inflated; a few species have pointed umbones that are generally just dorsal of the midline. The umbones are prone to erosion in older specimens, which causes a difference in the appearance between juvenile and adult individuals. The periostracum is thick to this and varies from shiny to silky to dull across the genus. It is generally a yellow to black to reddish-brown and adherent.

The shell shape of Astarte borealis is ovate to subquadrate to sub trigonal with umbones subcentral, just dorsal of midline, and often eroded in older individuals. The sculpture consists of fine, commarginal ribs or striae, and may possibly have raised ribs around the first 6–8 mm of the umbones. The periostracum is fibrous and adherent, thick, and yellow to black. Astarte borealis has a strong hinge as well as strong ligament attached to two prominent nymphs. The left valve has three teeth, two are larger cardinal teeth and the third is very small and inconspicuous. The right valve has right valve has two teeth, the anterior much larger and broader than the posterior tooth. The adductor muscle scar is deeply impressed, and the anterior pedal retractor scar is prominent. No pallial sinus and the pallial line is narrow and sometimes faint. The interior margin is smooth and unregulated in most, in a very few they may be some very light crenulations present. Almost always, the lack of crenulations will differentiate A. borealis form another Astarte species.

In terms of abundance and biomass, A. arctica and A. borealis have the highest values and are visually fairly similar in the color spectrum of the periostracum, irrespective of their size and age variability. The shell of these species is rather thick and heavy, tissue weight accounts for only 11–16% of total weight, which generally corresponds to values reported for A. arctica and A. borealis in other parts of their geographical ranges. Thus, the tissue weight of A. borealis from the Baltic Sea is on an average 14.5% of the total weight, i.e., the shell is fairly massive and solid. This reflects the adaptation of these mollusks for life on hard gravelly pebbly bottoms and, unlike many other epi- and infaunal organisms having a thin shell, helps them survive under the mechanical action of the bottom substrate, as well as trawls, dredges, etc. in conditions of active demersal fishery.

Rounded shape:

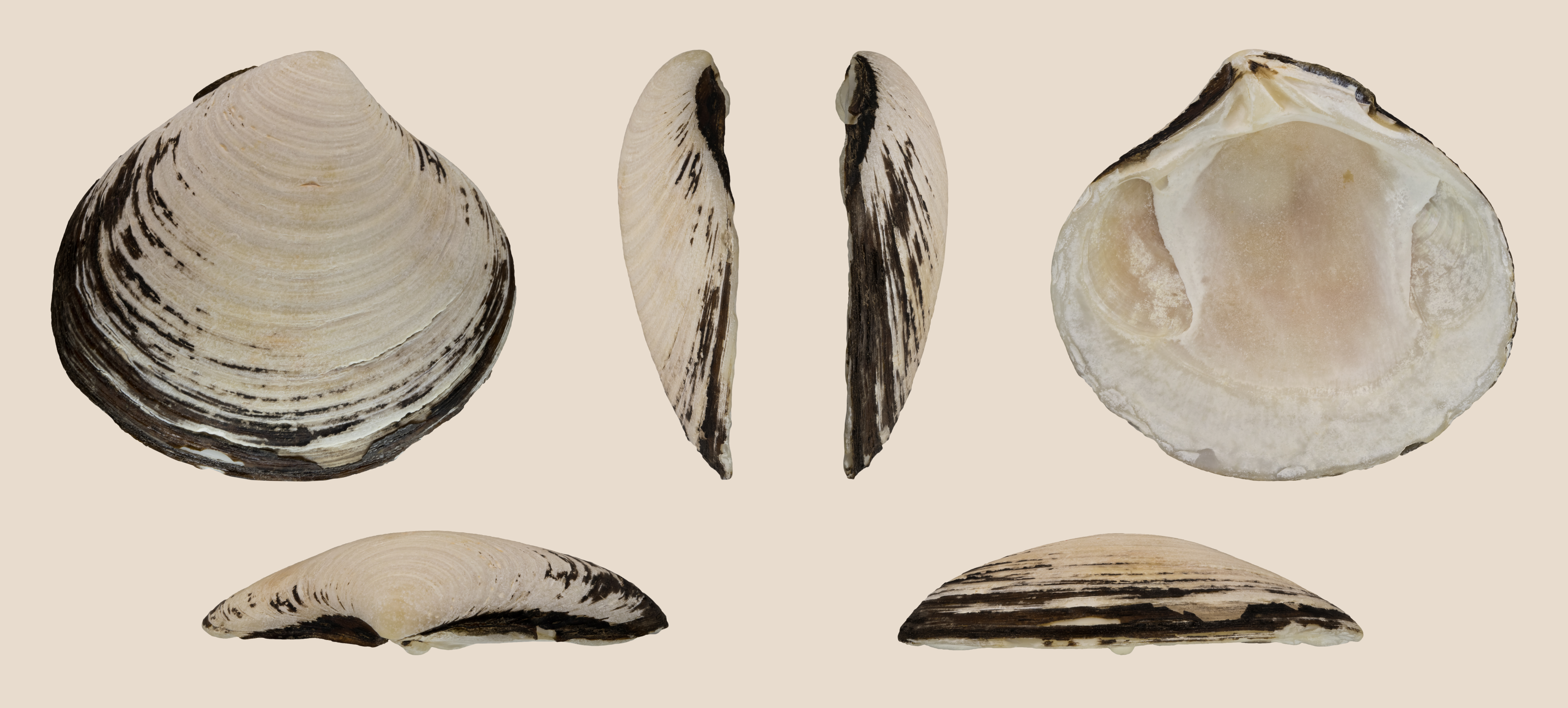
Right valve

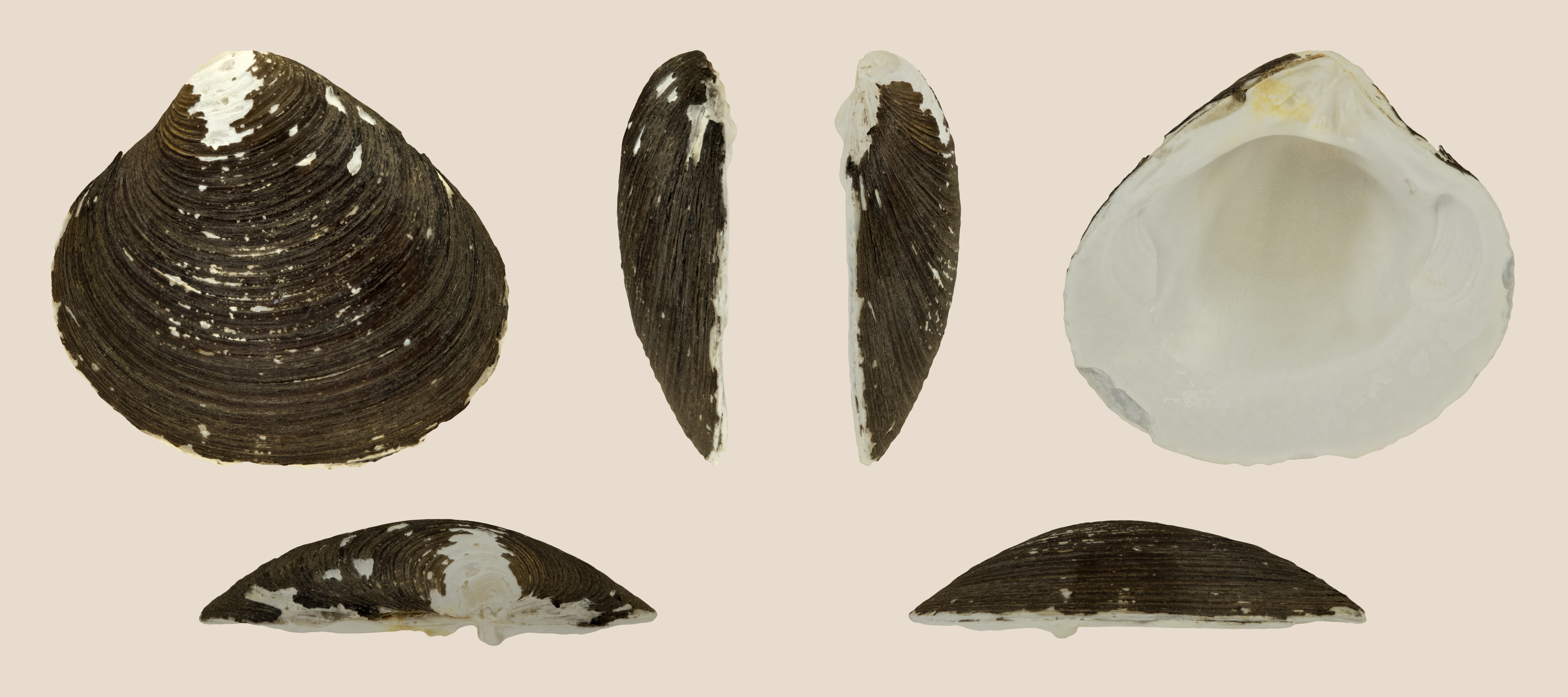
Left valve

Elongated shape:

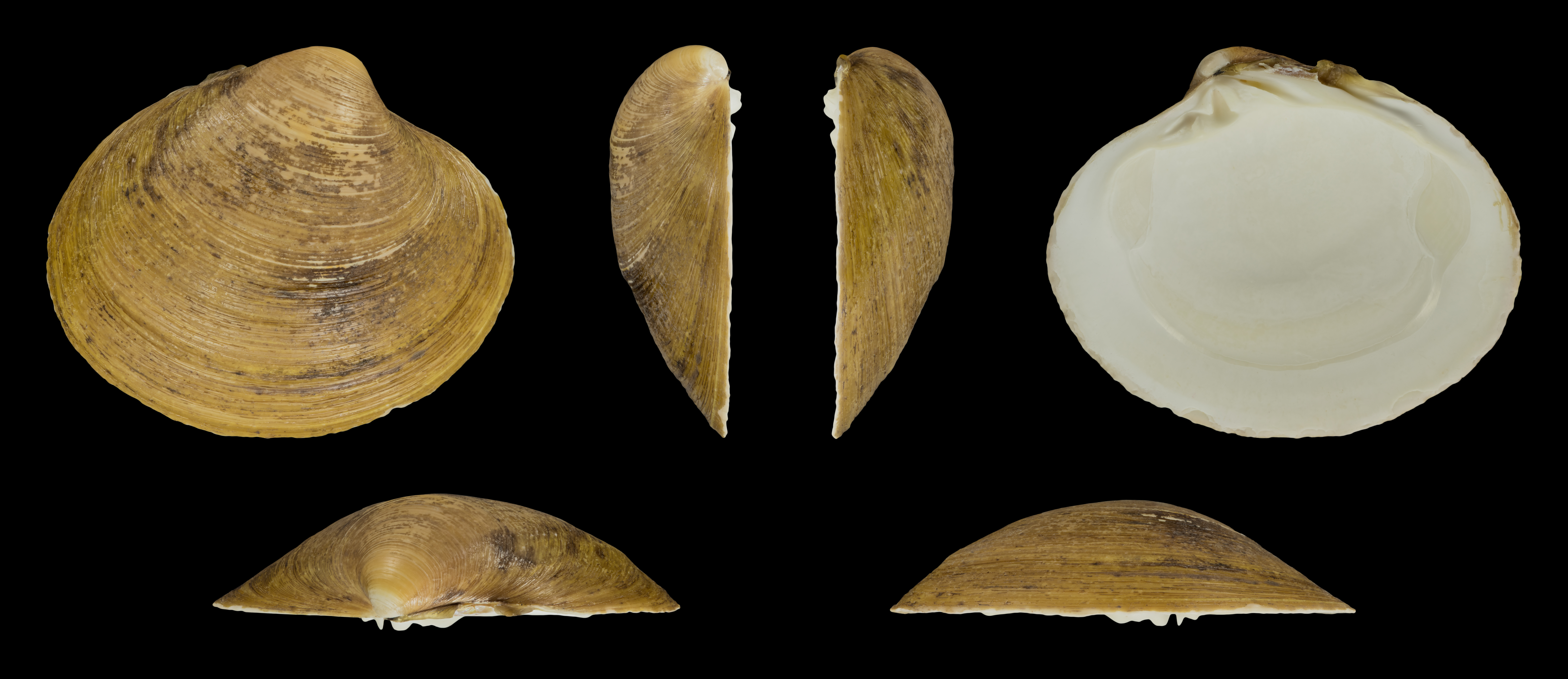
Right valve

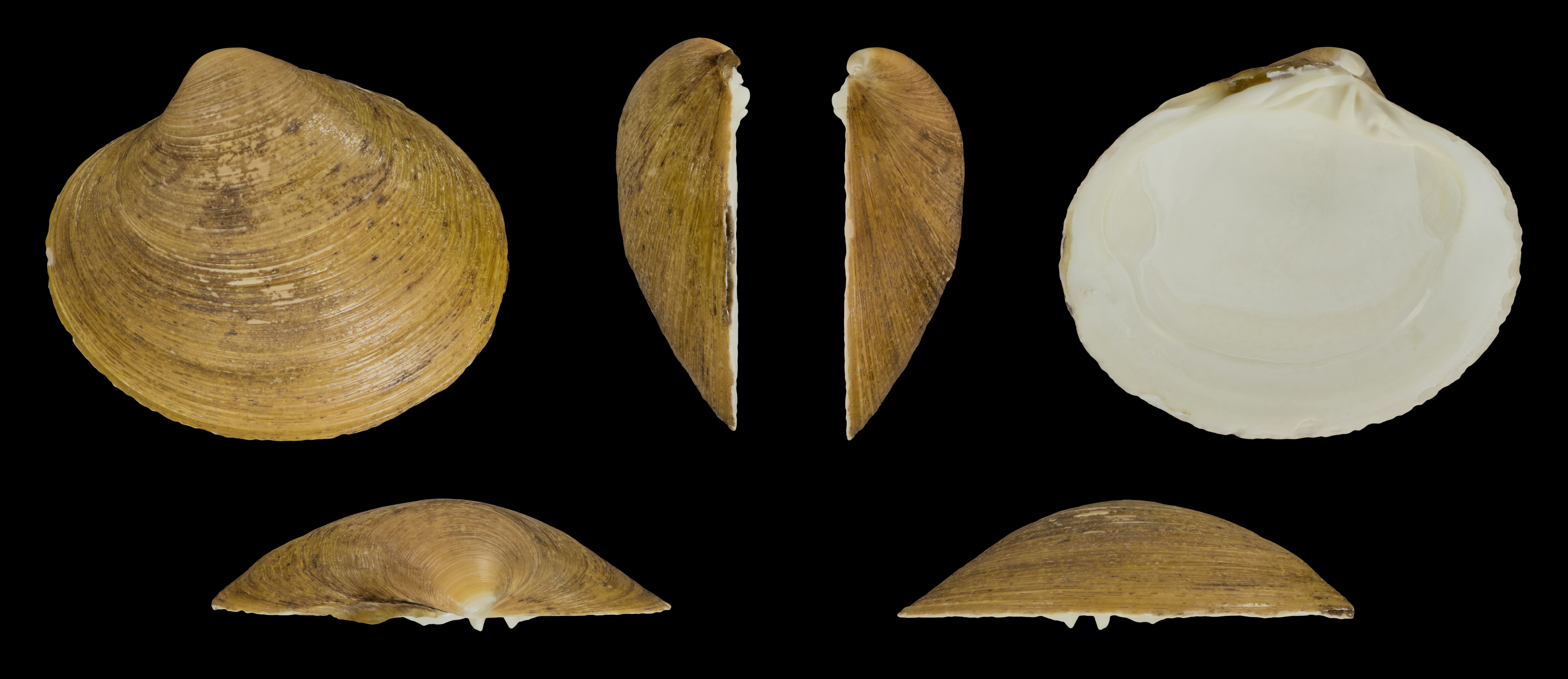
Left valve

== Life cycle ==
Like other astartids, A. borealis has large (150–200 μm) yolk-rich eggs with a sticky outer envelope causing populations to settle in clusters. The timing of spawning varies by region. In Greenland and the North Atlantic Ocean, spawning occurs from October to December. In the Baltic Sea, individuals possess ripe eggs and sperm for almost the entire year and may portion spawn (takes place during several intervals) rather than at a certain period. Most populations of A. borealis are restricted to cold, marine/brackish waters, tolerating a salinity range of 8–35 psu. In the White Sea, A. borealis is more or less evenly distributed throughout the depth range Astarte borealis have been the subject of several studies on anoxia within the Baltic Sea and has been found to be anoxia tolerant, although repeated extended exposures to anoxic conditions will eventually cause mortality. Compared to other areas of origin, the spawning season of A. borealis in the Baltic Sea shows an extremely long period of mature eggs and sperm, with a maximum in winter and spring season.

Modern bivalves generally show an increase in lifespan and a decrease in von Bertalanffy k with latitude, a pattern that holds across Bivalvia and within groups. Patterns within A. borealis appear to be more complex. Though this may be because methods for determining lifespans of A. borealis throughout its range are almost as varied as the reported lifespans themselves. At its northernmost limits, traditional isotope sclerochronology has shown A. borealis to be exceptionally long-lived, reaching 150 years in Greenland and 48 years in the White Sea.

== Ecological role ==
Astarte borealis is an infauna suspension feeder found buried up to 2 mm below the sediment surface preferring muddy sand containing gravel. In the White Sea, their main food source, phytoplankton, begin to bloom during the spring melt in April, but remain relatively low in abundance until the peak bloom in July and August. After ice formation in November, food is in low abundance until spring. Along with other species, these mollusks play an important role in marine ecosystems because they are a common component of benthic communities and a dietary item of many predatory fishes and animals. These mollusks are also important for paleontological and paleobiological research.
