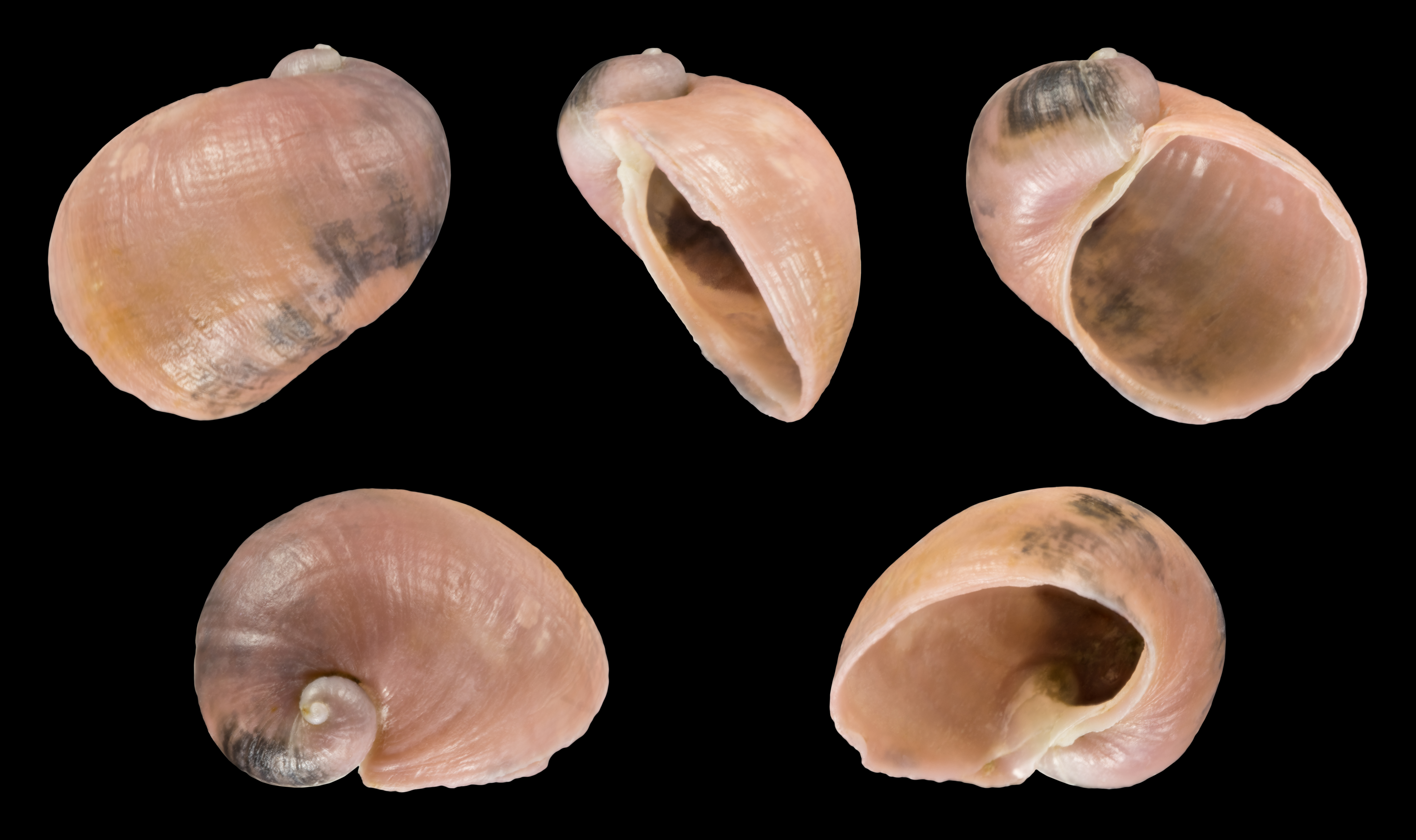
- Velutina velutina shell

Scientific classification
- Kingdom: Animalia
- Phylum: Mollusca
- Class: Gastropoda
- Subclass: Caenogastropoda
- Order: Littorinimorpha
- Family: Velutinidae
- Genus: Velutina
- Species: V. velutina

Binomial name
- Velutina velutina (Müller, 1776)

Synonyms
- Velutina haliotidea (Fabricius, 1780); Velutina laevigata (O. F. Müller, 1777)

= Velutina velutina =

Species of gastropod

Velutina velutina, common name the velvet shell, is a species of small sea snail with a transparent shell, a marine gastropod mollusk in the family Velutinidae.

== Description ==
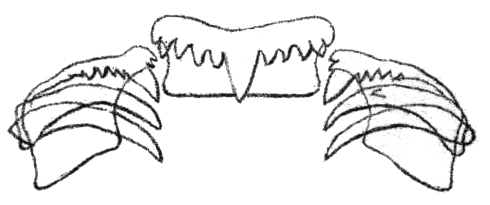
drawing of one row of teeth in the radula of Velutina velutina

The maximum body size is from 15 to 50 mm. The maximum recorded shell length is 27.5 mm.

== Distribution ==
The distribution of Velutina velutina is circumboreal. The range of Velutina velutina include: 72.78°N to 42°N; 70°W to 0°W.

Distribution of Velutina velutina include:

- Greenland: West Greenland.
- Canada: Labrador, Nova Scotia, New Brunswick
- USA: Maine, Massachusetts, including Cobscook Bay

== Ecology ==
The habitat of Velutina velutina include bathyal, infralittoral and circalittoral of the Gulf and estuary. Minimum recorded depth is 0 m. Maximum recorded depth is 183 m.

Velutina velutina feeds on ascidians.

Sexes are separate but are seldom conspicuously different externally. Velutina velutina is a simultaneous hermaphrodite yet self-fertilization is prevented due to various morphological, physiological, or behavioral mechanisms. They shed their eggs.
