= Lepetella =

Scientific classification
- Kingdom: Animalia
- Phylum: Mollusca
- Class: Gastropoda
- Subclass: Vetigastropoda
- Order: Lepetellida
- Family: Lepetellidae
- Subfamily: Lepetellinae
- Genus: Lepetella; Verrill, 1880

Type species
- Lepetella tubicola Verrill & Smith, 1880

Genus of gastropods

Lepetella is a genus of very small deep-sea sea snails or limpets, marine gastropod mollusks in the family Lepetellidae.

== Description ==
The small shell is smooth, oval or oblong, limpet-shaped or conical. It has a simple sub-central apex that isn't spiral. The animal resembles Lepeta Gray, 1847, but has distinct eyes. It has a taenioglossan radula with seven regular rows of teeth.

== Species ==
Species within the genus Lepetella include:

- Lepetella barrajoni Dantart & Luque, 1994
- Lepetella clypidellaeformis (Suter, 1908)
- Lepetella espinosae Dantart & Luque, 1994
- Lepetella ionica F. Nordsieck, 1973
- Lepetella laterocompressa (de Rayneval & Ponzi, 1854)
- † Lepetella parallela (Laws, 1950)
- Lepetella postapicula Dell, 1990
- Lepetella sierrai Dantart & Luque, 1994
- Lepetella tubicola Verrill & Smith, 1880
