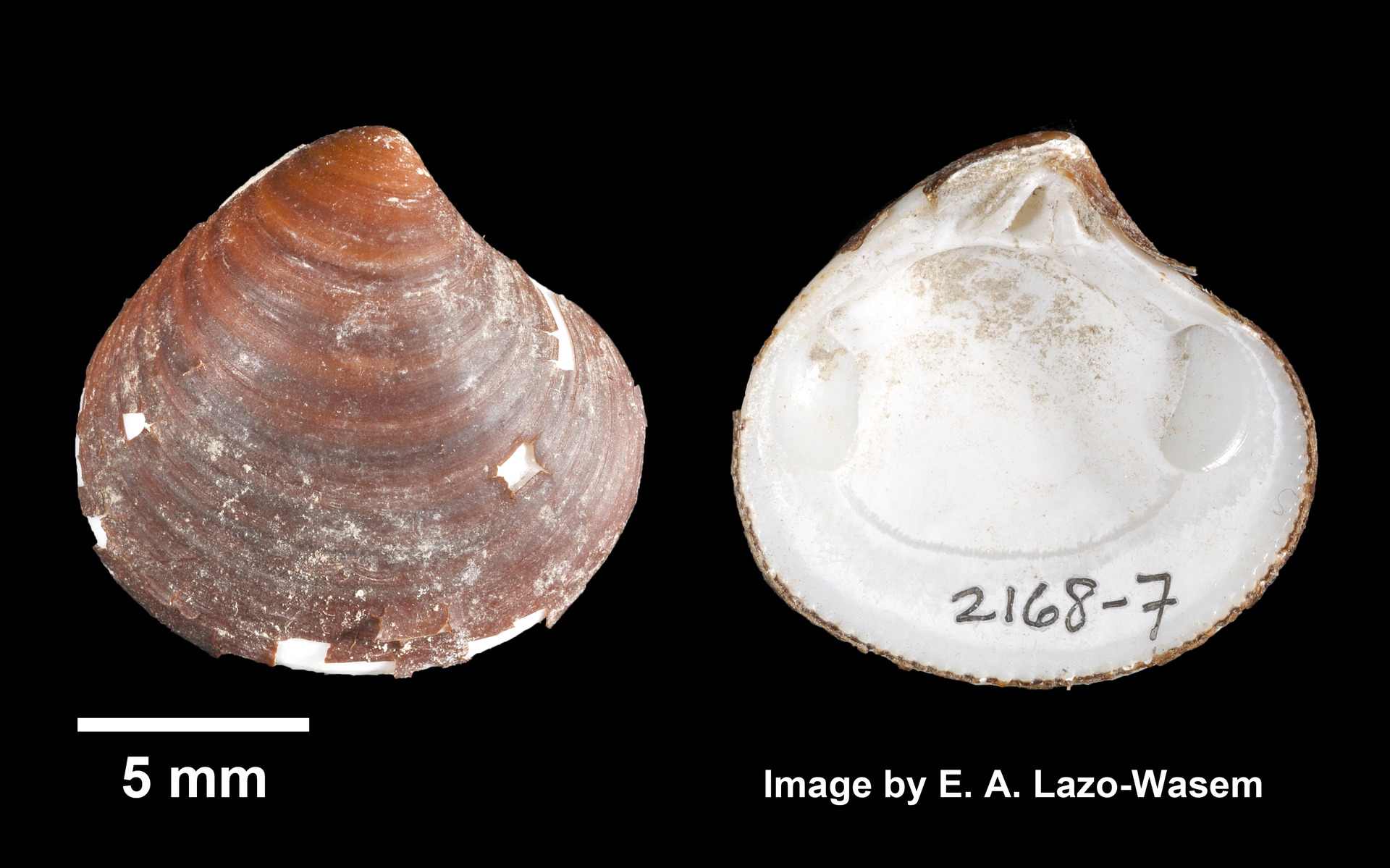

Scientific classification
- Kingdom: Animalia
- Phylum: Mollusca
- Class: Bivalvia
- Order: Carditida
- Superfamily: Crassatelloidea
- Family: Astartidae
- Genus: Astarte
- Species: A. castanea

Binomial name
- Astarte castanea Say, 1822

= Astarte castanea =

Species of bivalve

Astarte castanea, or the chestnut astarte, is a species of bivalve mollusc in the family Astartidae. It can be found along the Atlantic coast of North America, ranging from Nova Scotia to New Jersey.
