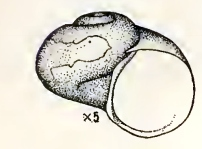
- Drawing of a shell of Choristella leptalea

Scientific classification
- Kingdom: Animalia
- Phylum: Mollusca
- Class: Gastropoda
- Subclass: Vetigastropoda
- Family: Choristellidae
- Genus: Choristella
- Species: C. leptalea

Binomial name
- Choristella leptalea Bush, 1897

Synonyms
- Choristella brychia Bush, 1897

= Choristella leptalea =

Species of gastropod

Choristella leptalea is a species of sea snail, a marine gastropod mollusk in the family Choristellidae.

== Distribution ==
This marine species occurs in the Atlantic Ocean off New Jersey, USA.

== Description ==
The maximum recorded shell length is 4 mm. The dull opaque white shell lacks any sculpture. It has a very delicate texture. The shell is a flattened little elevated spire. It consists of 3½ whorls with a large body whorl. The suture is very deep, somewhat channeled. The small umbilicus is round and deep. The nearly circular aperture is oblique. The simple peritreme is continuous, slightly attached to the body whorl and reflected over the umbilicus. The thin operculum is round-ovate and has a delicate horn color.

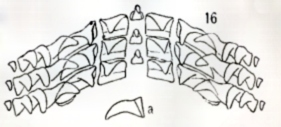
Radula of Choristella leptalea

The radula contains numerous rows of delicate colored, rather stout, non-serrate teeth, with thirteen in each row. The radula shows a very small central or median tooth with rather long, strongly curved tip, placed a little above and alternating somewhat with the rest of the series; on either side, one broad strongly hooked lateral, and a much broader second lateral one with correspondingly broad, more pointed hook; beyond, three, about equal, much narrower, somewhat sickle-shaped, marginal ones with a small triangular, scarcely perceptible, platelike one on the outer edge.

The animal has a broad emarginate head with one pair of long slender tentacles. It has a rather broad, short, tapered, ciliated verge just beneath the base of the right one. There are no eyes. The gill attached to the left side lies across the top of the body just within the mantle edge. The jaw plates are thin. They have a delicate horn-color with a broad band of very dark brown along the strongly serrate, cutting edges. The inner surface is strongly reticulated. The form of these plates is quite irregular: the cutting edge is oblique, forming an angle of about 135° with the inner or middle, straight edge; the distal outline is very strongly sinuously curved, forming a wide, shallow upper portion and a much narrower basal portion.

== Habitat ==
Minimum recorded depth is 713 m. Maximum recorded depth is 1481 m.
