= Ishaara =

Ishaara may refer to:

- Ishaara (1943 film), Indian film
- Ishaara (1964 film), Indian film

== People ==
- Ishaara Nair (born 1993), Indian actress

== See also ==
- Ishara (disambiguation)
