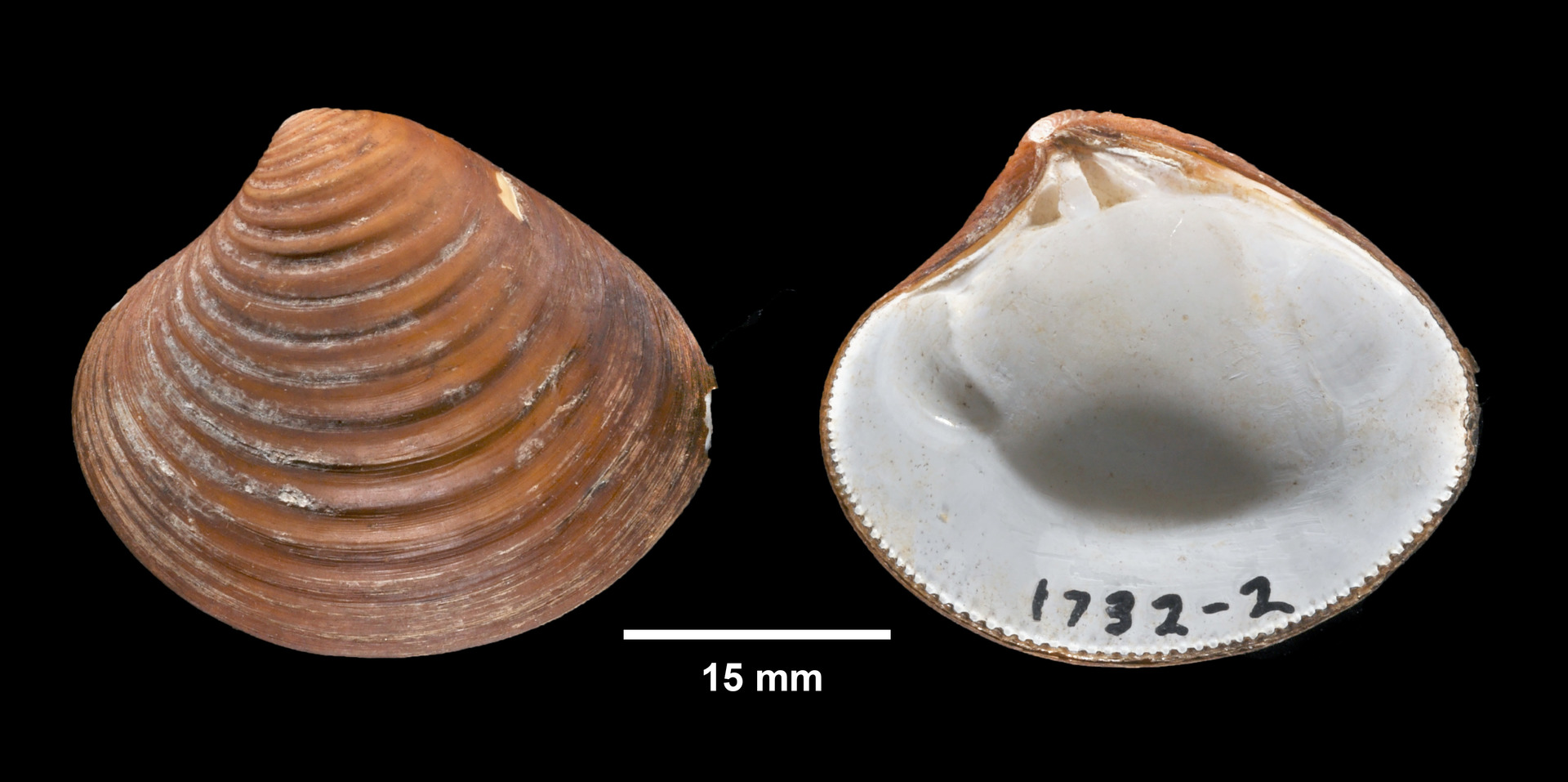

Scientific classification
- Kingdom: Animalia
- Phylum: Mollusca
- Class: Bivalvia
- Order: Carditida
- Superfamily: Crassatelloidea
- Family: Astartidae
- Genus: Astarte
- Species: A. undata

Binomial name
- Astarte undata Gould, 1841

= Astarte undata =

Species of bivalve

Astarte undata, or the waved astarte, is a species of bivalve mollusc in the family Astartidae. It can be found along the Atlantic coast of North America, ranging from Labrador to Maryland.
