= Bojia =

Bojia may refer to:

- Bojia, a village in Cornereva Commune, Caraș-Severin County, Romania
- Yadesa Bojia, Ethiopian-American artist

== See also ==
- Bogia (disambiguation)
