= Velutina schneideri =

Scientific classification
- Kingdom: Animalia
- Phylum: Mollusca
- Class: Gastropoda
- Subclass: Caenogastropoda
- Order: Littorinimorpha
- Family: Velutinidae
- Genus: Velutina
- Species: V. schneideri

Binomial name
- Velutina schneideri Friele, 1886

Species of gastropod

Velutina schneideri is a species of small sea snail, similar to a regular snail, a marine gastropod mollusk in the family Velutinidae.

== Distribution ==
Distribution of Velutina schneideri include European waters.
