= Bichoristes =

Scientific classification
- Kingdom: Animalia
- Phylum: Mollusca
- Class: Gastropoda
- Subclass: Vetigastropoda
- Family: Choristellidae
- Genus: Bichoristes; McLean, 1992

Genus of gastropods

Bichoristes is a genus of sea snails, marine gastropod mollusks in the family Choristellidae.

== Species ==
Species within the genus Bichoristes include:

- Bichoristes wareni McLean, 1992
