= Ishtar (disambiguation) =

Ishtar is a Mesopotamian deity.

Ishtar may also refer to:

== Architecture ==
- Ishtar Gate, a gate to the inner city of ancient Babylon, and a smaller gate reconstructed in the Pergamon Museum in the 1930s

== Astronomy ==
- 7088 Ishtar, a binary near-Earth asteroid
- Ishtar Terra, an area on the planet Venus

== Arts, entertainment, and media ==
- Ishtar TV, Iraqi broadcasting company
- Ishtar (singer), French-Israeli pop singer and vocalist
- Ishtar (band), a Belgian folk band
- Ishtar (film), a 1987 film written and directed by Elaine May
- Ishtar, a fictional planet in Poul Anderson's novel Fire Time
- Ishtar, a character in the game series The Tower of Druaga
- Ishtar, a character in the anime Macross II
- Ishtar, the main character of the manga Vampire Game
- Ishtar, a character in the anime Fate/Grand Order - Absolute Demonic Front: Babylonia

== See also ==
- Astarte (disambiguation), the Semitic counterpart
- Istar (disambiguation)
