= Antonio Boggia =

Italian serial killer

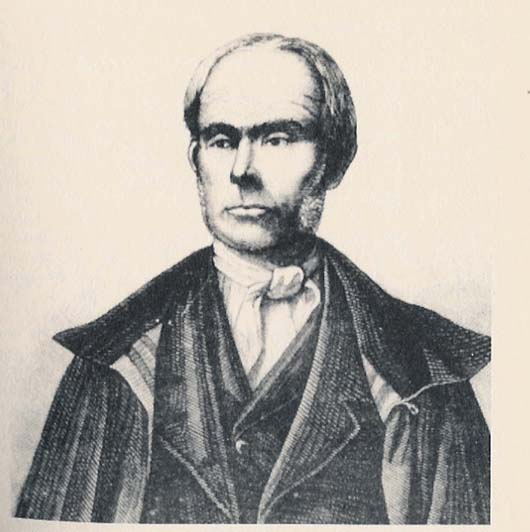
- Portrait of Boggia
- Born: 23 December 1799; Carate Urio, Cisalpine Republic
- Died: 8 April 1862 (aged 62); Milan, Kingdom of Italy
- Cause of death: Execution by hanging
- Other names: "El Togn" "The Monster of Stretta Bagnera" "The Monster of Milan"
- Conviction: Murder
- Penalty: Death

Details
- Victims: 4
- Span of crimes: 1849–1859
- Country: Italy
- State: Italy
- Date apprehended: 26 February 1860

Antonio Boggia (23 December 1799 – 8 April 1862), aka "Il Mostro di Stretta Bagnera" (The Monster of Bagnera lane) or "Il Mostro di Milano" (The Monster of Milan), is considered the first serial killer of Italy.

== Biography ==
Born in 1799 in Urio, a town on Lake Como, not far from the border with Switzerland. In 1824 Boggia (aged 25) had his first issues with the law with complaints of fraudulence and many false contracts. He fled to the Kingdom of Sardinia where he was subject to a further trial because of a frenzy and attempted murder. He was jailed, but took advantage of a revolt and escaped, returning to the Kingdom of Lombardy-Venetia, as it was known at the time. He moved to Milan, and thanks to his ability to speak German, was given a job at the Palazzo Cusani as the seat of the military commander of Austria. He worked there as a firestoker and moved to a residence on Via Gesù.

In 1831 he got married and went to live with his wife in Via Nerino, 2 in a house with their landlady, Ester Maria Perrocchio, who would become one of his victims. Boggia committed his first murder in April 1849. The victim was Angelo Ribbone who was robbed of 1,400 svanziche and his body was dismembered and hidden in a basement on Stretta Bagnera. On 26 February 1850, following the creation of the Carabinierei Reali, with their offices in Via Moscova in Milan, Giovanni Murier reported the disappearance of his mother, Ester Maria Perrocchio, aged 76.

Judge Crivelli took up the investigation. He discovered a fake power of attorney document, officiated by a notary from Bolza di Como, which made Antonio Boggia the administrator and sole inheritor of Perrocchio's property. He also discovered a preexisting charge against Boggia from 1851, in which he tried to kill an acquaintance with an axe, a one Giovanni Comi. Boggia was sentenced by the Austrian courts and spent 3 months in a prison asylum for the insane before being released.

Crivelli then gathered testimony from the Neighbours of his address at Via Nerino, who claimed they had seen Boggia struggling with bags of bricks, mortar and sand in a warehouse on Stretta Bagnera, close to Via Torino in the busy centre of Milan, between the Basilica di Sant'Ambrogio and the Duomo. A search of the site discovered the body of Ester Perrocchio buried in a niche. In a desk drawer at Boggia's apartment, they found another two fake power of attorney documents, one for Angelo Serafino Ribbone, a labourer and an old colleague of his, who had authorised him to take Ribbone's belongings to Boggia's aunt's house in Urio. People had lost track of where Ribbone was now, he was the first victim.

In the second fake document, the hardware/ironware owner, Pietro Meazza, entrusted Boggia with selling his little shop and cellar on Stretta Bagnera. His whereabouts were also unknown at the time. An inspection of the cellar brought a disturbing surprise in that they found under the floor the two bodies of the missing persons, and a third, unexpected body. After much research, they discovered it was the body of Giuseppe Marchesotti, a bulk seller of corn grain. During the trial, he confessed to the 4 murders and pleaded insanity throughout. He was found guilty and sentenced to death by hanging.

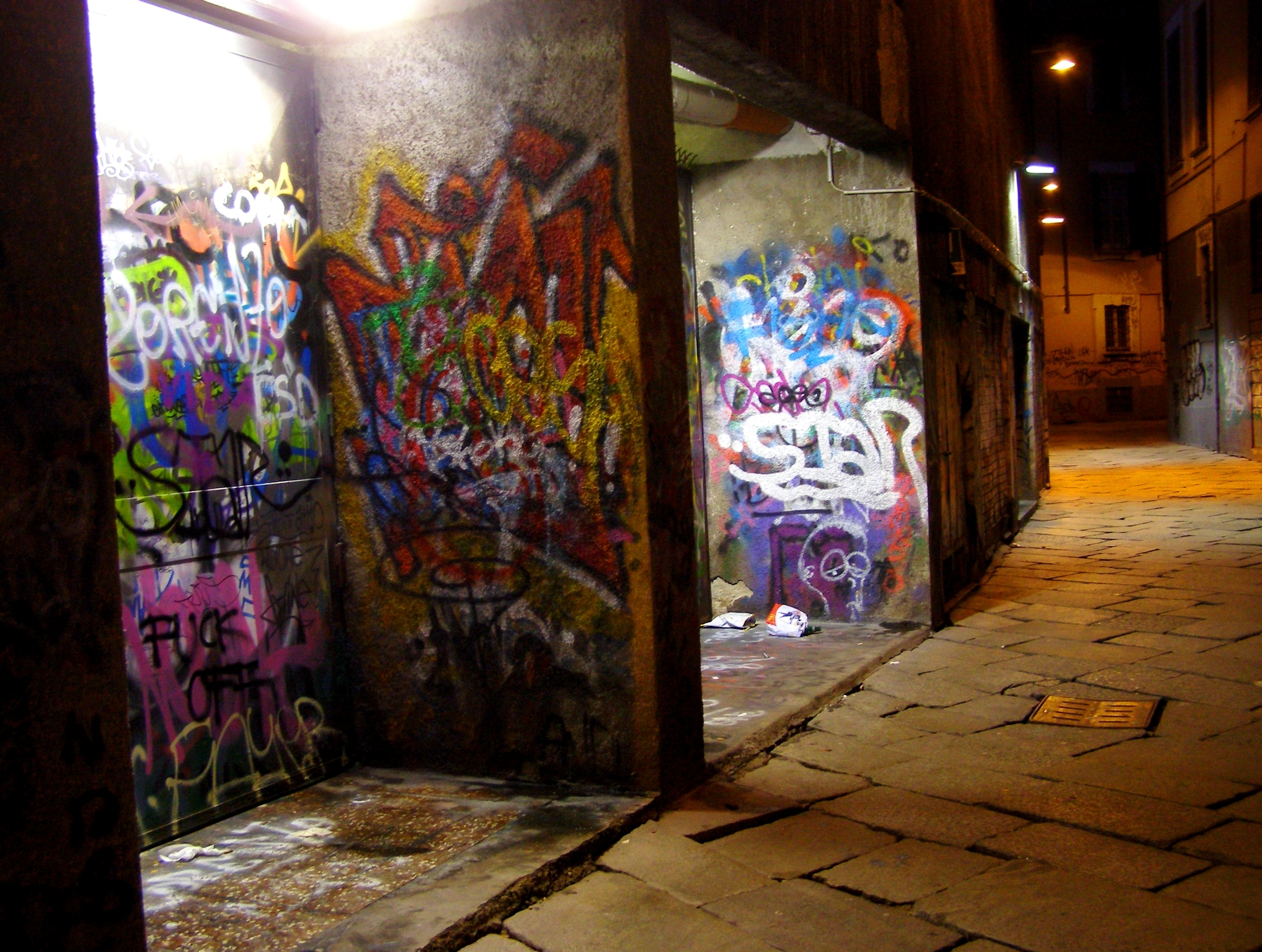
Current photo of Via Bagnera in Milan where Antonio Boggia lived and where he died.

His execution was carried out on 8 April 1862, not far from the bastions between Porta Ludovica and Porta Vigentina. It was the last death sentence given to a civilian in Milan until the Second World War. In fact, the death penalty was abolished in 1890 by the Zanardelli Code. Boggia's body was decapitated and his body was buried in the cemetery of Gentilino, close to the bastion of Porta Ludovica while his head was put on display in the anatomy lab of the Ospedale Maggiore, by request of Dr Pietro Labus and later given to the Father of Criminology, Cesare Lombroso, who, with great clamour, published confirmation on his theories of those 'born delinquent'.

His head was then taken in 1949 to the main cemetery of Milan (Cimitero Maggiore). This was due to the downsizing of parts of the hospital in which it was housed and all human remains were buried in the cemetery together. In October 2009 a large metal cleaver was discovered in a collectors market, complete with a box labelled 'Ospedale Maggiore', and a note affixed to the handle "dal Antonio Boggia" The cleaver is still on display now at the Museo di Arte Criminologica di Olevano di Lomellina.

It is said that the ghost of the Antonio Boggia still roams the streets close to Via Bagnera, where he appears in an icy gust of wind to envelop people.

== See also ==
- List of serial killers by country

== Bibliography ==
- Andrea Accorsi and Massimo Centini: The bloody history of serial killers, Newton Compton Editori, 2003
- Giovanni Luzzi: The yellow of the narrow Bagnera (coll. NeroGiallo), Meravigli edizioni 2016
- Luca Steffenoni and Manuela Alessandra Filippi: Psycho Maps. Two wayfarers lost between art and crimes in Milan, ed. Adagio 2014 ISBN 978-88-96337-14-1
- Fabrizio Carcano: Mala tempora, Mursia Editore 2014, ISBN 978-88-42553-58-8
- Alberto Paleari: The inspiration of evil (Dal Mondo series), Edizioni e/o 2013, ISBN 978-88-66323-71-6
- Alberto Paleari: The inspiration of the evil Author's Cut, selection of cut and commented scenes of the novel L'estro del male
- Maurizio Cucchi: The Indifference of the Assassin, 2012, Guanda Editions
