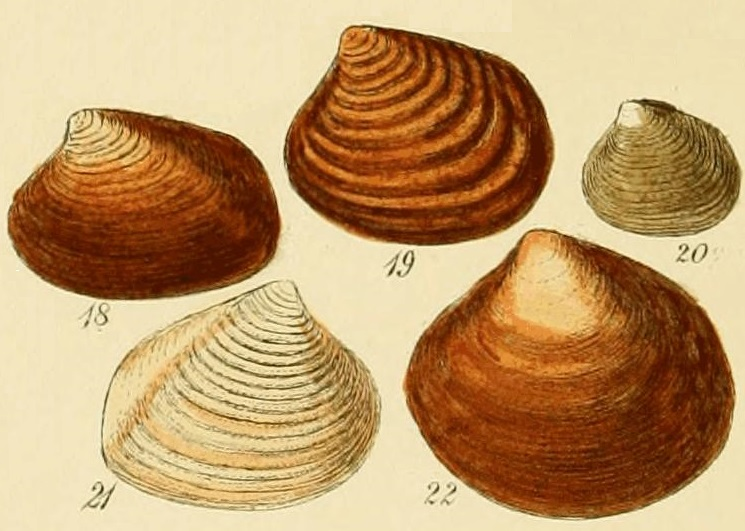
- 18. A. elliptica; 19. A. sulcata; 20. A. montagui; 21. A. crebricostata; 22. A. arctica

Scientific classification
- Domain: Eukaryota
- Kingdom: Animalia
- Phylum: Mollusca
- Class: Bivalvia
- Order: Carditida
- Family: Astartidae
- Genus: Astarte; J. Sowerby, 1816

Type species
- Venus scotica Maton & Racket, 1807

Synonyms
- Astartella Filatova, 1958; Crassina Lamarck, 1818; Elliptica Filatova, 1957; Filatovaella Merklin, 1959; Isocrassina Chavan, 1950; Laevastarte Hinsch, 1952; Nicania Leach, 1819; Rictocyma Dall, 1871; Tridonta Schumacher, 1817

= Astarte (bivalve) =

Astarte Temporal range: Sandbian-Present

Genus of bivalves

Astarte is a genus of bivalve mollusc in the Astartidae family. It was circumscribed by James Sowerby in 1816. As of 2017, WoRMS recognizes approximately 33 species in this genus.

Species include:

- Astarte acuticostata Friele, 1877
- Astarte arctica (Gray, 1824)
- Astarte borealis (Schumacher, 1817)
- Astarte castanea (Say, 1822)
- Astarte crebricostata McAndrew & Forbes, 1847
- Astarte crenata (Gray, 1824)
- Astarte elliptica (Brown, 1827)
- Astarte fusca (Poli, 1791)
- Astarte montagui (Dillwyn, 1817)
- Astarte subaequilatera G. B. Sowerby II, 1854
- Astarte sulcata (da Costa, 1778)
- Astarte undata Gould, 1841

Approximately nine of its species can be found in the waters of Europe.
