= Astarte Horn =

Peak associated with Venus and Astarte

Astarte Horn (71°40′S 68°52′W) is a pyramidal peak lying about 9.9 miles (16 km) inland from George VI Sound at the south end of the north–south range extending to Mount Umbriel, in eastern Alexander Island. The feature was mapped from trimetrogon air photography taken by the Ronne Antarctic Research Expedition, 1947–48, and from survey by the Falkland Islands Dependencies Survey, 1948–50, and named by the United Kingdom Antarctic Place-Names Committee in association with nearby Venus Glacier; the goddess Venus being identified with the Phoenician goddess Astarte in mythology.
