= Limneria insculpta =

Scientific classification
- Kingdom: Animalia
- Phylum: Mollusca
- Class: Gastropoda
- Subclass: Caenogastropoda
- Order: Littorinimorpha
- Family: Velutinidae
- Genus: Limneria
- Species: L. insculpta

Binomial name
- Limneria insculpta Odhner, 1913

Synonyms
- Velutina insculpta Odhner, 1913 (basionym)

Species of gastropod

Limneria insculpta is a species of small sea snail, a marine gastropod mollusk in the family Velutinidae.
