= Bogia (gastropod) =

Scientific classification
- Kingdom: Animalia
- Phylum: Mollusca
- Class: Gastropoda
- Subclass: Vetigastropoda
- Order: Lepetellida
- Family: Lepetellidae
- Subfamily: Lepetellinae
- Genus: Bogia; Dantart & Luque, 1994

Genus of gastropods

Bogia is a genus of sea snails, marine gastropod mollusks in the family Lepetellidae.

== Species ==
Species within the genus Bogia include:

- Bogia labronica (Bogi, 1984)
