= Ishara =

Ishara may refer to:

- Išḫara, a Hurrian deity
- Ishara, a small town in Ogun State in Nigeria
- Ishara Nanayakkara, Sri Lankan businessman
- Ishara TV, Indian Hindi-language television channel
- Ishara Yar, a fictional character in Star Trek: The Next Generation

== See also ==
- Ishaara (disambiguation)
