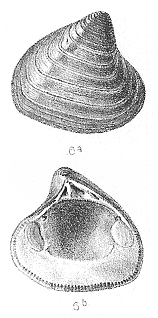
- Astarte trigonata

Scientific classification
- Kingdom: Animalia
- Phylum: Mollusca
- Class: Bivalvia
- Order: Carditida
- Superfamily: Crassatelloidea
- Family: Astartidae d'Orbigny, 1844

Genera and species
- See text

= Astartidae =

Family of bivalves

Astartidae is a family of bivalves related in the order Carditida.

== Astartidae taxonomy ==
- Astarte J. Sowerby, 1816
  - Astarte acuticostata J. G. Jeffreys, 1881
  - Astarte arctica (J. E. Gray, 1824)
  - Astarte bennetti Dall, 1903
  - Astarte borealis (Schumacher, 1817) – northern astarte
  - Astarte castanea (Say, 1822) – chestnut astarte
  - Astarte compacta Carpenter, 1864
  - Astarte crebricostata (Da Costa, 1778)
  - Astarte crenata (J. E. Gray, 1824)
  - Astarte elliptica (T. Brown, 1827) – elliptical astarte
  - Astarte esquimalti (Baird, 1863)
  - Astarte filatovae Habe, 1964
  - Astarte globula Dall, 1886
  - Astarte laurentiana
  - Astarte liogona Dall, 1903
  - Astarte mirabilis (Dall, 1871)
  - Astarte montagui (Dillwyn, 1817)
  - Astarte nana Dall, 1886
  - Astarte polaris Dall, 1903
  - Astarte quadrans Gould, 1841
  - Astarte smithii Dall, 1886
  - Astarte subaequilatera Sowerby, 1854 – lentil astarte
  - Astarte sulcata (Decosta, 1778)
  - Astarte triangularis
  - Astarte undata Gould, 1841 – waved astarte
  - Astarte vernicosa Dall, 1903
  - Astarte willetti Dall, 1917
- Digitaria S. Wood, 1853
  - Digitaria agulhasensi (Jaeckel & Thiele, 1931)
  - Digitaria digitaria (Linnaeus, 1758)
- Goodallia Turton, 1822
  - Goodallia triangularis (Montagu, 1803)

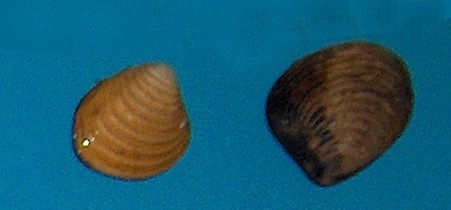
Astarte sulcata
