= Cardiniidae =

Cardiniidae Temporal range: 478.6–2.588 Ma

Scientific classification
- Kingdom: Animalia
- Phylum: Mollusca
- Class: Bivalvia
- Order: Carditida
- Superfamily: Carditoidea
- Family: †Cardiniidae; Zittel, 1881

Genera
- Arctocardinia; Cardinia; Cypricardinia; Minepharus; Pseudastarte; Tellidorella; Torastarte

Extinct family of bivalves

Cardiniidae is a family of bivalves in the order Carditida.
