= Thomas Brown (naturalist) =

British naturalist and malacologist

Captain Thomas Brown FRSE FLS (1785 – 8 October 1862) was a British naturalist and malacologist.

Brown was born in Perth, Scotland, and educated at the Royal High School, Edinburgh.

When he was twenty, he joined the Forfar and Kincardine Militia, rising to the rank of captain in 1811. When he was quartered in Manchester, he became interested in nature, and edited Oliver Goldsmith's Animated Nature. After his regiment was disbanded he bought the Fifeshire flax mill. That, however, burned down before Brown had the opportunity to insure it. He then started to write books about nature for a living.

He was elected a Fellow of the Royal Society of Edinburgh in 1818, one of his proposers being James Jardine.

In 1840 he became curator of the Manchester Museum, where he served for twenty-two years.

He wrote several natural history books, a few dealing with conchology. He became a fellow of the Linnean Society, a member of the Wernerian, Kirwanian and Phrenological Societies, and president of the Physical Society. Material from his books was used by United States naturalist Thomas Wyatt for his book Manual of Conchology.

A species of sea snail, a marine gastropod, was named after him: Zebina browniana d'Orbigny, 1842.

== Selected works ==
- Brown T. 1827. Illustrations of conchology of Great Britain and Ireland drawn from nature. pp. 1–65, Pl. 1–52. Edinburgh. (Lizars).
- Brown T. 1832. The book of butterflies, sphinges, and moths: illustrated by ninety-six engravings, coloured after nature.
- Brown T. 1835. The conchologist’s text-book, embracing the arrangements of Jean-Baptiste Lamarck and Linnaeus, with a glossary of technical terms. - illustrated by nineteen engravings on steel. 1835 version, 1853 version.
- Brown, T. 1843. The book of butterflies and moths: illustrated by forty-eight engravings, coloured after nature.
- Brown T. 1844. Illustrations of the recent conchology of Great Britain and Ireland, with the description and localities of all the species, marine, land, and fresh water.
- Brown T. 1845. Illustrations of the land and fresh water conchology of Great Britain and Ireland, with figures, descriptions, and localities of all the species.
- Brown T. 1849. Illustrations of the Fossil Conchology of Great Britain And Ireland, With Descriptions And Localities.
- Illustrations of the American ornithology of Alexander Wilson and Charles Lucien Bonaparte (1831–1835). These illustrations were also used in the three-volume "Jameson edition" of Wilson's American ornithology (published between 1801 and 1814)
- The taxidermist's manual, or, The art of collecting, preparing and preserving objects of natural history (Glasgow: Archibald Fullarton ... [and 3 others], 1833) xii, 150 p., VI leaves of plates
