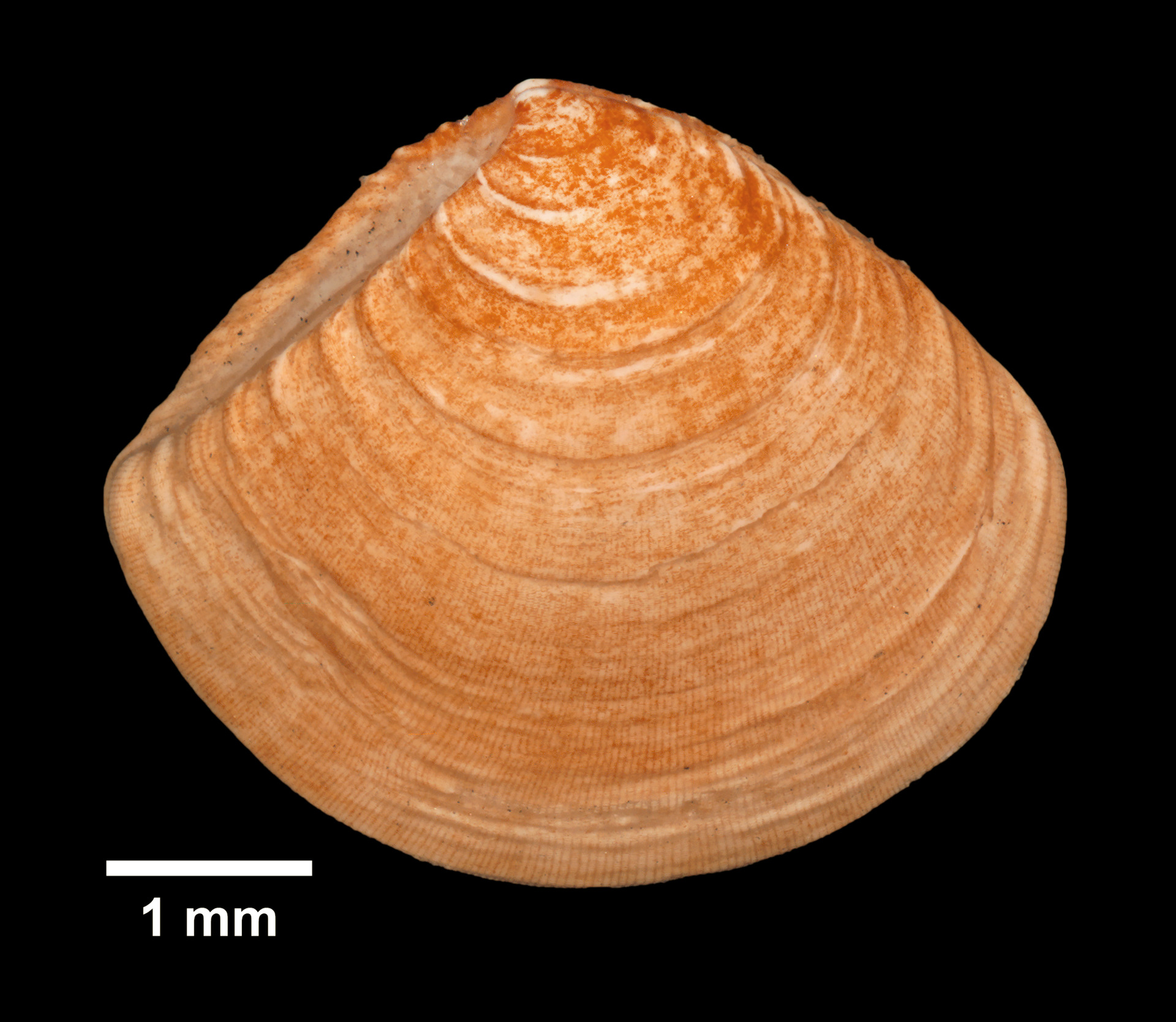
- Crassinella lunulata

Scientific classification
- Domain: Eukaryota
- Kingdom: Animalia
- Phylum: Mollusca
- Class: Bivalvia
- Subterclass: Archiheterodonta
- Order: Carditida
- Superfamily: Crassatelloidea; Férussac, 1822

Families
- See text

Synonyms
- Astartoidea (according to WoRMS)

= Crassatelloidea =

Crassatelloidea Temporal range: 485.4–0 Ma

Superfamily of molluscs

Crassatelloidea is a superfamily of bivalves in the order Carditida. In the World Register of Marine Species (WoRMS), Astartoidea is considered a junior synonym of Crassatelloidea, whereas in ITIS Astartoidea is a separate family containing Astartidae and Cardiniidae – Cardiniidae itself being classified instead in Carditoidea by WoRMS.

== List of families ==
According to ITIS:

- Crassatellidae

According to the World Register of Marine Species:

- Astartidae
- Crassatellidae
