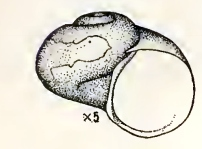
- Drawing of a shell of Choristella leptalea

Scientific classification
- Kingdom: Animalia
- Phylum: Mollusca
- Class: Gastropoda
- Subclass: Vetigastropoda
- Superfamily: Seguenzioidea
- Family: Choristellidae; Bouchet & Warén, 1979

Synonyms
- Choristellinae Bouchet & Warén, 1979

= Choristellidae =

Family of gastropods

Choristellidae is a family of gastropods in the superfamily Seguenzioidea (according to the taxonomy of the Gastropoda (Bouchet & Rocroi, 2017)

== Genera ==
Genera in the family Choristellidae include:

- Bichoristes McLean, 1992
- Choristella Bush, 1897
