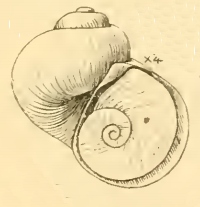
- Choristella tenera (A. E. Verrill, 1882); family Lepetellidae; off New England

Scientific classification
- Kingdom: Animalia
- Phylum: Mollusca
- Class: Gastropoda
- Subclass: Vetigastropoda
- Order: Lepetellida
- Superfamily: Lepetelloidea
- Family: Lepetellidae; Dall, 1882

Genera
- See text

= Lepetellidae =

Family of gastropods

Lepetellidae is a taxonomic family of small deepwater sea snails or limpets, marine gastropod molluscs in the superfamily Lepetelloidea in the clade Vetigastropoda (according to the taxonomy of the Gastropoda by Bouchet & Rocroi, 2005). (It was in the order Cocculiniformia before).

== Taxonomy ==
This family consists of two following subfamilies (according to the taxonomy of the Gastropoda by Bouchet & Rocroi, 2005):

- Lepetellinae Dall, 1882
- Choristellinae Bouchet & Warén, 1979

== Genera ==
Genera within the family Lepetellidae include:

- Bichoristes McLean, 1992
- Bogia Dantart & Luque, 1994
- Choristella Bush, 1897
- Lepetella Verrill, 1880
- Tecticrater Dall, 1956
- Tectisumen Finley, 1927
