= List of moths of Australia (Drepanidae) =

Partial list of Australian moths

This is a list of the Australian species of the family Drepanidae. It also acts as an index to the species articles and forms part of the full List of moths of Australia.

== Drepaninae ==
- Astatochroa fuscimargo (Warren, 1896)
- Cyclura lechriodes (Turner, 1926)
- Oreta jaspidea (Warren, 1896)
- Tridrepana lunulata (Butler, 1887)

The following species belongs to the subfamily Drepaninae, but has not been assigned to a genus yet. Given here is the original name given to the species when it was first described:

- Oreta miltodes Lower, 1903

== Unplaced to subfamily ==
- Hypsidia australica (Sick, 1938)
- Hypsidia erythropsalis Rothschild, 1896
- Hypsidia grisea Scoble & E.D. Edwards, 1988
- Hypsidia microspila (Turner, 1942)
- Hypsidia niphosema (Lower, 1908)
- Hypsidia robinsoni Hacobian, 1986
