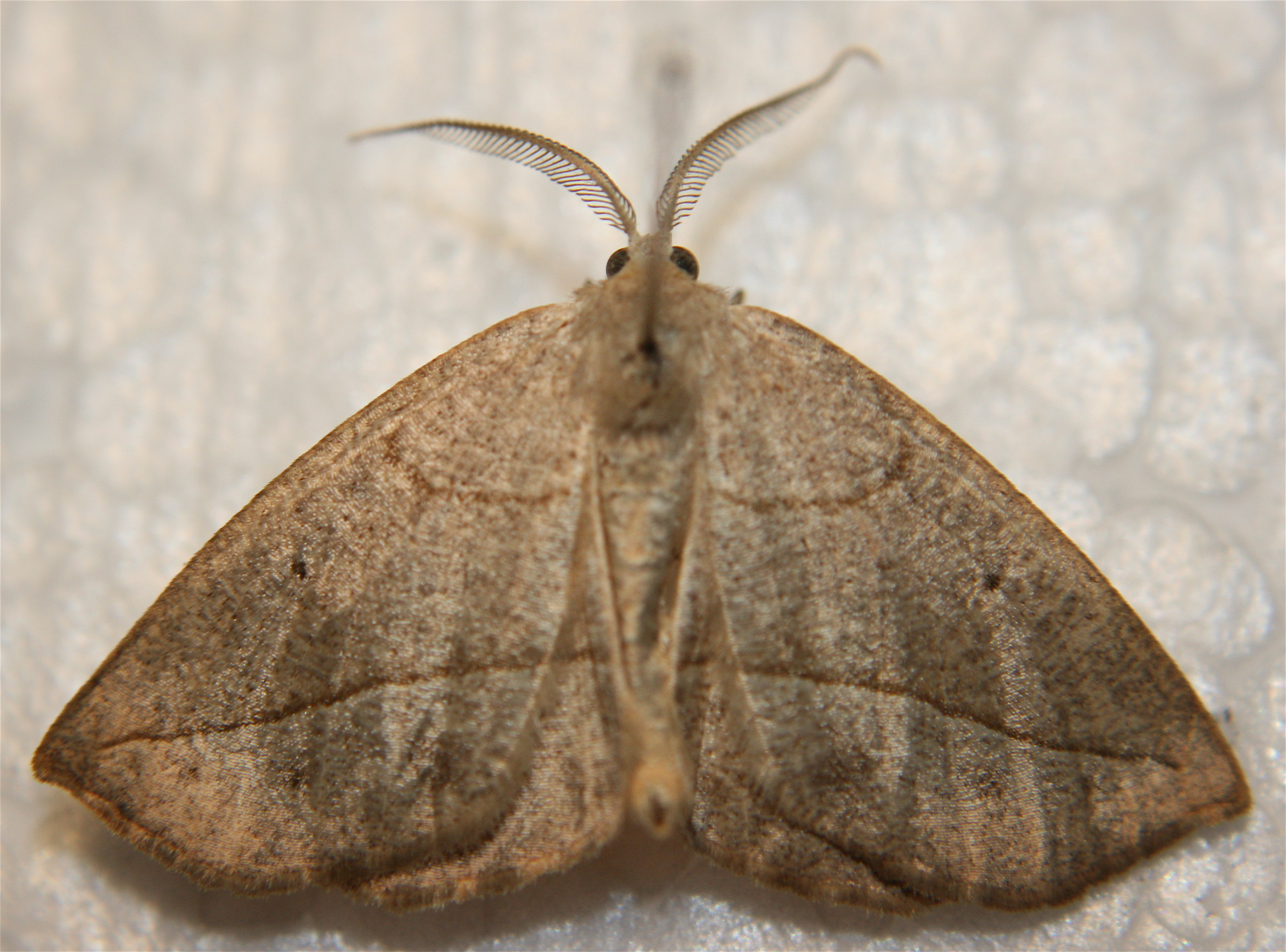

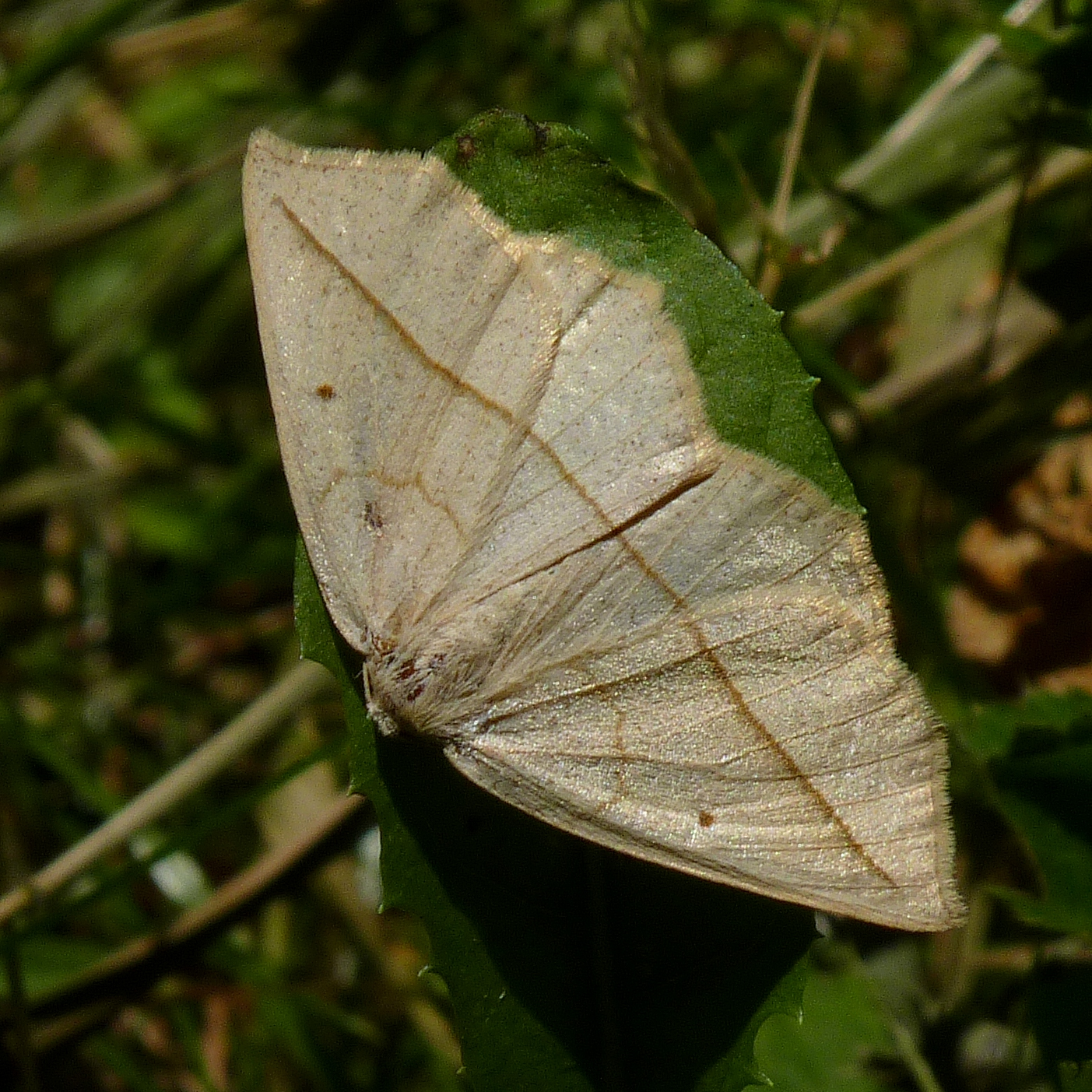

Scientific classification
- Domain: Eukaryota
- Kingdom: Animalia
- Phylum: Arthropoda
- Class: Insecta
- Order: Lepidoptera
- Family: Geometridae
- Genus: Eusarca
- Species: E. confusaria

Binomial name
- Eusarca confusaria (Hübner, 1806)

= Eusarca confusaria =

Species of moth

Eusarca confusaria, the confused eusarca, is a moth species of the family Geometridae that occurs in North America and Brazil. It is the only member of the genus Eusarca that inhabits the northern portion of the United States and Canada.

== Identification ==
The wingspan of this species is between 29 and 41 mm. Adults are quite variable but tend to be yellow to tan with gray smudging, some specimens look exceptionally dark compared to lighter variants. Uncommonly individuals will have dark spotting in the subterminal area of the forewing. There are several species that are easily confused with E. confusaria including the dark-edged eusarca (Eusarca fundaria), juniper geometer (Patalene olyzonaria), curve-toothed geometer (Eutrapela clemataria), large maple spanworm (Prochoerodes lineola) and the rose hooktip (Oreta rosea).

== Life cycle ==
There is one flight from April to October throughout its range. Larvae feed on asters, clover, dandelions, and goldenrod.

== Range and habitat ==
Throughout its flight they can be found in the eastern portions of North America including Nova Scotia south to Florida. They are as far west as Texas and Saskatchewan. Throughout this range they can be found in meadows and fields with their host plants.
