= Oreta identata =

Scientific classification
- Domain: Eukaryota
- Kingdom: Animalia
- Phylum: Arthropoda
- Class: Insecta
- Order: Lepidoptera
- Family: Drepanidae
- Genus: Oreta
- Species: O. identata

Binomial name
- Oreta identata Watson, 1961

Species of hook-tip moth

Oreta identata is a moth in the family Drepanidae. It was described by Watson in 1961. It is found on Sulawesi.

The wingspan is 37–41.6 mm for males and 37.4–45.6 mm for females. Adults are similar to Oreta griseotincta and Oreta carnea.
