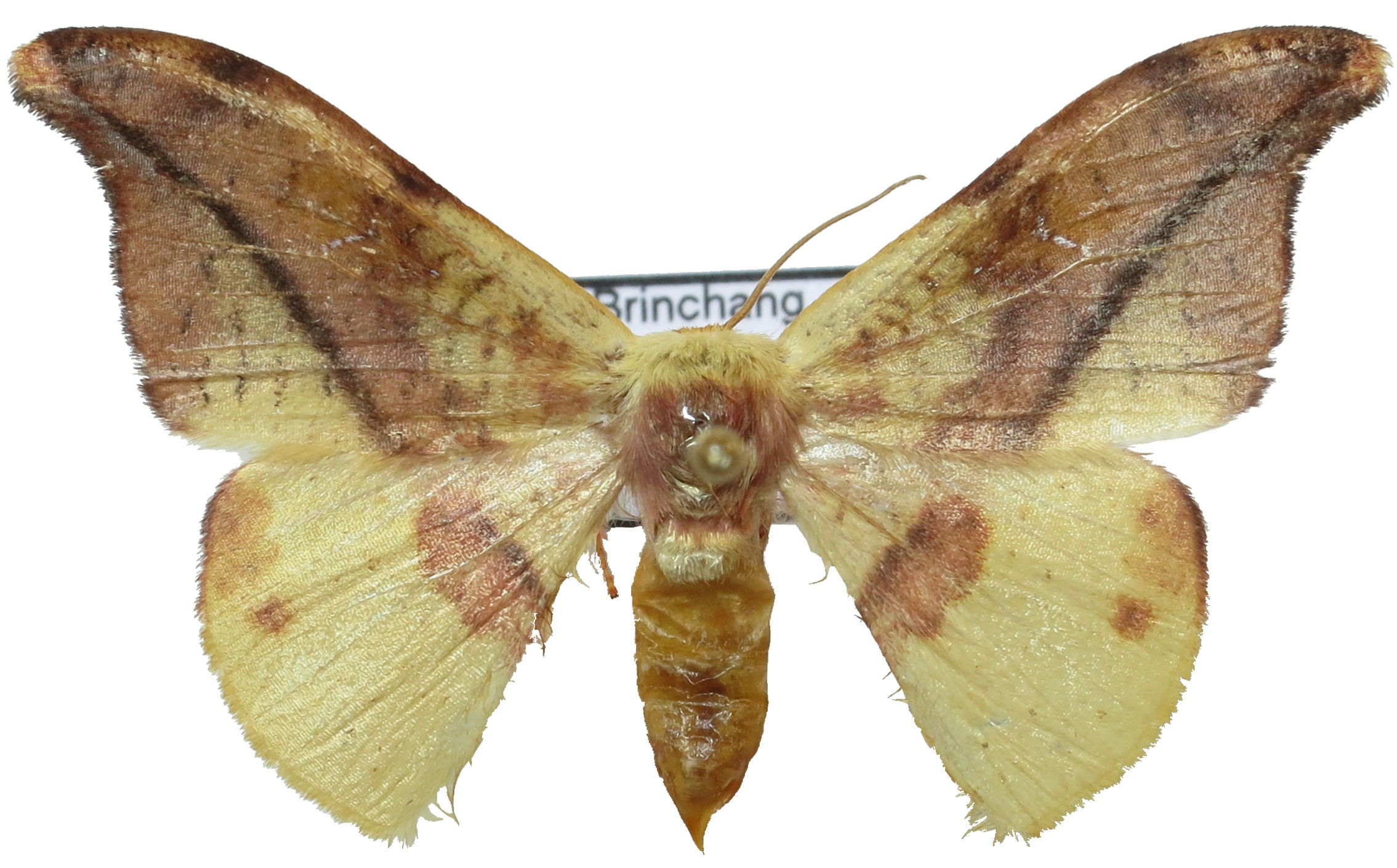
- Oreta obtusa aequitermen - Cameron Highlands

Scientific classification
- Kingdom: Animalia
- Phylum: Arthropoda
- Class: Insecta
- Order: Lepidoptera
- Family: Drepanidae
- Genus: Oreta
- Species: O. obtusa

Binomial name
- Oreta obtusa Walker, 1855

Subspecies
- See text

Synonyms
- Oreta obliquilinea Hampson, 1893; Psiloreta inconspicua Warren, 1923; Oreta sinuata H.F. Chu & L.Y. Wang, 1987; Oreta asignis H.F. Chu & L.Y. Wang, 1987

= Oreta obtusa =

Species of moth

Oreta obtusa is a moth in the family Drepanidae. It was described by Francis Walker in 1855. It is found in India, China, Myanmar and Indonesia.

The length of the forewings is 18–20 mm for males and 22–23 mm for females. No other species of the genus, except for Oreta brunnea, has a large dark spot near the outer margin of the hindwings.

== Subspecies ==
Oreta obtusa is divided into the following subspecies:

- Oreta obtusa obtusa (northern India)
- Oreta obtusa aequitermen Watson, 1961 (Malaya, Sumatra, Sulawesi)
- Oreta obtusa dejeani Watson, 1967 (China: Hainan, Guangxi, Sichuan, Tibet)
- Oreta obtusa javae Watson, 1961 (Java, Bali)
- Oreta obtusa speciosa (Bryk, 1943) (north-eastern Burma, China: Fujian, Sichuan)
