= Oreta suffusa =

Scientific classification
- Kingdom: Animalia
- Phylum: Arthropoda
- Class: Insecta
- Order: Lepidoptera
- Family: Drepanidae
- Genus: Oreta
- Species: O. suffusa

Binomial name
- Oreta suffusa Walker, 1855

Synonyms
- Oreta violacea Hampson, 1891; Psiloreta violacea

Species of hook-tip moth

Oreta suffusa is a moth in the family Drepanidae. It was described by Francis Walker in 1855. It is found in Sri Lanka and southern India.

Adults are lilac-fawn colour, the wings with numerous greyish spots, yellowish towards the base and along the exterior border. The forewings have a darker middle part, bounded on the inside by an undulating grey band and on the outside by a more oblique and straight yellow band. There is a blackish spot at the interior angle. The hindwings have a very narrow darker middle part.
