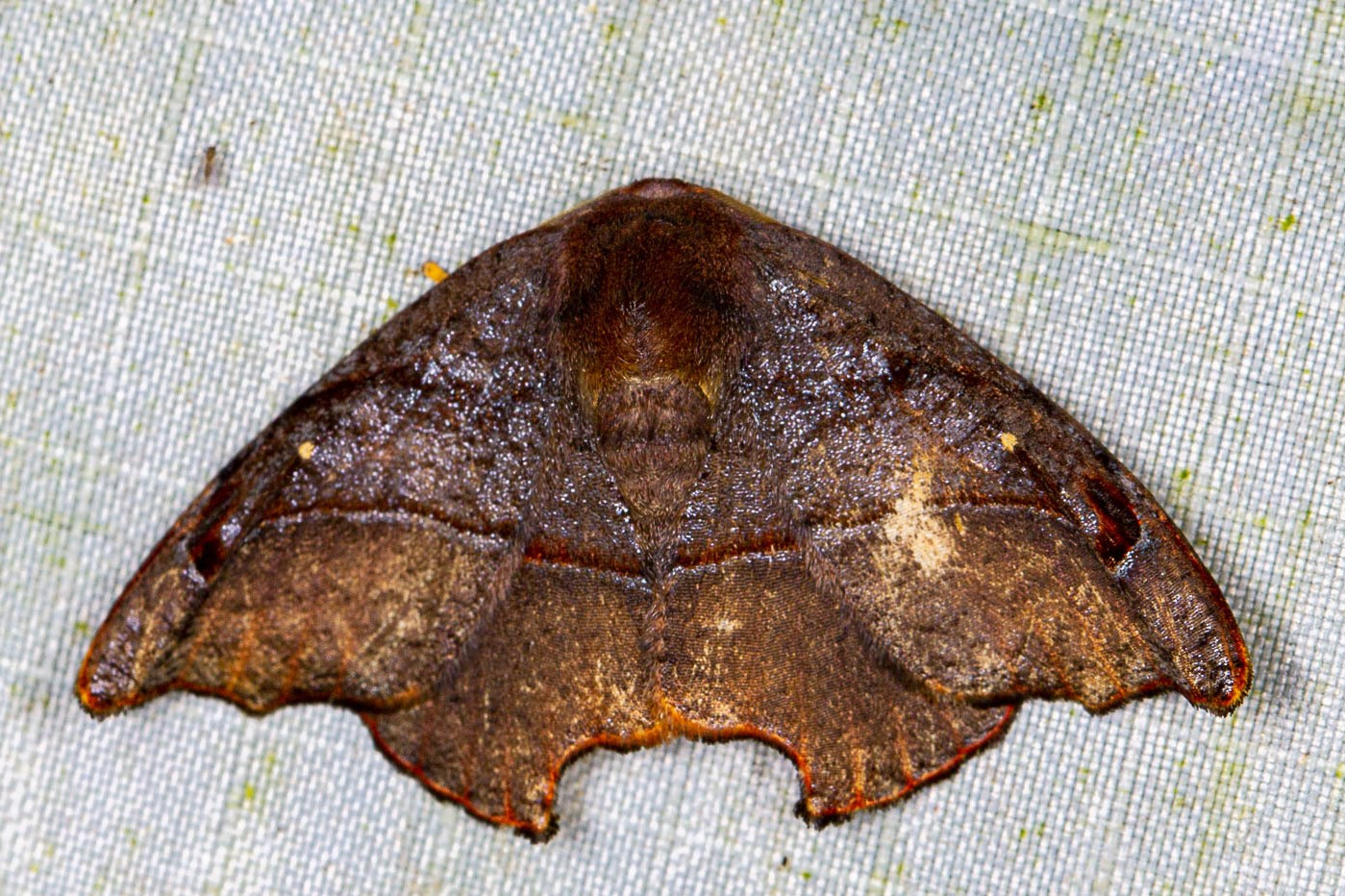

Scientific classification
- Kingdom: Animalia
- Phylum: Arthropoda
- Clade: Pancrustacea
- Class: Insecta
- Order: Lepidoptera
- Family: Drepanidae
- Genus: Neoreta
- Species: N. excisa

Binomial name
- Neoreta excisa (Warren, 1897)

Synonyms
- Cyclura excisa Warren, 1897; Amphitorna excisa (Warren, 1897)

= Neoreta excisa =

Species of hook-tip moth

Neoreta excisa is a species of moth in the family Drepanidae. It was first described by William Warren in 1897. It is found in Borneo, Peninsular Malaysia and Sumatra.

== Description ==
The wingspan is about 26 mm. The forewings are rufous fawn with a few brown striae. The lines are dark brown, the first from the costa shortly before the middle, acutely angled close to the costa, then oblique to near the base of the inner margin. The second from just beyond the middle, running obliquely outwards, with two bright brown velvety blotches on it, acutely angled outwards and incurved to near the middle of the inner margin. There is a minute white cell-dot. The hindwings have a whitish costal area and a fine slightly curved central brown line, with a dark brown cloud beyond it.
