= Oreta andrema =

Scientific classification
- Kingdom: Animalia
- Phylum: Arthropoda
- Clade: Pancrustacea
- Class: Insecta
- Order: Lepidoptera
- Family: Drepanidae
- Genus: Oreta
- Species: O. andrema

Binomial name
- Oreta andrema Wilkinson, 1972

Species of hook-tip moth

Oreta andrema is a moth in the family Drepanidae. It was described by Wilkinson in 1972. It is found in Nepal and China (Tibet).
