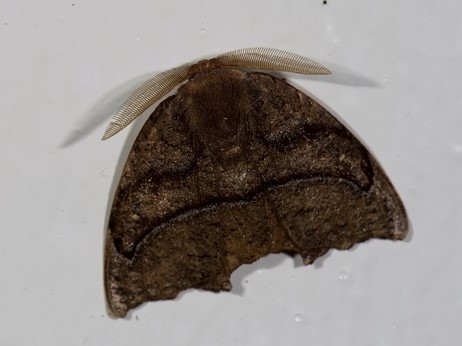
- Neoreta purpureofascia

Scientific classification
- Kingdom: Animalia
- Phylum: Arthropoda
- Clade: Pancrustacea
- Class: Insecta
- Order: Lepidoptera
- Family: Drepanidae
- Subfamily: Oretinae
- Genus: Neoreta; Warren, 1897

Synonyms
- Cyclura Warren, 1897; Procampsis Warren, 1923; Tomocerota Matsumura, 1921; Kosemponiola Strand, 1917; Amphitorna Turner, 1911

= Neoreta =

Moth genus in family Drepanidae

Neoreta is a genus of moths belonging to the subfamily Drepaninae.

== Species ==
- Neoreta albipuncta Hampson, 1893
- Neoreta brunhyala (Shen & Chen, 1990)
- Neoreta castanea Hampson, 1891
- Neoreta confusata Warren, 1899
- Neoreta excisa Warren, 1897
- Neoreta lechriodes Turner, 1926
- Neoreta olga Swinhoe, 1894
- Neoreta perexcisa Warren, 1923
- Neoreta purpureofascia (Wileman, 1911)
- Neoreta submontana Holloway, 1976
- Neoreta trogoptera Rothschild, 1915
