= Neoreta brunhyala =

Scientific classification
- Kingdom: Animalia
- Phylum: Arthropoda
- Clade: Pancrustacea
- Class: Insecta
- Order: Lepidoptera
- Family: Drepanidae
- Genus: Neoreta
- Species: N. brunhyala

Binomial name
- Neoreta brunhyala (Shen & Chen, 1990)

Synonyms
- Cyclura brunhyala Shen & Chen, 1990; Amphitorna brunhyala (Shen & Chen, 1990); Spectroreta thumba D.Y. Xin & X. Wang, 2011

Species of hook-tip moth

Neoreta brunhyala is a species of moth in the family Drepanidae. It was first described by Shen and Chen in 1990. It is found in China (Guangdong and Fujian).
