= Oreta perfida =

Scientific classification
- Domain: Eukaryota
- Kingdom: Animalia
- Phylum: Arthropoda
- Class: Insecta
- Order: Lepidoptera
- Family: Drepanidae
- Genus: Oreta
- Species: O. perfida

Binomial name
- Oreta perfida Warren, 1923

Species of hook-tip moth

Oreta perfida is a moth in the family Drepanidae. It was described by William Warren in 1923. It is found in New Guinea, where it is known from Papua.
