= Oreta unilinea =

Scientific classification
- Domain: Eukaryota
- Kingdom: Animalia
- Phylum: Arthropoda
- Class: Insecta
- Order: Lepidoptera
- Family: Drepanidae
- Genus: Oreta
- Species: O. unilinea

Binomial name
- Oreta unilinea (Warren, 1899)

Synonyms
- Cobanilla unilinea Warren, 1899; Holoreta cervina Warren, 1907; Oreta mollita Warren, 1923; Oreta mollita castaneata Warren, 1923

Species of hook-tip moth

Oreta unilinea is a moth in the family Drepanidae. It was described by William Warren in 1899. It is found in New Guinea, where it is known from Papua and Roon Island.

The wingspan is about 48 mm. The forewings are dull fulvous with a lilac tinge. The lower arm of the discocellular is marked with white scales. There is a deeper fulvous diffuse shade from the costa just before the middle, transversing the discocellular, and very obscurely curved towards the base of the inner margin. There is a deeper fulvous slightly flexuous line, edged externally with pale yellowish from just beyond the middle of the inner margin into the apex. The hindwings have a paler costal area and deeper fulvous central and marginal shades. The submarginal area has a few black scales and traces of two curved rows of darker spots between the veins. The discocellular is marked as in the forewings.
