= Eusarca falcata =

Scientific classification
- Kingdom: Animalia
- Phylum: Arthropoda
- Clade: Pancrustacea
- Class: Insecta
- Order: Lepidoptera
- Family: Geometridae
- Genus: Eusarca
- Species: E. falcata

Binomial name
- Eusarca falcata (Packard, 1873)

Synonyms
- Eutrapela falcata Packard, 1873

Species of moth

Eusarca falcata is a species of geometrid moth in the family Geometridae. It is found in North America.

The MONA or Hodges number for Eusarca falcata is 6927.
