= Eusarca tibiaria =

Scientific classification
- Kingdom: Animalia
- Phylum: Arthropoda
- Class: Insecta
- Order: Lepidoptera
- Family: Geometridae
- Tribe: Ourapterygini
- Genus: Eusarca
- Species: E. tibiaria

Binomial name
- Eusarca tibiaria (McDunnough, 1940)

Synonyms
- Apicia tibiaria McDunnough, 1940

Species of moth

Eusarca tibiaria is a species of geometrid moth in the family Geometridae.

The MONA or Hodges number for Eusarca tibiaria is 6940.
