= Neoreta castanea =

Scientific classification
- Kingdom: Animalia
- Phylum: Arthropoda
- Clade: Pancrustacea
- Class: Insecta
- Order: Lepidoptera
- Family: Drepanidae
- Genus: Neoreta
- Species: N. castanea

Binomial name
- Neoreta castanea (Hampson, 1891)

Synonyms
- Oreta castanea Hampson, 1891; Psiloreta castanea; Oreta rotundipex Hampson, 1891; Psiloreta rotundapex; Amphitorna castanea (Hampson, 1891)

Species of hook-tip moth

Neoreta castanea is a species of moth in the family Drepanidae. It was first described by George Hampson in 1891. It is found in the Nilgiri Mountains of India.

== Description ==
The wingspan is 28–36 mm. Adults are pale reddish brown, the wings evenly striated with brown. There is an oblique line from the apex of the forewings to the middle of the inner margin of the hindwings, bent near the apex, where there is a deep black spot above it. There are traces of a dark antemedial line on the forewings and the costa is red-brown. There is a white speck on the discocellulars.
