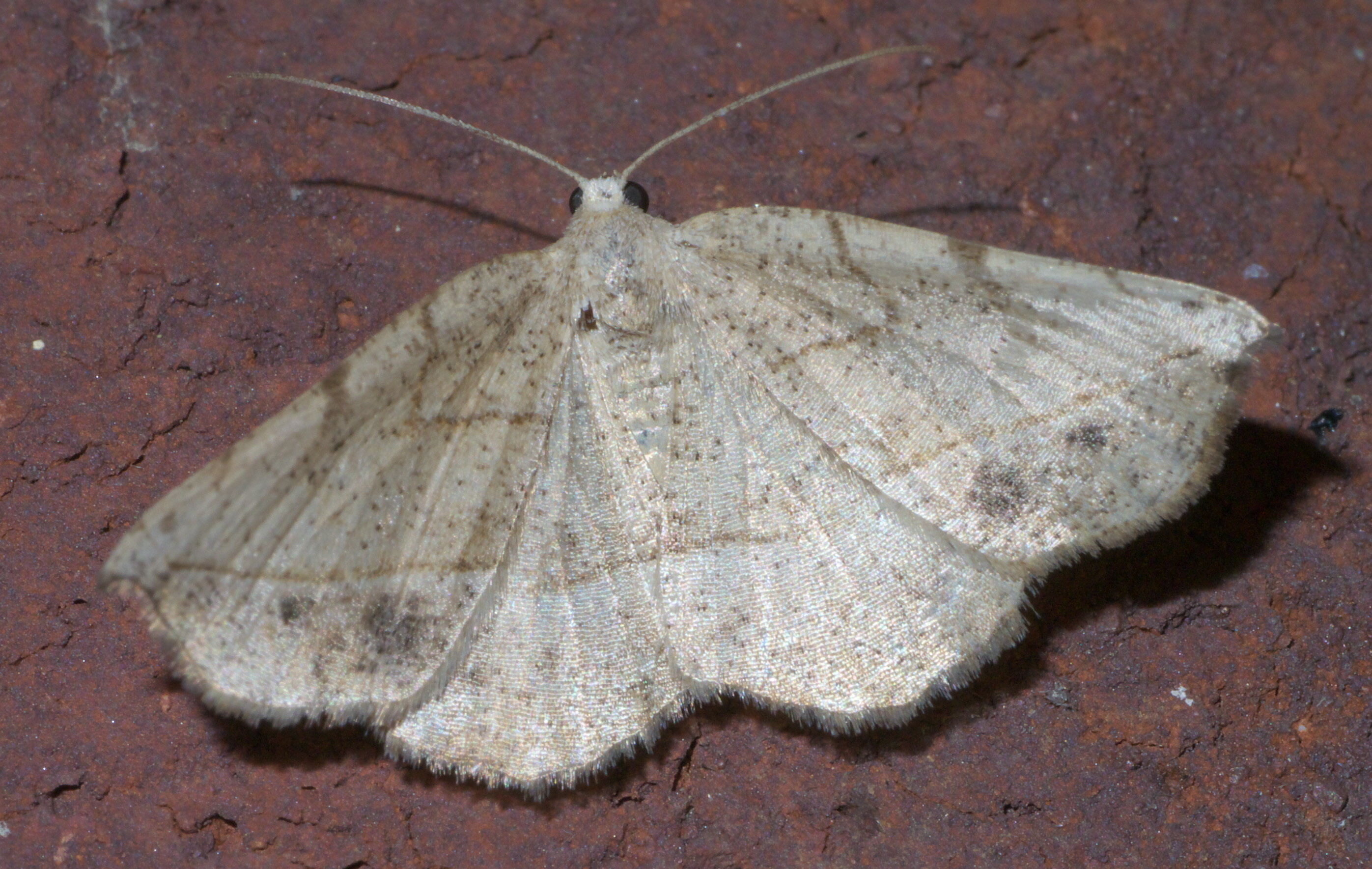

Scientific classification
- Domain: Eukaryota
- Kingdom: Animalia
- Phylum: Arthropoda
- Class: Insecta
- Order: Lepidoptera
- Family: Geometridae
- Genus: Eusarca
- Species: E. packardaria

Binomial name
- Eusarca packardaria (McDunnough, 1940)

Synonyms
- Apicia packardaria McDunnough, 1940

= Eusarca packardaria =

Species of moth

Eusarca packardaria, or Packard's eusarca, is a species of geometrid moth in the family Geometridae. It is found in North America.

The MONA or Hodges number for Eusarca packardaria is 6936.
