= Oreta rubromarginata =

Scientific classification
- Domain: Eukaryota
- Kingdom: Animalia
- Phylum: Arthropoda
- Class: Insecta
- Order: Lepidoptera
- Family: Drepanidae
- Genus: Oreta
- Species: O. rubromarginata

Binomial name
- Oreta rubromarginata C. Swinhoe, 1902

Synonyms
- Gonoreta subrosea Warren, 1923

Species of hook-tip moth

Oreta rubromarginata is a moth in the family Drepanidae. It was described by Charles Swinhoe in 1902. It is found on Borneo and Sumatra.

The forewings are yellow with a broad marginal chestnut-red band. The hindwings are yellow in the interior part and the chestnut-red band is very deep, occupying nearly one-third of the wings. There is a large chestnut-red patch with four or five angulated projections in the middle of the wing.
