= Oreta hoenei =

Scientific classification
- Kingdom: Animalia
- Phylum: Arthropoda
- Class: Insecta
- Order: Lepidoptera
- Family: Drepanidae
- Genus: Oreta
- Species: O. hoenei

Binomial name
- Oreta hoenei Watson, 1967

Synonyms
- Oreta trianga H.F. Chu & L.Y. Wang, 1987

Species of hook-tip moth

Oreta hoenei is a moth in the family Drepanidae. It was described by Watson in 1967. It is found in China (Heilongjiang, Shanxi, Henan, Shaanxi, Ningxia, Gansu, Zhejiang, Hubei, Jiangxi, Hunan, Fujian, Sichuan, Chongqing, Yunnan).

== Subspecies ==
- Oreta hoenei hoenei (China: Heilongjiang, Shanxi, Henan, Shaanxi, Ningxia, Gansu)
- Oreta hoenei inangulata Watson, 1967 (China: Sichuan, Chongqing, Yunnan)
- Oreta hoenei tienia Watson, 1967 (China: Zhejiang, Hubei, Jiangxi, Hunan, Fujian)
