= Oreta eminens =

Scientific classification
- Kingdom: Animalia
- Phylum: Arthropoda
- Class: Insecta
- Order: Lepidoptera
- Family: Drepanidae
- Genus: Oreta
- Species: O. eminens

Binomial name
- Oreta eminens (Bryk, 1943)

Synonyms
- Rhamphoreta eminens Bryk, 1943

Species of hook-tip moth

Oreta eminens is a species of moth of the family Drepanidae first described by Felix Bryk in 1943. It is found in Myanmar, China (Zhejiang, Jiangxi, Hunan, Fujian, Guangxi, Sichuan, Chongqing, Yunnan), Korea and Japan.
