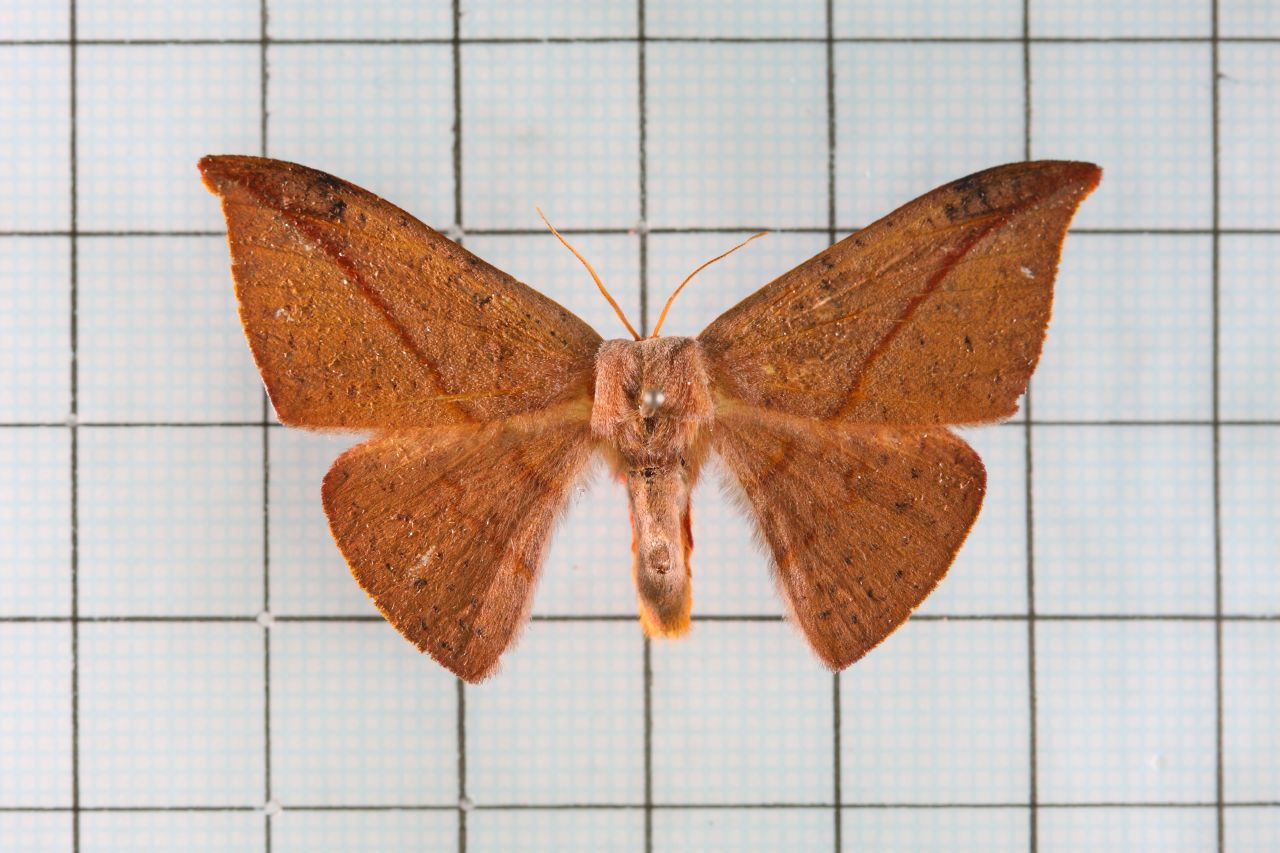

Scientific classification
- Kingdom: Animalia
- Phylum: Arthropoda
- Class: Insecta
- Order: Lepidoptera
- Family: Drepanidae
- Genus: Oreta
- Species: O. insignis

Binomial name
- Oreta insignis (Butler, 1877)

Synonyms
- Hypsomadius insignis Butler, 1877; Hypsomadius insignis ab. formosana Strand, 1916

= Oreta insignis =

Species of hook-tip moth

Oreta insignis is a species of moth of the family Drepanidae. It is found in Taiwan, China (Hubei, Jiangxi, Hunan, Fujian, Guangdong, Hainan, Guangxi, Sichuan, Chongqing, Guizhou, Yunnan, Tibet) and Japan.

The wingspan is 36–44 mm. Adults are on wing in February and April.

The larvae feed on the leaves of Daphniphyllum glaucescens oldhamii var. oldhamii.
