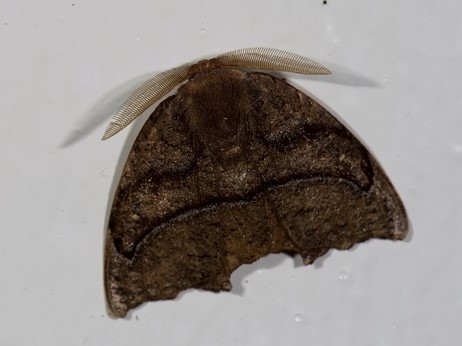

Scientific classification
- Kingdom: Animalia
- Phylum: Arthropoda
- Clade: Pancrustacea
- Class: Insecta
- Order: Lepidoptera
- Family: Drepanidae
- Genus: Neoreta
- Species: N. purpureofascia

Binomial name
- Neoreta purpureofascia (Wileman, 1911)

Synonyms
- Oreta purpureofascia Wileman, 1911; Cyclura purpureofascia; Oreta purpureofascia ab. unicolor Wileman, 1911; Tomocerota formosana Matsumura, 1921; Kosemponiola bipectinata Strand, 1917; Amphitorna purpureofascia (Wileman, 1911)

= Neoreta purpureofascia =

Species of hook-tip moth

Neoreta purpureofascia is a species of moth in the family Drepanidae. It was first described by Wileman in 1911. It is found in Taiwan and China (Hainan).

== Description ==
The wingspan is about 34 mm. The forewings are light brown with reddish-brown ante- and postmedial lines, the latter angled near the costa. The space between the lines is purplish brown, and this colour extends along the inner margin to the base. The hindwings have a purplish-brown basal half, limited by a reddish-brown line. The outer half is light brown.
