= Neoreta trogoptera =

Scientific classification
- Kingdom: Animalia
- Phylum: Arthropoda
- Clade: Pancrustacea
- Class: Insecta
- Order: Lepidoptera
- Family: Drepanidae
- Genus: Neoreta
- Species: N. trogoptera

Binomial name
- Neoreta trogoptera (Rothschild, 1915)

Synonyms
- Oreta trogoptera Rothschild, 1915; Procampsis trogoptera Warren, 1923; Amphitorna trogoptera Rothschild, 1915

Species of moth

Neoreta trogoptera is a species of moth in the family Drepanidae. It was first described by Walter Rothschild in 1915. It is found in West Irian in New Guinea.

== Description ==
The wingspan is about 34 mm. The basal part of the forewings is black brown variegated with buffish cinnamon, while the costal area is buffish cinnamon. There is an oblique brown-black transverse line just beyond the middle of the wing with two dark crimson streaks across its upper end. The outer area is black brown and the apical area and short streaks of varying length running in from the fringe along veins 4, 5, 6 and 7 are buff. There is a small white stigma. The costal area of the hindwings is buffy cinnamon, while the rest of the wing is black brown. An antemedian brown-black line runs in from the abdominal margin to the pale costal area; fringe dark crimson.
