= Neoreta perexcisa =

Scientific classification
- Kingdom: Animalia
- Phylum: Arthropoda
- Clade: Pancrustacea
- Class: Insecta
- Order: Lepidoptera
- Family: Drepanidae
- Genus: Neoreta
- Species: N. perexcisa

Binomial name
- Neoreta perexcisa Warren, 1923

Synonyms
- Amphitorna perexcisa (Warren, 1923)

Species of hook-tip moth

Neoreta perexcisa is species of moth in the family Drepanidae. It was first described by Warren in 1923. It is found in Malaysia and on Borneo, Bali, Java and Sumatra.
