= Eusarca subflavaria =

Scientific classification
- Domain: Eukaryota
- Kingdom: Animalia
- Phylum: Arthropoda
- Class: Insecta
- Order: Lepidoptera
- Family: Geometridae
- Tribe: Ourapterygini
- Genus: Eusarca
- Species: E. subflavaria

Binomial name
- Eusarca subflavaria (Pearsall, 1906)

Synonyms
- Gonodontis subflavaria Pearsall, 1906

Species of moth

Eusarca subflavaria is a species of geometrid moth in the family Geometridae. It is found in North America.

The MONA or Hodges number for Eusarca subflavaria is 6934.
