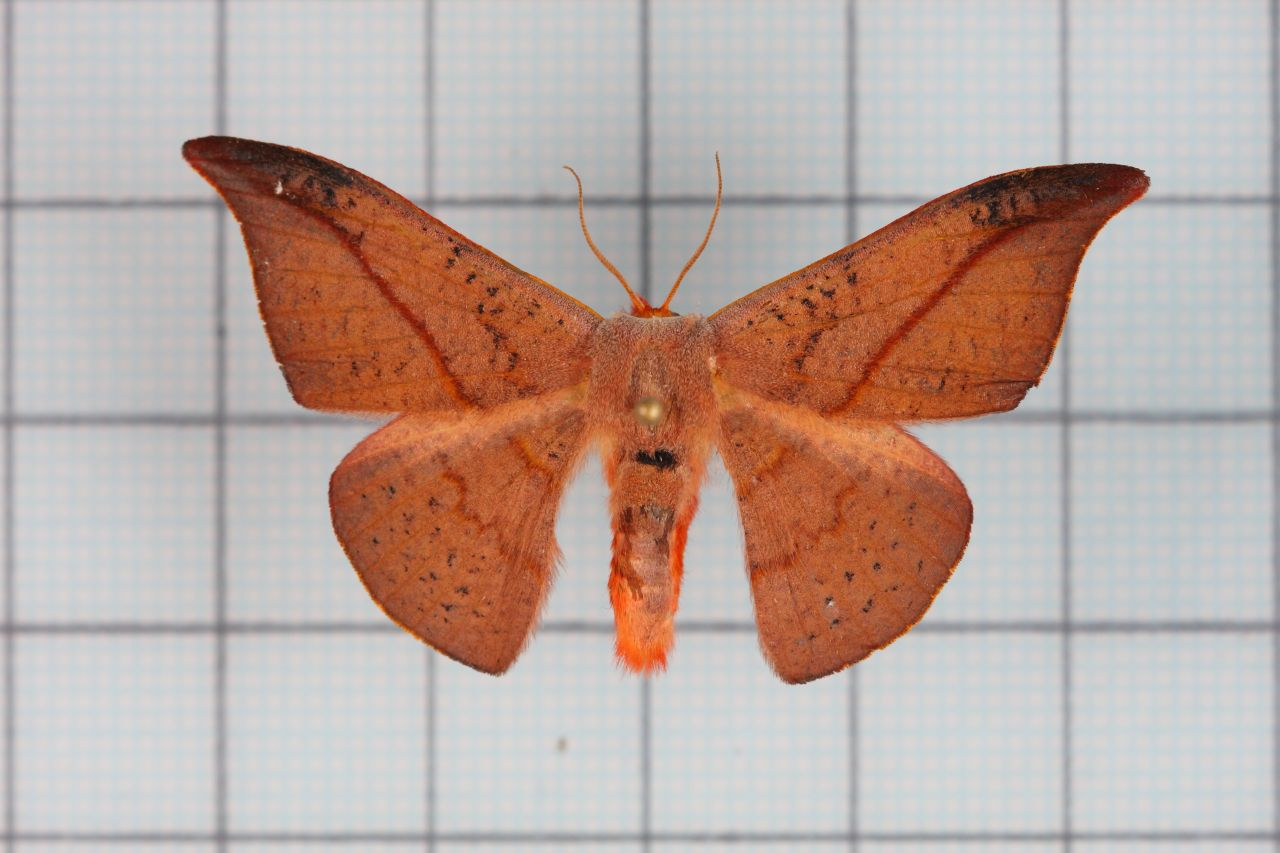
- Oreta brunnea

Scientific classification
- Kingdom: Animalia
- Phylum: Arthropoda
- Class: Insecta
- Order: Lepidoptera
- Family: Drepanidae
- Tribe: Oretini
- Genus: Oreta; Walker, 1855

Synonyms
- Dryopteris Grote, 1862; Hypsomadius Butler, 1877; Holoreta Warren, 1902; Oretella Strand, 1916; Psiloreta Warren, 1923; Mimoreta Matsumura, 1927; Rhamphoreta Bryk, 1943

= Oreta =

Moth genus in family Drepanidae

Oreta is a genus of moths belonging to the subfamily Drepaninae. The genus was erected by Francis Walker in 1855.

== Species ==
- The rosea species group
  - Oreta ancora Chu and Wang, 1987
  - Oreta andrema Wilkinson, 1972
  - Oreta angularis Watson, 1967
  - Oreta brunnea Wileman, 1911
  - Oreta eminens (Bryk, 1943)
  - Oreta flavobrunnea Watson, 1967
  - Oreta hoenei Watson, 1967
  - Oreta liensis Watson, 1967
  - Oreta loochooana Swinhoe, 1902
  - Oreta obtusa Walker, 1855
  - Oreta paki Inoue, 1964
  - Oreta pavaca Moore, [1866]
  - Oreta pulchripes Butler, 1877
  - Oreta rosea (Walker, 1855)
  - Oreta sanguinea Moore, 1879
  - Oreta shania Watson, 1967
  - Oreta speciosa (Bryk, 1943)
  - Oreta trispina Watson, 1967
  - Oreta turpis Butler, 1877
  - Oreta vatama Moore, [1866]
- The insignis species group
  - Oreta ashleyi Holloway, 1998
  - Oreta bicolor Warren, 1897
  - Oreta insignis (Butler, 1877)
  - Oreta perfida Warren, 1923
  - Oreta perobliquilinea Warren, 1923
  - Oreta singapura Swinhoe, 1892
  - Oreta sublustris Warren, 1923
  - Oreta subvinosa Warren, 1903
  - Oreta unilinea (Warren, 1899)
- The extensa species group
  - Oreta extensa Walker, 1855
  - Oreta pingorum Holloway, 1998
  - Oreta roepkei Watson, 1961
  - Oreta suffusa Walker, 1855
- The fuscopurpurea species group
  - Oreta fuscopurpurea Inoue, 1956
- The carnea species group
  - Oreta carnea (Butler, 1892)
  - Oreta griseotincta Hampson, 1893
  - Oreta identata Watson, 1961
  - Oreta jaspidea (Warren, 1896)
  - Oreta rubrifumata Warren, 1923
- The rubromarginata species group
  - Oreta bilineata H.F. Chu & L.Y. Wang, 1987
  - Oreta fulgens (Warren, 1899)
  - Oreta rubromarginata Swinhoe, 1902
  - Oreta sambongsana Park, M. Y. Kim, Y. D. Kwon & E. M. Ji, 2011
- unknown species group
  - Oreta inflativalva Song, Xue & Han, 2012
  - Oreta miltodes Lower, 1903
  - Oreta trispinuligera Chen, 1985

== Former species ==
- Oreta ankyra Chu & Wang Chu & Wang, 1987
- Oreta calida Butler, 1877
- Oreta dalia H.F. Chu & L.Y. Wang, 1987
- Oreta fusca H.H. Chu & L.Y. Wang, 1987
- Oreta hyalina H.H. Chu & L.Y. Wang, 1987
- Oreta lushansis Fang
- Oreta trianga H.F. Chu & L.Y. Wang, 1987
- Oreta unichroma H.H. Chu & L.Y. Wang, 1987
- Oreta zigzaga H.F. Chu & L.Y. Wang, 1987
