= Oreta ancora =

Scientific classification
- Domain: Eukaryota
- Kingdom: Animalia
- Phylum: Arthropoda
- Class: Insecta
- Order: Lepidoptera
- Family: Drepanidae
- Genus: Oreta
- Species: O. ancora

Binomial name
- Oreta ancora Chu and Wang, 1987

Species of hook-tip moth

Oreta ancora is a moth in the family Drepanidae. It was described by Hong-Fu Chu and Lin-Yao Wang in 1987. It is found in China (Sichuan, Tibet) and Nepal.

The length of the forewings is 16–19 mm.
