= Oreta trispinuligera =

Scientific classification
- Domain: Eukaryota
- Kingdom: Animalia
- Phylum: Arthropoda
- Class: Insecta
- Order: Lepidoptera
- Family: Drepanidae
- Genus: Oreta
- Species: O. trispinuligera

Binomial name
- Oreta trispinuligera Chen, 1985

Synonyms
- Oreta ankyra Chu & Wang Chu & Wang, 1987

Species of hook-tip moth

Oreta trispinuligera is a moth in the family Drepanidae. It was described by X.Y. Chen in 1985. It is found in China (Henan, Shaanxi, Gansu, Hubei, Fujian, Guangxi, Sichuan, Chongqing, Yunnan).
