= Oreta ashleyi =

Scientific classification
- Kingdom: Animalia
- Phylum: Arthropoda
- Clade: Pancrustacea
- Class: Insecta
- Order: Lepidoptera
- Family: Drepanidae
- Genus: Oreta
- Species: O. ashleyi

Binomial name
- Oreta ashleyi Holloway, 1998

Species of hook-tip moth

Oreta ashleyi is a moth in the family Drepanidae. It was described by Jeremy Daniel Holloway in 1998. It is found on Borneo.
