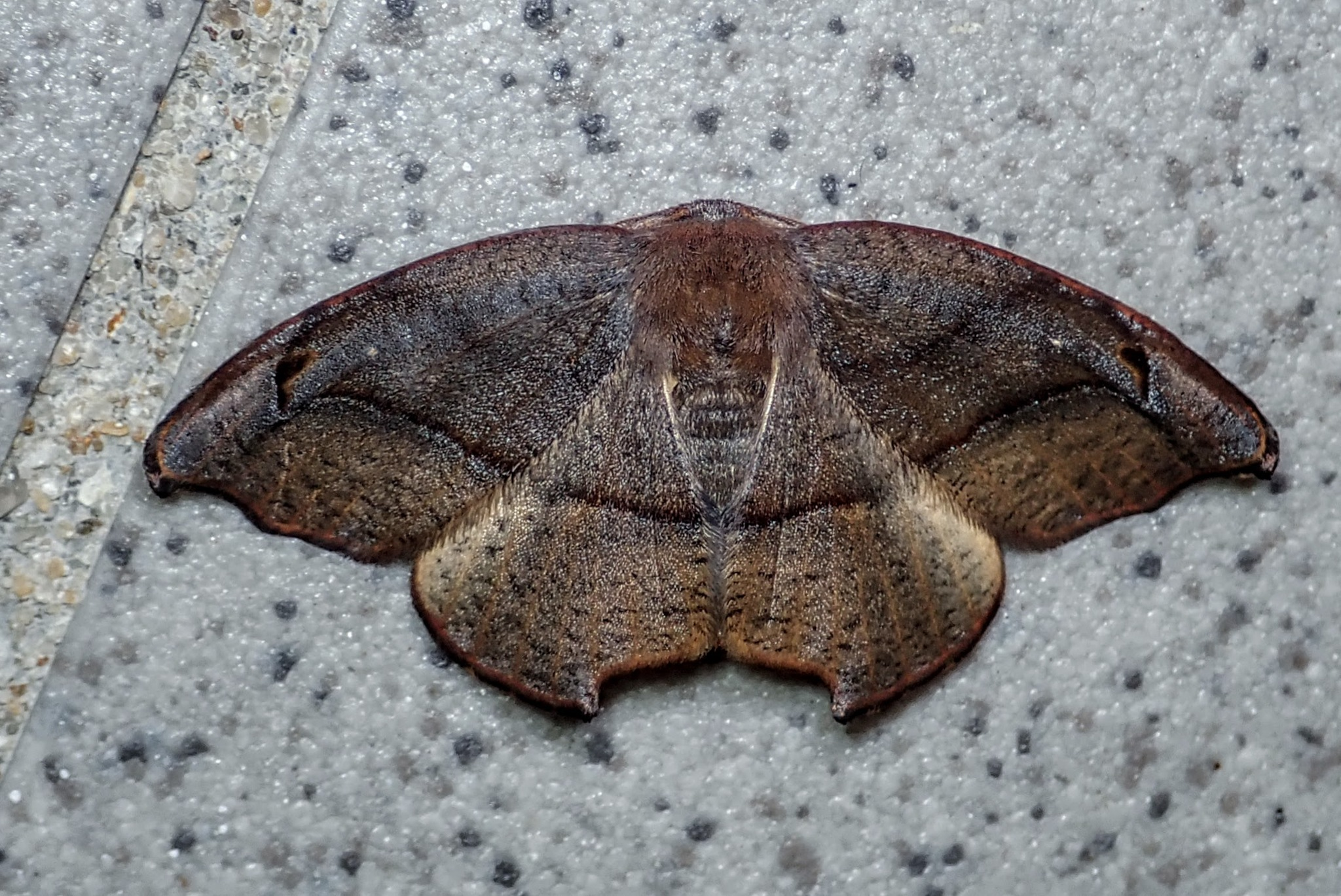

Scientific classification
- Kingdom: Animalia
- Phylum: Arthropoda
- Clade: Pancrustacea
- Class: Insecta
- Order: Lepidoptera
- Family: Drepanidae
- Genus: Neoreta
- Species: N. olga

Binomial name
- Neoreta olga (Swinhoe, 1894)

Synonyms
- Oreta olga Swinhoe, 1894; Amphitorna olga (Swinhoe, 1894); Cyclura olga (Swinhoe, 1894)

= Neoreta olga =

Species of hook-tip moth

Neoreta olga is a species of moth in the family Drepanidae. It was first described by Charles Swinhoe in 1894. It is found in Northeast India, Nepal, and China (Jiangxi, Fujian, Guangdong, Sichuan, Yunnan).

== Description ==
The wingspan is 38 mm (1 1/2 in). Adults are brown, tinged with yellow, sparsely striated with brown. The forewings have a slight white smear below the apex and both wings are crossed by a brown medial curved line, outwardly marked with ochreous grey, this line is sharply bent inwards below the costa of the forewings, and is angled outwards above the middle in the hindwings.
