= Oreta roepkei =

Scientific classification
- Domain: Eukaryota
- Kingdom: Animalia
- Phylum: Arthropoda
- Class: Insecta
- Order: Lepidoptera
- Family: Drepanidae
- Genus: Oreta
- Species: O. roepkei

Binomial name
- Oreta roepkei Watson, 1961

Species of hook-tip moth

Oreta roepkei is a moth in the family Drepanidae. It was described by Watson in 1961. It is found in Java, Indonesia.
