= Eusarca geniculata =

Scientific classification
- Kingdom: Animalia
- Phylum: Arthropoda
- Class: Insecta
- Order: Lepidoptera
- Family: Geometridae
- Genus: Eusarca
- Species: E. geniculata

Binomial name
- Eusarca geniculata (Hulst, 1886)

Synonyms
- Tetracis geniculata Hulst, 1886

Species of moth

Eusarca geniculata is a species of geometrid moth in the family Geometridae. It is found in North America.

The MONA or Hodges number for Eusarca geniculata is 6939.
