= Oreta sanguinea =

Scientific classification
- Domain: Eukaryota
- Kingdom: Animalia
- Phylum: Arthropoda
- Class: Insecta
- Order: Lepidoptera
- Family: Drepanidae
- Genus: Oreta
- Species: O. sanguinea

Binomial name
- Oreta sanguinea Moore, 1879

Synonyms
- Psiloreta sanguinea

Species of hook-tip moth

Oreta sanguinea is a moth in the family Drepanidae. It was described by Frederic Moore in 1879. It is found in north-eastern India, Sikkim and Tibet.
