= Oreta bilineata =

Scientific classification
- Domain: Eukaryota
- Kingdom: Animalia
- Phylum: Arthropoda
- Class: Insecta
- Order: Lepidoptera
- Family: Drepanidae
- Genus: Oreta
- Species: O. bilineata

Binomial name
- Oreta bilineata Chu and Wang, 1987

Species of hook-tip moth

Oreta bilineata is a moth in the family Drepanidae. It was described by Hong-Fu Chu and Lin-Yao Wang in 1987. It is found in Sichuan, China.

The length of the forewings is 18–20 mm. Adults can be distinguished from related species by the dark forewings with two oblique lines.
