= Oreta shania =

Scientific classification
- Domain: Eukaryota
- Kingdom: Animalia
- Phylum: Arthropoda
- Class: Insecta
- Order: Lepidoptera
- Family: Drepanidae
- Genus: Oreta
- Species: O. shania

Binomial name
- Oreta shania Watson, 1967

Synonyms
- Oreta bimaculata H.F. Chu & L.Y. Wang, 1987; Oreta cera H.F. Chu & L.Y. Wang, 1987

Species of hook-tip moth

Oreta shania is a moth in the family Drepanidae. It was described by Watson in 1967. It is found in China (Zhejiang, Fujian, Sichuan).
