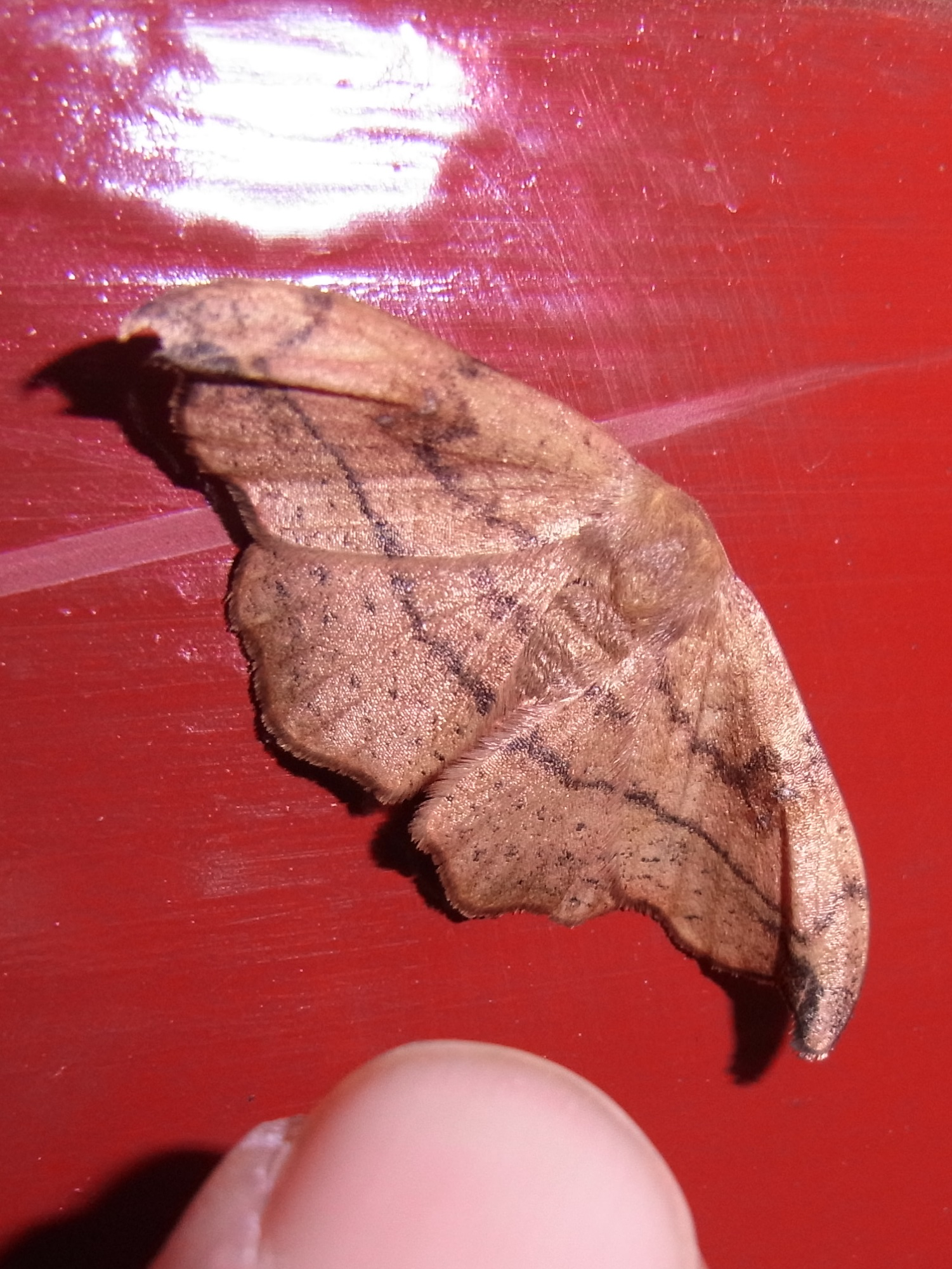

Scientific classification
- Domain: Eukaryota
- Kingdom: Animalia
- Phylum: Arthropoda
- Class: Insecta
- Order: Lepidoptera
- Family: Drepanidae
- Genus: Oreta
- Species: O. turpis

Binomial name
- Oreta turpis Butler, 1877

Synonyms
- Oreta calida Butler, 1877

= Oreta turpis =

Species of hook-tip moth

Oreta turpis is a moth in the family Drepanidae. It was described by Arthur Gardiner Butler in 1877. It is found in Japan, the Russian Far East (Sakhalin, Ussuri), Korea and China (Shandong).

The wingspan is 30–40 mm. Adults are pale shining brown, the external area sprinkled with black, the forewings are crossed by two parallel greyish lines, which become blackish towards the apex. There is a short apical streak between the outer line and the margin. The hindwings have a pale costal area and the apical area is darker than the rest of the wing.
