= Oreta pulchripes =

Scientific classification
- Domain: Eukaryota
- Kingdom: Animalia
- Phylum: Arthropoda
- Class: Insecta
- Order: Lepidoptera
- Family: Drepanidae
- Genus: Oreta
- Species: O. pulchripes

Binomial name
- Oreta pulchripes Butler, 1877

Synonyms
- Oreta calceolaria Butler, 1877; Oreta auripes Butler, 1879; Oreta thermidora Hampson, 1914; Oreta pulchripes chosenoreta Bryk, 1949

Species of hook-tip moth

Oreta pulchripes is a moth in the family Drepanidae. It was described by Arthur Gardiner Butler in 1877. It is found in China (Jilin), Japan, south-eastern Russia and Korea.

The wingspan is 30–35 mm. Adults are dirty reddish yellow, the wings bordered and clouded with rosy lilacine and margined with ferruginous, mottled and striated with grey. The forewings have two or three costal spots and one blackish near the external angle, crossed by two oblique irregular grey lines. The outer one bordered externally by a bright yellow line, terminating in an ochreous patch near the apex. There is a large ferruginous spot at the end of the cell.
