= Neoreta albipuncta =

Scientific classification
- Kingdom: Animalia
- Phylum: Arthropoda
- Clade: Pancrustacea
- Class: Insecta
- Order: Lepidoptera
- Family: Drepanidae
- Genus: Neoreta
- Species: N. albipuncta

Binomial name
- Neoreta albipuncta (Hampson, 1893)

Synonyms
- Oreta albipuncta Hampson, [1893]; Psiloreta albipuncta (Hampson, 1893); Amphitorna albipuncta (Hampson, 1893)

Species of hook-tip moth

Neoreta albipuncta is a species of moth in the family Drepanidae. It was first described in 1893 by George Hampson. It is found in Sri Lanka.

== Description ==
The wingspan is about 26 mm. Male with thickened antennae and flattened by the coalescing of the serrations. Adults are ochraceous chestnut, with numerous black strigae, the forewings with an indistinct medial inwardly-oblique darker band and a white spot at the end of the cell. There is a postmedial band with a pale outer edge, angled below the costa, as well as an indistinct subapical dusky patch. The hindwings have a pale costal area and a medial oblique pale-edged band continuous with the postmedial band of the forewings, and not continued across the pale costal area.
