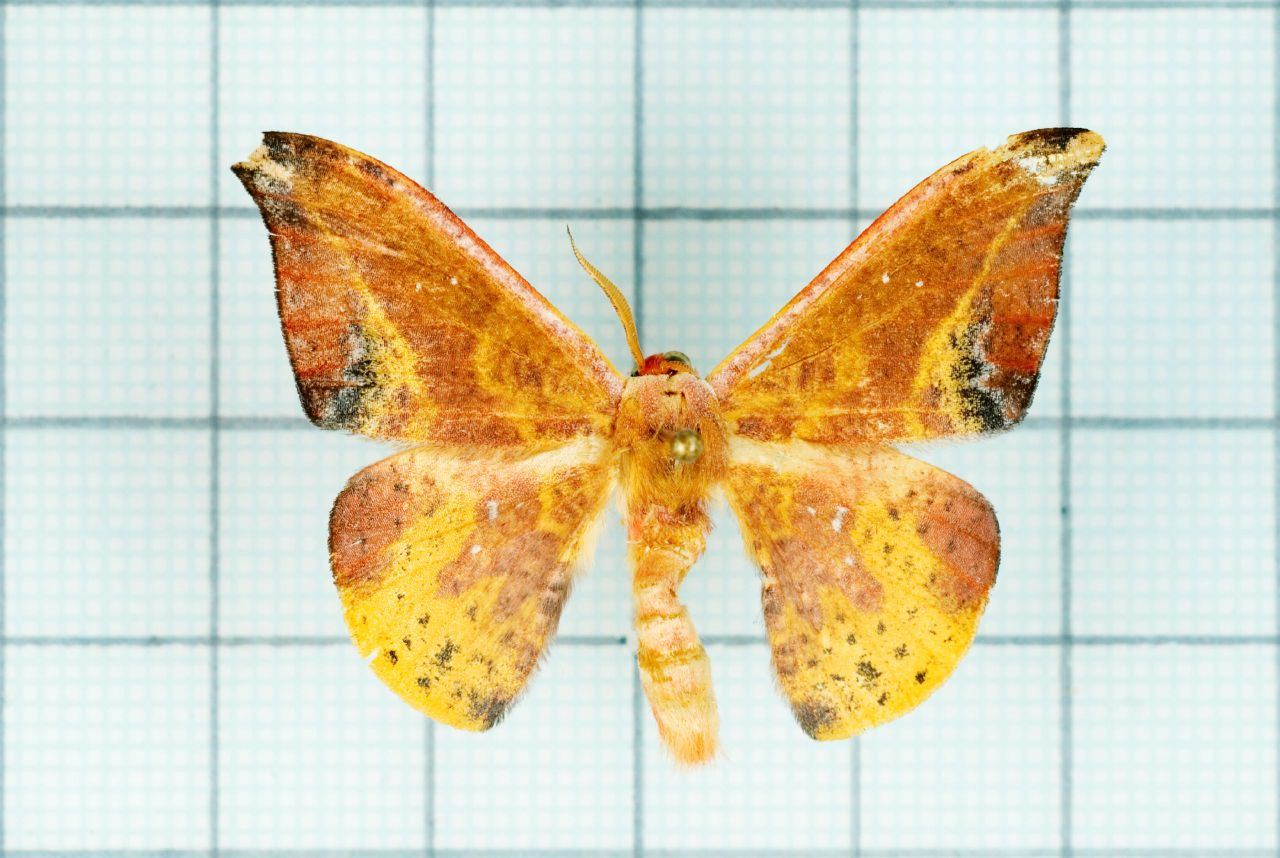

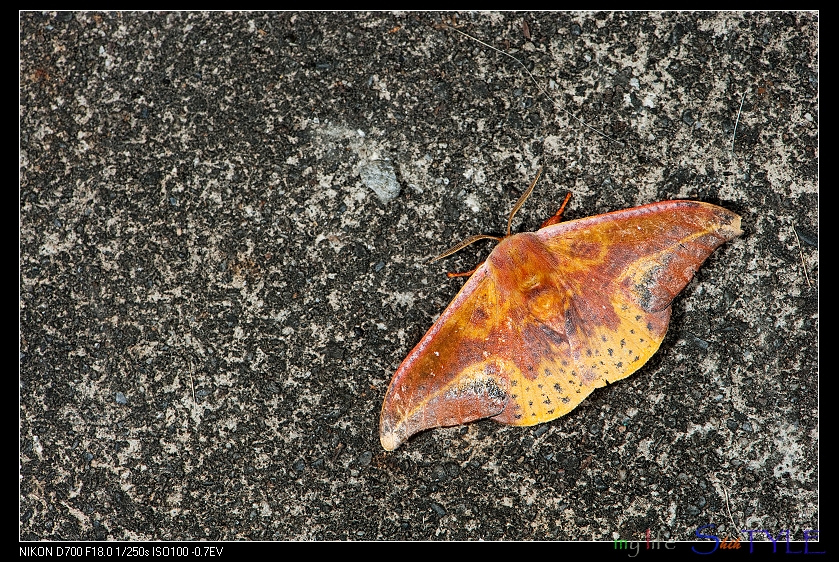

Scientific classification
- Kingdom: Animalia
- Phylum: Arthropoda
- Class: Insecta
- Order: Lepidoptera
- Family: Drepanidae
- Genus: Oreta
- Species: O. fuscopurpurea

Binomial name
- Oreta fuscopurpurea Inoue, 1956

Synonyms
- Oreta extensa ab. fusco-purpurea Matsumura, 1927; Oreta extensa fuscopurpurea Inoue, 1956; Oreta purpurea Inoue, 1961

= Oreta fuscopurpurea =

Species of hook-tip moth

Oreta fuscopurpurea is a species of moth of the family Drepanidae. It is found in Taiwan, China (Zhejiang, Hubei, Jiangxi, Hunan, Fujian, Guangdong, Hainan, Guangxi, Sichuan, Chongqing) and Japan.

The wingspan is 35–43 mm. Adults are on wing in January.
