= Oreta sambongsana =

Scientific classification
- Kingdom: Animalia
- Phylum: Arthropoda
- Class: Insecta
- Order: Lepidoptera
- Family: Drepanidae
- Genus: Oreta
- Species: O. sambongsana

Binomial name
- Oreta sambongsana Park, M. Kim, Y.-D. Kwon & E.-M. Ji, 2011

Species of hook-tip moth

Oreta sambongsana is a moth in the family Drepanidae. It was described by Kyu-Tek Park, Minyoung Kim, Young-Dae Kwon and Eun-Mi Ji in 2011. It is found in Korea.
