= Oreta trispina =

Scientific classification
- Kingdom: Animalia
- Phylum: Arthropoda
- Class: Insecta
- Order: Lepidoptera
- Family: Drepanidae
- Genus: Oreta
- Species: O. trispina

Binomial name
- Oreta trispina Watson, 1967

Species of hook-tip moth

Oreta trispina is a moth in the family Drepanidae. It was described by Watson in 1967. It is found in China (Shaanxi, Ningxia, Gansu, Sichuan).
