= Oreta miltodes =

Scientific classification
- Kingdom: Animalia
- Phylum: Arthropoda
- Class: Insecta
- Order: Lepidoptera
- Family: Drepanidae
- Genus: Oreta
- Species: O. miltodes

Binomial name
- Oreta miltodes Lower, 1903

Species of hook-tip moth

"Oreta" miltodes is a moth in the family Drepanidae. It was described by Oswald Bertram Lower in 1903. It is found in Australia, where it has been recorded from Queensland.

The Global Lepidoptera Names Index has this name as a synonym of Oreta jaspidea.

The wingspan is about 34 mm. The forewings are pale ochreous fuscous, strongly suffused with carmine pink, especially on the terminal area, where it becomes wholly carmine pink. There is a fuscous moderately broad antemedian shade, followed by a similar shade in the middle and there is a nearly straight rather narrower shade from the costa at three-fourths to the inner margin at about three-fourths. The hindwings have the same colour as the forewings and a subterminal streak as in the forewings. The costa is broadly grey whitish.
