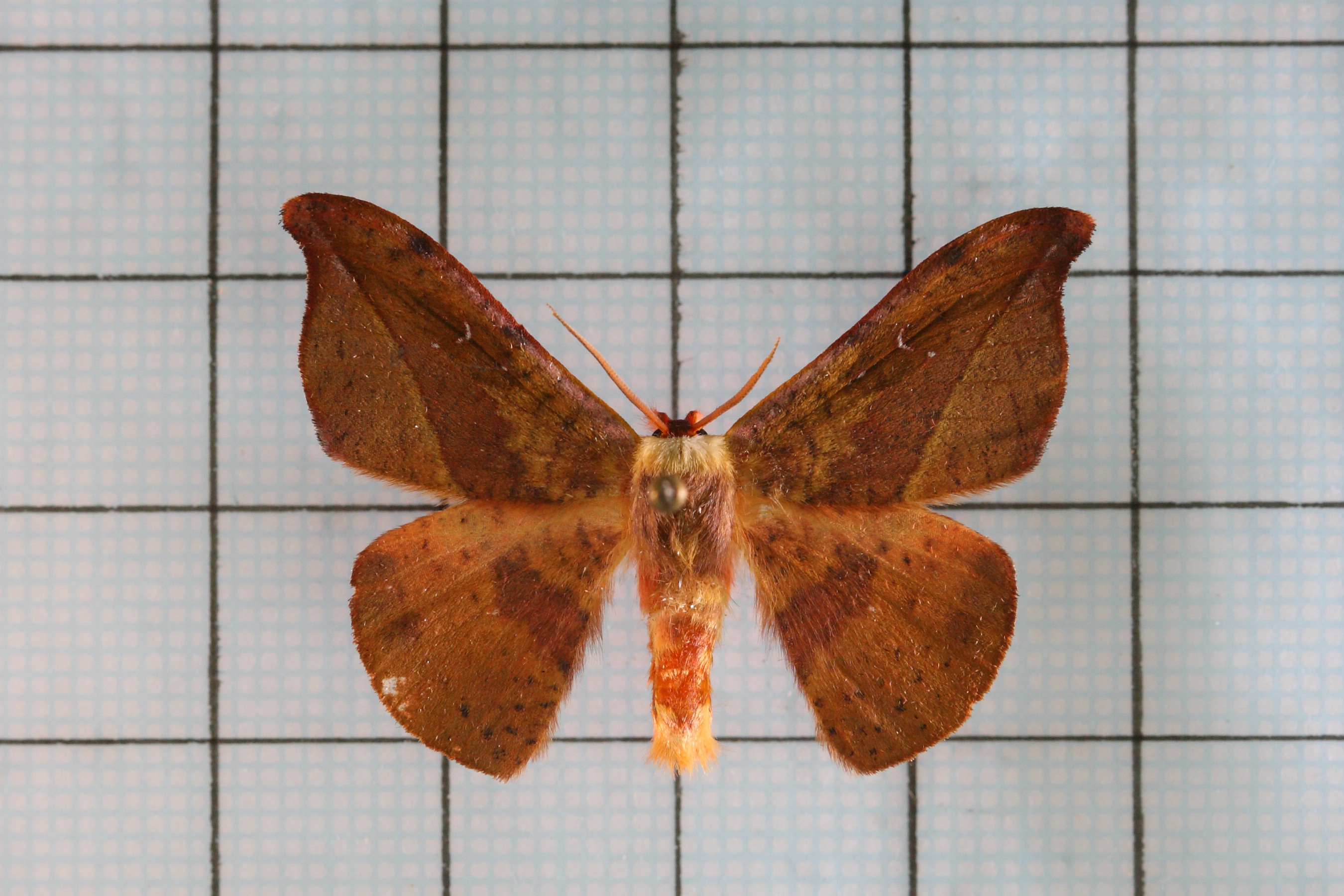
- Male
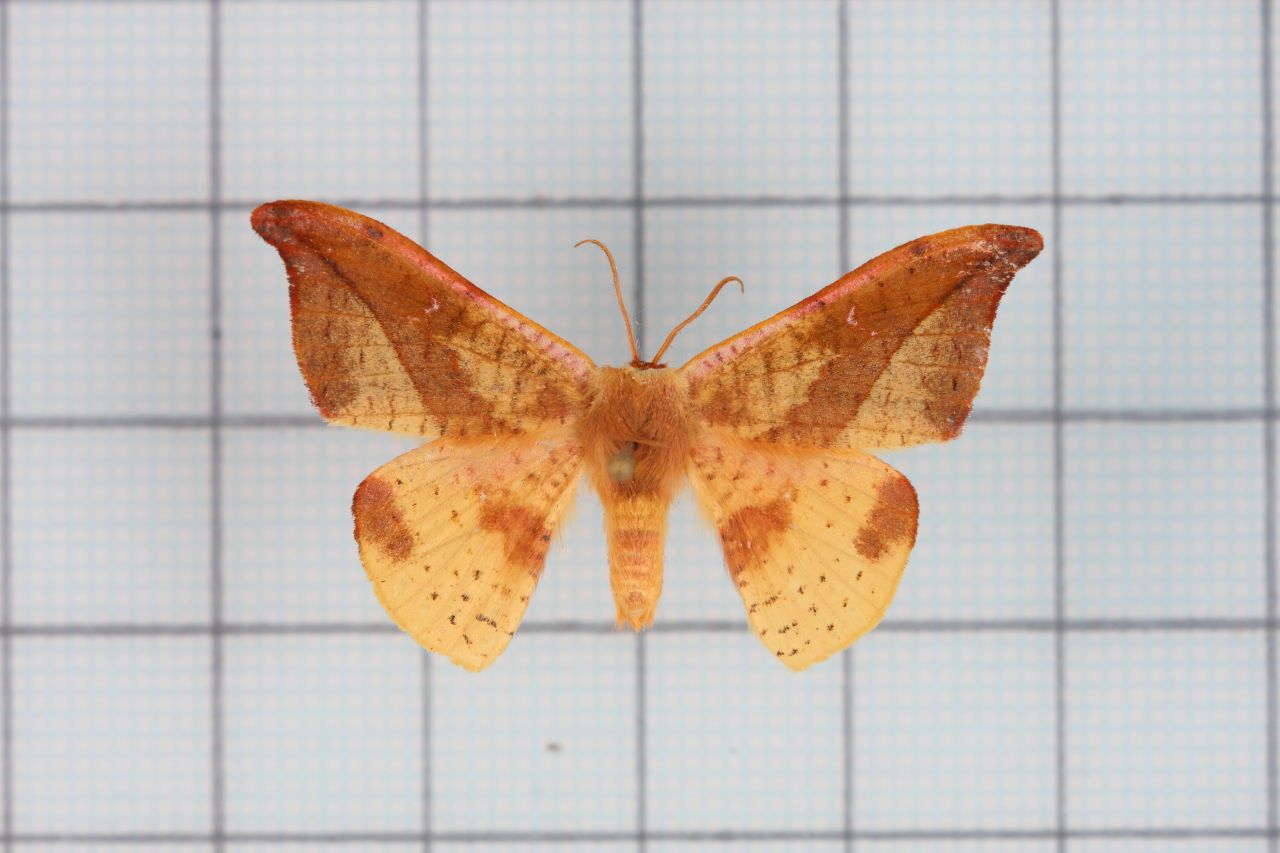
- Female

Scientific classification
- Kingdom: Animalia
- Phylum: Arthropoda
- Class: Insecta
- Order: Lepidoptera
- Family: Drepanidae
- Genus: Oreta
- Species: O. extensa

Binomial name
- Oreta extensa Walker, 1855

Synonyms
- Oreta adona Strecker; Oreta figlina Swinhoe, 1905

= Oreta extensa =

Species of hook-tip moth

Oreta extensa is a species of moth of the family Drepanidae described by Francis Walker in 1855. It is found in China (Fujian, Guangdong, Hainan, Yunnan), Taiwan, India, Sri Lanka, Indonesia and Thailand.

== Description ==
The wingspan is 33–38 mm. Adults are on wing in June. Palpi minute. Mid and hind tibia lack spurs. Antennae with serrations not coalescing. Head and legs are bright orange or scarlet. Thorax and abdomen yellowish with a pink tinge. Both wings yellow suffused with pinkish brown, sometimes uniformly, but generally the basal area of forewing and the whole outer area of hindwing, except the apex, is not suffused. Both wings with numerous small, dark evenly distributed and more or less prominent spots, and two white specks on the discocellulars are present. Forewing with a yellow oblique line from the apex to inner margin beyond the middle, and a fuscous spot at outer angle. Larva spins a cocoon in a rolled up leaf.
