= Hypsidia =

Scientific classification
- Domain: Eukaryota
- Kingdom: Animalia
- Phylum: Arthropoda
- Class: Insecta
- Order: Lepidoptera
- Family: Drepanidae
- Subfamily: Thyatirinae
- Genus: Hypsidia; Rothschild, 1896

Synonyms
- Baryphanes Turner, 1933; Eggersia Sick, 1938; Eggersops D. S. Fletcher, 1979

Moth genus in family Drepanidae

Hypsidia is a genus of moths belonging to the subfamily Thyatirinae of the Drepanidae. It was described by Walter Rothschild in 1896.

== Species ==
- The niphosema species group
  - Hypsidia australica (Sick, 1938)
  - Hypsidia grisea Scoble & Edwards, 1988
  - Hypsidia microspila (Turner, 1942)
  - Hypsidia niphosema (Lower, 1908)
- The erythropsalis species group
  - Hypsidia erythropsalis Rothschild, 1896
  - Hypsidia robinsoni Hacobian, 1986
