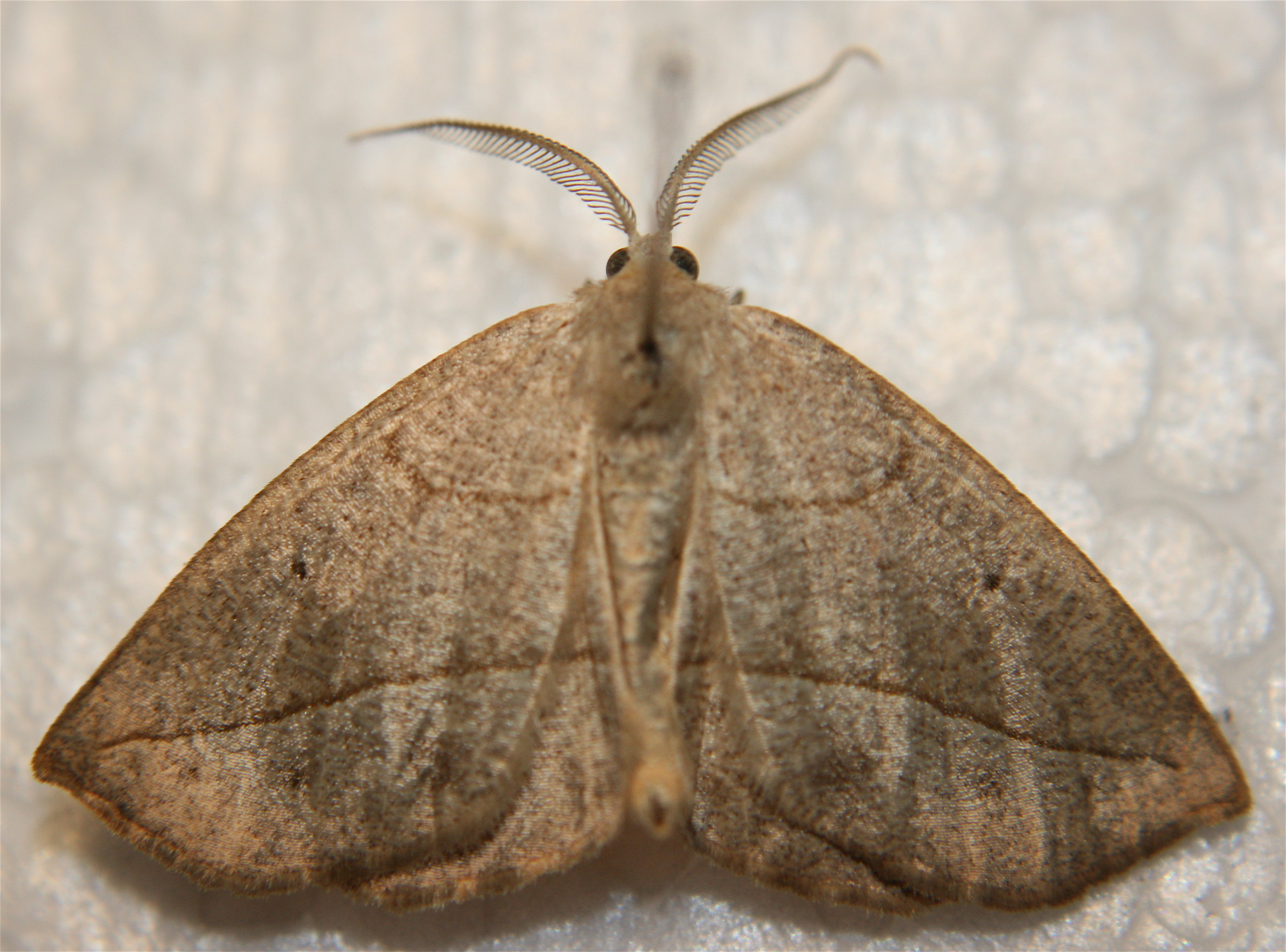
- Eusarca confusaria

Scientific classification
- Kingdom: Animalia
- Phylum: Arthropoda
- Clade: Pancrustacea
- Class: Insecta
- Order: Lepidoptera
- Family: Geometridae
- Subfamily: Ennominae
- Tribe: Ourapterygini
- Genus: Eusarca; Hübner, [1813]

Synonyms
- Eudalimia Hübner, 1821; Caberodes Guenée, 1857; Apicia Guenée, 1857; Brachysema Warren, 1895

= Eusarca =

Genus of moths

Eusarca is a genus of moths in the family Geometridae described by Jacob Hübner in 1813.

== Species ==
The following species are classified in the genus. This species list may be incomplete.

- Eusarca argillaria
- Eusarca confusaria – confused eusarca moth
- Eusarca detractaria
- Eusarca distycharia
- Eusarca falcata
- Eusarca fundaria – dark-edged eusarca moth
- Eusarca galbanaria
- Eusarca geniculata
- Eusarca graceiaria
- Eusarca lutzi
- Eusarca packardaria – Packard's eusarca moth
- Eusarca subcineraria
- Eusarca subflavaria
- Eusarca terraria
- Eusarca tibiaria
- Eusarca venosaria

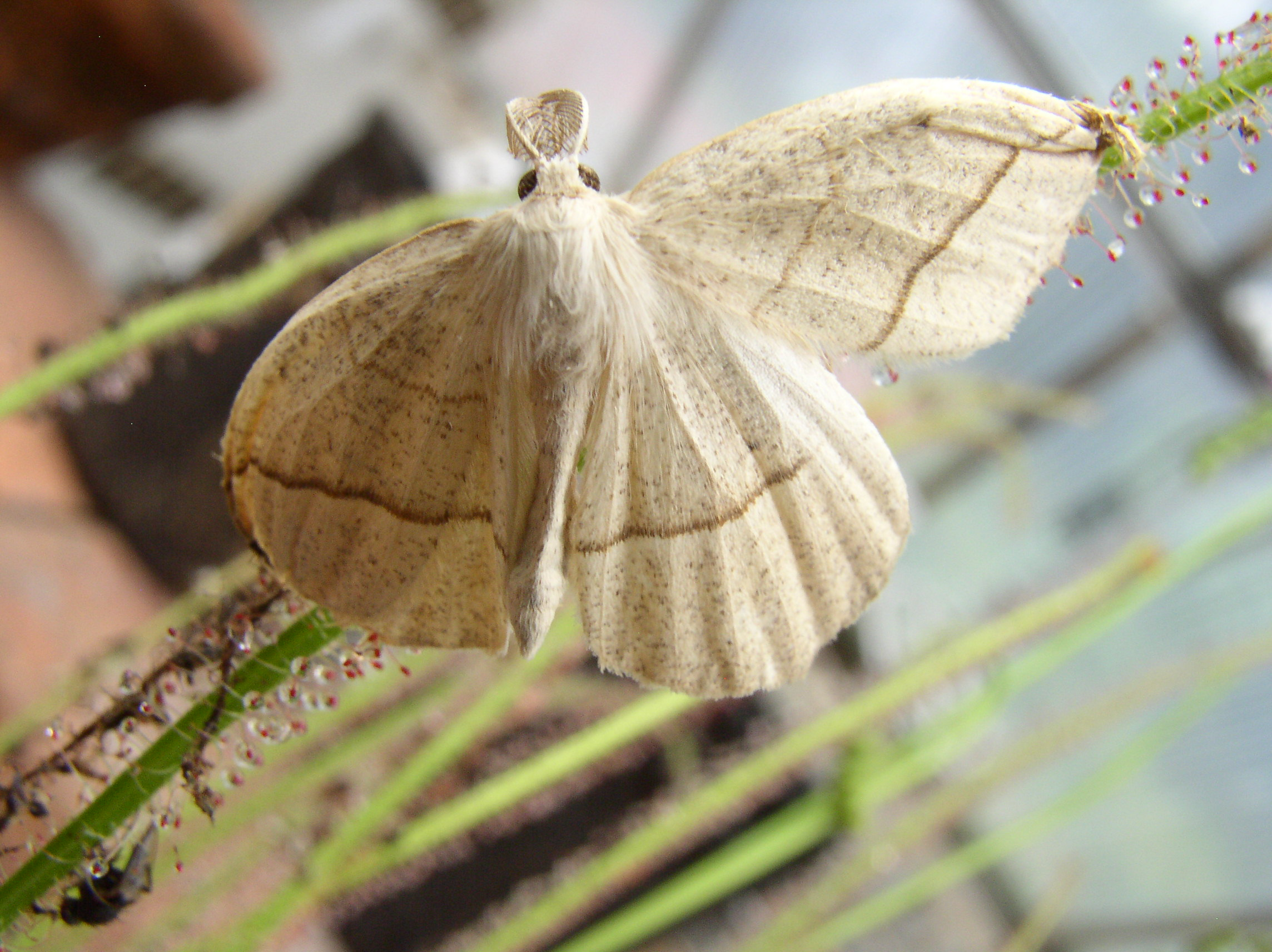
Eusarca confusaria caught by sundew, Drosera filiformis.
