= Oreta speciosa =

Scientific classification
- Kingdom: Animalia
- Phylum: Arthropoda
- Class: Insecta
- Order: Lepidoptera
- Family: Drepanidae
- Genus: Oreta
- Species: O. speciosa

Binomial name
- Oreta speciosa (Bryk, 1943)

Synonyms
- Psiloreta speciosa Bryk, 1943; Psiloreta obtusa speciosa; Oreta obtusa speciosa; Oreta hyalina H.F. Chu & L.Y. Wang, 1987

Species of hook-tip moth

Oreta speciosa is a moth in the family Drepanidae. It was described by Felix Bryk in 1943. It is found in China (Henan, Hubei, Fujian, Sichuan, Tibet) and Myanmar.
