= Oreta pingorum =

Scientific classification
- Kingdom: Animalia
- Phylum: Arthropoda
- Clade: Pancrustacea
- Class: Insecta
- Order: Lepidoptera
- Family: Drepanidae
- Genus: Oreta
- Species: O. pingorum

Binomial name
- Oreta pingorum Holloway, 1998

Species of hook-tip moth

Oreta pingorum is a moth in the family Drepanidae. It was described by Jeremy Daniel Holloway in 1998. It is found on Borneo, Sulawesi, Buru and on New Guinea.
