= Eusarca venosaria =

Scientific classification
- Domain: Eukaryota
- Kingdom: Animalia
- Phylum: Arthropoda
- Class: Insecta
- Order: Lepidoptera
- Family: Geometridae
- Genus: Eusarca
- Species: E. venosaria

Binomial name
- Eusarca venosaria (McDunnough, 1940)

Synonyms
- Apicia venosaria McDunnough, 1940

Species of moth

Eusarca venosaria is a species of geometrid moth in the family Geometridae.

The MONA or Hodges number for Eusarca venosaria is 6937.
