= Oreta inflativalva =

Scientific classification
- Kingdom: Animalia
- Phylum: Arthropoda
- Class: Insecta
- Order: Lepidoptera
- Family: Drepanidae
- Genus: Oreta
- Species: O. inflativalva

Binomial name
- Oreta inflativalva Song, Xue & Han, 2012

Species of hook-tip moth

Oreta inflativalva is a moth in the family Drepanidae. It was described by Song, Xue and Han in 2012. It is found in China (Hainan).

The length of the forewings is 15.5–17 mm.
