= Neoreta submontana =

Scientific classification
- Kingdom: Animalia
- Phylum: Arthropoda
- Clade: Pancrustacea
- Class: Insecta
- Order: Lepidoptera
- Family: Drepanidae
- Genus: Neoreta
- Species: N. submontana

Binomial name
- Neoreta submontana (Holloway, 1976)

Synonyms
- Cyclura submontana Holloway, 1976; Amphitorna submontana (Holloway, 1976)

Species of hook-tip moth

Neoreta submontana is a species of moth in the family Drepanidae. It was first described by Jeremy Daniel Holloway in 1976. It is found on Borneo, where it has been recorded from the lowlands of Brunei, as well as at altitudes of about 1,600 meters on the slopes of Mount Kinabalu.
