= Oreta bicolor =

Scientific classification
- Domain: Eukaryota
- Kingdom: Animalia
- Phylum: Arthropoda
- Class: Insecta
- Order: Lepidoptera
- Family: Drepanidae
- Genus: Oreta
- Species: O. bicolor

Binomial name
- Oreta bicolor Warren, 1897

Species of hook-tip moth

Oreta bicolor is a moth in the family Drepanidae. It was described by William Warren in 1897. It is found in Sundaland and Malaysia.

The wingspan is about 44 mm. The forewings are greyish brown, with fuscous irroration (sprinkling) toward the costa in the outer half of the wing. The veins are paler and there is a red and yellow oblique streak from the inner margin beyond the middle, slightly curved into the apex. The marginal area has a few dark specks and the inner margin is slightly paler. The hindwings have an ochreous costa, merging into reddish. The rest of the wing is brown with traces of submarginal lines of dark specks. The cell-marks of both wings are angular.
