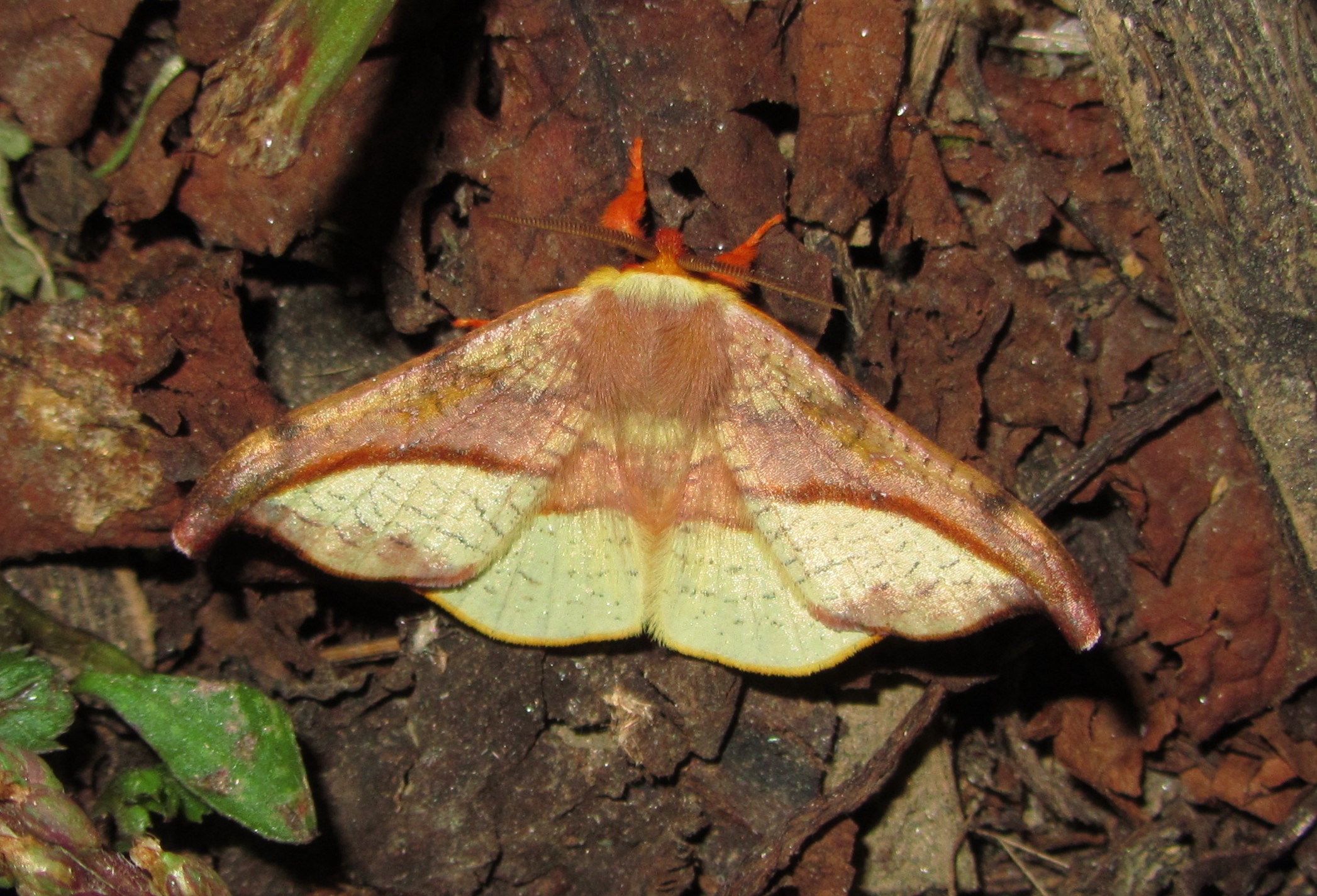
- Oreta pavaca

Scientific classification
- Kingdom: Animalia
- Phylum: Arthropoda
- Class: Insecta
- Order: Lepidoptera
- Family: Drepanidae
- Genus: Oreta
- Species: O. pavaca

Binomial name
- Oreta pavaca Moore, [1866]

Synonyms
- Psiloreta pavaca purpurea Warren, 1923; Psiloreta pavaca olivacea Warren, 1923; Oreta pavaca ab. flavida Warren, 1923; Oreta fusca H.H. Chu & L.Y. Wang, 1987; Oreta lushansis Fang, 2003; Oreta unichroma H.H. Chu & L.Y. Wang, 1987; Oreta zigzaga H.F. Chu & L.Y. Wang, 1987

= Oreta pavaca =

Species of hook-tip moth

Oreta pavaca is a species of moth of the family Drepanidae first described by Frederic Moore in 1866. It is found in China, India and Nepal.

The length of the forewings is 18.5–25.5 mm for males and 21.5–26.5 mm for females.

== Subspecies ==
- Oreta pavaca pavaca (northern India, Sikkim, Nepal, China: Yunnan, Tibet)
- Oreta pavaca sinensis Watson, 1967 (China: Zhejiang, Hubei, Jiangxi, Hunan, Fujian, Guangdong, Guangxi, Sichuan, Chongqing, Guizhou)
