= Neoreta confusata =

Scientific classification
- Kingdom: Animalia
- Phylum: Arthropoda
- Clade: Pancrustacea
- Class: Insecta
- Order: Lepidoptera
- Family: Drepanidae
- Genus: Neoreta
- Species: N. confusata

Binomial name
- Neoreta confusata (Warren, 1899)

Synonyms
- Amphitorna confusata (Warren, 1899); Cyclura confusata Warren, 1899

Species of hook-tip moth

Neoreta confusata is a species of moth in the family Drepanidae. It was first described by Warren in 1899. It is found in the Obi Islands of Indonesia.

== Description ==
The wingspan is about 39 mm. The forewings are greyish-liver colour, tinged with glossy lilac. The costal area is paler. The whole wing is crossed by numerous irregularly waved blackish lines, arranged in pairs and forming indistinct fasciae. There are tawny patches beyond and below the cell, and above the anal angle. The hindwings are similar, but the whole marginal area is tawny, with the black lines thickened.
