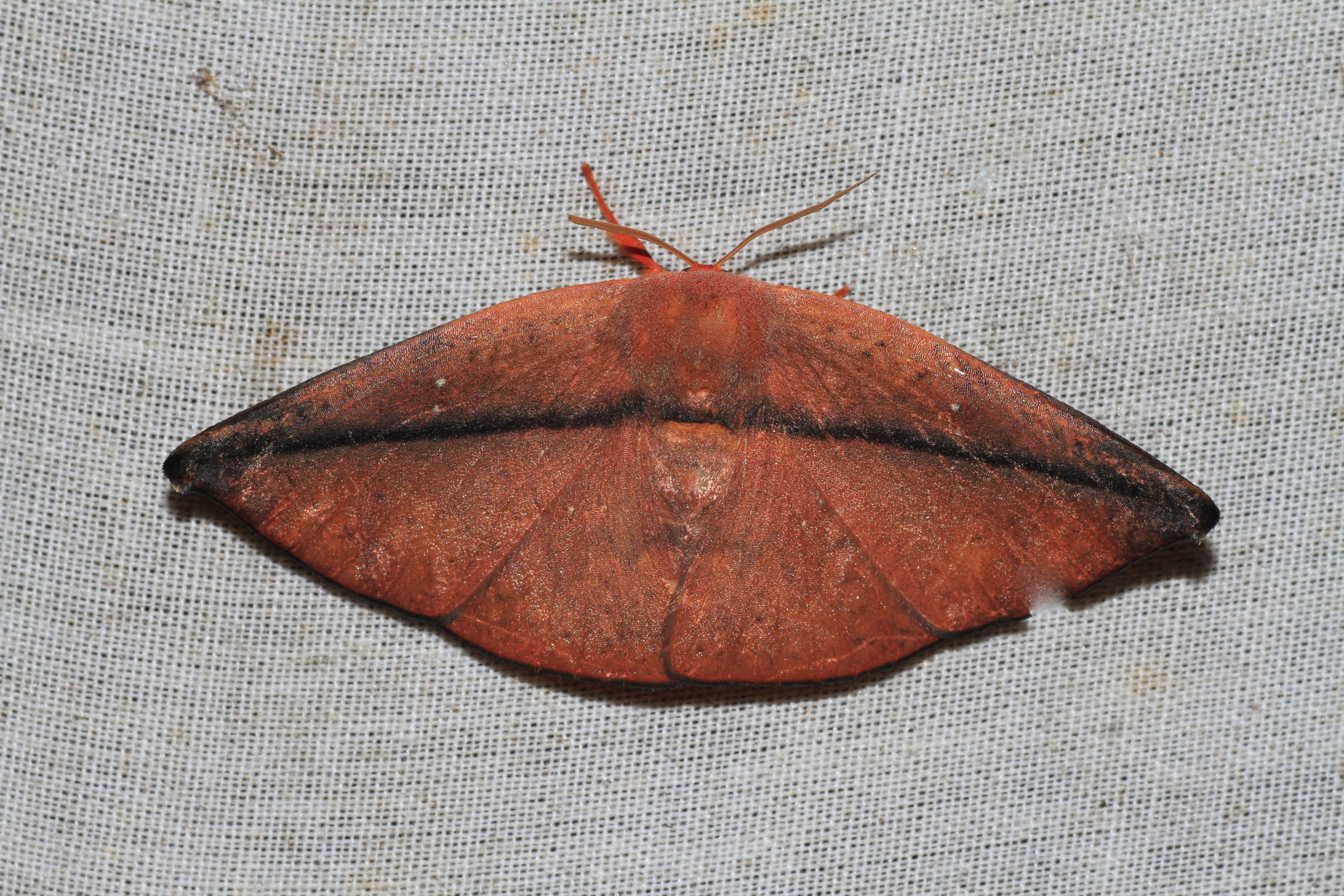

Scientific classification
- Domain: Eukaryota
- Kingdom: Animalia
- Phylum: Arthropoda
- Class: Insecta
- Order: Lepidoptera
- Family: Drepanidae
- Genus: Oreta
- Species: O. perobliquilinea

Binomial name
- Oreta perobliquilinea Warren, 1923

= Oreta perobliquilinea =

Species of hook-tip moth

Oreta perobliquilinea is a moth in the family Drepanidae. It was described by William Warren in 1923. It is found on Peninsular Malaysia, in Singapore and on Borneo.
