= Oreta singapura =

Scientific classification
- Domain: Eukaryota
- Kingdom: Animalia
- Phylum: Arthropoda
- Class: Insecta
- Order: Lepidoptera
- Family: Drepanidae
- Genus: Oreta
- Species: O. singapura

Binomial name
- Oreta singapura C. Swinhoe, 1892

Synonyms
- Cobanilla continua Warren, 1899; Oreta dissimilis Warren, 1923; Oreta aurata Warren, 1923; Oreta ustimacula Warren, 1923; Holoreta leucospila Joicey & Talbot, 1917

Species of hook-tip moth

Oreta singapura is a moth in the family Drepanidae. It was described by Charles Swinhoe in 1892. It is found in Singapore, Malaysia, Indonesia (Sumatra, Borneo, Sulawesi, Seram) and New Guinea.

Adults are fawn coloured, the wings with a few brown irrorations (sprinkles) and some pure white scales at the end of the cell of the forewings. There is a brown straight line across both wings, from the apex of the forewings to the abdominal margin of the hindwings one-third from the base, indistinctly marked with white on the forewings on the outer side and with a blackish spot with some white scales in it on the hindmargin of the forewings near the angle, the space outside the transverse line rather darker than the rest of the wings and on the hindwings there is a whitish space on the basal of the costa.

== Subspecies ==
- Oreta singapura singapura (Singapore, Malaysia, Sumatra, Borneo)
- Oreta singapura continua (Warren, 1899) (Seram, New Guinea)
- Oreta singapura kalisi Watson, 1961 (Sulawesi)
