= Oreta fulgens =

Scientific classification
- Domain: Eukaryota
- Kingdom: Animalia
- Phylum: Arthropoda
- Class: Insecta
- Order: Lepidoptera
- Family: Drepanidae
- Genus: Oreta
- Species: O. fulgens

Binomial name
- Oreta fulgens (Warren, 1899)

Synonyms
- Cobanilla fulgens Warren, 1899; Cobanilla triumbrata Warren, 1899; Oreta thaumalea West, 1932

Species of hook-tip moth

Oreta fulgens is a moth in the family Drepanidae. It was described by William Warren in 1899. It is found on Borneo, Peninsular Malaysia, the Philippines, Sulawesi, Buru and Seram.

The wingspan is about 34 mm. The forewings are olive brown with a paler pinkish costa with a few black scales. The costal edge is ochreous and the discocellular is marked with dots of white scales. The costa and outer half of the wings are lustrous pearly. The hindwings deepen in tint towards the hindmargin.
