= Oreta subvinosa =

Scientific classification
- Domain: Eukaryota
- Kingdom: Animalia
- Phylum: Arthropoda
- Class: Insecta
- Order: Lepidoptera
- Family: Drepanidae
- Genus: Oreta
- Species: O. subvinosa

Binomial name
- Oreta subvinosa Warren, 1903

Synonyms
- Oreta amblyptila Warren, 1923

Species of hook-tip moth

Oreta subvinosa is a moth in the family Drepanidae. It was described by William Warren in 1903. It is found in New Guinea, where it is known from Papua.

The wingspan is about 36 mm. The forewings are pale yellow with a faint greenish tinge. The first line is dull reddish brown and the outer line is deep chestnut brown, originating at a dark costal spot close before the apex and joined on vein 6 by a short curved brown mark from the costa. The space between the lines is dull olive brown. The yellow basal and marginal areas are freckled with brownish, the latter with a dull reddish cloud along the margin, becoming deeper reddish towards the apex. The hindwings have an antemedian red-brown fascia, the inner edge marked by a thick chestnut shade, continuing the outer line of the forewings. There is an oval grey cloud at the apex and two or three rows of dark grey spots between the veins of the outer area.
