= Eusarca lutzi =

Scientific classification
- Kingdom: Animalia
- Phylum: Arthropoda
- Clade: Pancrustacea
- Class: Insecta
- Order: Lepidoptera
- Family: Geometridae
- Tribe: Ourapterygini
- Genus: Eusarca
- Species: E. lutzi

Binomial name
- Eusarca lutzi (W. S. Wright, 1920)

Synonyms
- Euchlaena lutzi W. S. Wright, 1920

Species of moth

Eusarca lutzi is a species of geometrid moth in the family Geometridae. It is found in North America.

The species was first described by W.S. Wright in 1920, as Euchlæna lutzi.

The MONA or Hodges number for Eusarca lutzi is 6932.
