= Oreta paki =

Scientific classification
- Kingdom: Animalia
- Phylum: Arthropoda
- Class: Insecta
- Order: Lepidoptera
- Family: Drepanidae
- Genus: Oreta
- Species: O. paki

Binomial name
- Oreta paki (Inoue, 1964)

Synonyms
- Psiloreta paki Inoue, 1964

Species of hook-tip moth

Oreta paki is a moth in the family Drepanidae. It was described by Hiroshi Inoue in 1964. It is found in Korea, China (Heilongjiang, Jilin, Liaoning) and the Russian Far East.
