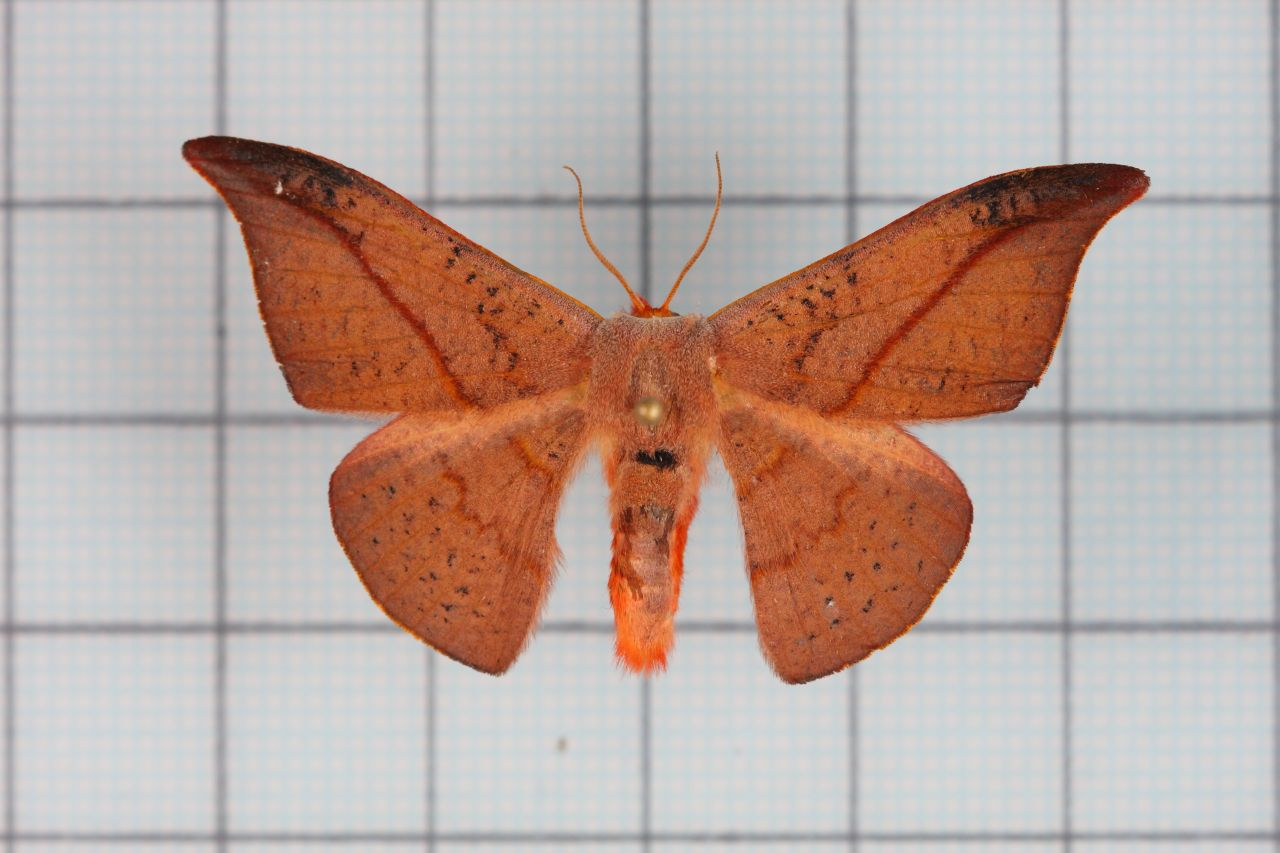

Scientific classification
- Kingdom: Animalia
- Phylum: Arthropoda
- Clade: Pancrustacea
- Class: Insecta
- Order: Lepidoptera
- Family: Drepanidae
- Genus: Oreta
- Species: O. brunnea

Binomial name
- Oreta brunnea Wileman, 1911

Synonyms
- Psiloreta brunnea (Wileman, 1911)

= Oreta brunnea =

Species of hook-tip moth

Oreta brunnea is a species of moth of the family Drepanidae. It is endemic to Taiwan. The holotype was collected from "Arizan" (=Alishan) at 2,200 m (7,300 ft) above sea level.

== Description ==
The wingspan is 37–44 mm. Adults are on wing in August.
