= Hypsidia grisea =

Scientific classification
- Kingdom: Animalia
- Phylum: Arthropoda
- Clade: Pancrustacea
- Class: Insecta
- Order: Lepidoptera
- Family: Drepanidae
- Genus: Hypsidia
- Species: H. grisea

Binomial name
- Hypsidia grisea Scoble & Edwards, 1988

Species of false owlet moth

Hypsidia grisea is a moth in the family Drepanidae. It was described by Malcolm J. Scoble and Edward David Edwards in 1988. It is found in Australia.
