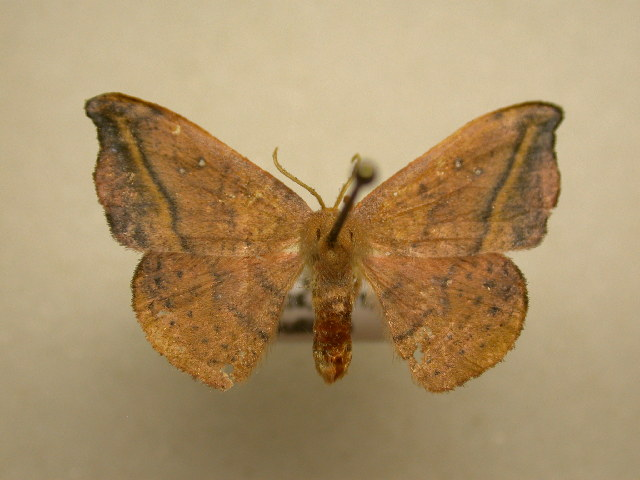

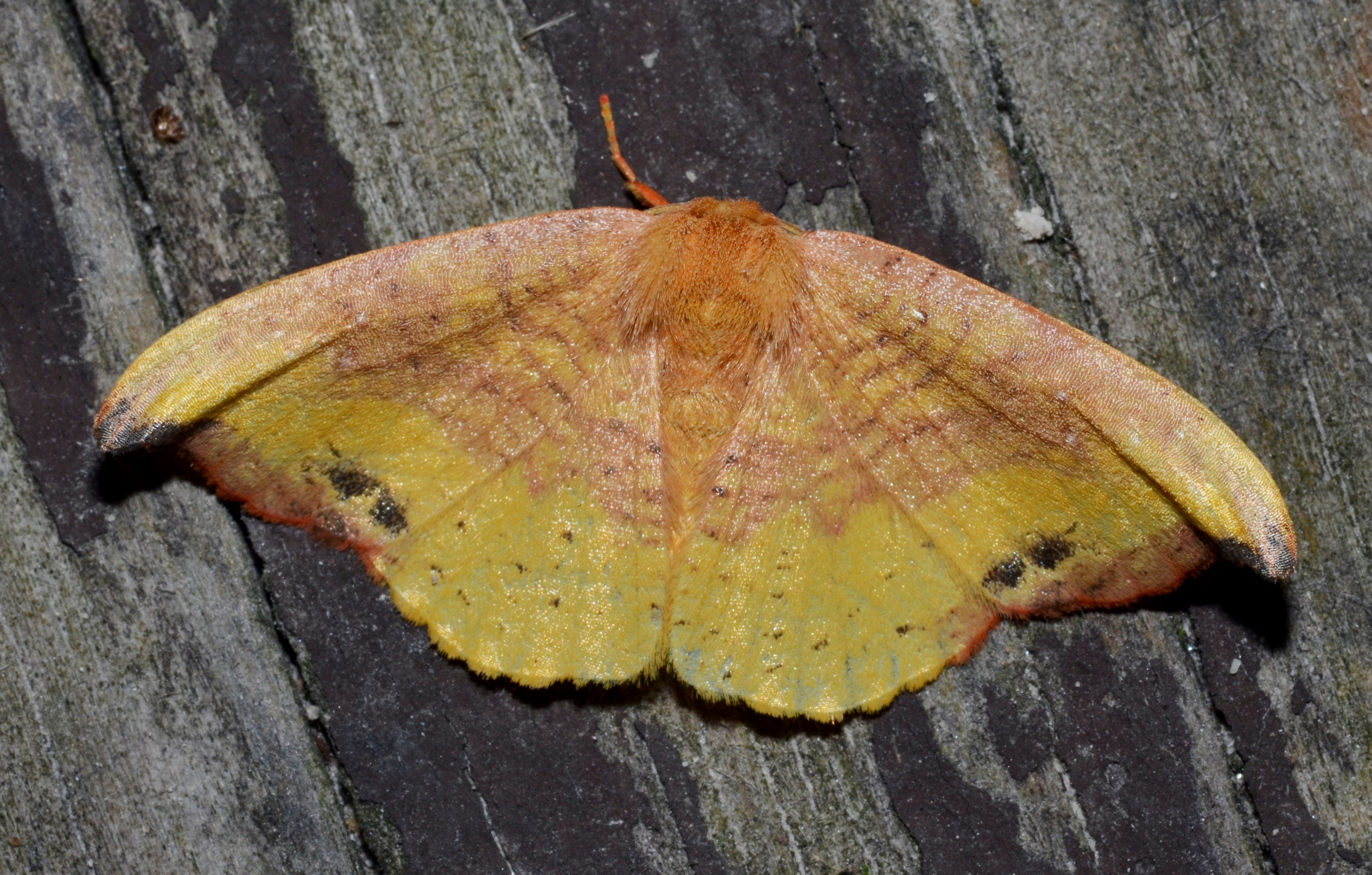

Scientific classification
- Kingdom: Animalia
- Phylum: Arthropoda
- Class: Insecta
- Order: Lepidoptera
- Family: Drepanidae
- Genus: Oreta
- Species: O. rosea

Binomial name
- Oreta rosea (Walker, 1855)

Synonyms
- Drepana rosea Walker, 1855; Drepana marginata Walker, 1855; Cilix americana Herrich-Schäffer, [1856]; Platypterix formula Grote, 1862; Dryopteris irrorata Packard, [1865]

= Oreta rosea =

Species of hook-tip moth

Oreta rosea, the rose hooktip moth, is a moth in the family Drepanidae. It was described by Francis Walker in 1855. It is found in North America, where it has been recorded across boreal Canada to eastern North America. In the north, the range extends to northern Alberta, northern Manitoba and Newfoundland. It is also found east of the Great Plains as far south as Florida and eastern Texas. The habitat consists of moist temperate hardwood forests.

The wingspan is 25–34 mm. Adults are on wing from May to September in two generations per year.

The larvae feed on various hardwood species, including Betula and Viburnum species. Larvae can be found from July to October.
