= Hypsidia microspila =

Scientific classification
- Domain: Eukaryota
- Kingdom: Animalia
- Phylum: Arthropoda
- Class: Insecta
- Order: Lepidoptera
- Family: Drepanidae
- Genus: Hypsidia
- Species: H. microspila

Binomial name
- Hypsidia microspila (Turner, 1942)

Synonyms
- Baryphanes microspila Turner, 1942

Species of false owlet moth

Hypsidia microspila is a moth in the family Drepanidae. It was described by Alfred Jefferis Turner in 1942. It is found in Australia.
