= Hypsidia erythropsalis =

Scientific classification
- Domain: Eukaryota
- Kingdom: Animalia
- Phylum: Arthropoda
- Class: Insecta
- Order: Lepidoptera
- Family: Drepanidae
- Genus: Hypsidia
- Species: H. erythropsalis

Binomial name
- Hypsidia erythropsalis Rothschild, 1896

Synonyms
- Eggersia erythropsalis

Species of false owlet moth

Hypsidia erythropsalis is a moth in the family Drepanidae. It was described by Walter Rothschild in 1896. It is found in Australia, where it has been recorded from northern Queensland. The habitat consists of rainforests.

The length of the forewings is about 25 mm for males and 30 mm for females. The forewings are slate grey, with a triangular crimson patch bordered with white at the base. There is a white blotch beyond this, the upper half of which occupied by a crimson patch. There is a crimson patch surrounded by a white ring at the end of the cell and there is a large ochre-yellow patch at the apex, slightly marked with crimson on the inner edge. There is a large marginal patch of white between veins 3 and 4, bordered outside with yellow and inside with crimson. There are also three tear-shaped splashes. There is also an orange splash washed with crimson. The basal half of the hindwings is buffy white, purer white toward the costa. The disc is crimson and the outer margin is ochre yellow, merging into the crimson of the disc.
