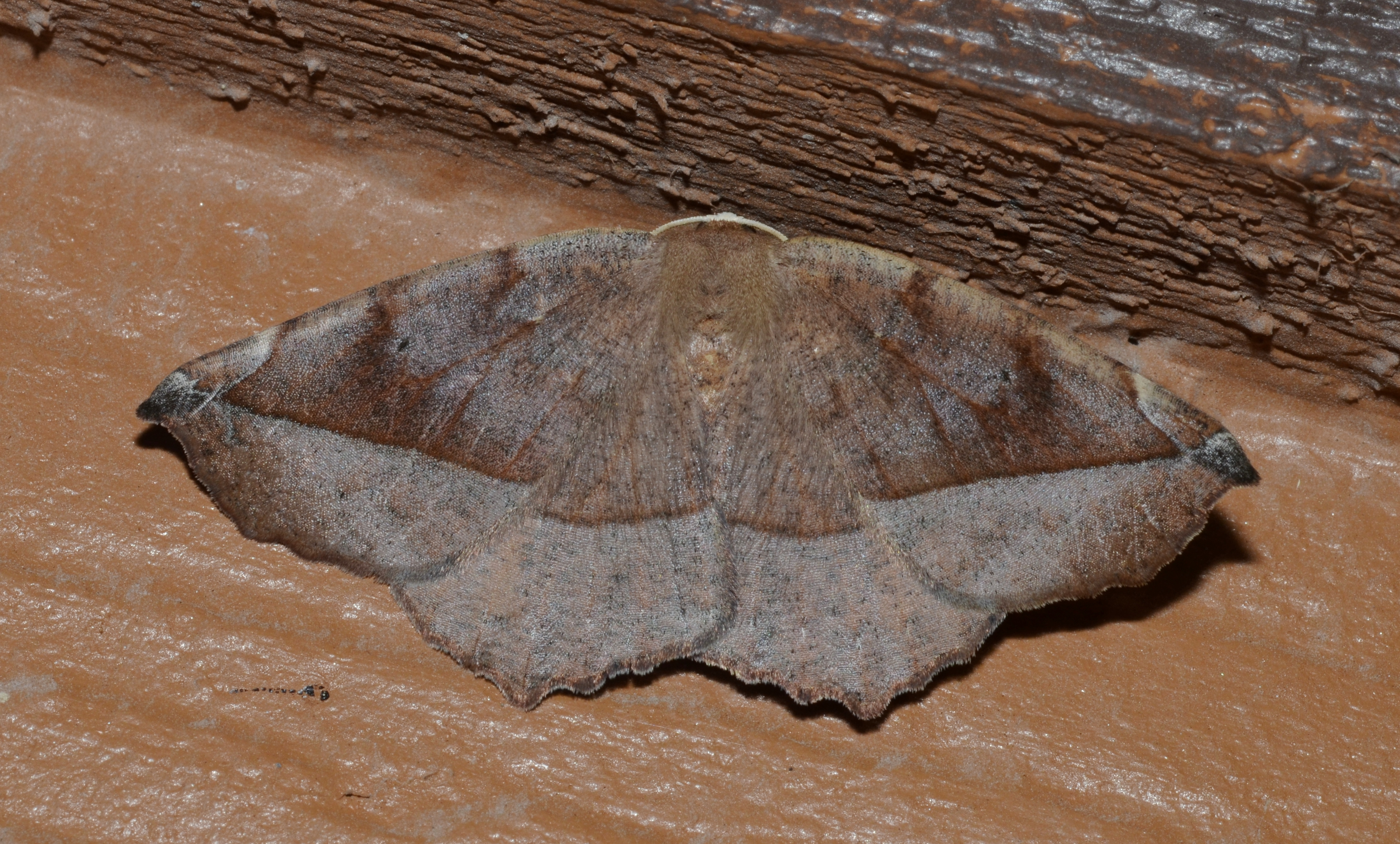

Scientific classification
- Domain: Eukaryota
- Kingdom: Animalia
- Phylum: Arthropoda
- Class: Insecta
- Order: Lepidoptera
- Family: Geometridae
- Genus: Eutrapela; Hübner, 1809
- Species: E. clemataria

Binomial name
- Eutrapela clemataria (J. E. Smith, 1797)

Synonyms
- Syndalimia Hübner, 1821; Abbottana Hulst, 1896; Phalaena clemataria Smith, 1797; Choerodes transducens Walker, 1860; Choerodes transferens Walker, 1860; Choerodes transfingens Walker, 1860

= Eutrapela =

Curve-toothed geometer moth

Genus of moths

Eutrapela is a genus of moths in the family Geometridae. It contains only one species, Eutrapela clemataria, the curve-toothed geometer moth or purplish-brown looper, which is found in North America, where it has been recorded from Nova Scotia to Florida, west to Texas and north to Saskatchewan. The habitat consists of deciduous and mixed woodlands.

The wingspan is 38–56 mm.
