= Hypsidia robinsoni =

Scientific classification
- Domain: Eukaryota
- Kingdom: Animalia
- Phylum: Arthropoda
- Class: Insecta
- Order: Lepidoptera
- Family: Drepanidae
- Genus: Hypsidia
- Species: H. robinsoni

Binomial name
- Hypsidia robinsoni Hacobian, 1986

Species of false owlet moth

Hypsidia robinsoni is a moth in the family Drepanidae. B.S. Hacobian described it in 1986. It is found in Australia, where it has been recorded from northern Queensland.
