= Hypsidia australica =

Scientific classification
- Domain: Eukaryota
- Kingdom: Animalia
- Phylum: Arthropoda
- Class: Insecta
- Order: Lepidoptera
- Family: Drepanidae
- Genus: Hypsidia
- Species: H. australica

Binomial name
- Hypsidia australica (Sick, 1938)

Synonyms
- Eggersia australica Sick, 1938

Species of false owlet moth

Hypsidia australica is a moth in the family Drepanidae. It was described by Sick in 1938. It is found in Australia, where it has been recorded from New South Wales.
