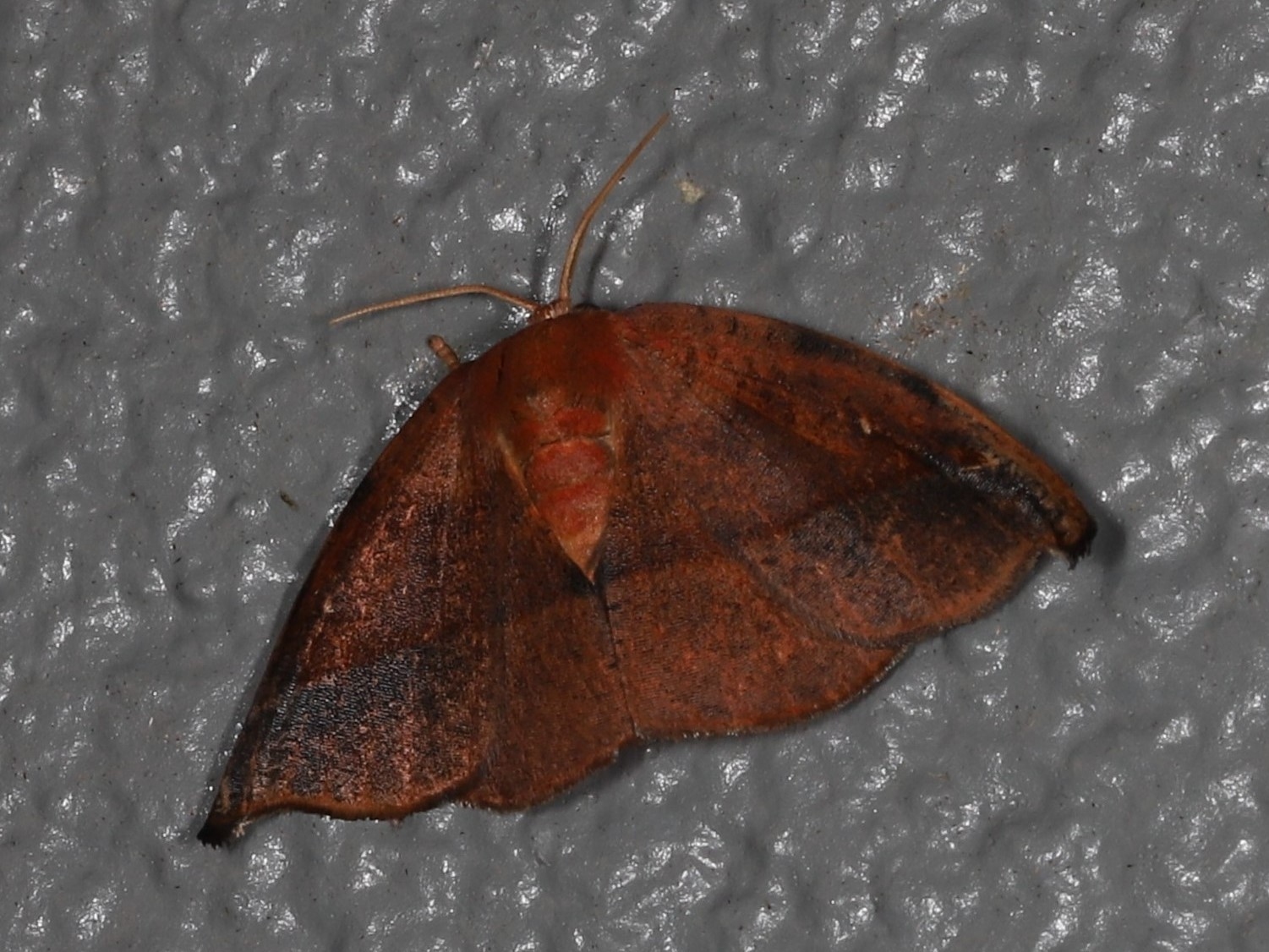

Scientific classification
- Kingdom: Animalia
- Phylum: Arthropoda
- Clade: Pancrustacea
- Class: Insecta
- Order: Lepidoptera
- Family: Drepanidae
- Genus: Neoreta
- Species: N. lechriodes

Binomial name
- Neoreta lechriodes (Turner, 1926)

Synonyms
- Cyclura lechriodes Turner, 1926; Amphitorna lechriodes (Turner, 1926)

= Neoreta lechriodes =

Species of hook-tip moth

Neoreta lechriodes is a species of moth in the family Drepanidae. It was first described by Alfred Jefferis Turner in 1926. It is found in Australia, where it has been recorded from Queensland and New South Wales.

== Description ==
The wingspan is about 32 mm for males and 38 mm for females. The forewings are reddish ochreous with some darker irroration (sprinkles). There is an outwardly oblique dark reddish line from two-thirds of the costa to vein 6, there angled and inwardly oblique to three-fifths of the dorsum. The hindwings have a gently sinuate termen and are similar to the forewings, but the transverse line from the mid-dorsum is straight.
