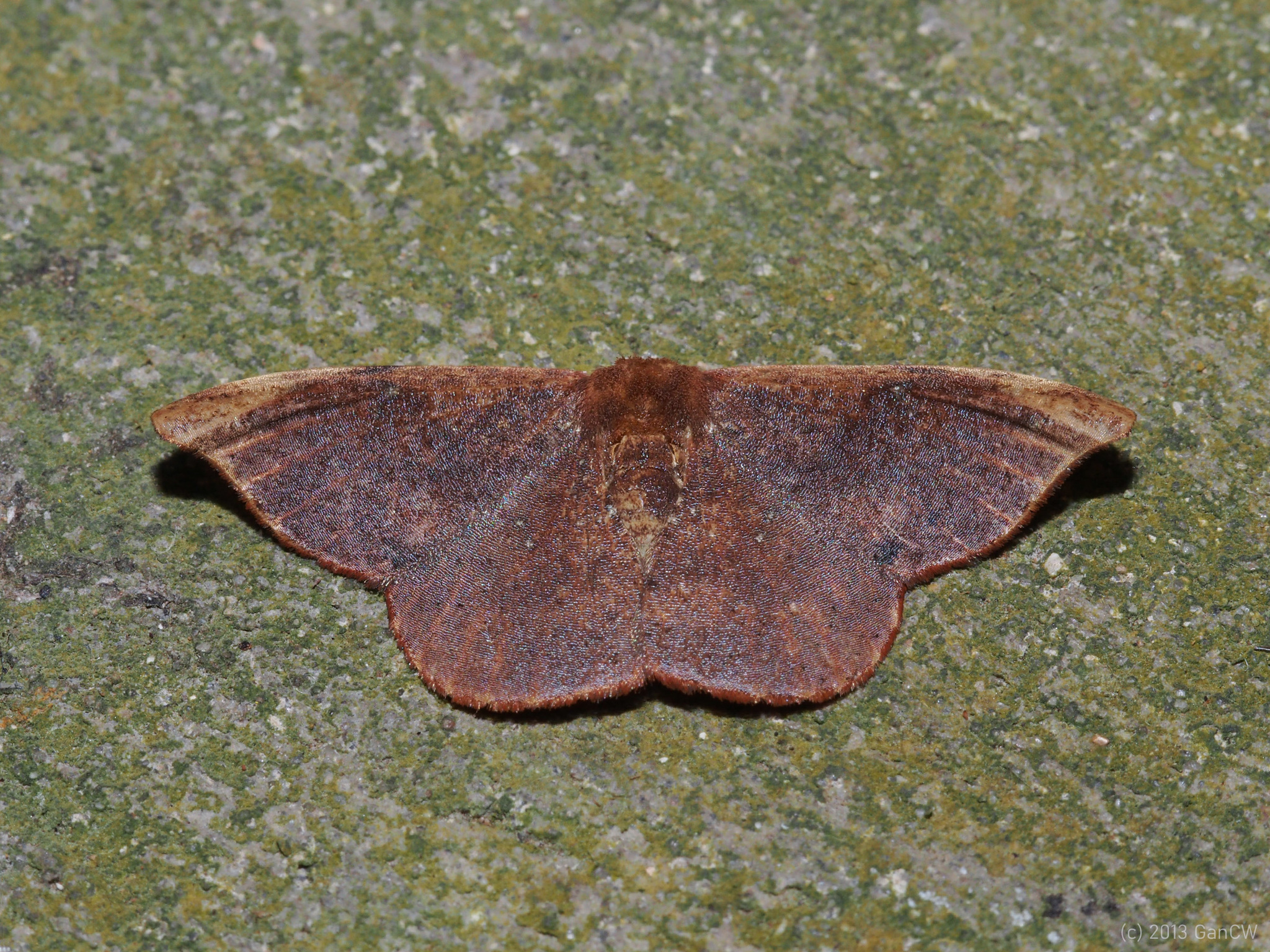

Scientific classification
- Kingdom: Animalia
- Phylum: Arthropoda
- Class: Insecta
- Order: Lepidoptera
- Family: Drepanidae
- Genus: Oreta
- Species: O. carnea

Binomial name
- Oreta carnea (Butler, 1892)

Synonyms
- Agnidra carnea Butler, 1892; Drepana berenica Swinhoe, 1893; Cobanilla hepaticata Warren, 1897; Cobanilla cardinalis Warren, 1897

= Oreta carnea =

Species of hook-tip moth

Oreta carnea is a moth in the family Drepanidae. It was described by Arthur Gardiner Butler in 1892. It is found in Malaysia, Singapore and on Sumatra, Java and Borneo.

The wingspan is about 35 mm. Adults are a sericeous (silky) pale brownish-flesh colour (brownish mixed with the idealized colour of the skin of British people in 1892), sparsely irrorated (sprinkled) with small blackish dots. The forewings are crossed by two very indistinct oblique darker lines and there is a submarginal series of rosy spots on the veins. The hindwings have two whitish stigmata on the discocellulars.

The larvae feed on Uncaria species.
