= Hypsidia niphosema =

Scientific classification
- Domain: Eukaryota
- Kingdom: Animalia
- Phylum: Arthropoda
- Class: Insecta
- Order: Lepidoptera
- Family: Drepanidae
- Genus: Hypsidia
- Species: H. niphosema

Binomial name
- Hypsidia niphosema (Lower, 1908)

Synonyms
- Monoctenia niphosema Lower, 1908

Species of false owlet moth

Hypsidia niphosema is a moth in the family Drepanidae. It was described by Oswald Bertram Lower in 1908. It is found in Australia.
