= Oreta griseotincta =

Scientific classification
- Kingdom: Animalia
- Phylum: Arthropoda
- Class: Insecta
- Order: Lepidoptera
- Family: Drepanidae
- Genus: Oreta
- Species: O. griseotincta

Binomial name
- Oreta griseotincta Hampson, 1893

Synonyms
- Oreta olivacea Dudgeon, 1899; Oreta carnea nucicolor Warren, 1923; Mimoreta horishana Matsumura, 1927; Oreta changi Inoue, 1988

Species of hook-tip moth

Oreta griseotincta is a moth in the family Drepanidae. It was described by George Hampson in 1893. It is found in China (Hainan, Hong Kong, Yunnan), Taiwan, north-eastern India, Sikkim, Malaysia and Singapore.

The wingspan is about 32 mm. The wings are chestnut brown, the forewings slightly irrorated (sprinkled) with silvery grey. The medial and postmedial dark lines are angled below the costa and approach each other towards the inner margin. There is a blackish patch on the costa before the apex and three submarginal specks towards the inner margin. The hindwings are chestnut brown, slightly irrorated with silvery grey and indistinct curved ante- and postmedial lines.

== Subspecies ==
- Oreta griseotincta griseotincta (China, Taiwan, north-eastern India, Sikkim)
- Oreta griseotincta acutior Watson, 1961 (Malaysia, Singapore)
