= Eusarca fundaria =

Scientific classification
- Kingdom: Animalia
- Phylum: Arthropoda
- Clade: Pancrustacea
- Class: Insecta
- Order: Lepidoptera
- Family: Geometridae
- Tribe: Ourapterygini
- Genus: Eusarca
- Species: E. fundaria

Binomial name
- Eusarca fundaria (Guenée in Boisduval & Guenée, 1858)

Synonyms
- Apicia fundaria Guenée in Boisduval and Guenée, 1858; Apicia impexaria Guenée in Boisduval and Guenée, 1858; Caberodes carcearia Walker, 1860; Drepanodes effascinaria Hukst, 1886

Species of moth

Eusarca fundaria, the dark-edged eusarca, is a species of geometrid moth in the family Geometridae.
