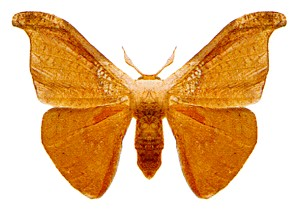

Scientific classification
- Domain: Eukaryota
- Kingdom: Animalia
- Phylum: Arthropoda
- Class: Insecta
- Order: Lepidoptera
- Family: Drepanidae
- Genus: Oreta
- Species: O. jaspidea

Binomial name
- Oreta jaspidea (Warren, 1896)

Synonyms
- Cobanilla jaspidea Warren, 1896; Cobanilla fulvata Warren, 1898; Cobanilla erminea Warren, 1899; Oreta hypocalla Lower, 1905; Oreta jaspidea hepatica Warren, 1923; Holoreta rubicunda Warren, 1902

= Oreta jaspidea =

Species of hook-tip moth

Oreta jaspidea is a moth in the family Drepanidae. It was described by William Warren in 1896. It is found on Buru, the Key Islands, New Guinea, the Bismarck Archipelago, the Louisiade Archipelago, Australia (Queensland) and the Solomon Islands.

== Subspecies ==
- Oreta jaspidea jaspidea (Buru, Key Islands, New Guinea, Bismarck Archipelago, Louisiade Archipelago, Queensland)
- Oreta jaspidea rubicunda (Warren, 1902) (Solomon Islands)
