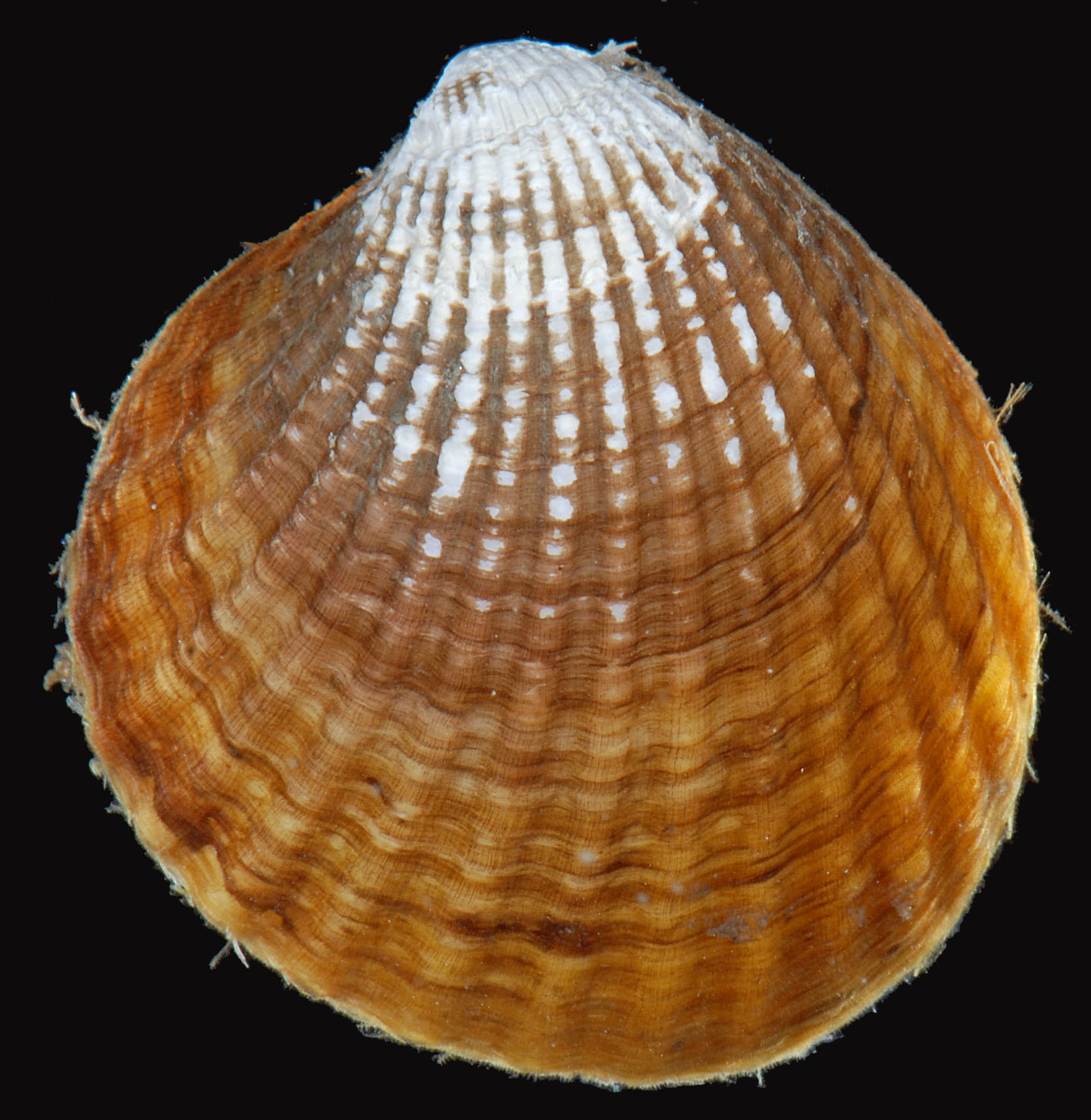

Scientific classification
- Kingdom: Animalia
- Phylum: Mollusca
- Class: Bivalvia
- Order: Carditida
- Superfamily: Carditoidea
- Family: Carditidae
- Genus: Cyclocardia
- Species: C. borealis

Binomial name
- Cyclocardia borealis (Conrad, 1832)

Synonyms
- Cardita borealis Conrad, 1832; Venericardia borealis (Conrad, 1832); Cardita vestita Deshayes, 1854; Venericardia morsei Dall, 1891

= Cyclocardia borealis =

Species of bivalve

Cyclocardia borealis, or the northern cardita or northern cyclocardia, is a species of marine bivalve in the family Carditidae. It can be found along the Atlantic coast of North America, ranging from the Arctic Ocean to Cape Hatteras. It is also known from Japan. It occurs at depths of 60–230 m (200–750 ft).
