= Centrocardita aculeata =

Scientific classification
- Domain: Eukaryota
- Kingdom: Animalia
- Phylum: Mollusca
- Class: Bivalvia
- Order: Carditida
- Superfamily: Carditoidea
- Family: Carditidae
- Genus: Centrocardita
- Species: C. aculeata

Binomial name
- Centrocardita aculeata (Poli, 1795)

Synonyms
- Cardita aculeata (Poli, 1795); Cardita aculeata var. inermis Monterosato, 1878; Cardita elegans (Requien, 1848); Cardita rhomboidea Brocchi, 1814 (dubious); Centrocardita elegans (Réquien, 1848); Chama aculeata Poli, 1795 (original combination); Chama elegans Requien, 1848; Glans aculeata (Poli, 1795)

Species of bivalve

Centrocardita aculeata is a species of marine clams in the family Carditidae. It is found in the Mediterranean Sea and the European part of the North Atlantic Ocean.
