= Claibornicardia =

Claibornicardia Temporal range: 58.7–33.9 Ma

Scientific classification
- Kingdom: Animalia
- Phylum: Mollusca
- Class: Bivalvia
- Order: Carditida
- Superfamily: Carditoidea
- Family: Carditidae
- Genus: †Claibornicardia; Stenzel & Krause, 1957

Species
- See text.

Extinct genus of bivalves in the family Carditidae

Claibornicardia is an extinct genus of marine bivalve molluscs in the family Carditidae. It is sometimes considered a subgenus of either Glyptoactis or Venericardia. It has been found in the Americas and Europe.

== Species ==
No species are yet listed by the World Register of Marine Species (as of April 2019), but they may include:

- †Claibornicardia aalterensis Vervoenen and van Nieulande, 2010
- †Claibornicardia alticostata Conrad, 1833 (also Venericardia (Claibornicardia) alticostata and, less commonly, Glyptoactis alticostata)
- †Claibornicardia carinata Sowerby 1819
- †Claibornicardia domenginica Vokes 1939 (also Glyptoactis (Claibornicardia) domenginica)
- †Claibornicardia nasuta Dall 1903 (also Venericardia (Claibornicardia) nasuta)
- †Claibornicardia paleopatagonica Ihering, 1903
- †Claibornicardia trapaquara Harris 1895 (also Venericardia (Claibornicardia) trapaquara)
