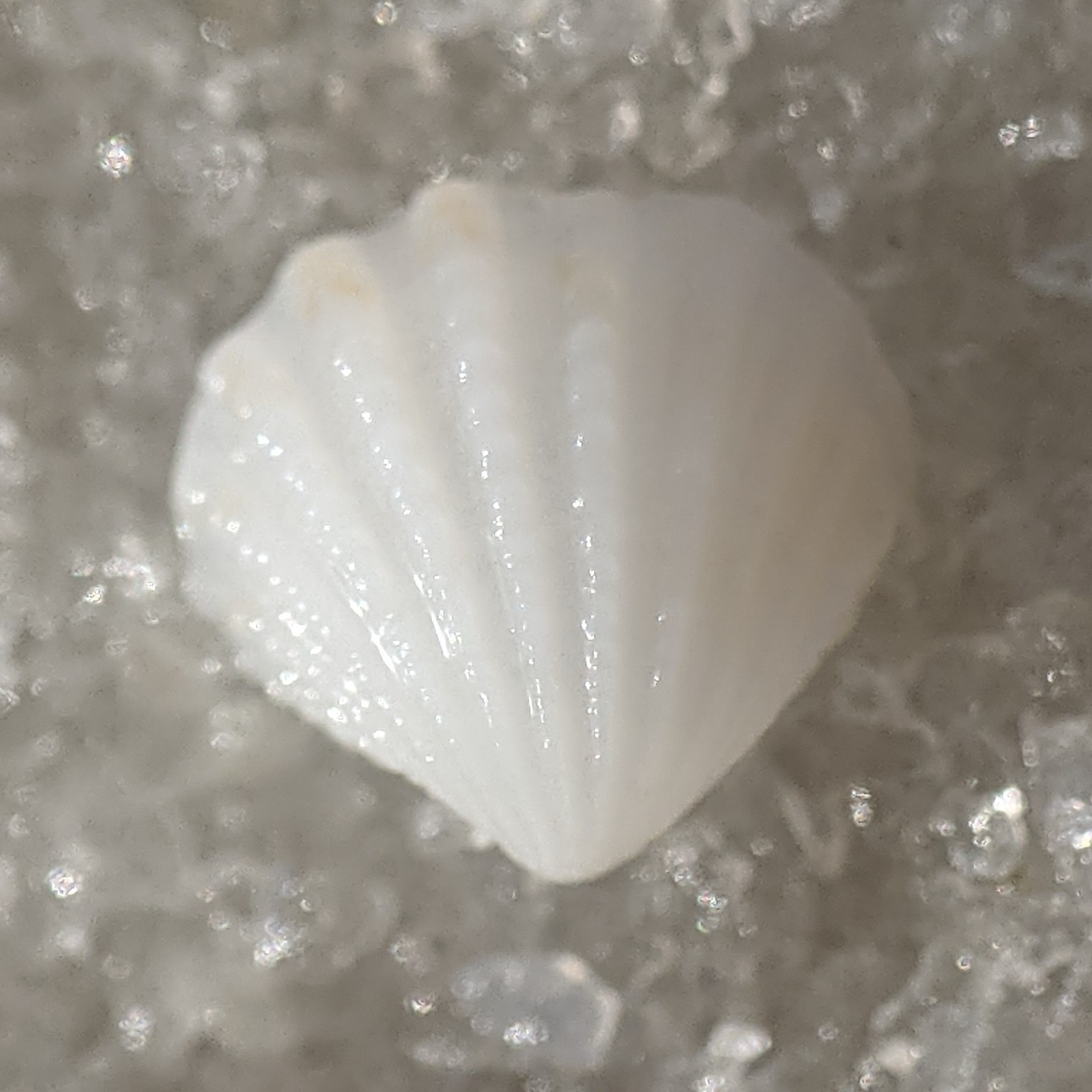

Conservation status
- Secure (NatureServe)

Scientific classification
- Kingdom: Animalia
- Phylum: Mollusca
- Class: Bivalvia
- Order: Carditida
- Superfamily: Carditoidea
- Family: Carditidae
- Genus: Pleuromeris
- Species: P. tridentata

Binomial name
- Pleuromeris tridentata (Say, 1826)

= Pleuromeris tridentata =

Species of bivalve

Pleuromeris tridentata, or the three-toothed cardita, is a species of bivalve mollusc in the family Carditidae. It can be found along the Atlantic coast of North America, ranging from North Carolina to Florida.

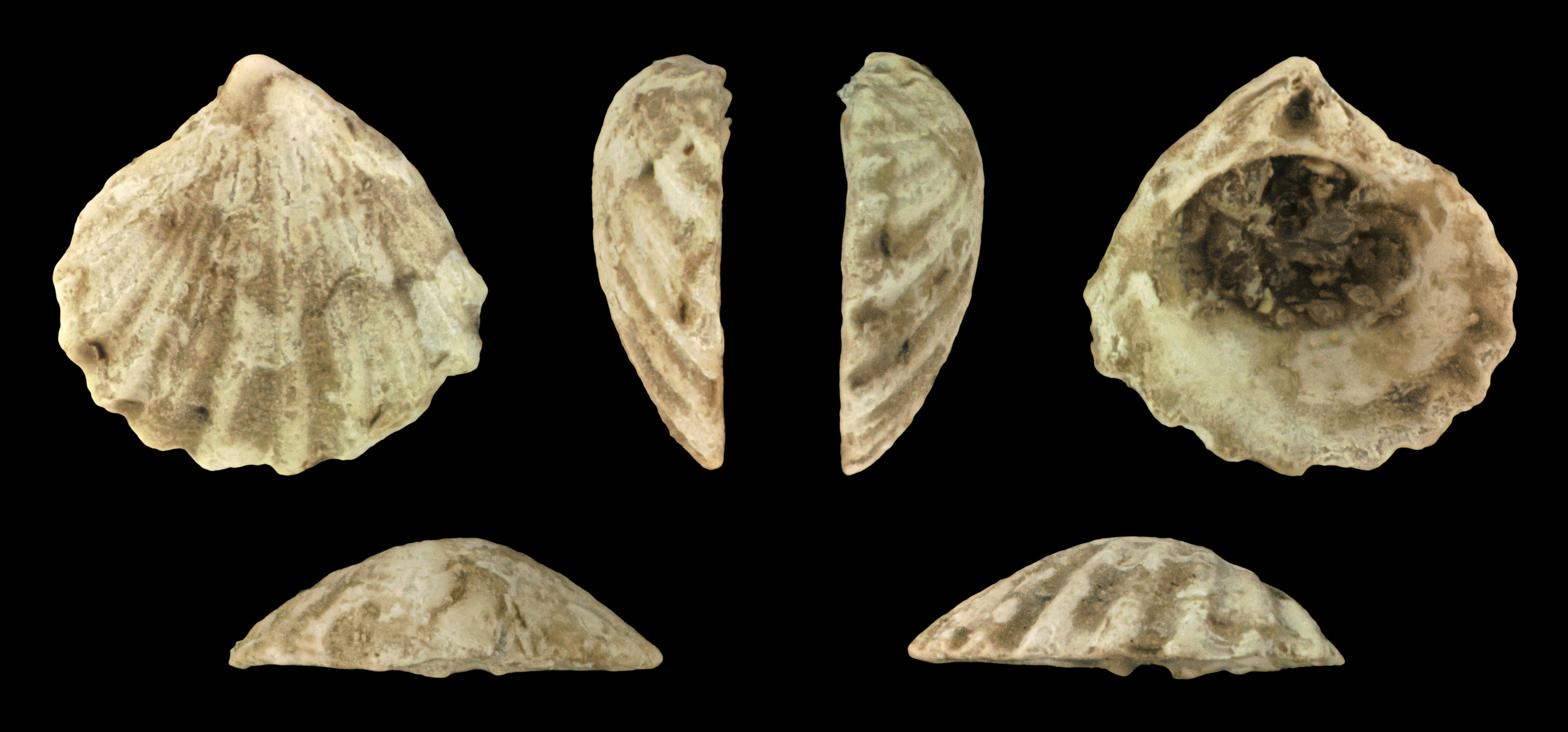
Fossil, Juvenile
