= Pteromeris perplana =

Scientific classification
- Kingdom: Animalia
- Phylum: Mollusca
- Class: Bivalvia
- Order: Carditida
- Superfamily: Carditoidea
- Family: Carditidae
- Genus: Pteromeris
- Species: P. perplana

Binomial name
- Pteromeris perplana (Conrad, 1841)

Species of bivalve

Pteromeris perplana, or the flat cardita, is a species of bivalve mollusc in the family Carditidae. It can be found along the Atlantic coast of North America, ranging from North Carolina to Florida.
