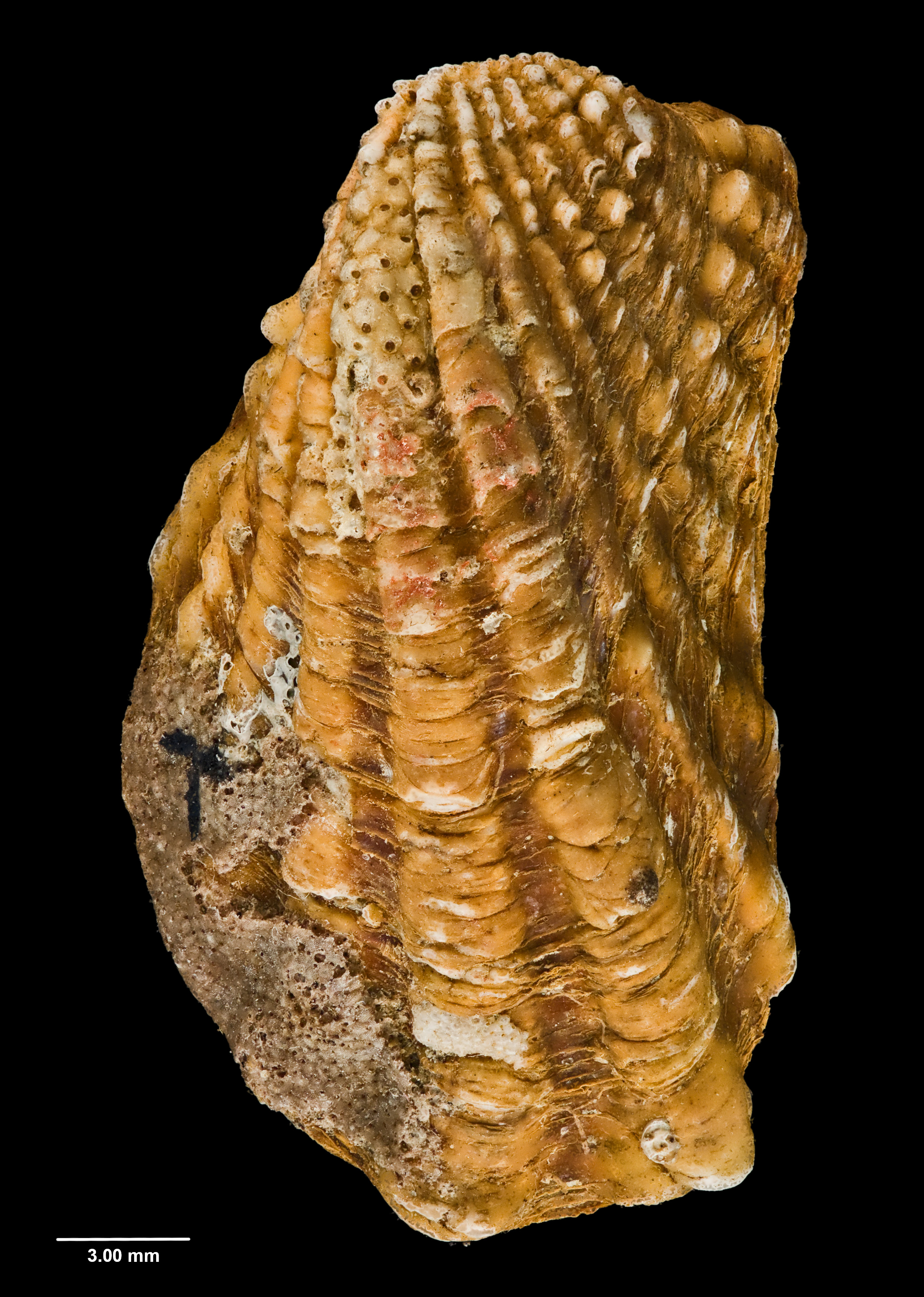

Scientific classification
- Kingdom: Animalia
- Phylum: Mollusca
- Class: Bivalvia
- Order: Carditida
- Superfamily: Carditoidea
- Family: Carditidae
- Genus: Cardita
- Species: C. distorta

Binomial name
- Cardita distorta Reeve, 1843

Synonyms
- Cardita aoteana Finlay, 1926

= Cardita distorta =

Species of bivalve

Cardita distorta, or the dog's foot cockle, is a bivalve mollusc of the family Carditidae, endemic to New Zealand including the Chatham Islands and southern offshore islands. It is found from low tide to depths of approximately 185 m.
