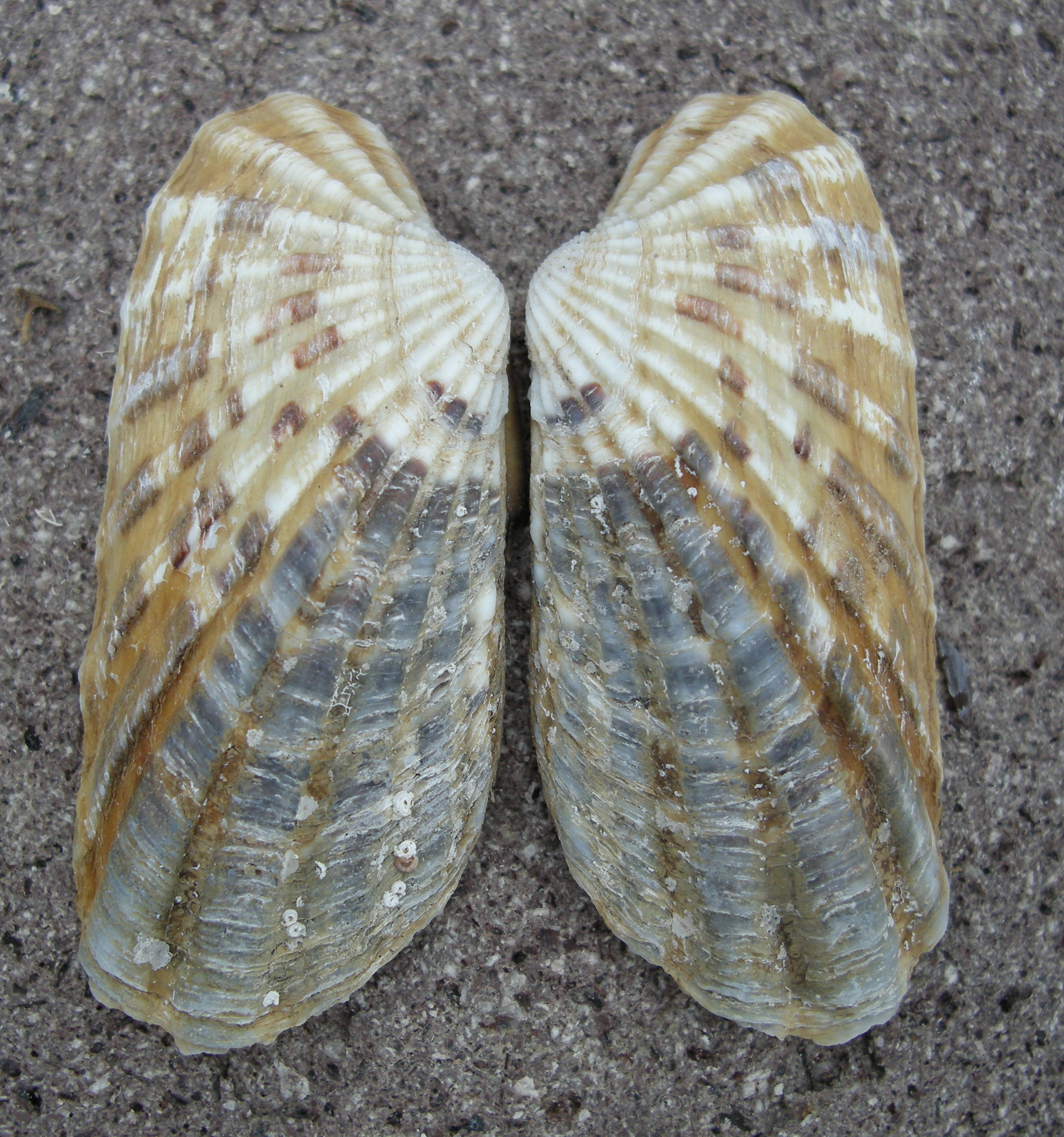

Scientific classification
- Kingdom: Animalia
- Phylum: Mollusca
- Class: Bivalvia
- Order: Carditida
- Superfamily: Carditoidea
- Family: Carditidae
- Genus: Carditamera
- Species: C. affinis

Binomial name
- Carditamera affinis (Sowerby I, 1833)

Synonyms
- Cardita affinis Sowerby I, 1833

= Carditamera affinis =

Species of bivalve

Carditamera affinis is a species of marine bivalve mollusc. It was first described to science by George Brettingham Sowerby I in 1833. No English common name has been recorded for this species. The first appearance of this animal in the fossil record is 5.333 million years ago.

== Description ==
The shell is roughly trapezoidal with 15 raised ribs. In some individuals, small spines or scales are found on the posterior ends (furthest from the hinge) of the larger ribs. The shell is colored in brown shades both on its exterior and interior. Shells have been recorded between 50.7mm and 101.2mm (2 to 4 inches) long.

Right and left valve of the same specimen:

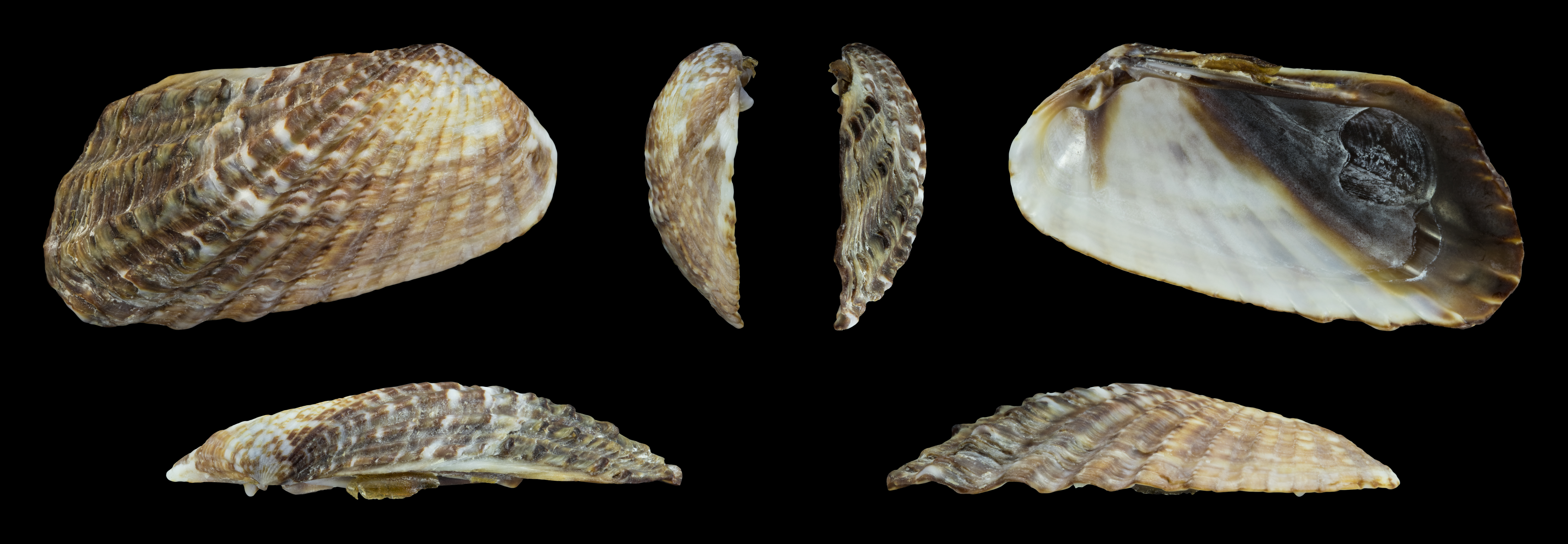
Right valve

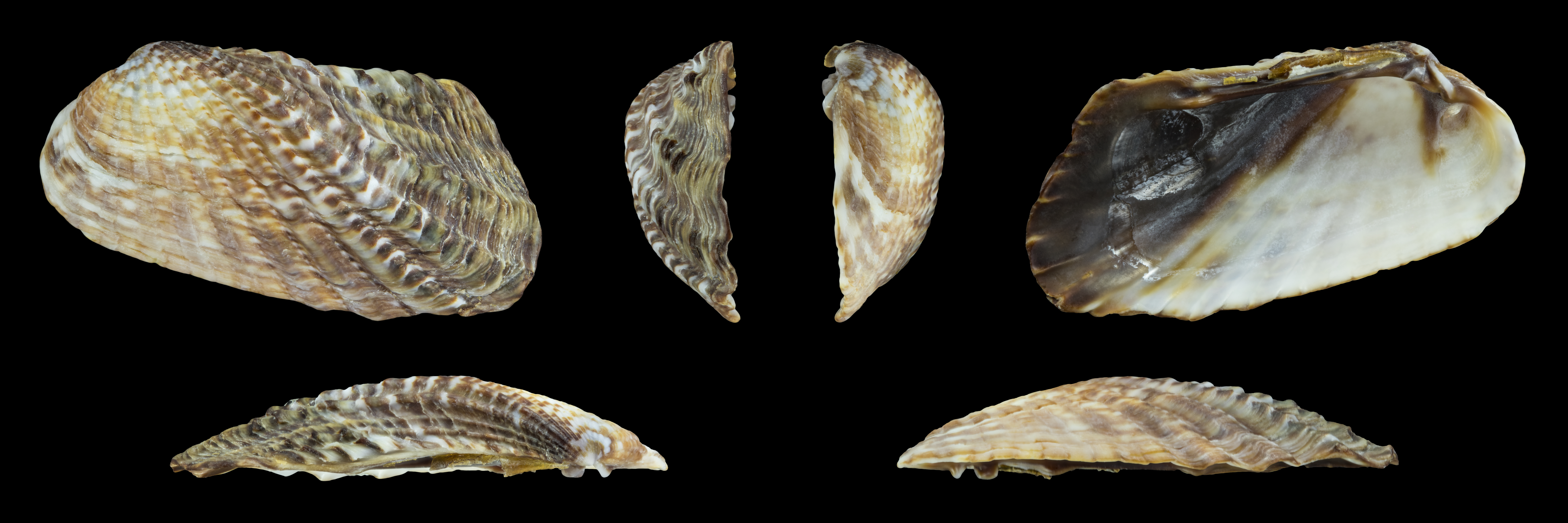
Left valve

== Distribution ==
Carditamera affinis is found in the eastern Pacific Ocean from California to Peru. It is also found in the Gulf of California and was one of the specimens collected there by John Steinbeck and Ed Ricketts, as recounted in The Log From The Sea Of Cortez. In 2012 a very similar looking species, Carditamera bajaensis, was split from C. affinis. Both species occur in the Gulf of California, but in different habitats. While C. affinis is epifaunal, that is it lives at the surface of the seabed on rocks and in crevices, C. bajaensis is infaunal or semi-infaunal, living completely or partly buried in sand, mud, or loose rocks. C. affinis is also found in the Galapagos Islands. This is a shallow-water species, living from the intertidal zone down to 27 meters (90 feet) deep.

== Life history ==
Carditamera affinis is a filter feeder, straining nutrients from sea water that it pumps through its body. It is sessile as an adult, attaching itself to rocks and within crevices using a byssus.

These animals can live as long as 17.25 years.
