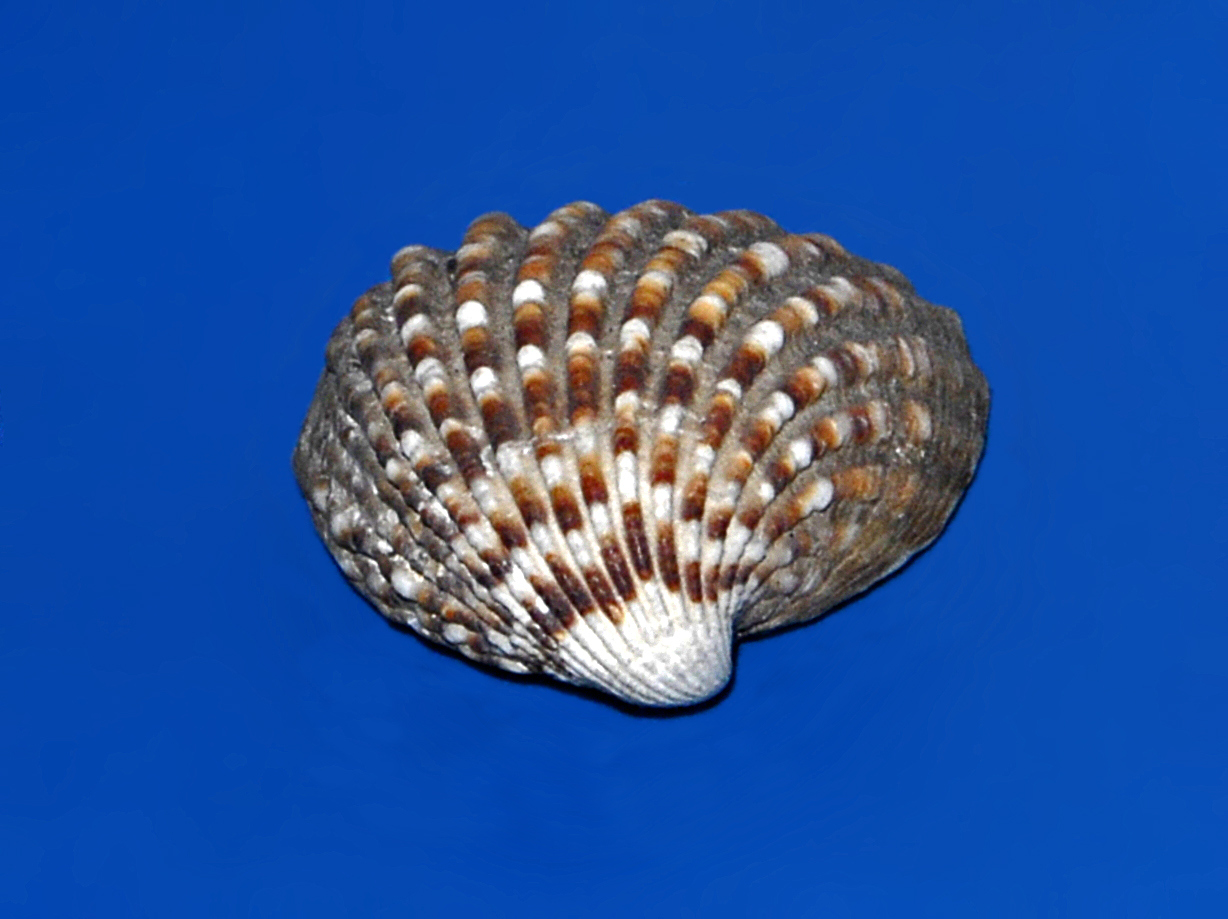
- Shell of Cardites antiquatus from Sardinia at the Museo Civico di Storia Naturale di Milano

Scientific classification
- Kingdom: Animalia
- Phylum: Mollusca
- Class: Bivalvia
- Order: Carditida
- Superfamily: Carditoidea
- Family: Carditidae
- Genus: Cardites
- Species: C. antiquatus

Binomial name
- Cardites antiquatus (Linnaeus, 1758)

= Cardites antiquatus =

Species of bivalve

Cardites antiquatus is a species of marine bivalve molluscs, in the family Carditidae.

== Description ==
Cardites antiquatus has a shell reaching a size of 20–30 millimetres (0.79–1.18 in).

Right and left valve of the same specimen:

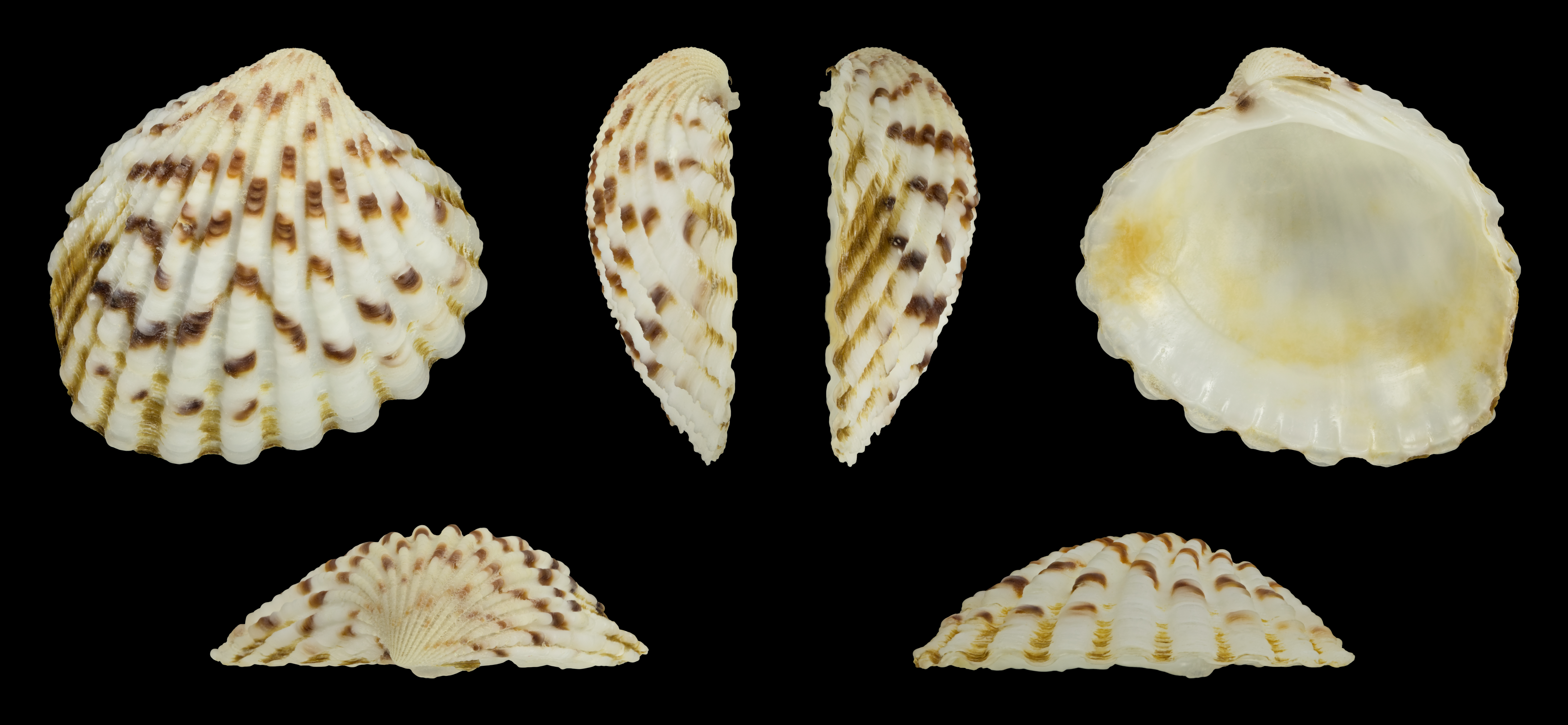
Right valve

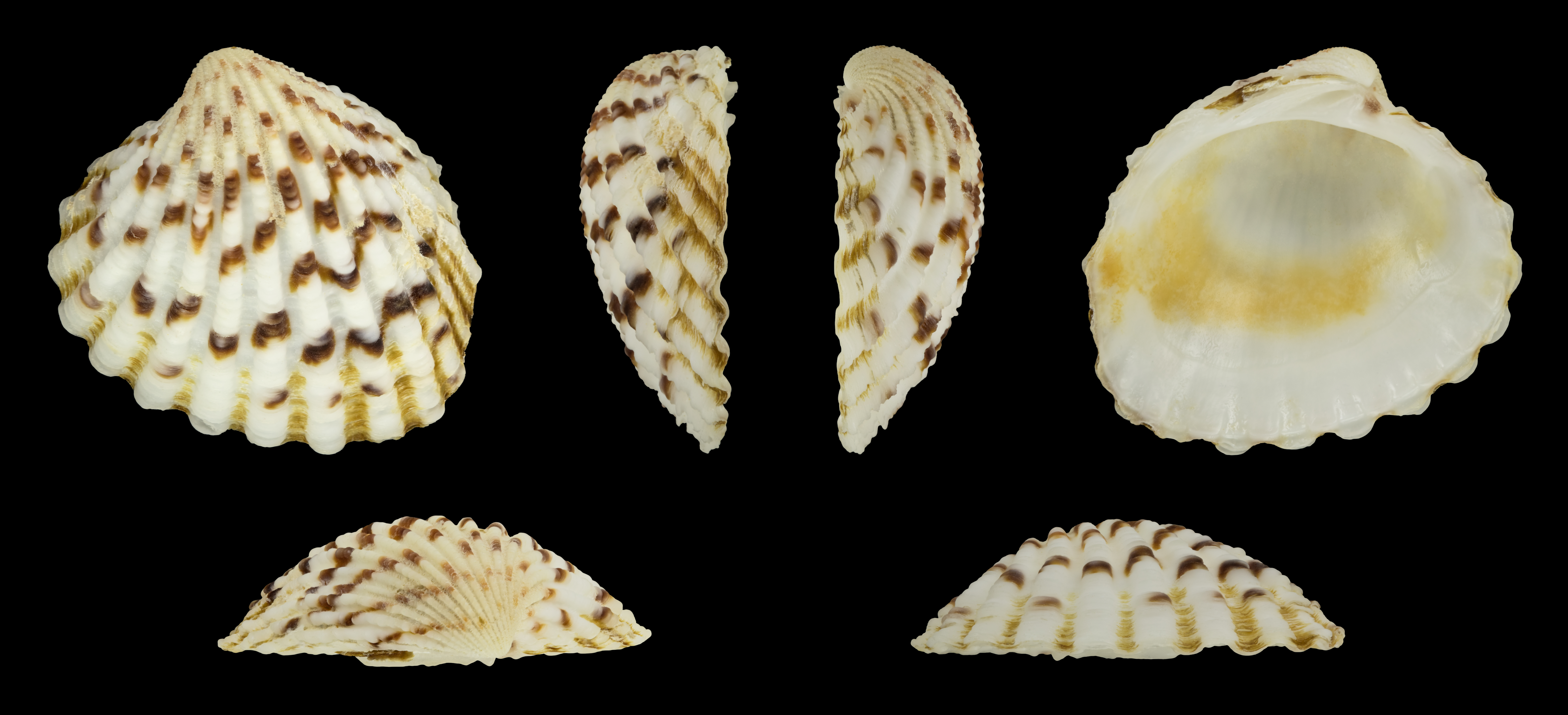
Left valve

== Distribution and habitat ==
This species is native to the Mediterranean Sea. It lives in muddy and sandy seabed at depths of 5 to 45 m.
