= Pteromeris =

Scientific classification
- Domain: Eukaryota
- Kingdom: Animalia
- Phylum: Mollusca
- Class: Bivalvia
- Order: Carditida
- Superfamily: Carditoidea
- Family: Carditidae
- Genus: Pteromeris; Conrad, 1862

Genus of bivalves

Pteromeris is a genus of molluscs in the family Carditidae.

The related genus Coripia is sometimes included here.

== Species ==
- Pteromeris perplana (Conrad, 1841) – flat cardita
