= Carditamera =

Scientific classification
- Kingdom: Animalia
- Phylum: Mollusca
- Class: Bivalvia
- Order: Carditida
- Superfamily: Carditoidea
- Family: Carditidae
- Genus: Carditamera; Conrad, 1838

Synonyms
- Byssomera Olsson, 1961; Lazaria Gray, 1854

Genus of bivalves

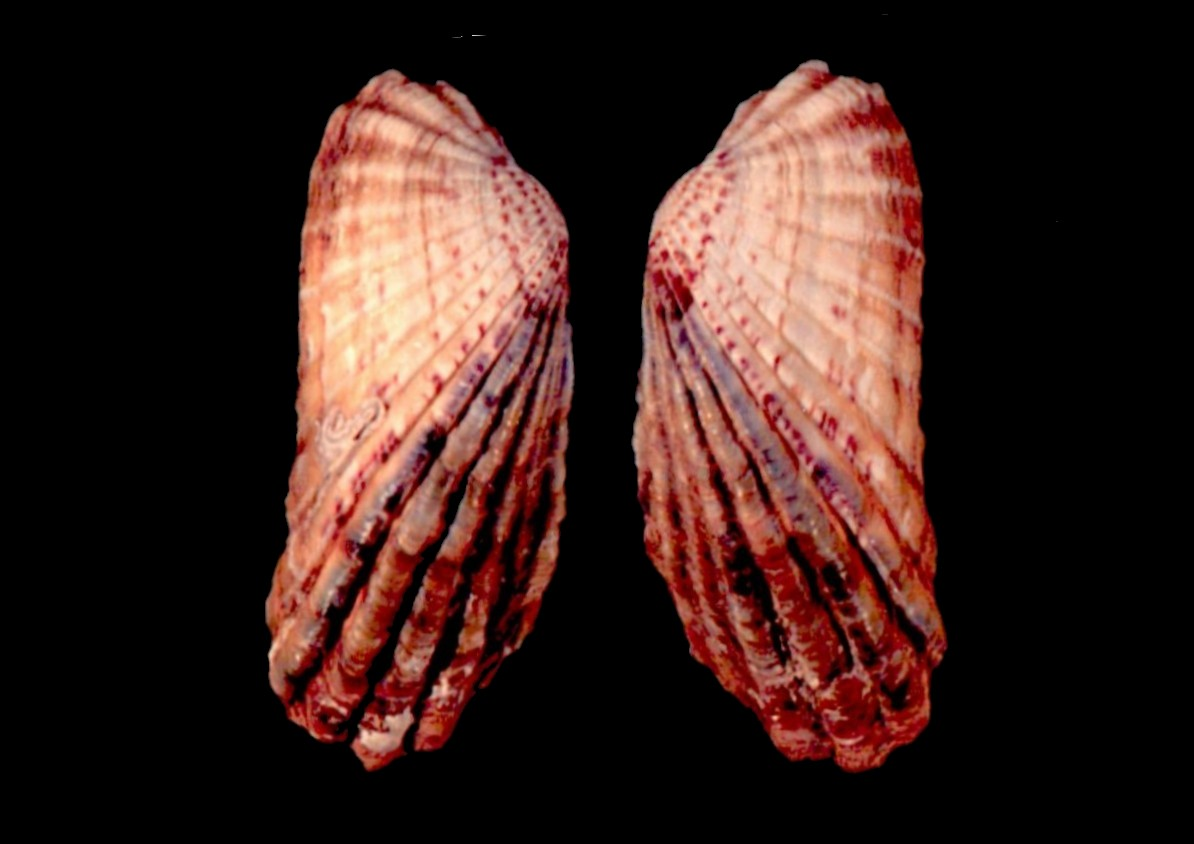
Carditamera gracilis shell

Carditamera is a genus of molluscs in the family Carditidae.

It is the type genus of the subfamily Carditamerinae. Byssomera is a junior synonym or subgenus of Carditamera but has sometimes been written as a subgenus of Cardita, due to its type species having been synonymised from Cardita (Byssomera) affinis to Carditamera (Byssomera) affinis.

== Species ==
- Carditamera affinis (G.B. Sowerby I, 1833)
- Carditamera arata (Conrad, 1838)
- Carditamera contigua (Dautzenberg, 1910)
- Carditamera floridana (Conrad, 1838)
- Carditamera gracilis (Shuttleworth, 1856) – West Indian cardita
- Carditamera plata (Ihering, 1907)
- Carditamera radiata (G.B. Sowerby I, 1833)
- Carditamera rolani (Cosel, 1995)
