= Glyptoactis =

Glyptoactis Temporal range: 66.043–2.58 Ma

Scientific classification
- Domain: Eukaryota
- Kingdom: Animalia
- Phylum: Mollusca
- Class: Bivalvia
- Order: Carditida
- Superfamily: Carditoidea
- Family: Carditidae
- Genus: Glyptoactis; Stewart, 1930

Subgenera and species
- See text.

Genus of bivalves

Glyptoactis is a mostly extinct genus of bivalves in the family Carditidae. They have been recovered from the Castle Hayne Limestone geologic formation in North Carolina and in France.

== Subgenera and species ==
Subgenera:

- †Glyptoactis (Claibornicardia) Stenzel and Krause, 1957
- †Glyptoactis (Fasciculicardia) Maxwell, 1969
- Glyptoactis (Glyptoactis) Stewart, 1930

Species according to the World Register of Marine Species as of April 2019:

- †Glyptoactis acanthodes (Suter, 1917)
- †Glyptoactis allophyla P. A. Maxwell, 1992
- †Glyptoactis bartrumi (C. A. Fleming, 1950)
- †Glyptoactis benhami (Thomson, 1908)
- †Glyptoactis faceta (Suter, 1917)
- †Glyptoactis hadra (Dall, 1903)
- †Glyptoactis healyi (C. A. Fleming, 1950)
- †Glyptoactis hebertiana (d'Orbigny, 1850)
- †Glyptoactis nuntia (Marwick, 1928)
- †Glyptoactis subintermedia (Suter, 1917)
- Glyptoactis wendellwoodringi (Weisbord, 1964)

Other species according to Fossilworks:

- †Glyptoactis aversa (Pilsbry and Johnson, 1917)
- †Glyptoactis carmenensis Clark and Durham, 1946
- †Glyptoactis charanalensis (Olsson, 1931)
- †Glyptoactis metaicha Woodring, 1982
- †Glyptoactis mutabilis (dArchaic and Haime, 1954)
- †Glyptoactis paraguanensis (Hodson, 1931)
- †Glyptoactis serricosta (Heilprin, 1887)
- †Glyptoactis stenygra Woodring, 1982

Notes:

- In some classifications, †Claibornicardia alticostata, or †Venericardia (Claibornicardia) alticostata, is considered †Glyptoactis alticostata Conrad, 1833.
- In some classifications, †Claibornicardia domenginica is considered †Glyptoactis (Claibornicardia) domenginica.
