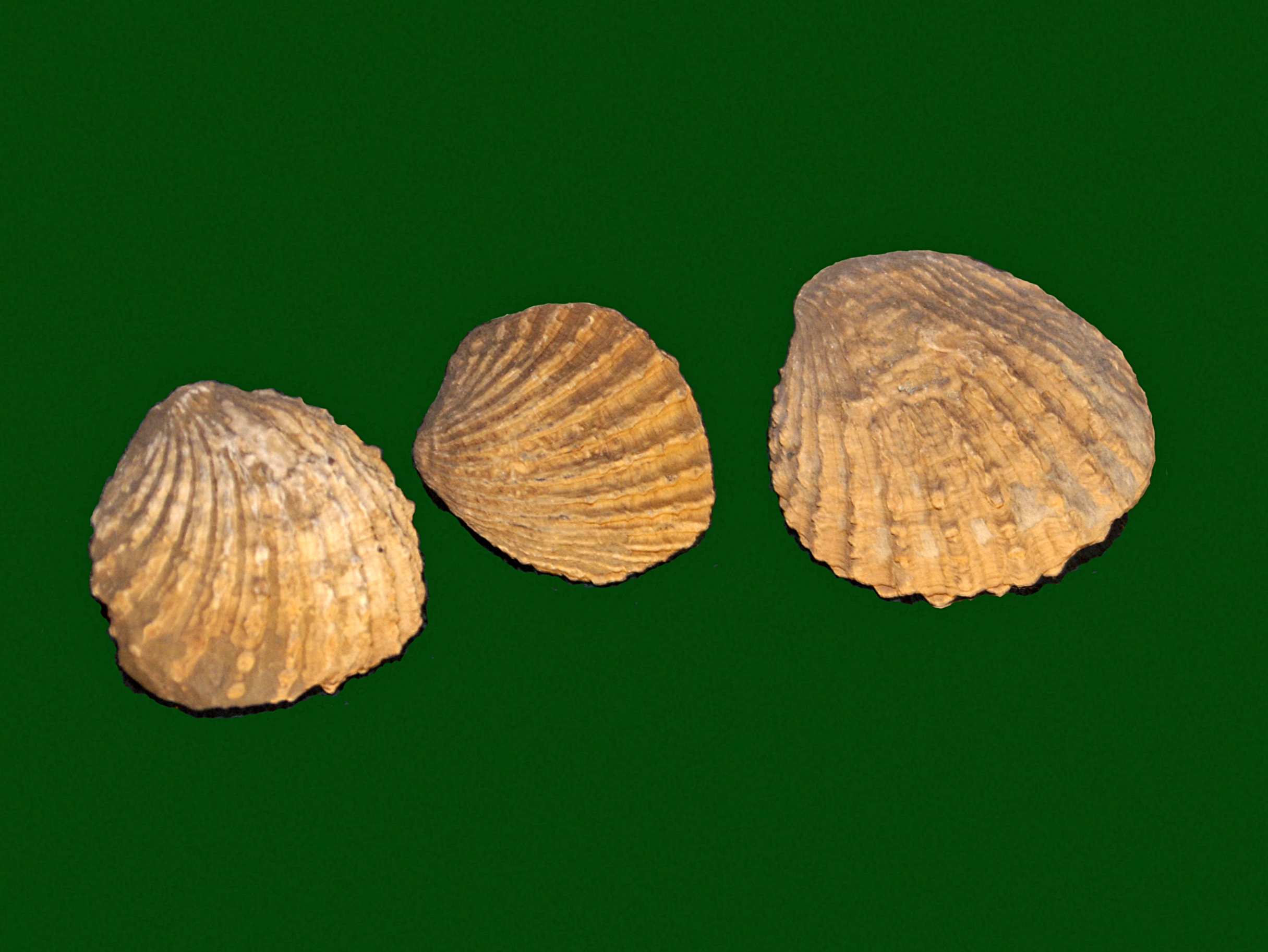
- Fossil Venericardia (Baluchicardia) ameliae (Peron) of Maastrichtian age from Algeria at Galerie de paléontologie et d'anatomie comparée in Paris

Scientific classification
- Kingdom: Animalia
- Phylum: Mollusca
- Class: Bivalvia
- Order: Carditida
- Family: Carditidae
- Genus: †Baluchicardia; Heaslip, 1968

Synonyms
- Venericardia (Baluchicardia)

= Baluchicardia =

Baluchicardia Temporal range: from Late Cretaceous to Eocene, 72.1–47.8 Ma

Extinct genus of bivalves

Baluchicardia is an extinct genus of fossil saltwater clams in the family Carditidae. These clams were facultatively mobile infaunal suspension feeders.

== Subtaxa ==
Some authors consider Baluchicardia a subgenus of Venericardia.

- Baluchicardia francescae
- Baluchicardia nuriae
- Baluchicardia obliquata
- Venericardia (Baluchicardia) ameliae
- Venericardia (Baluchicardia) amplicrenata
- Venericardia (Baluchicardia) bulla
- Venericardia (Baluchicardia) greggiana
- Venericardia (Baluchicardia) hesperia
- Venericardia (Baluchicardia) moa
- Venericardia (Baluchicardia) whitei
- Venericardia (Baluchicardia) wilcoxensis

== Distribution ==
Species within this genus have been found in the Eocene of the United States, in the Paleocene of Colombia and the United States, and in the Cretaceous of Angola, Argentina, Brazil, Cameroon, Egypt, France, Iran, Jordan, Libya, Morocco, Mozambique, Niger, Nigeria, Oman, Pakistan, Saudi Arabia, Senegal and Tunisia.
