= Centrocardita =

Centrocardita Temporal range: 99.7–0.012 Ma

Scientific classification
- Domain: Eukaryota
- Kingdom: Animalia
- Phylum: Mollusca
- Class: Bivalvia
- Order: Carditida
- Superfamily: Carditoidea
- Family: Carditidae
- Genus: Centrocardita; Sacco, 1899

Species
- See text

Genus of bivalves

Centrocardita is an extant genus of marine clams in the family Carditidae. It is also represented in the fossil record. It is sometimes treated as a subgenus of Glans.

== Species ==
- Centrocardita aculeata (Poli, 1795)
- Centrocardita akabana (Sturany, 1899)
- Centrocardita belcheri (Deshayes, 1854)
- Centrocardita donghaiensis (Xu, 2012)
- Centrocardita echinaria (Melvill & Standen, 1907)
- Centrocardita gunnii (Deshayes, 1854)
- Centrocardita hirasei (Dall, 1918)
- Centrocardita inquinata (Nicklès, 1955)
- Centrocardita millegrana (Nomura & Zinbo, 1934)
- Centrocardita pseudocardita (Poutiers, 1981)
- Centrocardita rosulenta (Tate, 1887)
- Centrocardita sagamiensis (Kuroda & Habe in Habe, 1961)
- Centrocardita soyoae (Habe, 1958)
- Centrocardita squamigera (Deshayes, 1832)

Synonyms

- Centrocardita elegans (Réquien, 1848), synonym of Centrocardita aculeata
- Centrocardita pileolata Oliver & Holmes, 2004, synonym of Carditella pileolata
