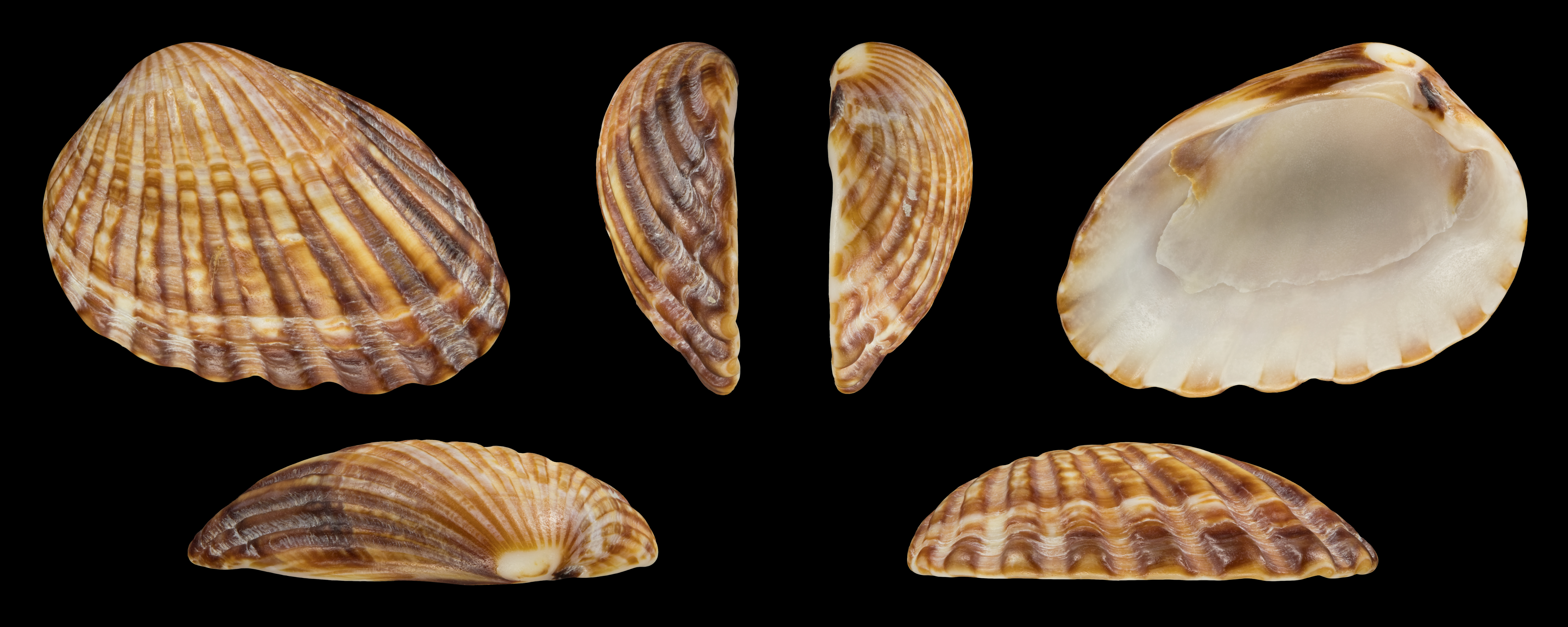
- Cardites floridanus brown form, left valve

Scientific classification
- Kingdom: Animalia
- Phylum: Mollusca
- Class: Bivalvia
- Order: Carditida
- Family: Carditidae
- Genus: Cardites
- Species: C. floridana

Binomial name
- Cardites floridana (Conrad, 1838)

= Cardites floridanus =

Species of mollusc

Cardites floridana, or the Broad-ribbed Carditid, is a marine clam in the family Carditidae. It can be found along the coasts of Florida, Central America, South America (Brazil, Uruguay) and the Gulf of Mexico.

== Description ==
The shell shape of C. floridana is elongated quadrangular. The color is whitish gray with small areas of brown arranged on the ribs, covered by gray periostracum. It has approximately 20 coarse, rounded, beaded radial ribs. The interior is white with small light brown patches above muscle scars. It grows to be around 18–38 mm long. It typically inhabits sea-grass at a depth no more than 35 m (100 ft).

Cardites floridanus, grey form
Right and left valve of the same specimen:

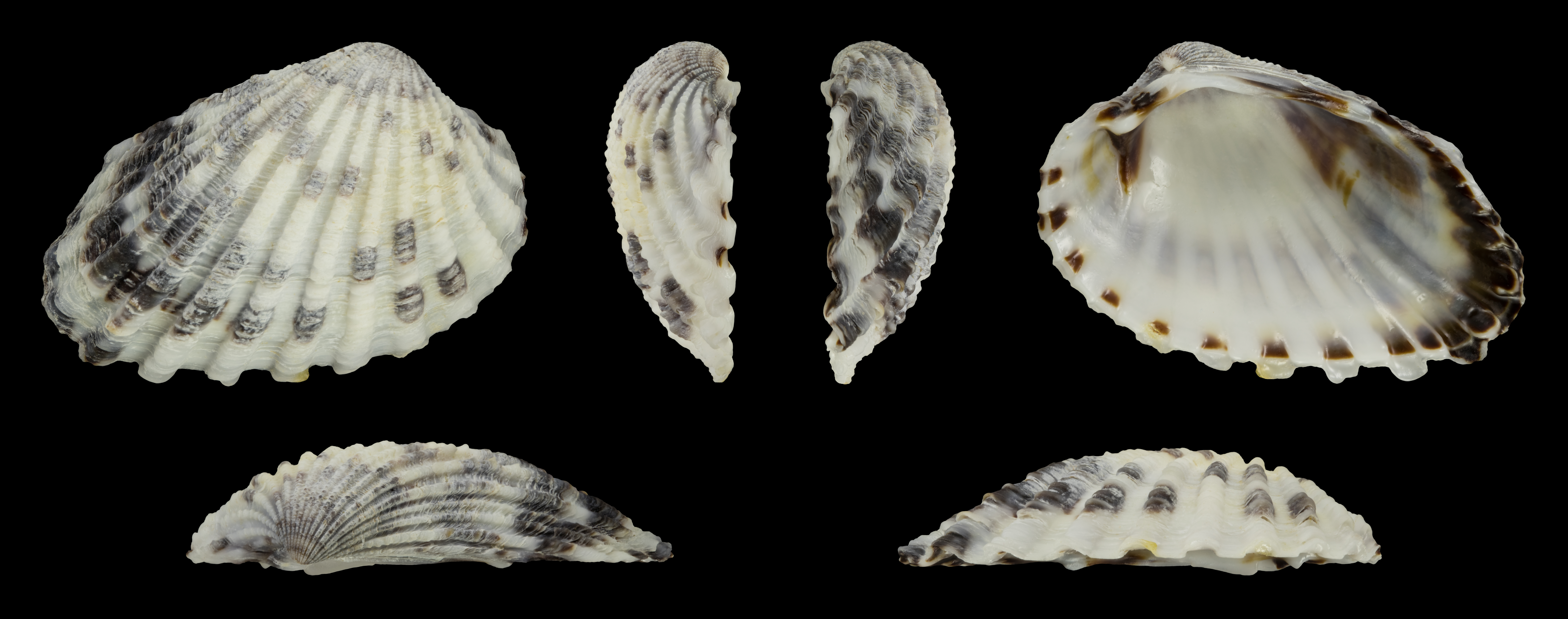
Right valve

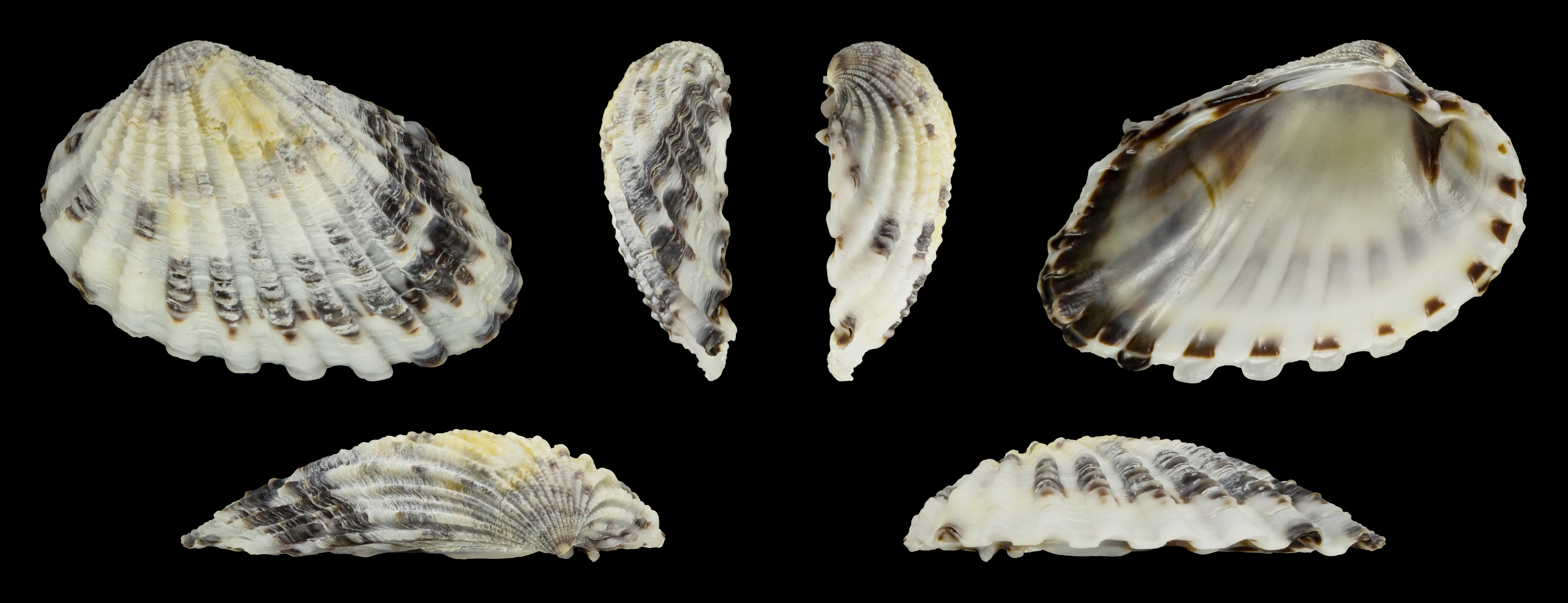
Left valve

Cardites floridanus var. albus
Right and left valve of the same specimen:

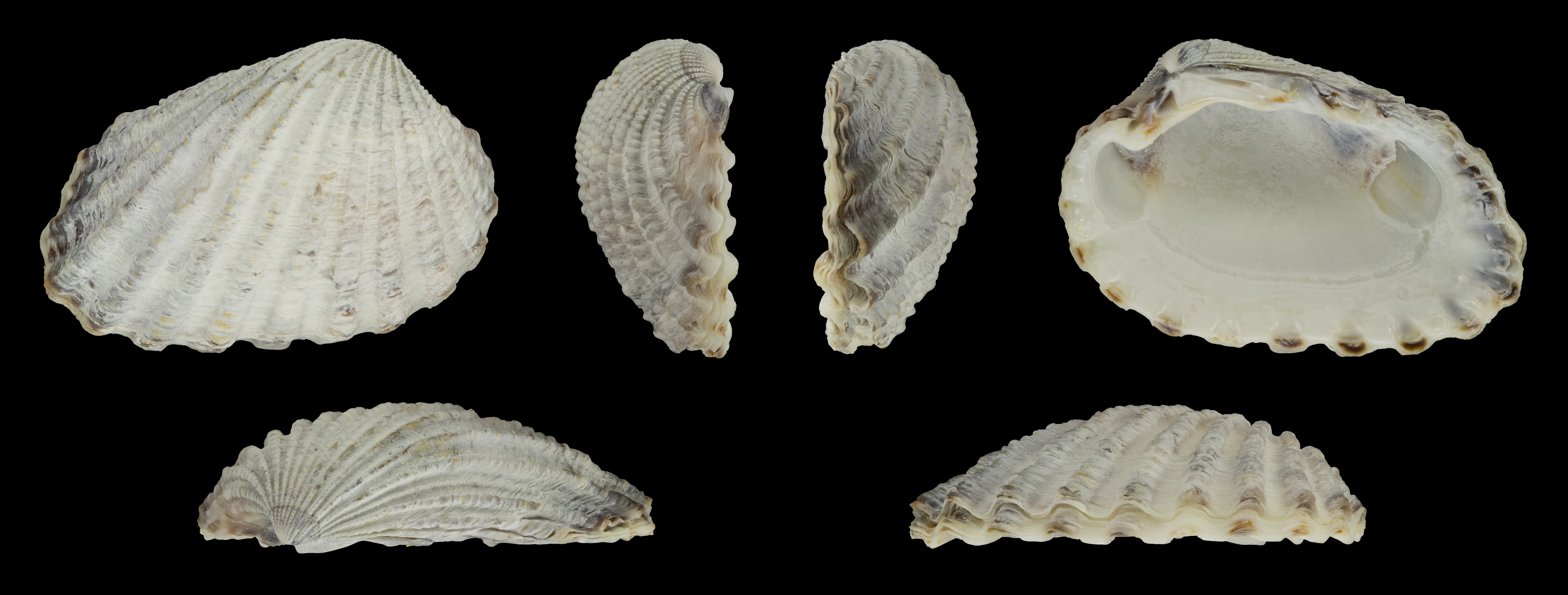
Right valve

Left valve
