= Cyclocardia elegans =

Cyclocardia elegans Temporal range: Eocene

Scientific classification
- Kingdom: Animalia
- Phylum: Mollusca
- Class: Bivalvia
- Order: Carditida
- Superfamily: Carditoidea
- Family: Carditidae
- Genus: Cyclocardia
- Species: †C. elegans

Binomial name
- †Cyclocardia elegans Lamarck, 1806

Synonyms
- Cyclocardia (Arcturellina) elegans (Lamarck, 1806); Cardita elegans (Lamarck, 1806); Cardita elegans (Requien, 1848); Cardita (Venericardia) elegans (Lamarck, 1806); Venericardia elegans

Extinct species of bivalve

Cyclocardia elegans is an extinct species of clam in the family Carditidae.

The specimen MNHN.F.J07579 was found at Parc de l'Institut national agronomique, in Thiverval-Grignon, Yvelines, France.
