= Cardita elegans =

Cardita elegans may refer to:

- Cardita elegans (Lamarck, 1806), a synonym for Cyclocardia elegans, an extinct species of clam
- Cardita elegans (Requien, 1848), a synonym for Centrocardita aculeata, a species of clam
