= Thecalia =

Scientific classification
- Domain: Eukaryota
- Kingdom: Animalia
- Phylum: Mollusca
- Class: Bivalvia
- Order: Carditida
- Family: Carditidae
- Genus: Thecalia; H.Adams & A.Adams, 1857
- Species: T. concamerata

Binomial name
- Thecalia concamerata (Gmelin, 1791)

Genus of bivalves

Thecalia is a monotypic genus of bivalves belonging to the family Carditidae. The only species is Thecalia concamerata. T. concamerata is also known as "dead mans hands"

The species is found in Southern Africa from Port Nolloth on the West Coast to Transkei.

The shell is small, approximately rectangular, with rough ribs radiating from the hinge The ventral edge of the shell id folded inwards to form a brood chamber.
