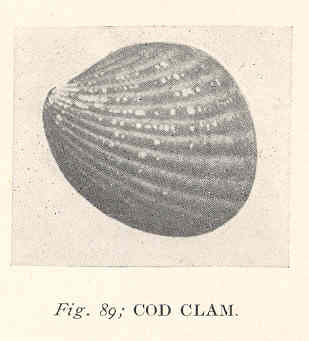

Scientific classification
- Kingdom: Animalia
- Phylum: Mollusca
- Class: Bivalvia
- Order: Carditida
- Family: Carditidae
- Genus: Cyclocardia; Conrad, 1867

Synonyms
- Arcturus Humphrey in Sowerby, 1839 (non Latreille, 1829: preoccupied); Bendeglans Eames, 1957; Crassicardia Savitsky, 1979 and see text

= Cyclocardia =

Genus of bivalves

Cyclocardia is a genus of molluscs in the family Carditidae.

The related genus Vimentum is sometimes included here.

== Species ==
- Cyclocardia astartoides (Martens, 1878)
- †Cyclocardia awamoensis (Harris, 1897)
- Cyclocardia bailyi (J. Q. Burch, 1944)
- Cyclocardia barbarensis (Stearns, 1890)
- Cyclocardia beebei (Hertlein, 1958)
- Cyclocardia borealis – northern cardita
- †Cyclocardia christiei (Marwick, 1929)
- Cyclocardia compressa (Reeve, 1843)
- Cyclocardia congelascens (Melvill & Standen, 1912)
- Cyclocardia crassidens (Broderip & Sowerby I, 1829)
- Cyclocardia crebricostata (A. Krause, 1885)
- Cyclocardia dalek Pérez & Del Río, 2017
- Cyclocardia gouldii (Dall, 1903)
- †Cyclocardia granulata (Say, 1824)
- Cyclocardia incisa (Dall, 1903)
- Cyclocardia isaotakii (Tiba, 1972)
- †Cyclocardia magna Quilty, Darragh, Gallagher & Harding, 2016
- †Cyclocardia marama (P. A. Maxwell, 1969)
- Cyclocardia moniliata (Dall, 1903)
- †Cyclocardia moniligena Hickman, 2015
- Cyclocardia nipponensis M. Huber, 2010
- Cyclocardia novangliae (E. S. Morse, 1869)
- Cyclocardia ovata (Riabinina, 1952)
- †Cyclocardia pseutella (Marwick, 1929)
- Cyclocardia ripensis Popov & Scarlato, 1980
- Cyclocardia rjabininae (Scarlato, 1955)
- Cyclocardia spurca (G.B. Sowerby I, 1833)
- Cyclocardia thouarsii (d'Orbigny, 1842)
- Cyclocardia umnaka (Willett, 1932)
- Cyclocardia velutina (E.A. Smith, 1881)
- Cyclocardia ventricosa (Gould, 1850)

Extinct species

- †Cyclocardia elegans Lamarck 1806
