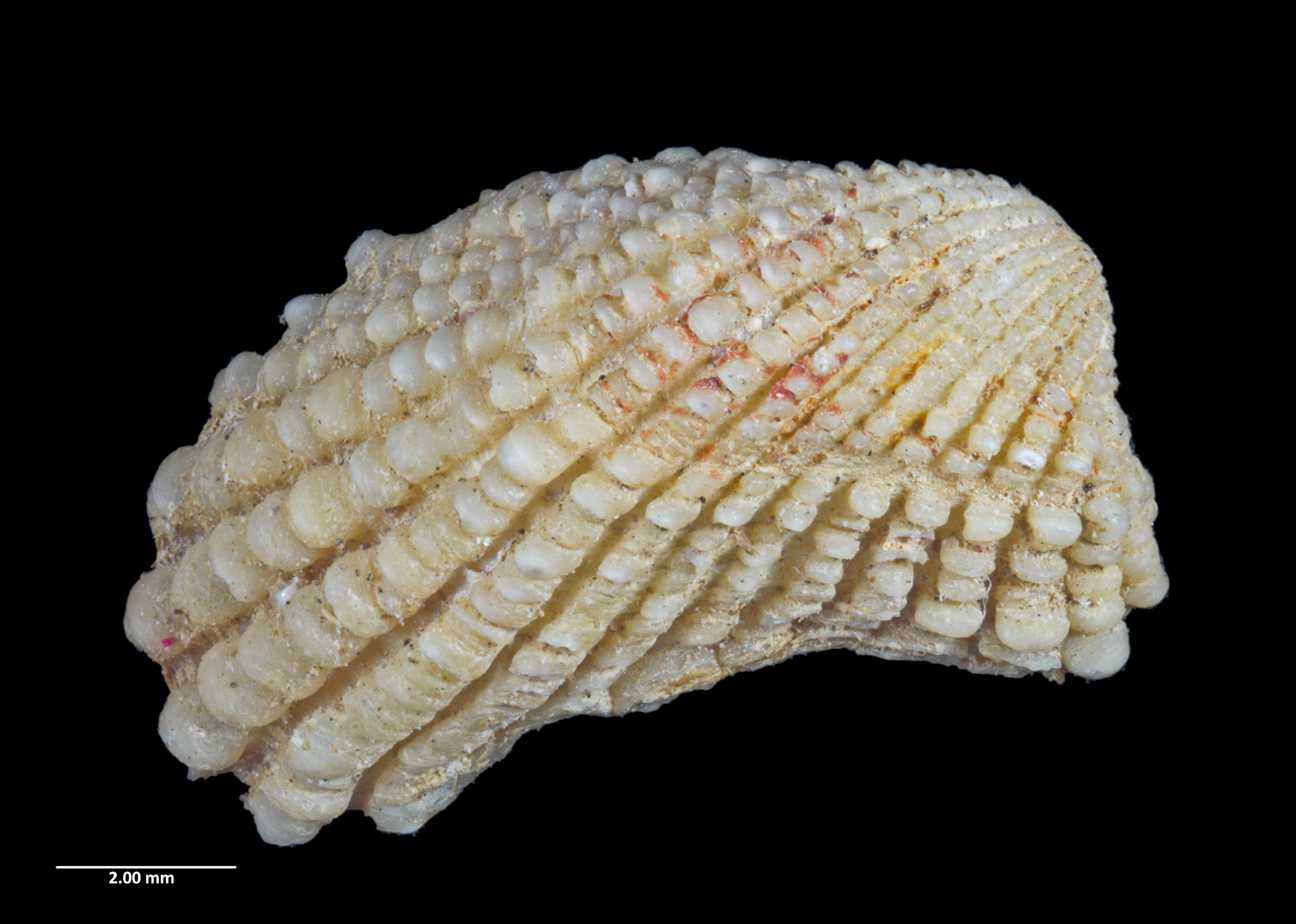
- preserved valve

Scientific classification
- Kingdom: Animalia
- Phylum: Mollusca
- Class: Bivalvia
- Order: Carditida
- Family: Carditidae
- Genus: Powellina; M. Huber, 2010
- Species: P. brookesi

Binomial name
- Powellina brookesi (Finlay, 1926)

Synonyms
- Cardita brookesi H. J. Finlay, 1926 superseded combination

= Powellina =

Species of bivalve

Powellina brookesi is a bivalve mollusc of the family Carditidae, endemic to the north east coast of the North Island of New Zealand including Great Barrier Island and the Mercury Islands. It is the only species in the genus Powellina.
