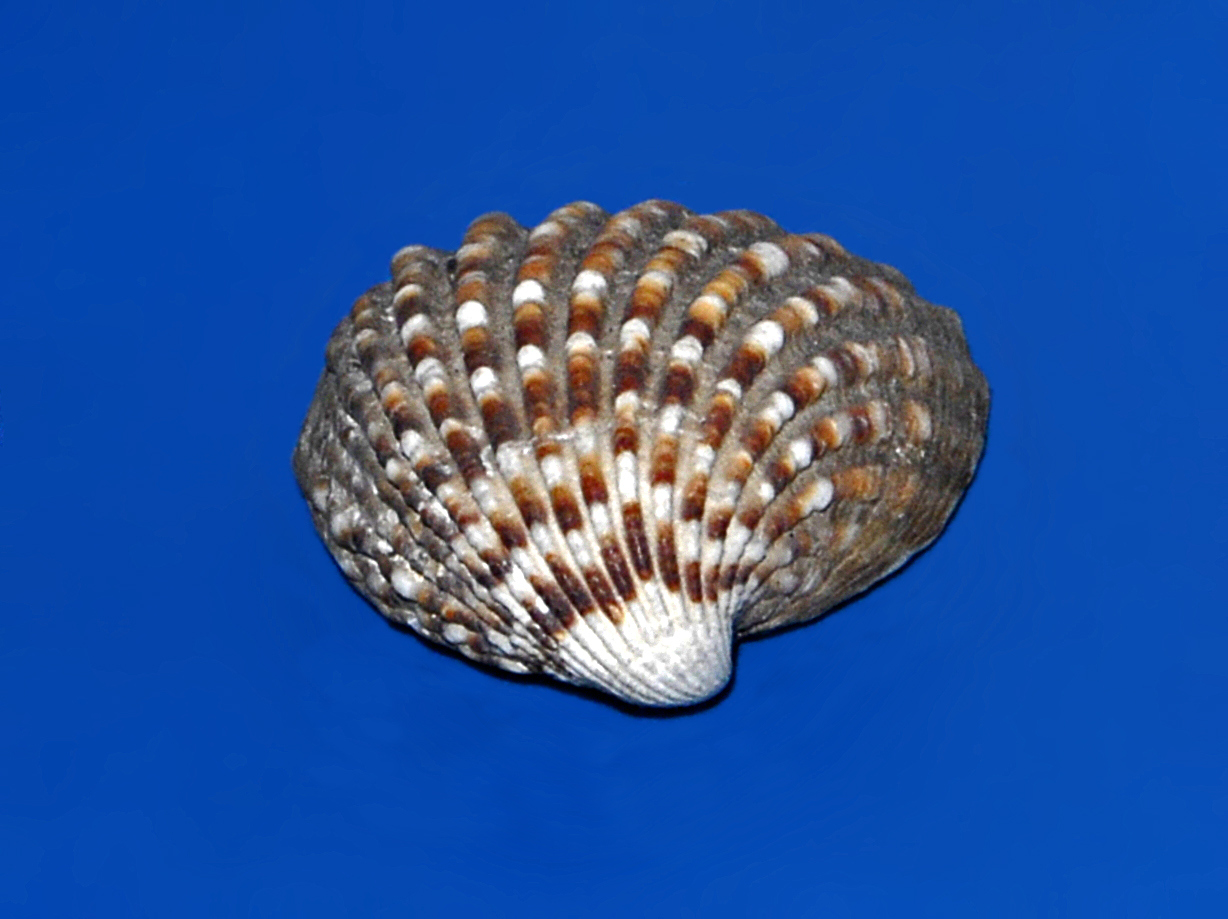
- Shell of Cardites antiquatus from Sardinia at the Museo Civico di Storia Naturale di Milano

Scientific classification
- Kingdom: Animalia
- Phylum: Mollusca
- Class: Bivalvia
- Order: Carditida
- Superfamily: Carditoidea
- Family: Carditidae
- Genus: Cardites; Link, 1807

= Cardites =

Genus of bivalves

Cardites is a genus of marine bivalve molluscs, in the family Carditidae.

== Species ==
- Cardites antiquatus (Linnaeus, 1758)
- Cardites bicolor (Lamarck, 1819)
- Cardites canaliculatus (Reeve, 1843)
- Cardites cooperi (Melvill, 1909)
- Cardites crassicostatus (G. B. Sowerby I, 1825)
- Cardites cumingii (Deshayes, 1854)
- Cardites floridanus (Conrad, 1838)
- Cardites grayi (Dall, 1903)
- Cardites laticostatus (G. B. Sowerby I, 1833)
- Cardites micellus (Penna-Neme, 1971)
- Cardites nitidus (Reeve, 1843)
- Cardites ovalis (Reeve, 1843)
- Cardites rufus (Deshayes in Laborde & Linant, 1834)
- Cardites umbonatus (G. B. Sowerby III, 1904)
