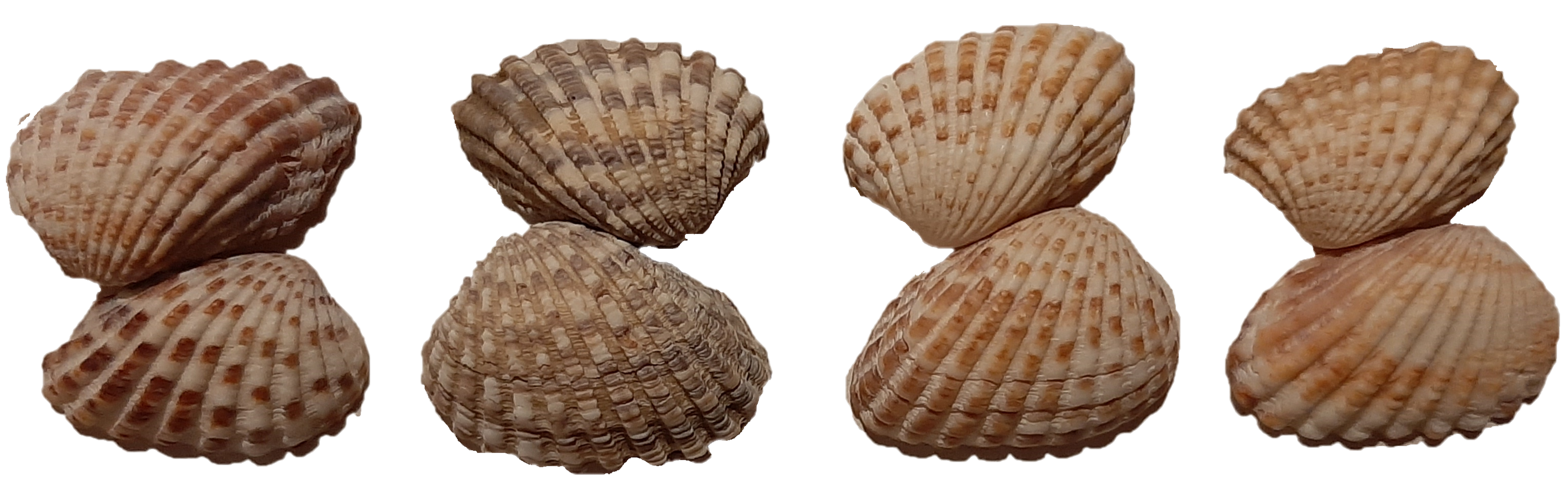
- Cardita floridana

Scientific classification
- Kingdom: Animalia
- Phylum: Mollusca
- Class: Bivalvia
- Order: Carditida
- Family: Carditidae
- Genus: Cardita; Bruguière, 1792

Species
- See text

Synonyms
- Arcinella Oken, 1815 (non Schumacher, 1817: non-binomial); Cardites Lamarck, 1801 (non Link, 1807: nomen rejectum); Herterocarda (lapsus); Heterocarda Rafinesque, 1815; Jesonia Gray, 1847 (non Gray, 1840: nomen nudum); Mytilicadia (lapsus); Mytilicardes (lapsus); Mytilicardia Herrmannsen, 1847; Mytilicardita Anton, 1838

= Cardita =

Genus of bivalves

Cardita is a genus of marine bivalve molluscs in the family Carditidae.

== Naming ==
Especially in the early 19th century, this genus was often confused with the Carditid genus Cardites. Cardita was originally established by J.G. Bruguière in 1792. However, in 1801 Jean-Baptiste Lamarck described it under the name Cardites. J.H.F. Link subsequently described a new genus using the name Cardites in 1807. When this homonymy was realised, Megerle in 1811 re-described Link's genus Cardites as Cardita.

Megerle's action resulted in four technically valid names which formed two mutual pairs of homonyms. The matter was ultimately resolved by starting with the oldest name – that of Bruguière – and applying it as intended, and suppressing Lamarck's name so that Link's junior homonym could be used for Cardites.

In addition to the numerous junior synonyms, Byssomera – a junior synonym or subgenus of Carditamera – has sometimes been written as a subgenus of Cardita, due to its type species having been synonymised from Cardita (Byssomera) affinis to Carditamera (Byssomera) affinis.

== Species ==
According to the WoRMS as of April 2019:

- Cardita aviculina Lamarck, 1819
- Cardita caliculaeformis Deshayes in Maillard, 1863
- Cardita calyculata (Linnaeus, 1758)
- Cardita crassicosta Lamarck, 1819
- Cardita distorta Reeve, 1843
- Cardita excisa Philippi, 1847
- Cardita ffinchi (Melvill, 1898)
- Cardita hawaiensis (Dall, Bartsch & Rehder, 1938)
- Cardita kyushuensis (Okutani, 1963)
- Cardita leana Dunker, 1860
- †Cardita marwicki Laws, 1944
- Cardita muricata G.B. Sowerby I, 1833
- †Cardita northcrofti Marwick, 1928
- Cardita pica Reeve, 1843
- Cardita senegalensis Reeve, 1843
- Cardita variegata Bruguière, 1792
- Cardita vinsoni Viader, 1951
