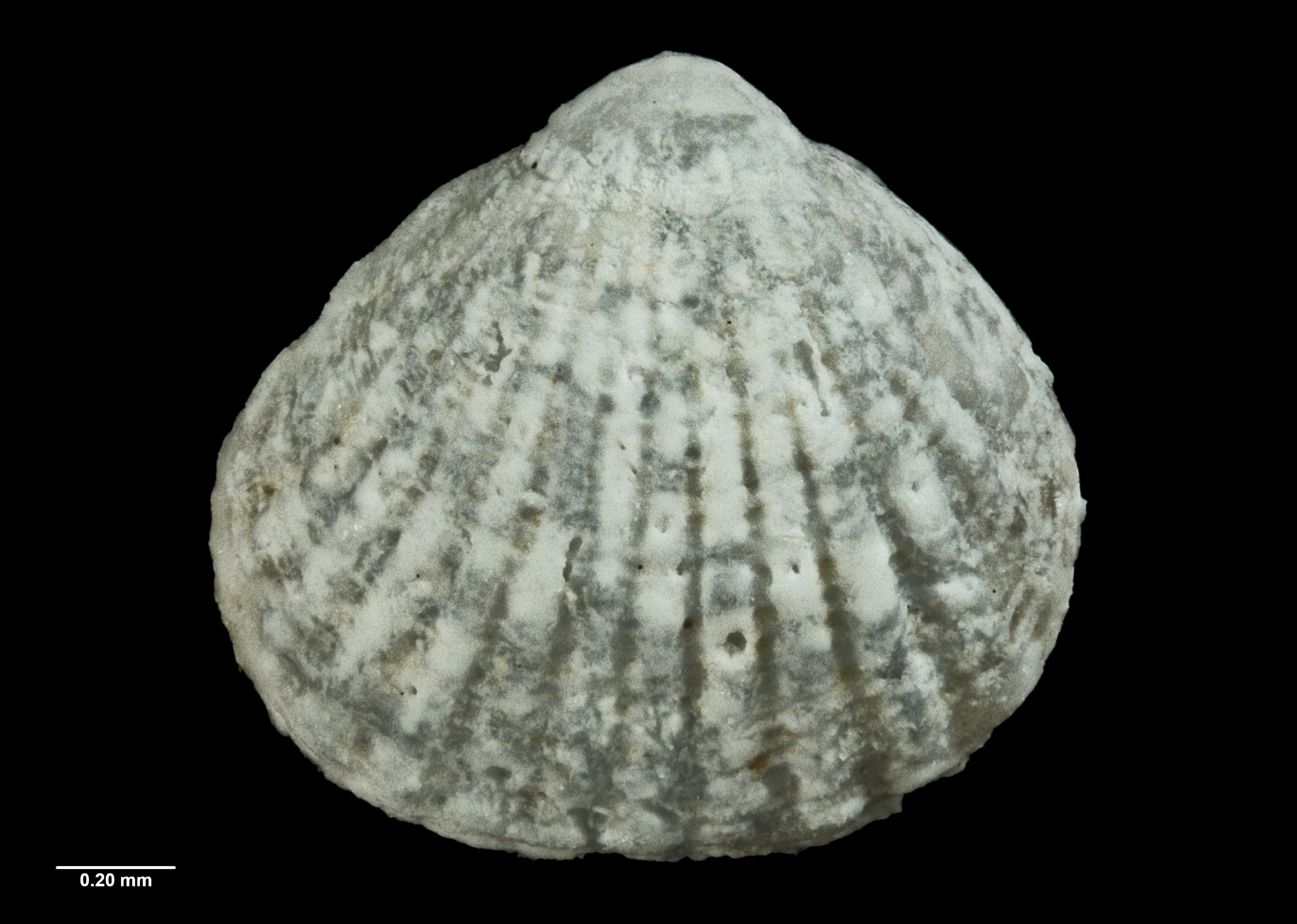
- Condylocardia pectinata chathamensis

Scientific classification
- Kingdom: Animalia
- Phylum: Mollusca
- Class: Bivalvia
- Order: Carditida
- Family: Condylocardiidae
- Subfamily: Condylocardiinae
- Genus: Condylocardia; F. Bernard, 1896

Type species
- Condylocardia sanctipauli F. Bernard, 1896

Species
- 28 (see text)

Synonyms
- Hippella Mörch, 1861; Radiocondyla Iredale, 1936

= Condylocardia =

Genus of clams

Condylocardia is a genus of marine clams in the family Condylocardiidae. It is sometimes placed in the subfamily Condylocardiinae. It was described in 1896 by F. Bernard, along with its type species Condylocardia sanctipauli.

== Species ==
As of 2024, the genus has 28 species:

- Condylocardia ameliae C. Salas & Cosel, 1991
- Condylocardia angolensis C. Salas & Cosel, 1991
- Condylocardia angusticostata Zelaya, Güller & Bieler, 2024
- †Condylocardia atomus (Deshayes, 1858)
- Condylocardia australis F. Bernard, 1896
- Condylocardia boucheti C. Salas & Cosel, 1991
- Condylocardia bravensis C. Salas & Rolán, 1990
- Condylocardia carditoides C. Salas & Rolán, 1990
- Condylocardia cometa Middlefart, 2002
- Condylocardia crassicosta F. Bernard, 1896
- †Condylocardia dalli Bernard, 1897
- Condylocardia damara Zettler & L. Hoffman, 2023
- Condylocardia digueti E. Lamy, 1917
- Condylocardia elongata Coan, 2003
- Condylocardia fernandina Coan, 2003
- Condylocardia geigeri Coan, 2003
- Condylocardia hippopus (Mörch, 1861)
- Condylocardia kaiserae Coan, 2003
- Condylocardia koolsae Coan, 2003
- Condylocardia limaeformis Cotton, 1930
- Condylocardia notoaustralis Cotton, 1930
- Condylocardia pectinata (Tate & May, 1900)
- Condylocardia rectangularis Cotton, 1930
- Condylocardia sanctipauli F. Bernard, 1896
- Condylocardia sparsa Coan, 2003
- †Condylocardia tenuicostae Chapman & Gabriel, 1914
- Condylocardia tridacniformis C. Salas & Rolán, 1990
- Condylocardia verdensis C. Salas & Rolán, 1990
