= Castle Hayne Limestone =

Geologic formation in North Carolina, US

- Stratigraphic range: Lutetian/early Bartonian, 45–40 Ma
- Type: Formation
- Unit of: Jackson Group
- Sub-units: New Hanover Member, Comfort Member, Spring Garden Member
- Underlies: River Bend Formation, Belgrade Formation
- Overlies: Peedee Formation

Lithology
- Primary: limestone
- Other: marl

Location
- Region: North Carolina
- Country: United States

Type section
- Named for: Castle Hayne, North Carolina

The Castle Hayne Limestone (also called the Castle Hayne Formation) is a middle Eocene-aged geologic formation in North Carolina, USA. It consists of cobble to pebble sized clasts, usually rounded, coated with phosphate and glauconite in a limestone matrix. The formation has been dated to the middle Eocene, but its exact age remains uncertain; however, it is generally thought to date to the Lutetian or early Bartonian.

== Description ==
The Castle Hayne Formation is divided into three submembers: the New Hanover member, the Comfort Member, and the Spring Garden Member. The New Hanover member is the oldest member and is characterizes by cobbles and pebbles, fine sand, glauconite, and phosphate in a fine limestone matrix. The most common fossils are shark and ray teeth. Index fossils place this member in the middle Eocene. The Comfort member lies above the New Hanover member. It contains bryozoa and sea urchin fossils and beds of glauconite and phosphate pebbles that mark breaks in deposition. The Comfort member was deposited in the late middle Eocene and is overlain by the Spring Garden member. The Spring Garden member is a siliceous rock cemented with calcite and containing detrital phosphate. Mollusc bivalves account for up to 75% of the composition in some areas and molds of molluscs shells filled with silica are common. Index fossils indicate this member was also deposited in the late middle Eocene.

== Vertebrate paleobiota ==
Based on the Paleobiology Database:

=== Cartilaginous fish ===
==== Sharks ====
Sharks of the Castle Hayne Limestone
Genus	Species	Member	Material	Notes	Images
Anomotodon	A. novus			A goblin shark.	
Brachycarcharias	B. koerti			A sand shark.	
Macrorhizodus	M. americanus (=Isurus americanus)			A lamnid mackerel shark.	
Odontaspis	O. sp.			A sand shark.	
Otodus	O. angustidens			A megatooth shark.	
Striatolamia	S. macrota			A sand shark.	

==== Rays ====
Rays of the Castle Hayne Limestone
Genus	Species	Member	Material	Notes	Images
Dasyatidae indet.				A whiptail stingray of uncertain affinities.	
Myliobatis	M. sp.			An eagle ray.	
Pristis	P. curvidens			A sawfish.	
Rhinoptera	R. sp.			A cownose ray.	

=== Ray-finned fish ===
Ray-finned fish of the Castle Hayne Limestone
Genus	Species	Member	Material	Notes	Images
Carangidae indet.				A jackfish.	
Cylindracanthus	C. sp.		Rostra	A fish of uncertain affinities.	
Xiphiorhynchus	X. antiquus			A xiphiid billfish, related to modern swordfish.	

=== Mammals ===
==== Cetaceans ====
Cetaceans of the Castle Hayne Limestone
Genus	Species	Member	Material	Notes	Images
Crenatocetus	C. rayi	Comfort		A protocetid. Type locality for this genus.	
Cynthiacetus	C. maxwelli			A basilosaurid.	
Pachycetus	P. wardii			A basilosaurid.	
?Remingtonocetidae indet.			A tooth.	A potential remingtonocetid. Possibly the first record of this family from North America, and provides evidence that this family had a trans-Atlantic distribution.	

==== Sirenians ====
Sirenians of the Castle Hayne Limestone
Genus	Species	Member	Notes	Images
Protosiren	P. sp		A protosirenid sirenian.	

== Invertebrate paleobiota ==
=== Molluscs ===
Genera	Species	Notes	Images
Chione	C. sp		
Crassatella	C. wilcoxi C. sp	A crassatellid bivalve.	
Ensis	E. sp		
Flemingostrea	F. sp		
Giganostrea	G. trigonalis	An extinct group of oyster.	
Glyptoactis	G. sp		
Panopea	P. sp	A close relative of the modern geoduck.	
Pecten	P. membranosus	An extinct bivalve that belonged to the same genus as most modern scallops.	
Pholadomya	P. sp		
Plicatula	P. filamentosa		
Venericardia	V. sp		

=== Cephalopods ===
Genera	Species	Notes	Images
Anomalosaepia	A. vernei A. mariettani A. alleni A. andreane A. sp	An extinct group of cuttlefish that was also found in Egypt and belonged to the family Anomalosaepiidae.	
Aturia	A. alabamensis	Belongs in its own family: the Aturiidae.	
Beloptera	B. sp	Another extinct group of cuttlefish that was found in several localities in Europe.	
Conchorhynchus	C. furrus	Has not been classified into any specific cephalopod group yet.	
Eutrephoceras	E. carolinensis	First originated during the Cretaceous period.	E. dorbignyanum, a related species.
Rhyncolites	R. sp R. minimus R. aturensis	An extinct group of nautiloid that has not yet been classified into any specific family.	

== See also ==
- List of fossiliferous stratigraphic units in North Carolina
