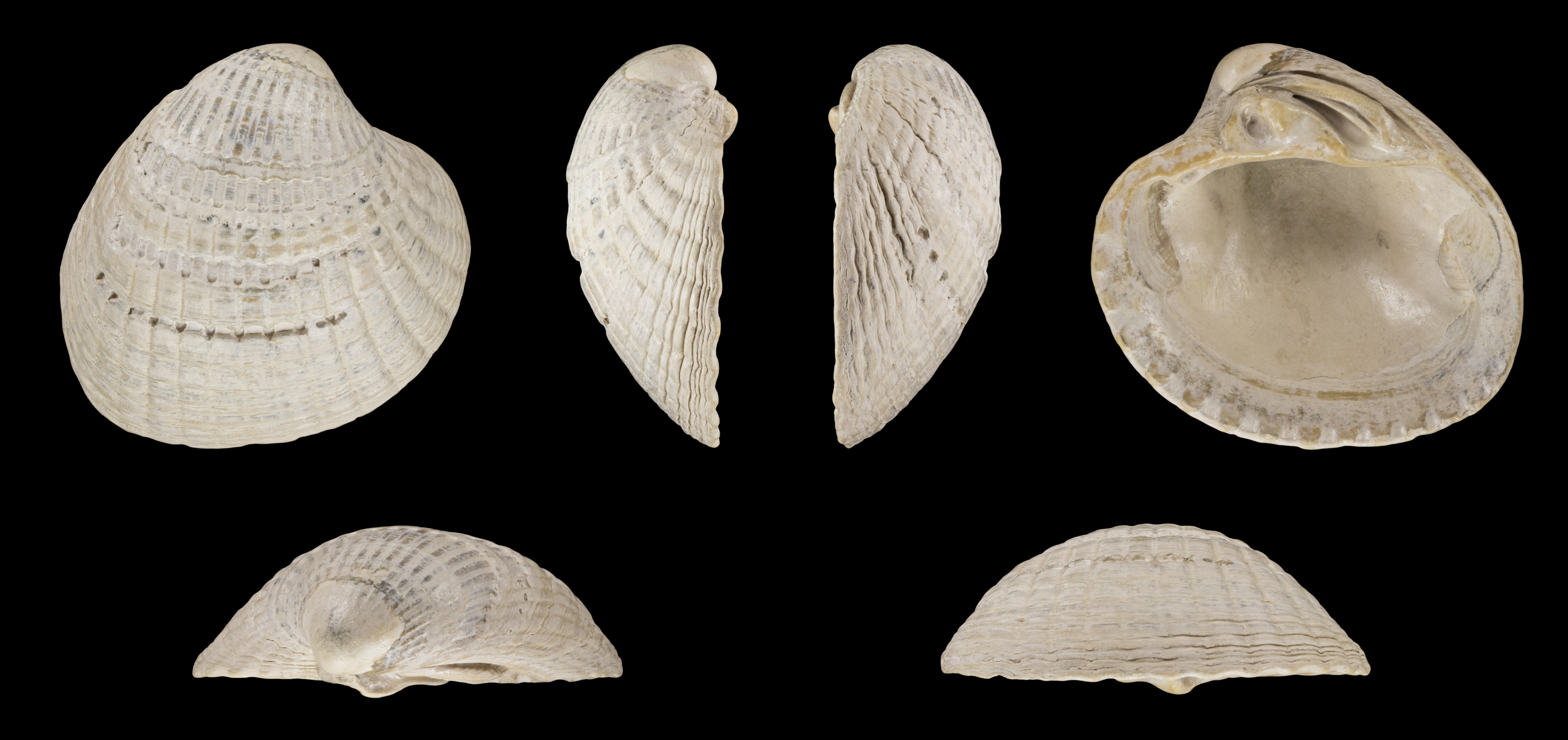
- Venericardia planicosta Lamarck, 1806 – currently accepted as Venericor planicosta

Scientific classification
- Kingdom: Animalia
- Phylum: Mollusca
- Class: Bivalvia
- Order: Carditida
- Superfamily: Carditoidea
- Family: Carditidae
- Genus: Venericardia; Lamarck, 1801

Type species
- †Venus imbricata Gmelin, 1791

Synonyms
- Cardita (Venericardia) Lamarck, 1801 (superseded rank); Venericardita (incorrect subsequent spelling); Venericardium (ditto)

= Venericardia =

Venericardia Temporal range: Early Jurassic to Recent, 192.9–0 Ma

Genus of bivalves

Venericardia is a genus of marine bivalves in the family Carditidae.

== Species ==
Venericardia contains one living species:

- Venericardia columnaria Hedley & May, 1908 – Australia

There are numerous species known only from the fossil record, including the type species of the genus, Venericardia imbricata (Gmelin, 1791).
