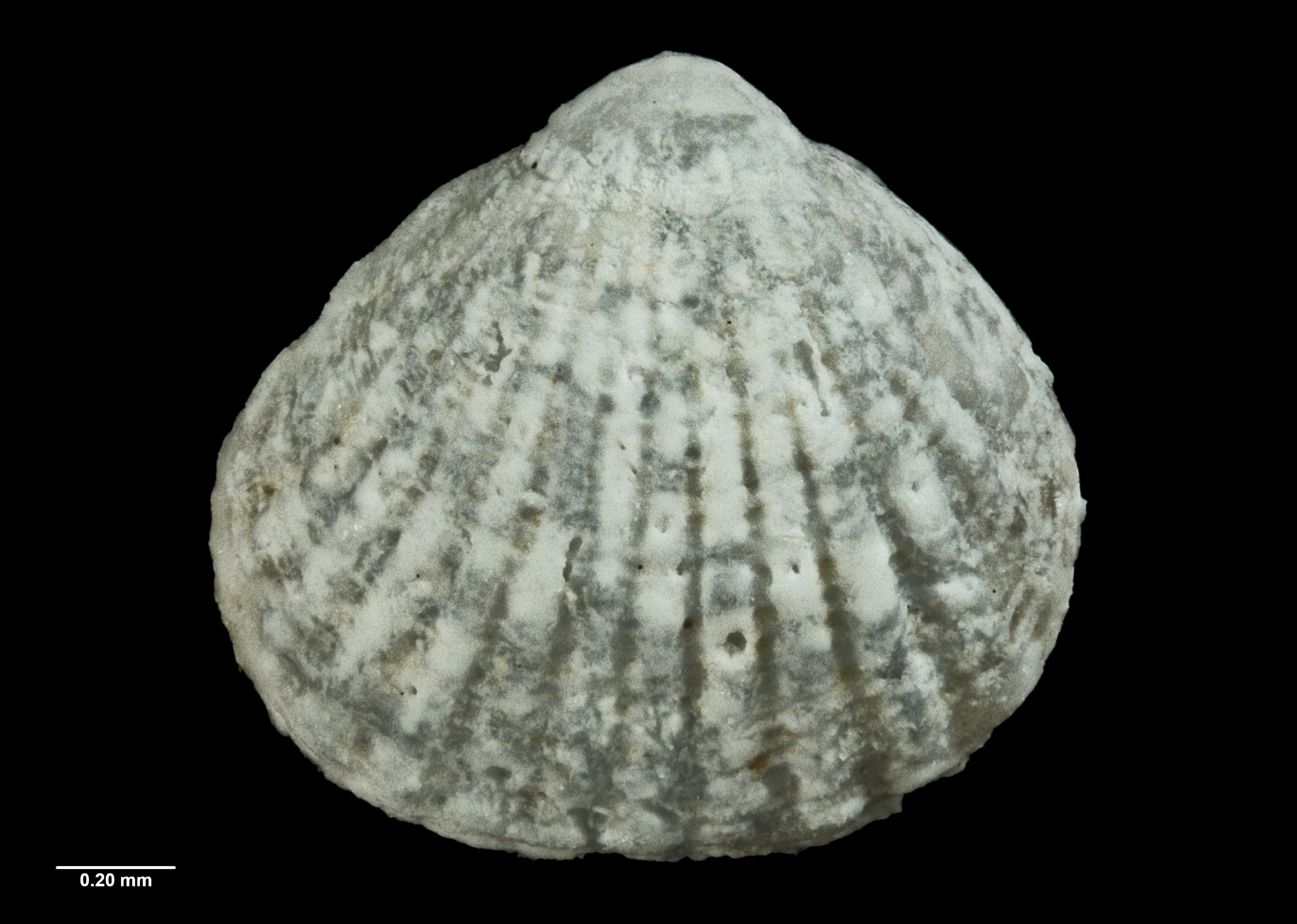
- Condylocardia pectinata chathamensis

Scientific classification
- Kingdom: Animalia
- Phylum: Mollusca
- Class: Bivalvia
- Order: Carditida
- Superfamily: Carditoidea
- Family: Condylocardiidae; Lamarck, 1809

Genera
- See text

= Condylocardiidae =

Family of bivalves

Condylocardiidae is a family of small marine bivalve clams of the order Carditida.

== Genera ==
- Benthocardiella Powell, 1930
- Carditella E. A. Smith, 1881
- Carditopsis E. A. Smith, 1881
- Condylocardia Bernard, 1896
- Condylocuna Iredale, 1896
- Cuna Hedley, 1902
