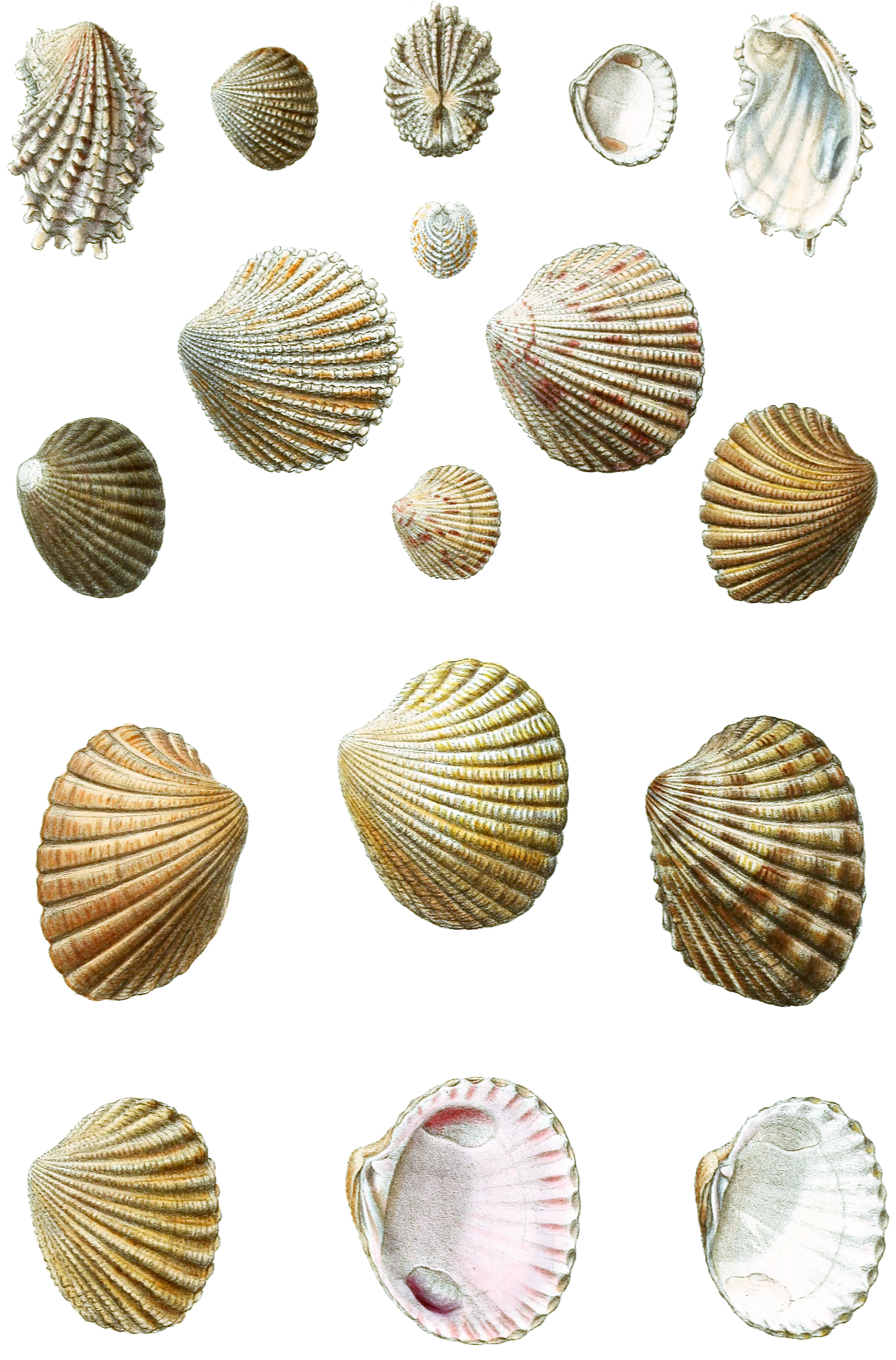
- Shells of several Carditidae species

Scientific classification
- Kingdom: Animalia
- Phylum: Mollusca
- Class: Bivalvia
- Order: Carditida
- Superfamily: Carditoidea
- Family: Carditidae; Férussac, 1822

Subfamilies
- See text

= Carditidae =

Family of bivalves

Carditidae is a family of marine bivalve clams of the order Carditida, which was long included in the Venerida. They are the type taxon of the superfamily Carditoidea.

Carditidae is a neglected and poorly classified family. It has six subfamilies recognised by the World Register of Marine Species, but the WoRMS has refrained from assigning contents to any family due to ambiguity and overlap in their definitions. Additionally, several genera have been or are still considered subgenera of other genera by some authors.

== Genera ==
The genera of Carditidae recognised by the World Register of Marine Species as of April 2019 are:

- Akardita La Perna, Brunetti & Della Bella, 2018
- Arcturellina Chavan, 1951
- Bathycardita Iredale, 1924
- Beguina Röding, 1798
- Cardiocardita Anton, 1838
- Cardita Bruguière, 1792
- Carditamera
- Carditellopsis Iredale, 1936
- Cardites Link, 1807
- Centrocardita Sacco, 1899
- †Choniocardia Cossmann, 1904
- †Claibornicardia Stenzel & Krause, 1957
- Coripia de Gregorio, 1885
- Cuna Hedley, 1902
  - Cuna aupouri Powell, 1937
  - Cuna carditelloides Suter, 1911
  - Cuna compressidens Powell, 1933
  - Cuna gibbosa Powell, 1937
  - Cuna laqueus Finlay, 1927
  - Cuna manawatawhia Powell, 1937
  - Cuna mayi Powell, 1930
  - Cuna mendica Dell, 1952
  - Cuna mayi Powell, 1930
  - Cuna otagoensis Powell, 1927
- Cyclocardia
- Glans Megerle von Mühlfeld, 1811
- Glyptoactis Stewart, 1930
- †Goosensia Cossmann, 1885
- Hamacuna Cotton, 1931
- Lazariella Sacco, 1899
- Megacardita Sacco, 1899
- Milneria Dall, 1881
- †Miodomeris Chavan, 1936
- Miodontiscus Dall, 1903
- †Paraglans Chavan, 1941
- Pleuromeris
- Powellina Huber, 2010
- Pteromeris
- Purpurocardia Maxwell, 1969
- Strophocardia Olsson, 1961
- Thecalia H. Adams & A. Adams, 1857
- †Tutcheria Cox, 1946
- †Venericardia
- †Venericor Stewart, 1930
- Vimentum Iredale, 1925

Synonyms:

- Arcturella Chavan, 1941 is a junior synonym of Arcturellina. It is not to be confused with Arcturella Sars, 1879, which is a junior synonym of the isopod genus Astacilla.
- Azarella is a junior synonym of Beguina.
- Agaria, Cardiocardites [sic] and Divergidens are junior synonyms of Cardiocardita.
- Actinobolus Mörch, 1853 is a junior synonym of Cardites. It is not to be confused with the rhinoceros beetle genus Actinobolus Westwood, 1842.
- Ceropsis Dall, 1871 is a junior synonym of Milneria. It should not be confused with the true weevil genus Ceropsis.
- Miodon Carpenter, 1863 is a junior synonym of Miodontiscus. It should not be confused with Miodon Duméril, 1859, which is a junior synonym of the mole viper genus Polemon.

Notes:

- In some classifications, Bathycardita is a subgenus of Cardiocardita.
- In some classifications, Centrocardita is a subgenus of Glans.
- In some classifications, Claibornicardia is a subgenus of either Glyptoactis or Venericardia.
- In some classifications, Vimentum is a subgenus of Cyclocardia.
- In some classifications prior to the 2000s, Carditella was included in Carditidae, but it has since been moved to Condylocardiidae, along with its former junior synonym/subgenus (now independent genus) Carditellona.
- Increasingly in several 2010s classifications, the subgenus Venericardia (†Baluchicardia) Rutsch and Schenck 1943 is considered an independent genus.

== Subfamilies ==
=== Chavan, 1969 ===
The original six-subfamily system was first proposed by Chavan in 1969, contain the following genera (some of which are now synonyms or classified in other families):

Carditamerinae Chavan, 1969

- Arcturellina
- Bathycardita
- Cardiocardita
- Carditamera
- Carditella
- Carditellona
- Carditellopsis
- Centrocardita
- Choniocardia
- Cossmannella
- Cretocardia
- Cyclocardia
- Fenestricardita
- Glans
- Goosensia
- Izumicardia
- Lazariella
- Miodontiscus
- Pleuromeris
- Plionema
- Scalaricardita
- Tutcheria
- Vetericardiella
- Vimentum

Carditesinae Chavan, 1969

- Baluchicardia
- Cardites
- Claibornicardia
- Glyptoactis
- Ludbrookia
- Paraglans
- Xenocardita

Carditinae Férussac, 1822

- Beguina
- Cardita
- Jesonia

Miodomeridinae Chavan, 1969

- Chavanella
- Coripia
- Miodomeris
- Pteromeris

Thecaliinae Dall, 1903

- Milneria
- Thecalia

Venericardiinae Chavan, 1969

- Leuroactis
- Megacardita
- Pacificor
- Trapezicardita
- Venericardia
- Venericor

=== Perez, 2019 ===
In 2019, D. E. Pérez proposed a seven-subfamily system for Carditidae.

Carditamerinae

- Carditamera
- Centrocardita
- Glans

Carditinae

- Beguina
- *Birkelundita
- Cardita

Miodomeridinae

- *Kolmeris
- Miodomeris
- Pteromeris

Palaeocarditinae Chavan, 1969

- *Palaeocardita
- *Schizocardita

Scalaricarditinae Pérez, 2019

- Coripia
- *Scalaricardita
- Vimentum

Thecaliinae

- Powellina
- Thecalia

Venericardiinae

- Arcturellina
- *Baluchicardia
- Bathycardita
- Cardiocardita
- Cardites
- Claibornicardia
- *Darwinicardia
- *Fasciculicardia
- Glyptoactis
- *Kalelia
- *Leuroactis
- Megacardita
- *Neovenericor
- *Pacificor
- Paraglans
- Purpurocardia
- *Rotundicardia
- Venericardia
- Venericor

* = not yet recognised by the World Register of Marine Species.

In addition, Pérez proposed possible affiliations for the genera not included in his subfamilies:

- Carditidae: Carditomantea?
- Carditinae: Goosensia?
- Cyclocardida: Ainicardita, Crassicardia, Lunulicardita
- Eucarditidae: Pseudocardia? (some species)
- Miodomeridinae: Miodontiscus
- Scalaricarditinae: Malarossia, Akardita?, Choniocardia (could be Cyclocardida)
- Stem-Carditidae: Fenestricardita?, Trapezicardita?, Gujocardita? (could be Permophoridae), Septocardia? (could be Cardiidae)
- Stem-Eucarditidae or Stem-Carditida: Izumicardia
- Venericardiini: Cossmannella, Cretocardia, Lazariella
- Venericardiinae: Cycloglans, Strophocardia, Maghrebella?, Subvenericardia?
- Uncertain: Milneria, Xenocardita

In some classifications prior to the 2000s, Carditidae used to contain a seventh subfamily Carditellinae, until it was reallocated to Condylocardiidae.
