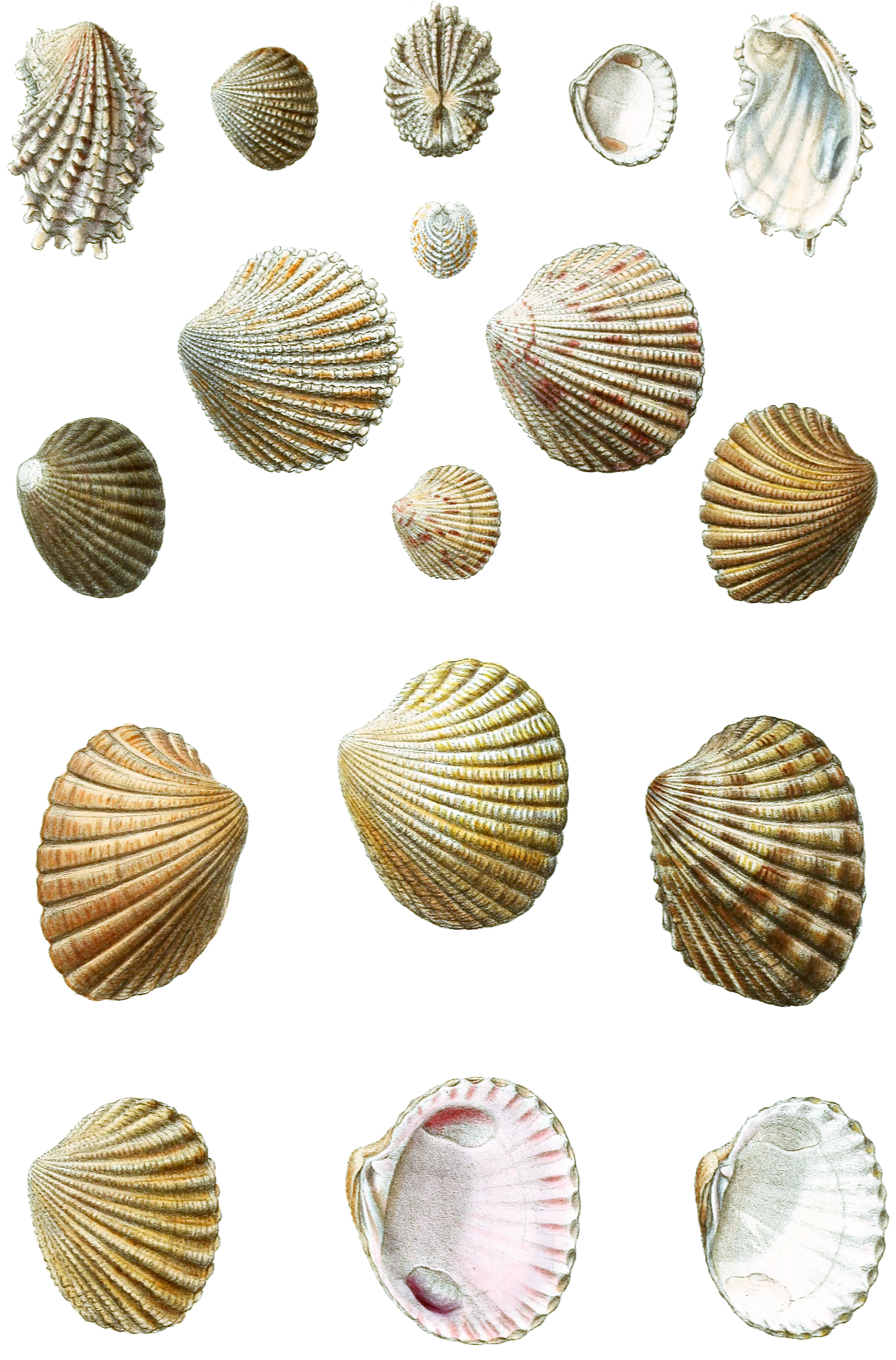
- Shells of several Carditidae species

Scientific classification
- Kingdom: Animalia
- Phylum: Mollusca
- Class: Bivalvia
- Order: Carditida
- Superfamily: Carditoidea; Fleming, 1828

Families
- See text

= Carditoidea =

Superfamily of molluscs

Carditoidea is a superfamily of marine bivalve clams.

== Families ==
According to the World Register of Marine Species:

- Carditidae
- Condylocardiidae
- Cardiniidae

Notes:

- Previously in 2010, Condylocardiidae was classified in its own superfamily, Condylocardioidea.
- In the ITIS classification, Cardiniidae is instead classified in Astartoidea.
