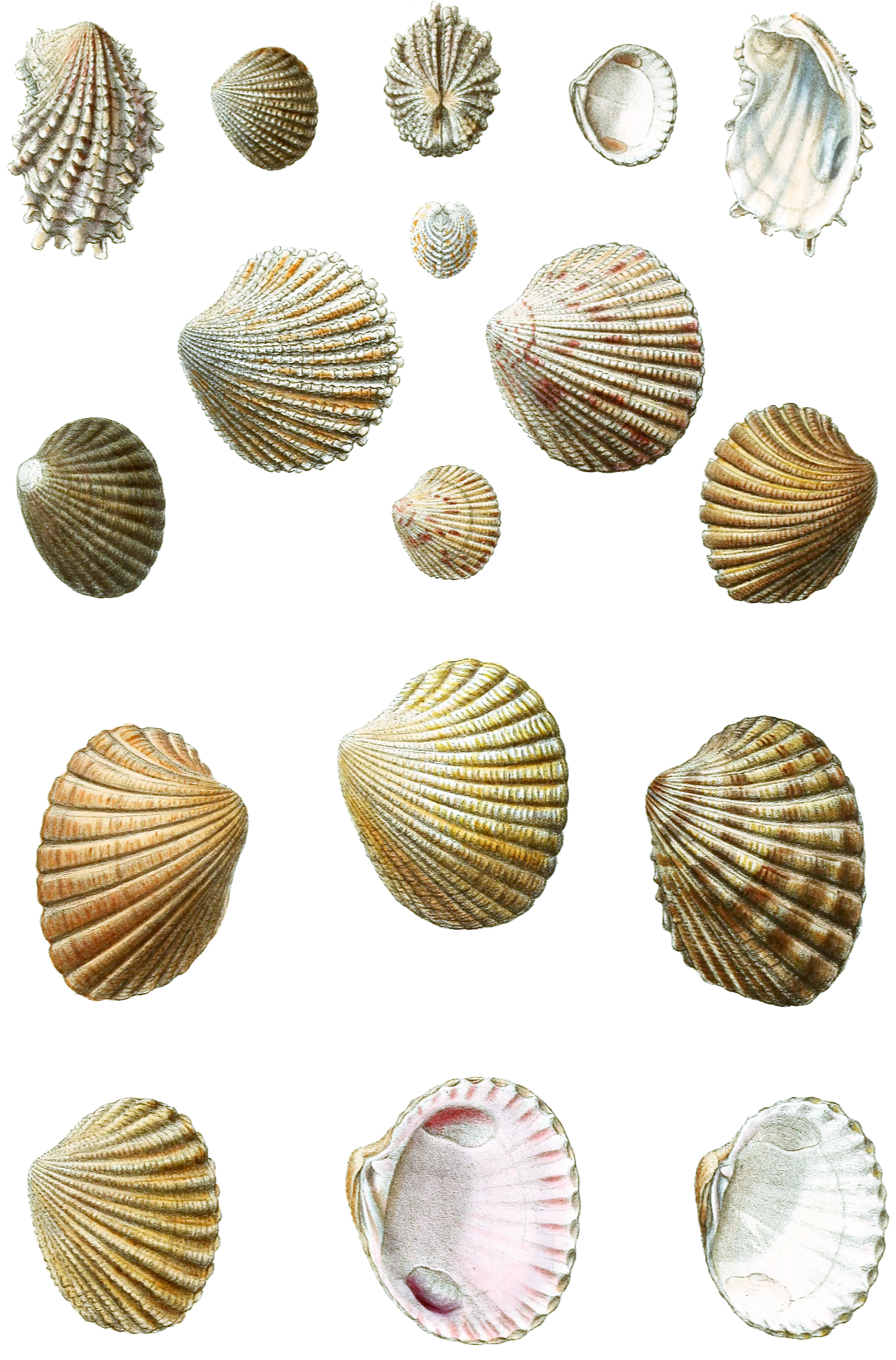
- Shells of several Carditidae species

Scientific classification
- Kingdom: Animalia
- Phylum: Mollusca
- Class: Bivalvia
- Infraclass: Heteroconchia
- Subterclass: Archiheterodonta
- Order: Carditida; Lamarck, 1809

Superfamilies
- Carditoidea; Crassatelloidea

Synonyms
- Carditoida

= Carditida =

Order of molluscs

Carditida is an order of marine bivalve clams.

== Superfamilies and families ==
According to the World Register of Marine Species:

- Family: †Archaeocardiidae
- Superfamily: Carditoidea
  - Family: Carditidae
  - Family: Condylocardiidae
- Superfamily: Crassatelloidea
  - Family: Crassatellidae
  - Family: Astartidae
- Family: †Eodonidae

Notes:

- Previously in 2010, Condylocardiidae was classified in its own superfamily, Condylocardioidea.
- Carditida does not yet exist in the ITIS classification, with its families instead being included in Venerida.
