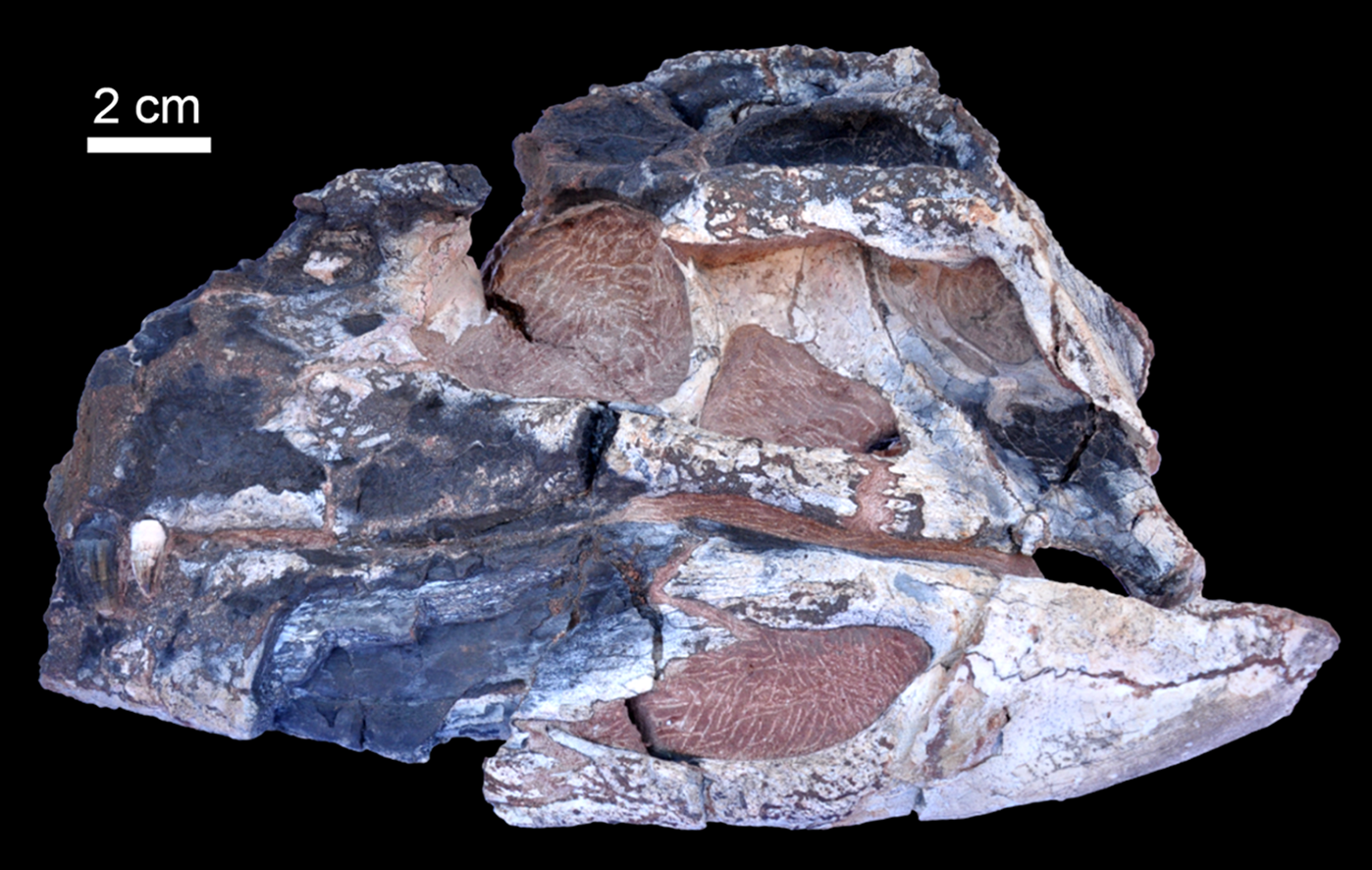
- Holotype skull

Scientific classification
- Kingdom: Animalia
- Phylum: Chordata
- Class: Reptilia
- Clade: Pseudosuchia
- Clade: Crocodylomorpha
- Clade: †Notosuchia
- Family: †Baurusuchidae
- Subfamily: †Pissarrachampsinae
- Genus: †Campinasuchus; Carvalho et al., 2011

Type species
- †Campinasuchus dinizi Carvalho et al., 2011

= Campinasuchus =

Campinasuchus Temporal range: Late Cretaceous, Turonian–Santonian

Extinct genus of reptiles

Campinasuchus is an extinct genus of baurusuchid mesoeucrocodylian from Minas Gerais State of Brazil.

== Discovery ==
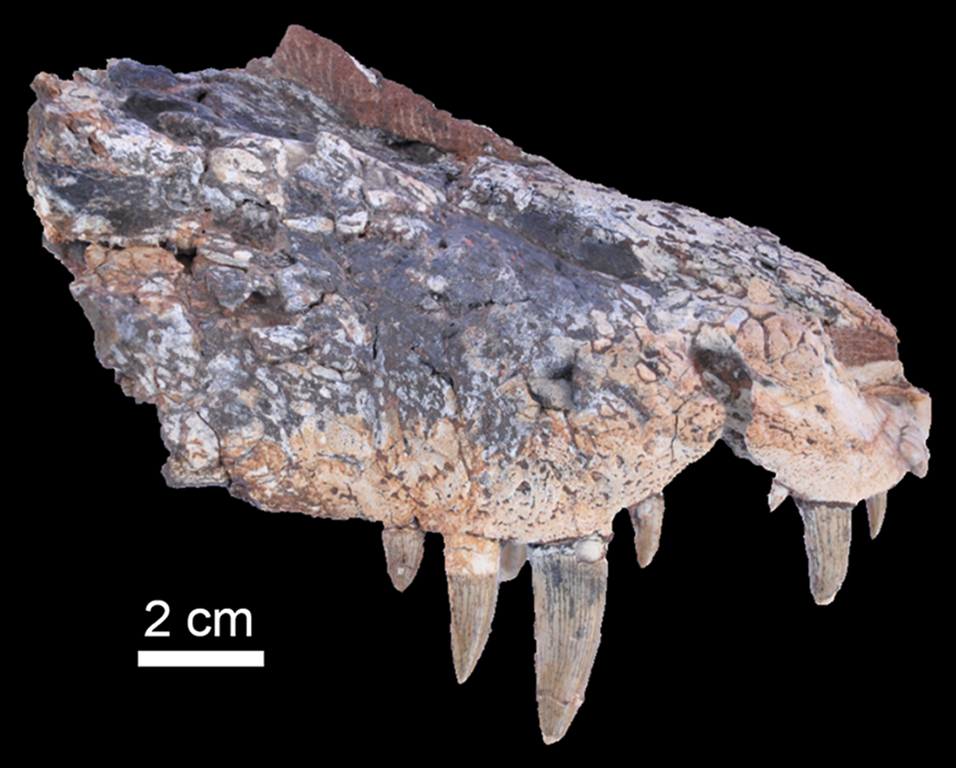
Assigned snout

Campinasuchus is known from four partial skulls from the Honorópolis District of the Adamantina Formation, Bauru Basin, dating to the Turonian or the Santonian stage of the late Cretaceous, about 93.5-83.5 million years ago. The specimens were collected at Três Antas Farm, Campina Verde County of the Minas Gerais State. The holotype CPP 1235 consists of a well-preserved posterior skull and partial rostrum, and the paratypes, CPP 1234, partial skull, CPP 1236, nearly complete rostrum and CPP 1237, partial skull (including mandible) and associated postcranial skeleton.

Campinasuchus was first named by Ismar De Souza Carvalho, Vicente De Paula Antunes Teixeira, Mara Lúcia Da Fonseca Ferraz, Luiz Carlos Borges Ribeiro, Agustín Guillermo Martinelli, Francisco Macedo Neto, Joseph J. W. Sertich, Gabriel Cardoso Cunha, Isabella Cardoso Cunha and Partícia Fonseca Ferraz in 2011 and the type species is Campinasuchus dinizi. The generic name is derived from Campina in reference to Campina Verde County in which Campinasuchus was found, and suchus, Latinized from the Greek souchos, an Egyptian crocodile god Sobek. The specific name honours the owners of the farm where the specimens were excavated: Izonel Queiroz Diniz Neto and the families Diniz and Martins Queiroz.

Campinasuchus is the fifth baurusuchid species from the Adamantina Formation to date.

== Description ==
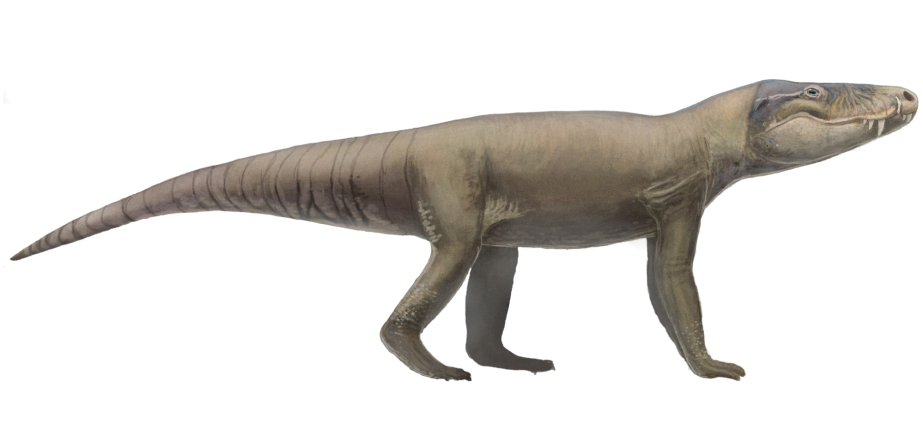
Life restoration

Campinasuchus, like other baurusuchids, was a fully terrestrial predator. It had a deep and laterally compressed skull with large, blade-like teeth. Compared to other baurusuchids, it has a very short, low snout. It is much narrower than the back of the skull. Its upper margin is also lower than the back of the skull, giving the head a slightly sloping profile (other baurusuchids have high snouts that are level with the rest of the skull). The third maxillary tooth of the upper jaw and the fourth dentary tooth of the lower jaw are greatly enlarged. A small pit on the premaxilla accommodates the first tooth of the mandible when the jaws are closed. This pit is positioned between the first and second premaxillary teeth. A deep notch forms the boundary between the premaxilla and maxilla, and provides an opening for the large fourth dentary tooth of the lower jaw. The supratemporal fenestrae, holes at the back of the skull, are relatively small. In other baurusuchids, the fenestrae are almost as large as the eye sockets.

== Classification ==
The cladogram following by Nicholl et al. 2021:

- Notosuchia
  - - Uruguaysuchidae
      - Araripesuchus tsangatsangana
      - - Anatosuchus
        - Araripesuchus wegeneri
      - - Araripesuchus buitreraensis
        - - Araripesuchus gomesii
          - - Araripesuchus patagonicus
            - Uruguaysuchus
    - - Mahajangasuchidae
        - Kaprosuchus
        - Mahajangasuchus
      - Peirosauridae
        - Stolokrosuchus
        - - - Bayomesasuchus
            - - Hamadasuchus
              - Antaeusuchus
          - - - Miadanasuchus
              - Barrosasuchus
            - - Gasparinisuchus
              - Rukwasuchus
              - - Uberabasuchus
                - - Lomasuchus
                  - Montealtosuchus
  - - Candidodon
    - Ziphosuchia
      - Libycosuchus
      - - Simosuchus
        - - Neuquensuchus
          - - Pakasuchus
            - Malawisuchus
          - Xenodontosuchia
            - Sphagesauria
              - Morrinhosuchus
              - - - Llanosuchus
                  - Notosuchus
                - - Labidiosuchus
                  - Mariliasuchus
                  - Sphagesauridae
                    - - Adamantinasuchus
                      - Yacarerani
                    - - Caipirasuchus
                      - - Sphagesaurus
                        - - Caryonosuchus
                          - Armadillosuchus
            - - Chimaerasuchus
              - - Comahuesuchus
                - Razanandrongobe
                - Sebecosuchia
                  - Baurusuchidae
                    - Cynodontosuchus
                    - - Pissarrachampsa
                      - Campinasuchus
                      - - Stratiosuchus
                        - Baurusuchus
                  - - - Bergisuchus
                      - Iberosuchus
                    - Sebecidae
                      - - Ayllusuchus
                        - Bretesuchus
                      - - Barinasuchus
                        - - Ogresuchus
                          - Sebecus
