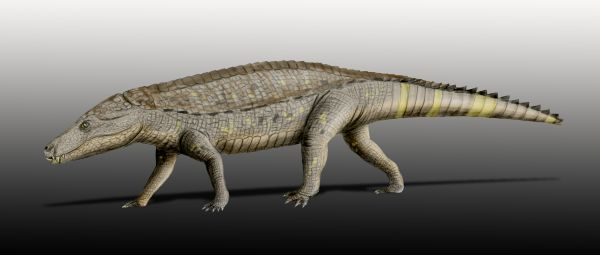

Scientific classification
- Kingdom: Animalia
- Phylum: Chordata
- Class: Reptilia
- Clade: Pseudosuchia
- Clade: Crocodylomorpha
- Clade: †Notosuchia
- Family: †Sphagesauridae
- Genus: †Armadillosuchus; Marinho & Carvalho 2009

Species
- †A. arrudai Marinho & Carvalho 2009 (type)

= Armadillosuchus =

Armadillosuchus Temporal range: Late Campanian-early Maastrichtian ~72–68 Ma

Extinct genus of reptiles

Armadillosuchus is an extinct genus of sphagesaurid crocodylomorph. It was described in February 2009 from the late Campanian to early Maastrichtian Adamantina Formation of the Bauru Basin in Brazil, dating to approximately 70 Ma. Armadillosuchus was among the larger and more robust sphagesaurids, with a total length of approximately 2 metres (6.6 ft).

Like other sphagesaurids, Armadillosuchus had heterodont teeth and was likely capable of chewing. Based on its dentition and size, it is believed that it was an omnivore, feeding on invertebrates, plants and possibly scavenging on occasion. Furthermore, its well developed forelimbs may have made the animal a capable burrower, which could have helped Armadillosuchus regulate its body temperature. The most recognizable feature of Armadillosuchus is its body armor, which makes it one of the best armored notosuchians. Preserved elements show the presence of a rigid shield of hexagonal osteoderms just behind the head, followed by a series of mobile bands similar to those of armadillos that give the animal its name. While this armor is prominent in the fossil specimen, later research suggests that it may not have been visible in life and was instead deeply embedded into the animal's skin.

Armadillosuchus was established with a single named species, Armadillosuchus arrudai, making the genus originally monotypic. However, the discovery of a fragmentary individual in the Adamantina Formation opens the possibility that other species existed as well.

In a 2026 taxonomic review, Pedro Akira Kitayama and Reinaldo José Bertini proposed that Armadillosuchus arrudai was a junior synonym of Sphagesaurus huenei, together with Caryonosuchus pricei. The authors explicitly regarded this interpretation as provisional.

== History and naming ==
The first fossil remains of Armadillosuchus were discovered in rocks of the Adamantina Formation in General Salgado County, Brazil. Initially these rock layers were thought to be Turonian to Santonian in age, but more recent research suggests that they were much younger, dating to the Campanian to Maastrichtian. Specimen UFRJ DG 303-R, chosen as the holotype of the taxon, is a well preserved partial skeleton retaining the entire skull, the neck and cervical osteoderms, the front of the torso and a nearly complete left forelimb. Alongside it Thiago S. Marinho and Ismar S. Carvalho also describe a second, less complete specimen, which they designate as the paratype of Armadillosuchus. This specimen consists of a partial upper and lower jaw. Both specimens have been discovered in close proximity to one another and although much less complete, the paratype could be assigned to Armadillosuchus thanks to the teeth preserved by the two individuals. Although additional material was later found, it was much more poorly preserved than the holotype, with the 165 total skeletal elements including a lot of bone fragments. Part of the reason for this was that the fossil was partially exposed, causing the elements to partially erode them. While showing clear affinities with Armadillosuchus, there are also differences between this specimen and A. arrudai. Due to this the specimen is only identified as Armadillosuchus sp. and may represent a distinct species in the genus.

The genus name Armadillosuchus is derived from the Spanish armadillo, chosen due to the superficially similar osteoderm-shields of the two animals. The second part of the name is derived from the Ancient Greek "souchus" for crocodile, as is common in fossil crocodylomorphs. The species name on the other hand was chosen in honor of João Tadeu Arruda for his numerous contributions to the paleontology of the area.

=== 2026 taxonomic reassessment ===
Kitayama and Bertini (2026) re-examined the holotype UFRJ DG 303-R and paratype MPMA 64 0001-04 alongside material referred to Sphagesaurus huenei. They considered the characters used to distinguish A. arrudai insufficiently diagnostic, interpreting differences in cranial proportions and ornamentation as compatible with intraspecific variation and preservational deformation. They also reported that several features of the occipital region previously used in the diagnoses of Armadillosuchus and Sphagesaurus were shared by UFRJ DG 303-R and RCL-100, and questioned the consistency of some dental characters used to separate them.

The authors proposed referring UFRJ DG 303-R and MPMA 64 0001-04 to S. huenei, treating A. arrudai as its junior synonym. Their conclusions were explicitly provisional and could be reassessed using additional well-preserved specimens or quantitative morphological analyses.

== Description ==
The fossil specimen of Armadillosuchus is not complete, but thanks to the protective armour plating much of it has been reasonably well preserved. The skull is robust and slightly flattened, though maintaining the overall oreinirostral form typical for Notosuchians. While the snout is relatively longer and wider compared to Adamantinasuchus and Sphagesaurus, it is still rather short. Like in other sphagesaurids, the teeth show a wide variety of morphologies, different from the uniform homodont dentition of most crocodyliforms. These tooth morphologies include curved caniniforms, protruding front teeth that resembled incisors and conical molariform teeth with shearing edges filling the remainder of its mouth. Each premaxilla only contained two to three teeth, with the second pair being the aforementioned caniniforms that greatly exceed the first pair in size. Further back on the upper jaw the teeth are distinctly asymmetrical, with the outer edge being relatively smooth while the side facing inward is marked by a ridge covered in a series of tubercles. The lower jaw is notably narrower than the upper and the first pair of dentary teeth is directed forward like in Adamantinasuchus and Mariliasuchus. The fourth tooth in the lower jaw shows flattened sides and a keel directed towards the front, while further back in the jaw the dentition more closely matches that of the posterior upper jaw. However, a key difference here is that the tubercle-lined keel faces outwards rather than inwards.

The ribs of Armadillosuchus show signs of having undergone pachyostosis, meaning that they are thickened. The limbs were elongated like in other Notosuchians, but still relatively short compared with other sphagesaurids, with the humerus being much more robust than in Caipirasuchus. In Armadillosuchus, the widest point of the humerus measures about half of the bones maximum length. The shoulder blade was also stout with its height and width being roughly equal to one another.

Among sphagesaurids, Armadillosuchus is classed among the large-bodied forms with a skull length around 300 mm (12 in), nearly twice that of the smaller members of the family (such as Yacarerani and Adamantinasuchus). Armadillosuchus may have reached a total body length of up to 2 m (6 ft 7 in).

=== Osteoderms ===
Like other crocodylomorphs, Armadillosuchus had prominent body armor formed by small bony plates known as osteoderms. Directly behind the animal's skull, protecting the neck, the osteoderms are fused together to create a rigid shield of hexagonal plates, known as the cervical shield or nuchal shield, which is ornamented by parallel horizontal ridges. Although this element itself was rigid, the way it connected to the body meant it could be articulated independently from the head, rather than locking it in place. This is then loosely linked to seven bands of osteoderms that form the mobile thoracic armor, which superficially resembles that of modern armadillos. The central portion of this armor is formed by a series of overlapping osteoderms, which are rectangular in shape and ornamented with circular pits similar to those seen in other neosuchians. The first five bands of Armadillosuchus' thoracic armor are composed of four parallel osteoderms, while the sixth and seventh show only two. Due to the resemblance of those final two bands to the posterior osteoderms of modern crocodiles, Marinho and Carvalho suggest that the armor behind the preserved section may have lacked the mobile bands and been much simpler, consisting of only a single double-row. However the armor of the back of the body is only known from isolated material and thus difficult to reconstruct. Based on fragmentary remains described by Cunha and colleagues, the osteoderms of the tail ranged from being rectangular in shape to being subtriangular, but generally wider than they were long like those of the torso. A variety of accessory osteoderms are also known.

While Armadillosuchus, alongside Simosuchus, is among the most heavily armored Notosuchian, a 2022 study suggests that the osteoderms may not have been visible in life in the same way they appear in modern crocodilians. The paper specifically covers Sharpey's fibers, a collagen structure anchoring the osteoderms to the underlying layer of the skin, known as the stratum compactum. While in modern crocodilians these fibers help keep the bottom of the osteoderms connected to the skin, the study shows that in many Notosuchians including Armadillosuchus, Sharpey's fibers also run perpendicular to their outer surface. A similar condition can be seen in today's leatherback and softshell turtles, leading the authors to suggest that the osteoderms of Armadillosuchus were deeply embedded into the skin of the animal and covered in a leathery dermis. This may have had the advantage of increased flexibility.

== Phylogeny ==
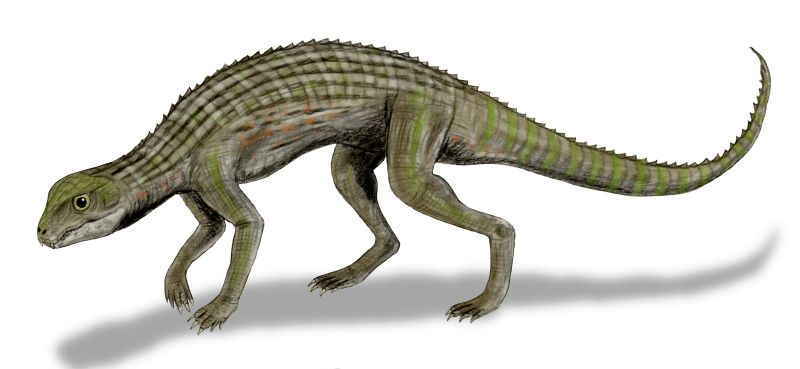
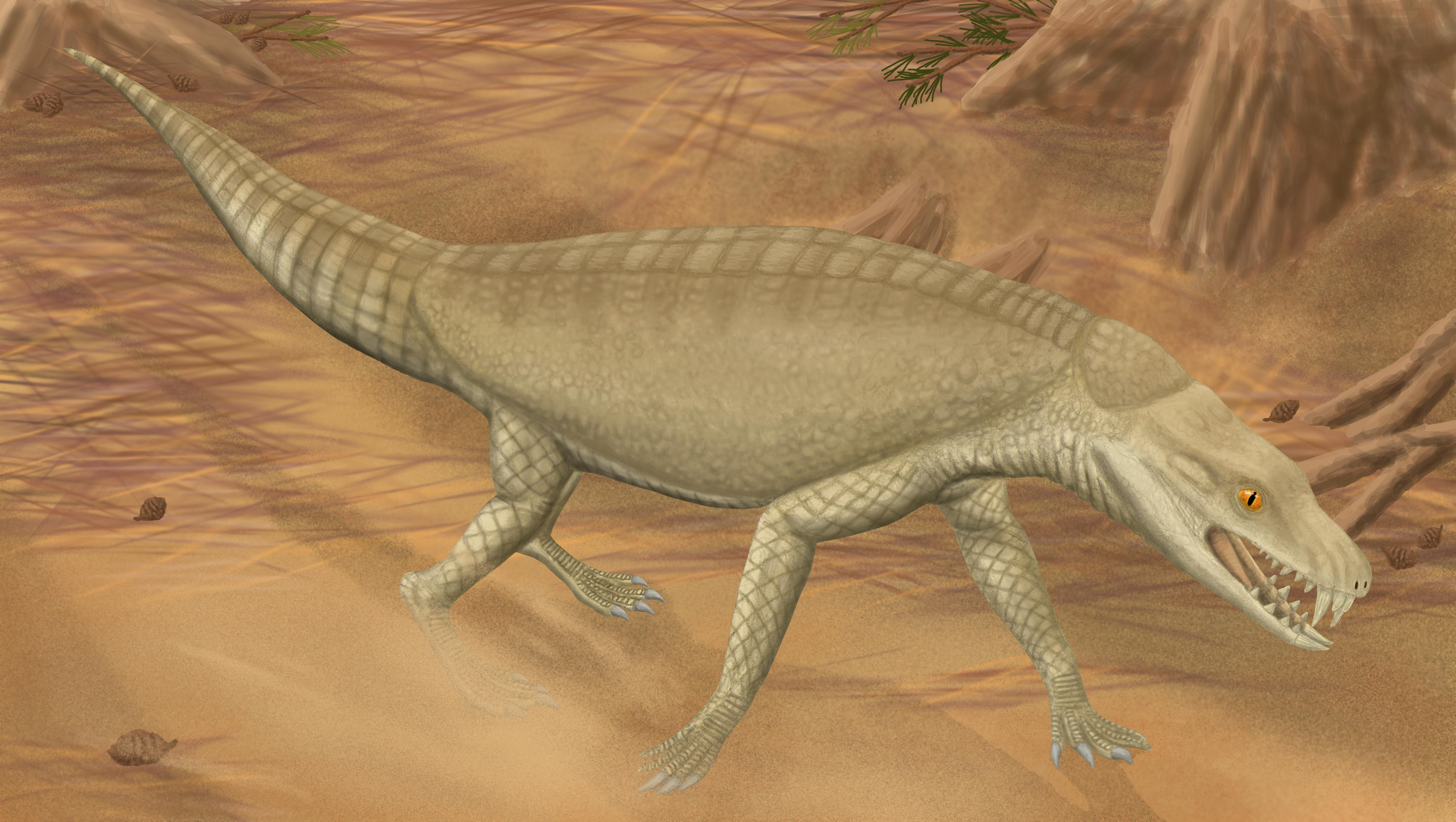
While basal sphagesaurids were relatively small and gracile, derived members of the family like Armadillosuchus (bottom) reached greater sizes and possessed more extensive armor.

Phylogenetic analyses published before the 2026 reassessment recovered Armadillosuchus as a derived member of the Sphagesauridae, a family of Notosuchians endemic to South America known for their heterodont dentition. Research has found that sphagesaurids can generally be divided into short-snouted, small-bodied and generally more gracile taxa such as Adamantinasuchus and much larger, more robust and better armored animals, which includes Armadillosuchus. Within this group, these studies recovered Armadillosuchus as closely related to Caryonosuchus. The phylogenetic tree below shows the result of the phylogenetic analysis conducted by Cunha et al. (2020) following the discovery of the remains of an unnamed species of Armadillosuchus. Their analysis suggests a clear link between Armadillosuchus arrudai and the as of yet unnamed second species, but find the two to be placed in a polytomy alongside Caryonosuchus.

- - Candidodon
  - - Libycosuchus
    - - Simosuchus
      - - - Pakasuchus
          - Malawisuchus
        - - advanced notosuchians
            - Morrinhosuchus
            - - - Llanosuchus
                - Notosuchus
              - - - Labidiosuchus
                  - Mariliasuchus
                - Sphagesauridae
                  - - Adamantinasuchus
                    - Yacarerani
                  - - Caipirasuchus
                    - large‑bodied sphagesaurids
                      - Sphagesaurus huenei
                      - - Armadillosuchus sp.
                        - Caryonosuchus
                        - Armadillosuchus arrudai
          - - Chimaerasuchus
            - - Comahuesuchus
              - - Baurusuchidae
                - Sebecidae

== Paleobiology ==
=== Metabolism ===
Research conducted to determine the resting metabolic rate as well as the estimated dimensions of the red blood cells indicate that Armadillosuchus was an ectothermic animal like modern crocodilians. However, despite this Armadillosuchus and other terrestrial Notosuchians may have regulated their internal temperature in a manner more similar to modern monitor lizards. It is possible that they would have basked in sunlight to raise their body temperature and stuck to sunlit areas while foraging, but retreated into burrows should they be under threat of overheating. During basking, the osteoderms may have helped to absorb and retain heat over extended periods of time, helping the animal to maintain high levels of activity even without direct sunlight.

=== Diet and foraging ===
The teeth of Armadillosuchus give several clues to its ecology. Both their morphology and the way they are arranged give the animal powerful, scissor-like jaws. Wear facets seen on the teeth suggests that the animal performed back and forward movement with its jaws in a chewing motion similar to Sphagesaurus. Earlier interpretations emphasized a difference from Sphagesaurus in tooth occlusion, with the fifth dentary tooth located just before the third maxillary tooth, and suggested that this might relate to the animal foraging beneath ground. Additional evidence for such habits can be found in the robust anatomy of the shoulder girdle, the long claws on its forelimbs and the robust neck. The forelimbs in particular may have been used either to create burrows or to dig while foraging, with the former matching with the inferred thermoregulatory behavior of Notosuchians. One hypothesis on the dietary preferences of this animal proposes that Armadillosuchus was an omnivore, feeding on a variety of animals and plants including molluscs, arthropods, roots and pines. Although no remains of molluscs were found in the direct vicinity of the fossils, the fact that the Adamantina Formation featured rivers and lakes and preserves the remains of bivalves in other localities still lends support to this hypothesis. It is also possible that Armadillosuchus scavenged at least occasionally and that the tooth wear seen in the known material was caused by the animal feeding on dried up carcasses. Besides the tubercles on the keels of the molariform teeth and the ability to move its jaws back and forth in a grinding motion, Armadillosuchus may have also employed the help of gastroliths to help grind food.

A 2019 study more closely examined the teeth of Armadillosuchus using a method known as orientation patch count rotated (OPCR), originally designed to analyse the complexity of the tooth occlusion in rodents. This method has previously shown a clear relation between the morphology of premolar and molar teeth and the diet of various animal groups, including reptiles. Both the value of the most complex tooth and the overall average of Armadillosuchus were found to form an intermediate between a carnivorous diet (represented by Boverisuchus and Notosuchus) and durophages (represented by Allognathosuchus and Brachychampsa). While this could be indicative of both insectivorous or omnivorous diet, the latter is more likely given the large size of Armadillosuchus.

=== Defense ===
In addition to being favorable for digging, the stout and robust body of Armadillosuchus, combined with the underlying armor plating formed by the osteoderms, may have also been an effective deterrent against predators. The extensive armor of Armadillosuchus has been likened not just to armadillos but also to the osteoderms of ankylosaurids. This unifies the large bodied sphagesaurids like Armadillosuchus and Caryonosuchus and sets them apart from the more gracile early sphagesaurids like Caipirasuchus.
