= Gasparinisuchus =

Gasparinisuchus Temporal range: Late Cretaceous, 85.8–77.5 Ma

Scientific classification
- Domain: Eukaryota
- Kingdom: Animalia
- Phylum: Chordata
- Class: Reptilia
- Clade: Archosauria
- Clade: Pseudosuchia
- Clade: Crocodylomorpha
- Clade: Crocodyliformes
- Clade: †Notosuchia
- Clade: †Sebecosuchia
- Clade: †Sebecia
- Family: †Peirosauridae
- Genus: †Gasparinisuchus; Martinelli et al., 2012

Type species
- †Gasparinisuchus peirosauroides Martinelli et al., 2012

Extinct genus of reptiles

Gasparinisuchus is an extinct genus of peirosaurid notosuchian known from the Late Cretaceous (Santonian to early Campanian stage) of Neuquén and Mendoza Provinces, western central Argentina. It contains a single species, Gasparinisuchus peirosauroides.

== Discovery ==
Gasparinisuchus is known only from two individuals. The holotype MOZ 1750 PV represented by partial skull and lower jaws with teeth and various associated postcranial skeleton including vertebrae and dermal plates which are currently missing. It was originally described by Gasparini (1982) and Gasparini et al. (1991) and referred to Peirosaurus torminni. MOZ 1750 PV was found in the Loma de la Lata locality of the Neuquén Province, Patagonia. It was originally reported as collected from sediments of the Rio Colorado Subgroup, Neuquén Group. Later, Hugo and Leanza (2001) noted that this specimen was actually collected from the underlying Portezuelo Formation of the Rio Neuquén Subgroup, Neuquén Group. More recent stratigraphic work on this area identified that horizon as belonging to the younger, Coniacian-age, Plottier Formation of the Rio Neuquén Subgroup. This horizon is currently considered to pertain to the Santonian-age Bajo de la Carpa Formation of the Rio Colorado Subgroup.

The referred specimen, PV-CRIDC-12, represented by right premaxilla and maxilla, isolated teeth, and part of the postcranial skeleton. It was originally tentatively referred to P. torminni by Praderio et al. (2009). It was found in the Área de Cañadón Amarrillo locality, of the Mendoza Province, Patagonia. It was collected from the slightly younger early Campanian-age Anacleto Formation, also part of the Neuquén Group.

== Description ==
The type species G. peirosauroides was described and named in 2012 on the basis of MOZ 1750 PV, which was originally referred to Peirosaurus torminni. PV-CRIDC-12 was also excluded from P. torminni and referred to Gasparinisuchus on the basis of similarities to the holotype. The maxilla of PV-CRIDC-12 shares a number of derived features with Gasparinisucus, indicating a tall, broad snout, maxillary teeth implanted in discrete alveoli, a convex alveolar maxillary edge at the level of the third tooth and similar position and relative size of the maxillary teeth. Comprarisons with the holotype of P. torminni are uninformative because the premaxilla of PV-CRIDC-12 is poorly preserved. Gasparinisuchus differs from other peirosaurids in having a broad snout and in lacking an antorbital fenestra. Although overlapping materials between the Gasparinisuchus and P. torminni limited to the premaxilla and the dentition, Gasparinisuchus can be differentiate from Peirosaurus on the basis of its broad, rounded rostrum, anteroposteriorly short premaxilla, reduced perinareal fossa, and short premaxillary interdental spaces. Peirosaurus is known from the late Maastrichtian (latest Cretaceous) of Brazil, and the presence of MOZ 1750 PV in Argentina was originally taken as evidence for a link between Brazilian and Argentinian Late Cretaceous faunas. The removal of MOZ 1750 PV from the genus Peirosaurus suggests that the older Argentinian and younger Brazilian faunas were mostly distinct. The phylogenetic position of MOZ 1750 PV was previously tested in several recent analyses under the taxon name P. torminni. The following cladogram simplified after a comprehensive analysis of notosuchians presented by Alan H. Turner and Joseph J. W. Sertich in 2010.

- Notosuchia
  - Anatosuchus
  - - - Mahajangasuchidae
        - Kaprosuchus
        - Mahajangasuchus
      - Peirosauridae
        - - Gasparinisuchus
          - Lomasuchus
        - - Hamadasuchus
          - - Montealtosuchus
            - Uberabasuchus
    - - "Araripesuchus" wegeneri
      - - "Araripesuchus" tsangatsangana
        - - - Araripesuchus buitreraensis
            - - Araripesuchus patagonicus
              - Araripesuchus gomesii
          - - Uruguaysuchus
            - Ziphosuchia
              - - Libycosuchus
                - Simosuchus
              - - Malawisuchus
                - - Notosuchidae
                    - Notosuchus
                    - Mariliasuchus
                  - - - Chimaerasuchus
                      - - Sphagesaurus huenei
                        - Sphagesaurus montealtensis
                    - - - Comahuesuchus
                        - - Yacarerani
                          - - Adamantinasuchus
                            - Armadillosuchus
                      - Sebecosuchia
                        - Baurusuchus
                        - Sebecia

== Etymology ==
Gasparinisuchus was first described and named by Agustín G. Martinelli, Joseph J.W. Sertich, Alberto C. Garrido and Ángel M. Praderio in 2012 and the type species is Gasparinisuchus peirosauroides. The generic name honors the vertebrate paleontologist Zulma Brandoni de Gasparini for her work on South American crocodyliforms, and suchus from the Greek Souchos, which refers to the Egyptian crocodile-headed god Sobek. The specific name is derived from Peirosaurus, the type genus of the Peirosauridae to which specimens of Gasparinisuchus were initially assigned, and from Greek ides meaning shaped. It refers to the importance of the holotype specimen as the basis for the designation of the Family Peirosauridae by Gasparini (1982).
