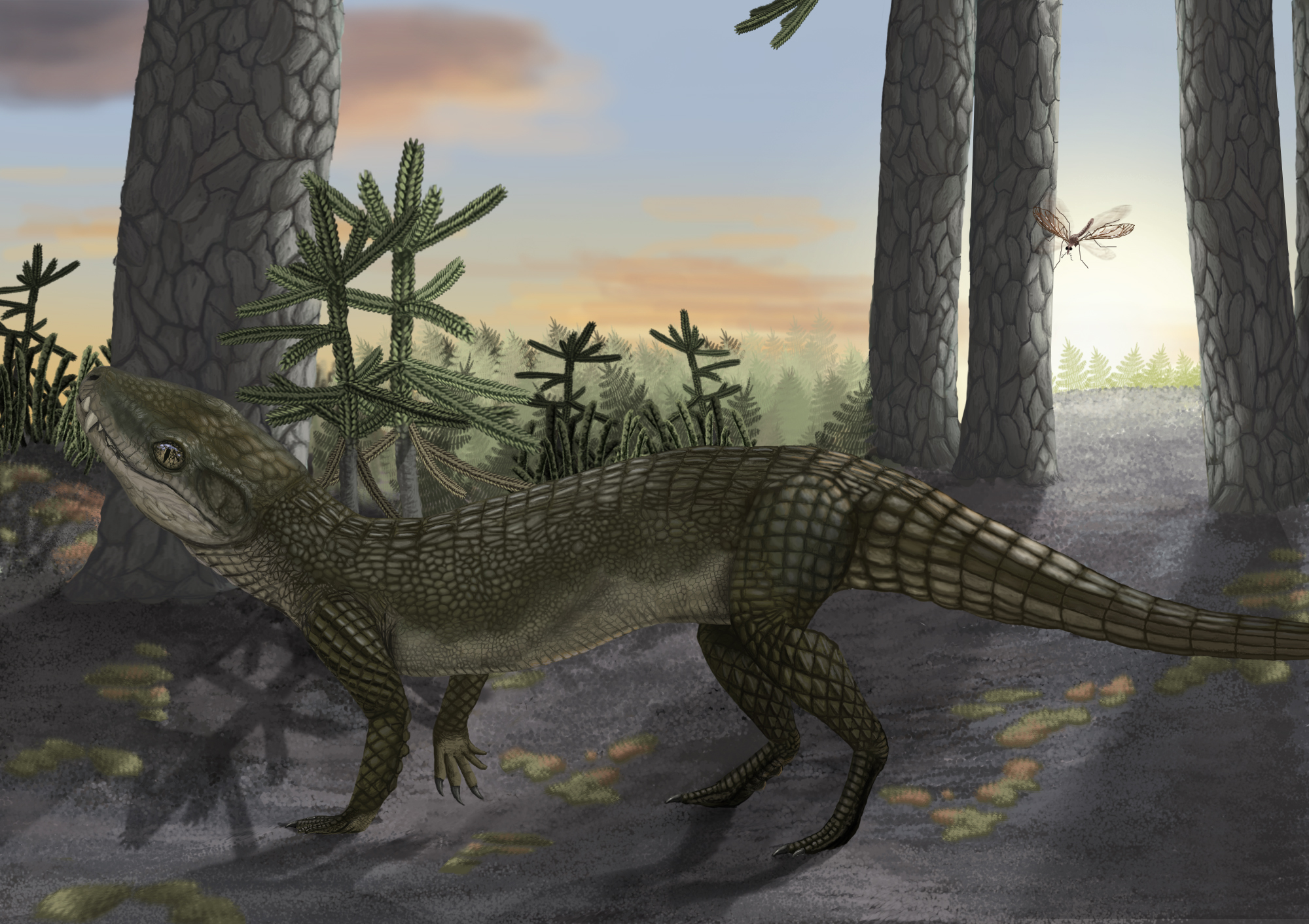
- Life restoration of Pakasuchus.

Scientific classification
- Kingdom: Animalia
- Phylum: Chordata
- Class: Reptilia
- Clade: Pseudosuchia
- Clade: Crocodylomorpha
- Clade: †Notosuchia
- Clade: †Ziphosuchia
- Genus: †Pakasuchus; O’Connor et al., 2010

Species
- P. kapilimai O'Connor et al., 2010 (type)

= Pakasuchus =

Pakasuchus Temporal range: Cenomanian–Campanian

Extinct genus of reptiles

Pakasuchus is a genus of notosuchian crocodyliform distinguished by its unusual mammal-like appearance, including mammal-like teeth that would have given the animal the ability to chew. It also had long, slender legs and a doglike nose. Fossils have been found in the Galula Formation of Rukwa Rift Basin of southwestern Tanzania, and were described in 2010 in the journal Nature. Pakasuchus is originally considered to lived approximately 105 million years ago, in the mid-Cretaceous, but later age of site is reconsidered to the late Cretaceous, Cenomanian to Campanian instead. The type species is P. kapilimai. Pakasuchus means "cat crocodile" (paka meaning "cat" in Kiswahili) in reference to its catlike skull.

== Description ==
Dentition of Pakasuchus. Gray areas are restored parts of the skull missing in the holotype.

Pakasuchus was around 50 centimetres (20 in) long. Like all notosuchians, it was an active terrestrial animal. It probably hunted small prey such as insects. It had a short, broad skull somewhat similar in shape to a cat. Unlike living crocodilians, Pakasuchus had distinctive heterodont teeth that varied in shape throughout its jaws. There are large, sharp teeth near the front of the jaws, and broad molar-like teeth at the back of the mouth. While multicuspid teeth are seen in many other notosuchians such as Simosuchus and Yacarerani, they are most complex in Pakasuchus. The molar-like teeth show a level of complexity that matches that of mammals, being able to occlude, or fit with one another, and provide sharp shearing edges for slicing food.

Pakasuchus also differed from modern crocodilians, and many other crocodyliforms, in the reduction of osteoderms covering the body. Small, reduced osteoderms overlie the dorsal vertebrae, but fewer in number and are not as large as those of other notosuchians. However, caudal osteoderms still covered the tail. The loss of osteoderms on the body and retention of them on the tail is unique among crocodyliforms.

== Discovery ==
A complete skeleton of Pakasuchus was found in 2008 in southwestern Tanzania by an international research team funded by the National Science Foundation and the National Geographic Society as part of the Rukwa Rift Basin Project. Remains from six other individuals were later uncovered. The specific name honors Saidi Kapilima, one of the leaders of the Rukwa Rift Basin Project and who helped in the excavation of the specimens.

The most complete specimen includes a nearly complete skull. Because the jaws were closed in this specimen, some of the teeth were obscured. The describers of the specimens used X-ray computed tomography scanning, or CT scanning, to image the teeth. This provided a detailed view of the animal's dentition that could not normally be observed in the specimen.

== Phylogeny ==
Below is a cladogram modified from O’Connor et al., 2010:

- Notosuchia
  - Uruguaysuchus
  - - - Libycosuchus
      - - Malawisuchus
        - Candidodon
        - - Mariliasuchus
          - - Pakasuchus
            - Adamantinasuchus
    - - Simosuchus
      - - Notosuchus
        - - Chimaerasuchus
          - - Sphagesaurus
            - - Comahuesuchus
              - Baurusuchus

== Paleobiology ==
Pakasuchus was probably very mammal-like in behavior as well as appearance. The molariform teeth are well suited to shearing food like modern mammalian carnivores (for example, all many species of bears, canids, big cats, hyenas, mustelids, procyonids, mongooses and pinnipeds). In fact, the teeth are so similar to those of mammals that it has led paleontologist Greg Buckley to state "If only isolated teeth had been discovered, without the skull, it is very likely that some of the molariform teeth would have been mistaken for a mammal's."

The relative lack of osteoderms on the body may have been an adaptation for an active terrestrial lifestyle, as it would have lightened the animal. However, the retention of osteoderms on the tail is hard to explain, as they would have been quite heavy. The long legs and slender build would also have made Pakasuchus more agile.

Pakasuchus was probably an herbivore; its dentition was at least as complex as those of modern herbivorous lizards.

Notosuchians were widespread across Gondwana throughout the Cretaceous. Pakasuchus, as well as many other notosuchians, would have filled ecological niches in these areas that were otherwise occupied by mammals in the northern continents. Mammals were relatively uncommon in Gondwana at the time, making it possible for notosuchians to occupy a similar niche.

The Rukwa Rift Basin is known for a rich vertebrate fauna that existed during the Cretaceous. During the Early Cretaceous, the basin was part of a large river system with braided channels and low-lying vegetated floodplains. Several dinosaurs are known from the basin that would have lived alongside Pakasuchus, including large sauropods and theropods. Aquatic crocodyliforms inhabited the rivers along with turtles and fishes.
