= Caryonosuchus =

Caryonosuchus Temporal range: Late Cretaceous, ~72.1–68 Ma

Scientific classification
- Domain: Eukaryota
- Kingdom: Animalia
- Phylum: Chordata
- Class: Reptilia
- Clade: Archosauria
- Clade: Pseudosuchia
- Clade: Crocodylomorpha
- Clade: Crocodyliformes
- Clade: †Notosuchia
- Family: †Sphagesauridae
- Genus: †Caryonosuchus; Kellner et al., 2011

Type species
- †Caryonosuchus pricei Kellner et al., 2011

Extinct genus of reptiles

Caryonosuchus is an extinct genus of sphagesaurid notosuchian known from the Late Cretaceous of São Paulo State, southeastern Brazil.

== Discovery ==
Caryonosuchus is known only from the holotype specimen DGM 1411-R, a nearly complete anterior portion of the skull and lower jaw which housed at the Earth Science Museum of the Departamento Nacional da Produção Mineral. A cast is housed at the Departamento de Geologia, Universidade Federal do Rio de Janeiro. It was found near Presidente Prudente City of southwest São Paulo State. It was collected from the Adamantina Formation of the Bauru Basin, which dates to the Campanian and Maastrichtian stages of the Late Cretaceous. DGM 1411-R was briefly mentioned before the description of Caryonosuchus. For example, Kellner & Campos (1999) tentatively assigned it to Sphagesaurus sp., however newly described cranial sphagesaurid remains may suggest that the type species of the family, Sphagesaurus huenei, is a nomen dubium. Thus, DGM 1411-R is regarded as a new genus and species.

== Description ==
Caryonosuchus is characterized by a unique combination of characters, including three autapomorphies (unique characteristics) such as a rostrum with horn-like tubercles on the maxilla and on the premaxilla. Caryonosuchus also has autapomorphic rough ornamentation with grooves and bony ridges on its rostrum. DGM 1411-R was found to be an advanced sphagesaurid in a phylogenetic analysis published by de Andrade et al. (2011). The following cladogram shows the position of Caryonosuchus among other sphagesaurids sensu this study.

- - Notosuchidae
    - Mariliasuchus
    - Notosuchus
  - Sphagesauridae
    - - Adamantinasuchus
      - Yacarerani
    - - Armadillosuchus
      - - Sphagesaurus huenei
        - - Sphagesaurus montealtensis
          - Caryonosuchus

== Etymology ==
Caryonosuchus was first named by Alexander W. A. Kellner, Diogenes A. Campos, Douglas Riff and Marco Brandalise de Andrade in 2011 and the type species is Caryonosuchus pricei. The generic name is derived from Greek káryon meaning "kernel" or "protuberance" and souchos meaning "crocodile". The specific name honors Llewellyn Ivor Price, a palaeontologist who described and named the genus Sphagesaurus and described the holotype of Caryonosuchus in an unpublished manuscript.
