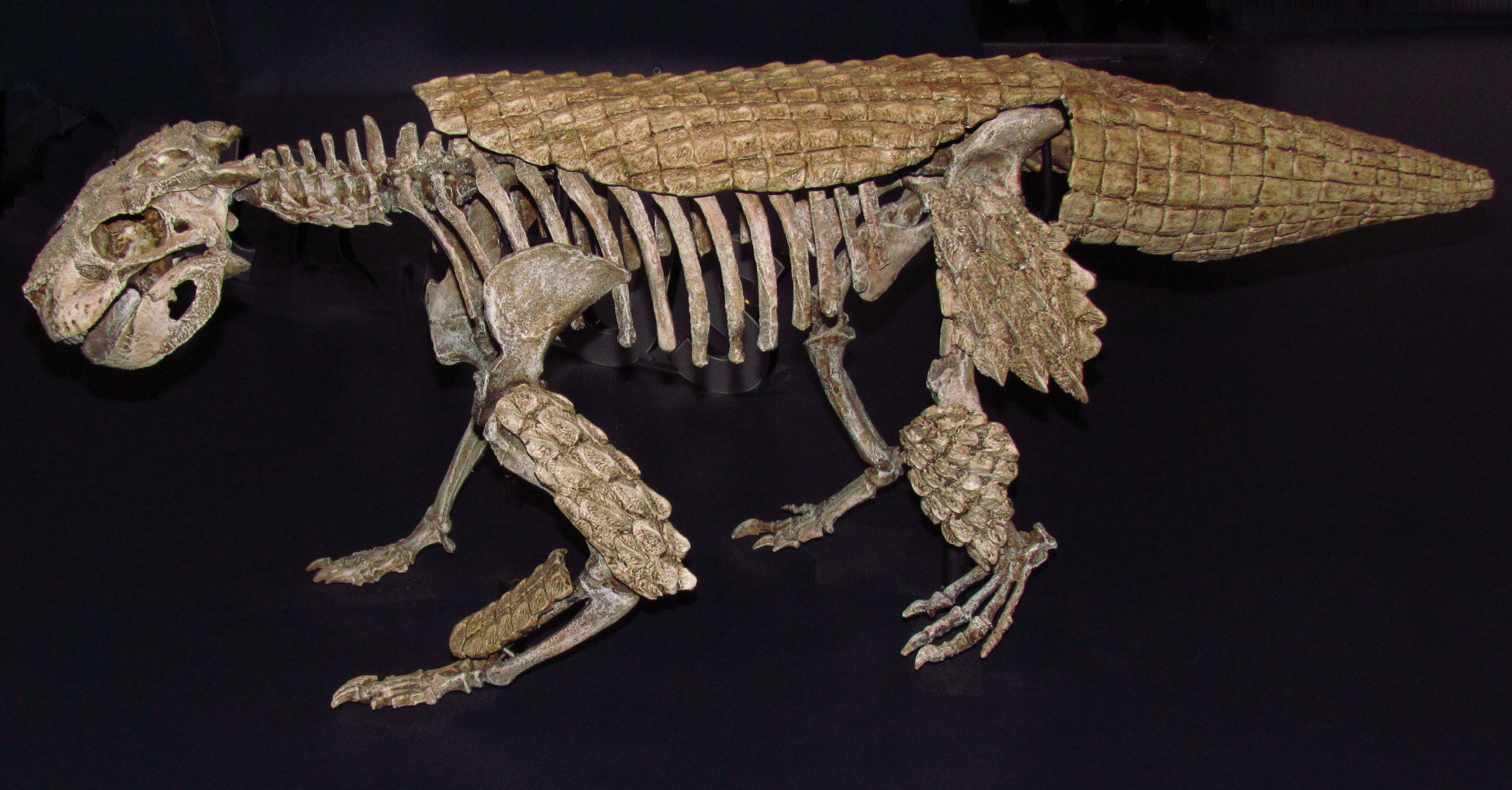
- Reconstructed skeleton in Royal Ontario Museum
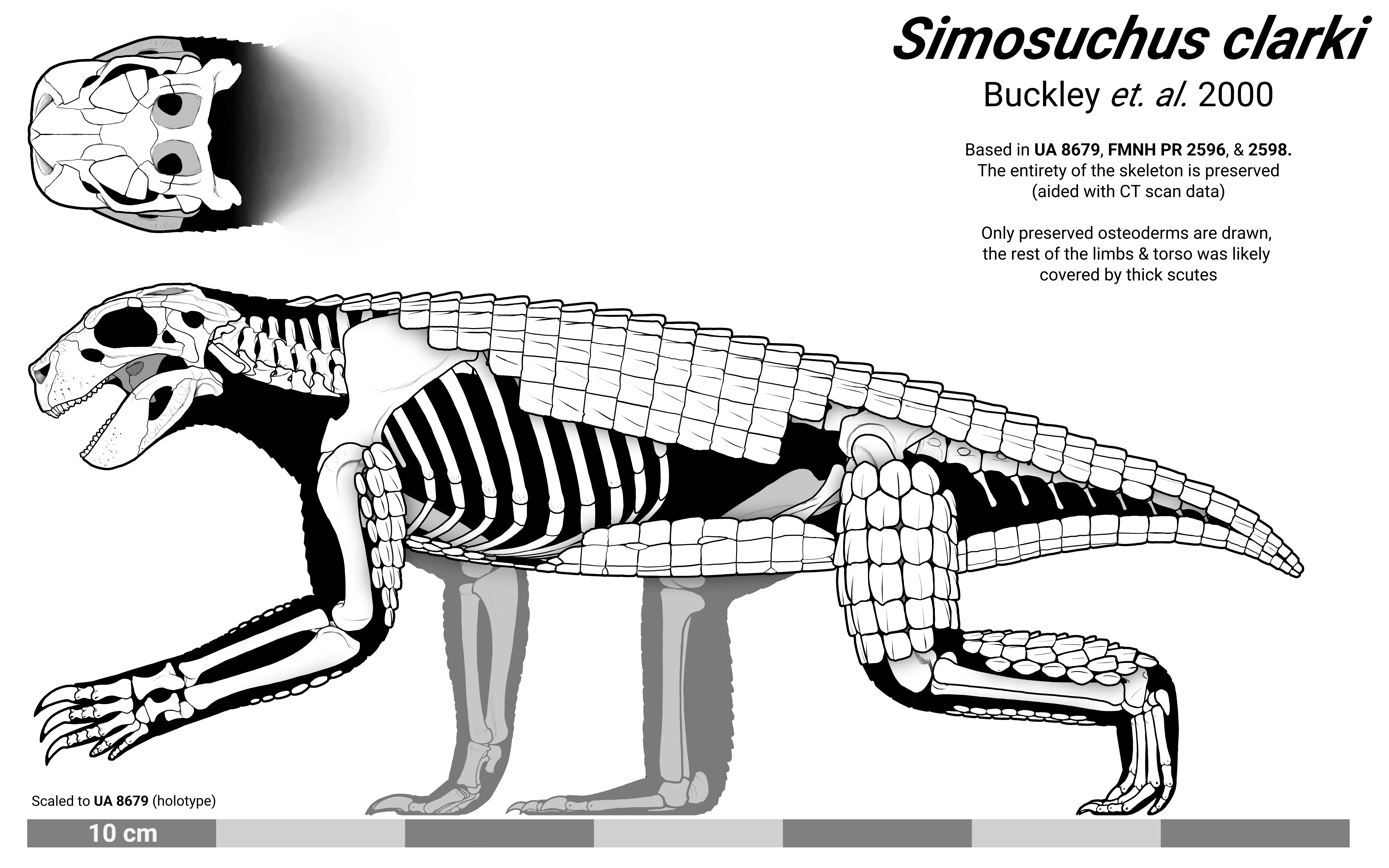
- Skeletal reconstruction

Scientific classification
- Kingdom: Animalia
- Phylum: Chordata
- Class: Reptilia
- Clade: Pseudosuchia
- Clade: Crocodylomorpha
- Clade: †Notosuchia
- Clade: †Ziphosuchia
- Genus: †Simosuchus; Buckley et al., 2000

Species
- †S. clarki Buckley et al., 2000 (type)

= Simosuchus =

Simosuchus Temporal range: Late Cretaceous, 70–66 Ma

Extinct genus of reptiles

Simosuchus is an extinct genus of notosuchian crocodyliforms from the Late Cretaceous of Madagascar. It is named for its unusually short skull. Fully grown individuals were about 0.75 metres (2.5 ft) in length. The type species is Simosuchus clarki, found from the Maevarano Formation in Mahajanga Province, although one isolated multicuspid tooth of this genus was discovered in Kallamedu Formation of India.

The teeth of S. clarki were shaped like maple leaves, which coupled with its short and deep snout suggests it was not a carnivore like most other crocodylomorphs. In fact, these features have led many palaeontologists to consider it a herbivore.

== History ==
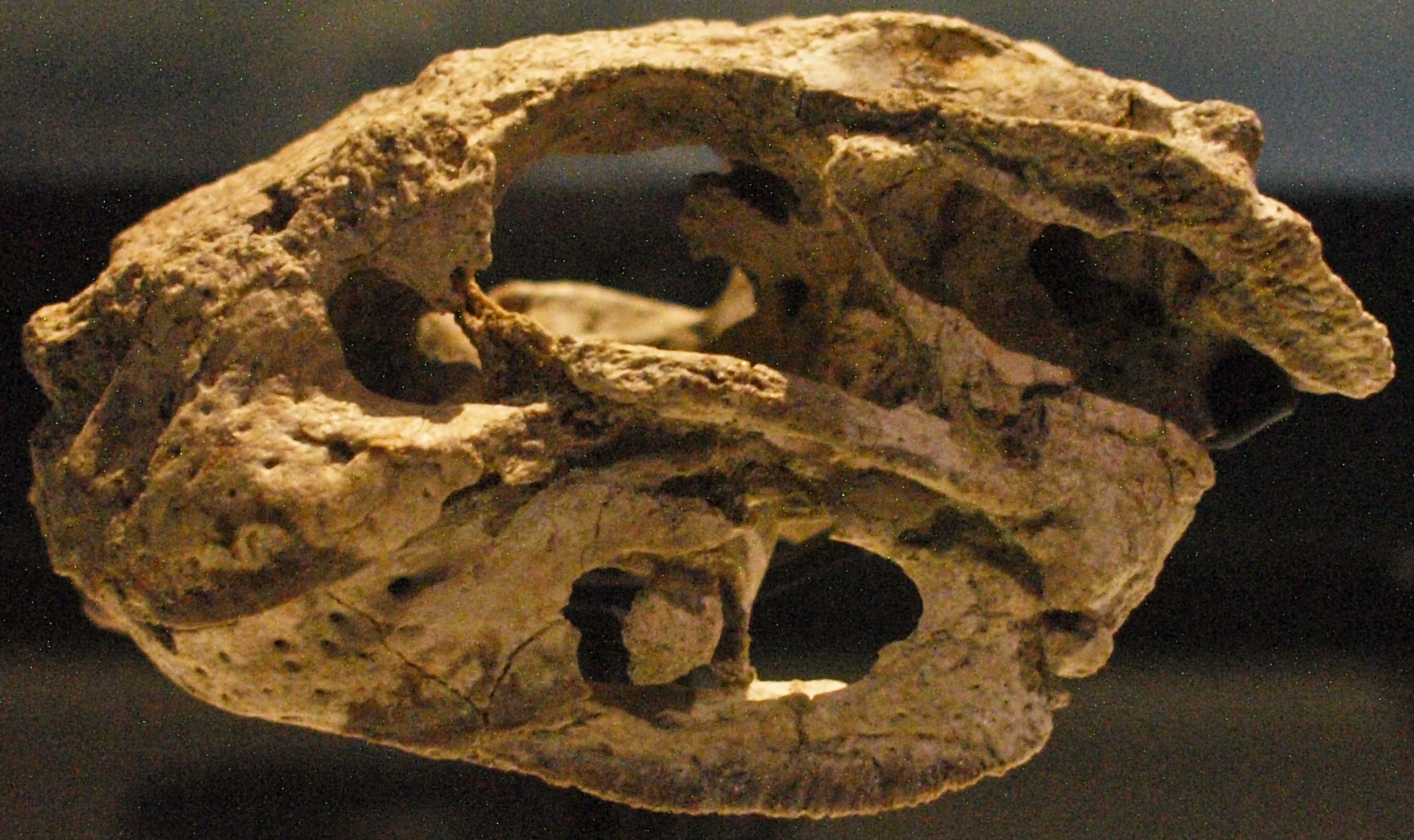
Skull FMNH PR 2597

The first specimen of Simosuchus clarki, which served as the basis for its initial description in 2000, included a complete skull and lower jaw, the front of the postcranial skeleton, and parts of the posterior postcranial skeleton. Five more specimens were later described, representing the majority of the skeleton. Many isolated teeth have also been found in the Mahajanga Basin. Most remains of Simosuchus were found as part of the Mahajanga Basin Project, directed by the Université d'Antananarivo and Stony Brook University. Material was usually found in clays that were part of flow deposits in the Anembalemba Member of the Maevarano Formation.

== Description ==
Size comparison to a human

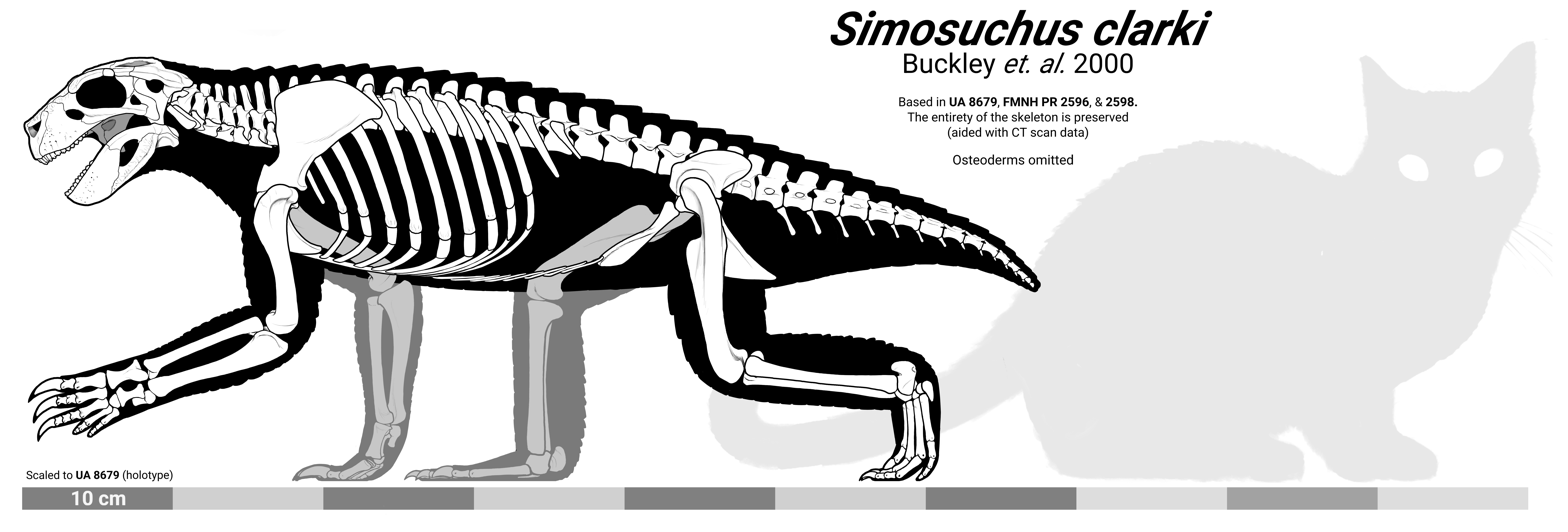
Skeletal anatomy, osteoderms omitted

Simosuchus was small, about 0.75 metres (2.5 ft) long based on the skeletons of mature individuals. In contrast to most other crocodyliforms, which have long, low skulls, Simosuchus has a distinctively short snout. The snout resembles that of a pug, giving the genus its name, which means "pug-nosed crocodile" in Greek. The shape of skulls differs considerably between specimens, with variation in ornamentation and bony projections. These differences may be indications of sexual dimorphism. The front (preorbita) portion of the skull is angled downwards. Simosuchus likely held its head so that the preorbital area was angled about 45° from horizontal. The teeth line the front of the jaws and are shaped like maple leaves. At the back of the skull, the occipital condyle (which articulates with the neck vertebrae) is downturned. 45 autapomorphies, or features unique to Simosuchus, can be found in the skull alone.

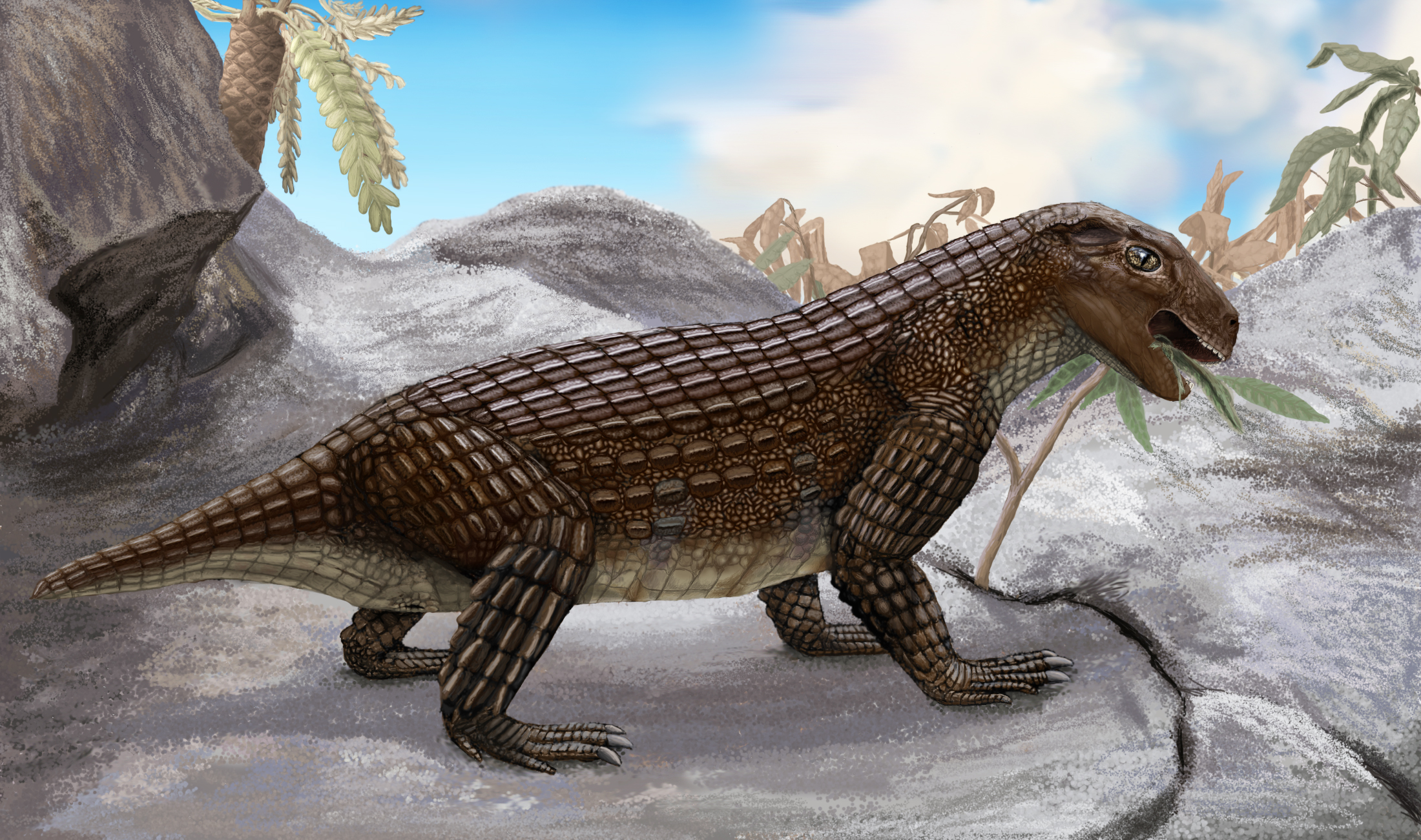
Life restoration

In most respects, the postcranial skeleton of Simosuchus resembles that of other terrestrial crocodyliforms. There are several differences, however, that have been used to distinguish it from related forms. The scapula is broad and tripartite (three-pronged). On its surface, there is a laterally directed prominence. The deltopectoral crest, a crest on the upper end of the humerus, is small. The glenohumeral condyle of the humerus, which connects to the pectoral girdle in the shoulder joint, has a distinctive rounded ellipsoid shape. The limbs are robust. The radius and ulna of the forearm fit tightly together. The front feet are small with large claws, and the back feet are also reduced in size. There is a small crest along the anterior edge of the femur. On the pelvis, the anterior process of the ischium is spur-like.

Most of the spinal column of Simosuchus is known. There are eight cervical vertebrae in the neck, at least fifteen dorsal vertebrae in the back, two sacral vertebrae at the hip, and no more than twenty caudal vertebrae in the tail. The number of vertebrae in the tail is less than that of most crocodyliforms, giving Simosuchus a very short tail.

Like other crocodyliforms, Simosuchus was covered in bony plates called osteoderms. These form shields over the back, underside, and tail. Unusually among crocodyliforms, Simosuchus also has osteoderms covering much of the limbs. Osteoderms covering the back, tail, and limbs are light and porous, while the osteoderms covering the belly are plate-like and have an inner structure resembling spongy diploë. Simosuchus has a tetraserial paravertebral shield over its back, meaning that there are four rows of tightly locking paramedial osteoderms (osteoderms to either side of the midline of the back). To either side of the shield, there are four rows of accessory parasagittal osteoderms. These accessory osteoderms tightly interlock with one another.

== Classification ==
Cladograms of Notosuchia

Turner and Calvo, 2005

- Notosuchia
  - - - Notosuchus
      - - Anatosuchus
        - Comahuesuchus
    - - Malawisuchus
      - - Uruguaysuchus
        - Simosuchus
  - Sebecosuchia

Pol et al., 2012

- Notosuchia
  - - Uruguaysuchidae
    - Peirosauridae
  - - Candidodon
    - Ziphosuchia
      - Libycosuchus
      - - Simosuchus
        - - Malawisuchus
          - - - Notosuchus
              - - Comahuesuchus
                - Mariliasuchus
            - - - Chimaerasuchus
                - Sphagesaurus
              - Sebecosuchia

Simosuchus was first considered to be a basal member of the clade Notosuchia, and was often considered to be closely related to Uruguaysuchus from the Late Cretaceous of Uruguay and Malawisuchus from the Early Cretaceous of Malawi. Later phylogenetic studies have placed it closer to the genus Libycosuchus and in a more derived position than some other notosuchians such as Uruguaysuchus. In its initial description by Buckley et al. (2000), Simosuchus was placed in the family Notosuchidae. Its sister taxon was Uruguaysuchus, and the two were allied with Malawisuchus. These taxa were placed in Notosuchidae along with Libycosuchus and Notosuchus. Most of the following phylogenetic analyses resulted in a similar placement of Simosuchus and other genera within Notosuchia. Turner and Calvo (2005) also found a clade including Simosuchus, Uruguaysuchus, and Malawisuchus in their study.

The phylogenetic analysis of Carvalho et al. (2004), based on different character values than previous studies, produced a very different relationship among Simosuchus and other notosuchians. Simosuchus, along with Uruguaysuchus and Comahuesuchus, were placed outside Notosuchia. Simosuchus was found to be the sister taxon of the Chinese genus Chimaerasuchus in the family Chimaerasuchidae. Like Simosuchus, Chimaerasuchus has a short snout and was probably herbivorous. Both genera were placed outside Notosuchia in the larger clade Gondwanasuchia. Uruguaysuchus, previously considered to be a basal notosuchian and a close relative of Simosuchus, was placed in its own family, Uruguaysuchidae, also outside Notosuchia. Malawisuchus was found to be a member of Peirosauroidea, specifically a member of the family Itasuchidae.

The following cladogram simplified after a comprehensive analysis of notosuchians which focused on Simosuchus clarki presented by Alan H. Turner and Joseph J. W. Sertich in 2010.

- Notosuchia
  - Anatosuchus
  - - - Mahajangasuchidae
        - Kaprosuchus
        - Mahajangasuchus
      - Peirosauridae
        - - Gasparinisuchus*
          - Lomasuchus
        - - Hamadasuchus
          - - Montealtosuchus
            - Uberabasuchus
    - - "Araripesuchus" wegeneri
      - - "Araripesuchus" tsangatsangana
        - - - Araripesuchus buitreraensis
            - - Araripesuchus patagonicus
              - Araripesuchus gomesii
          - - Uruguaysuchus
            - Ziphosuchia
              - - Libycosuchus
                - Simosuchus
              - - Malawisuchus
                - - Notosuchidae
                    - Notosuchus
                    - Mariliasuchus
                  - - - Chimaerasuchus
                      - - Sphagesaurus huenei
                        - Sphagesaurus montealtensis
                    - - - Comahuesuchus
                        - - Yacarerani
                          - - Adamantinasuchus
                            - Armadillosuchus
                      - Sebecosuchia
                        - Baurusuchus
                        - Sebecia

*Note: Based on a specimen that was reassigned from Peirosaurus.

== Paleobiology ==
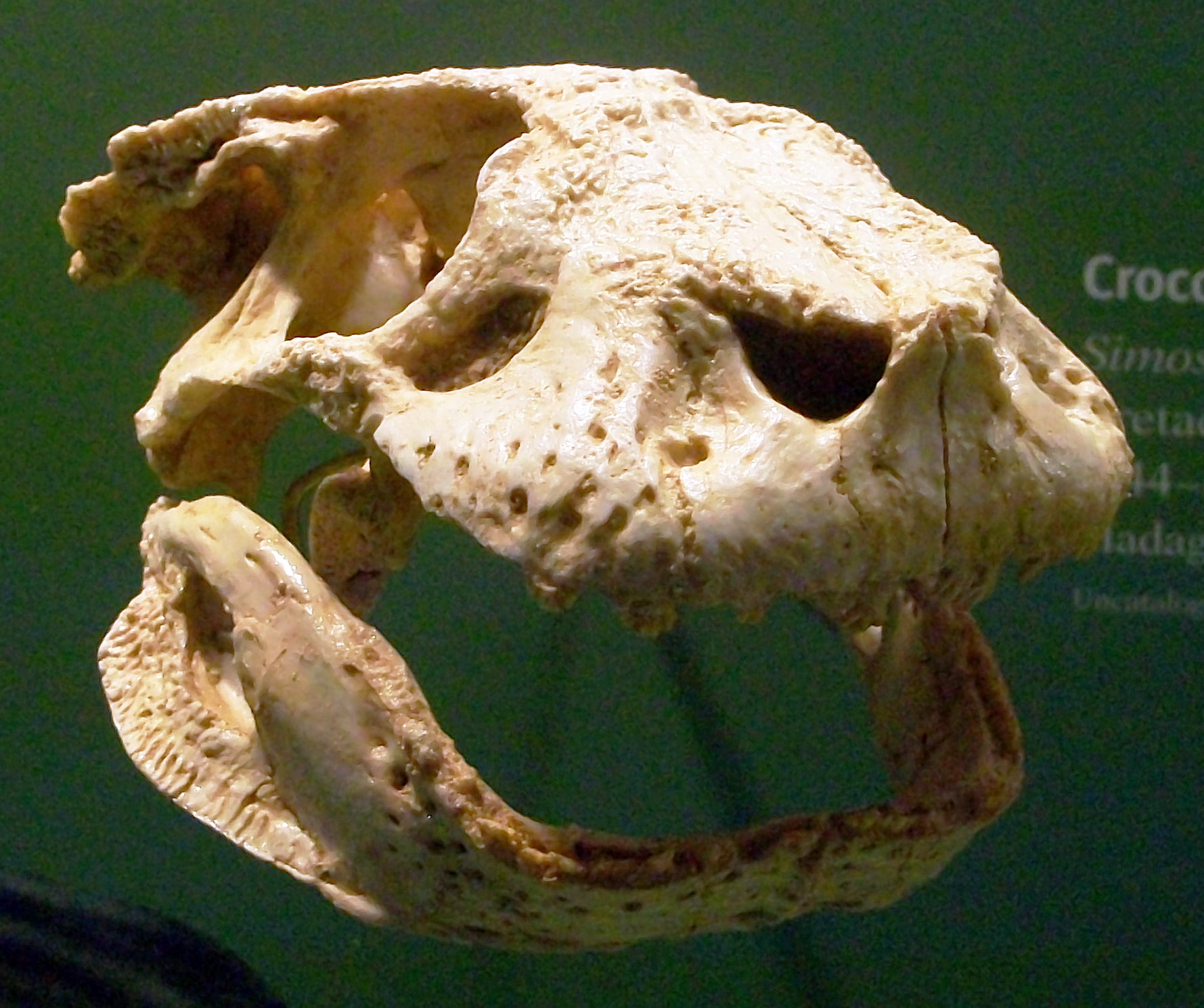
Reconstructed skull in the Field Museum of Natural History

Simosuchus was probably a herbivore, with its complex dentition resembling that of herbivorous iguanids. Like other notosuchians, it was fully terrestrial, and the short tail would have had little use in swimming.

The osteoderm shield was inflexible, restricting lateral movement in Simosuchus as a possible adaptation to an entirely terrestrial lifestyle. Robust legs are also consistent with terrestrial locomotion. The deltopectoral crest on the humerus and the anterior crest on the femur served as attachment points for strong limb muscles. The hindlimbs of Simosuchus were semierect, unlike the fully erect posture of most other notosuchians.

=== Possible fossorial lifestyle ===
A fossorial, or burrowing, lifestyle for Simosuchus has been suggested in its initial description based on the robust limbs and short snout, which appears shovel-like, and the underslung lower jaw that would prevent friction when the animal opens its jaws during burrowing. There are also areas on the skull that may have attached to strong neck muscles that would have been well suited for burrowing.

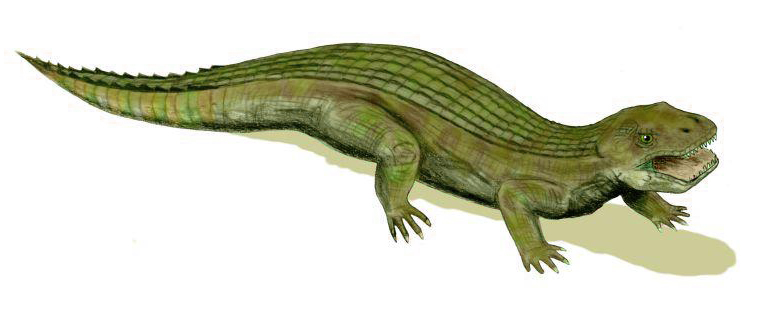
Outdated restoration done before discovery of whole-body skeleton

In 2010, Kley and colleagues have argued against this hypothesis on the basis of its morphology which doesn't show an adaptation as head-first burrowers, with its relatively large, wide head being disadvantageous and contrasting modern head-first burrowers. They also pointed out that the snout is not shovel-like, since it doesn't have a "dorsoventrally narrowed cutting edge" on it, but rather has a "relatively expansive anterior surface" which is almost completely flat. The lower jaw also wouldn't be "shielded" to a significant extent in response to the reaction force during burrowing; even the shielded portion, the premaxillary teeth which is crucial for feeding, would not have been able to endure the "extreme loading regimes associated with head-first burrowing." The upper jaw was also suggested to be not adapted for keeping its mouth shut when faced by reaction forces associated with burrowing. Its relatively large orbits were also inconsistent with a burrowing lifestyle, since large eyes have a risk of being damaged in head-first burrowing.

In the same year, Sertich and Groenke noted that while the appendicular skeleton including the scapula and the forelimb doesn't show specific morphological adaptation for digging, it doesn't exclude the idea that Simosuchus was adept at burrowing, since many extant crocodylians that are able to burrow also don't show any of the specific morphological specializations. Georgi and Krause, also in the same year, agreed that the burrowing hypothesis couldn't be confidently excluded, and claimed that the hypothesis needs more extensive comparative and functional analyses. They also suggested that its relatively short neck would have been a potential advantage for moving through a dense medium like a tunnel, and that it may have likely used its head on occasions to aid scratch-digging with its limbs.

=== Paleobiogeography ===
It is unknown how Simosuchus arrived in Madagascar. A similar crocodyliform, Araripesuchus tsangatsangana, is also known from the Maevarano Formation, but its relation to Simosuchus is unclear. It has been classified as both a notosuchian and a basal neosuchian in various phylogenetic analyses. Nearly all notosuchians are known from Gondwana, the southern supercontinent that existed throughout much of the Mesozoic and encompassed South America, Africa, India, Australia, and Antarctica. Libycosuchus, regarded as one of the closest relatives of Simosuchus, lived in Egypt. Unresolved relationships among notosuchians along with an incomplete fossil record have made it difficult to determine the biogeographic origins of Simosuchus.

=== Predation ===
Adults of Simosuchus clarki may have been eaten by adults of the snake Madtsoia madagascariensis, though such large prey would have caused injuries for the snake.

== See also ==
- Malawisuchus
- Smallest organisms
