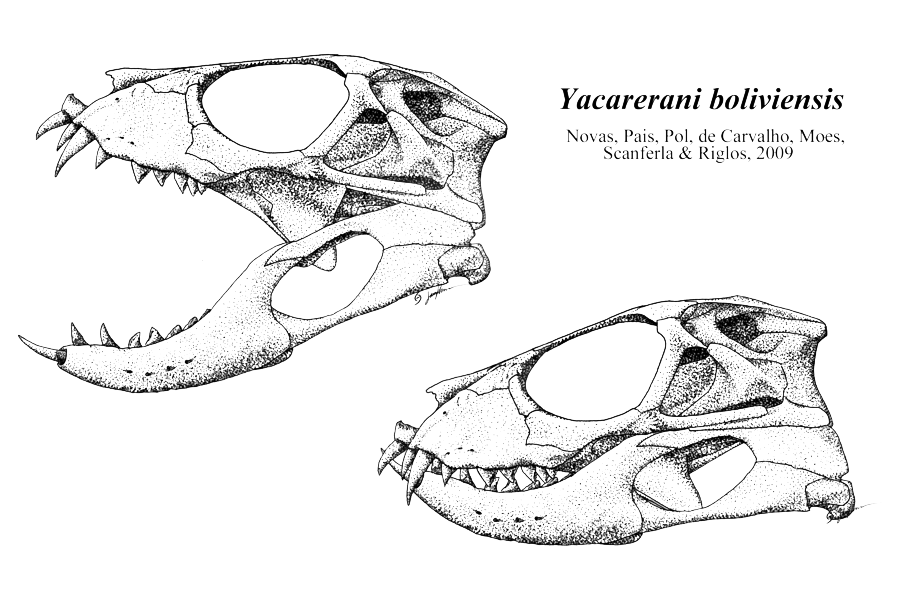
- Skull restoration
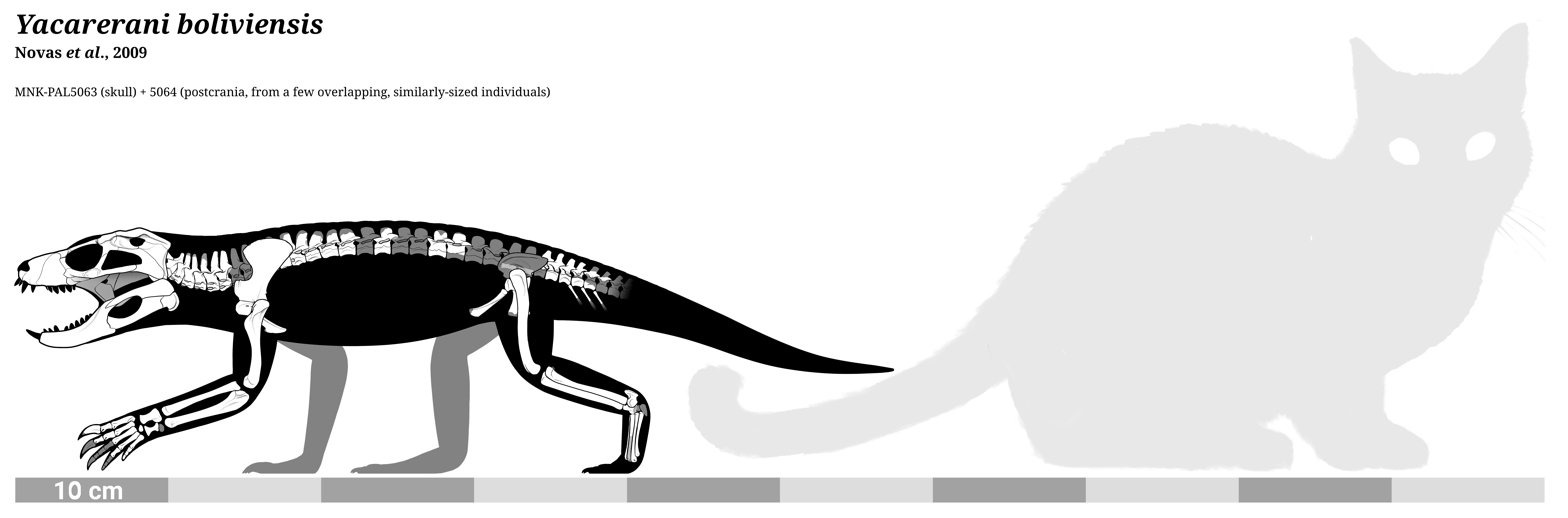
- Skeletal reconstruction

Scientific classification
- Kingdom: Animalia
- Phylum: Chordata
- Class: Reptilia
- Clade: Pseudosuchia
- Clade: Crocodylomorpha
- Clade: †Notosuchia
- Family: †Sphagesauridae
- Genus: †Yacarerani; Novas et al., 2009

Species
- †Y. boliviensis Novas et al., 2009

= Yacarerani =

Yacarerani Temporal range: Turonian-Santonian ~94.3–84.9 Ma

Extinct genus of reptiles

Yacarerani (meaning "first Yacare" in Guaraní) is an extinct genus of Late Cretaceous notosuchian crocodylomorph. Fossils have been found in 2002 in the Cajones Formation in Amboró National Park of central Bolivia and are Turonian-Santonian in age. The genus was described in 2009 in the Journal of Vertebrate Paleontology. The material represents two individuals and was found in association with eggs that are thought to have been part of a nest. Yacarerani was a small crocodylomorph at around 80 centimetres (31 in) in length. It may have lived in small groups, creating burrows to lay eggs in.

== Description and taxonomy ==
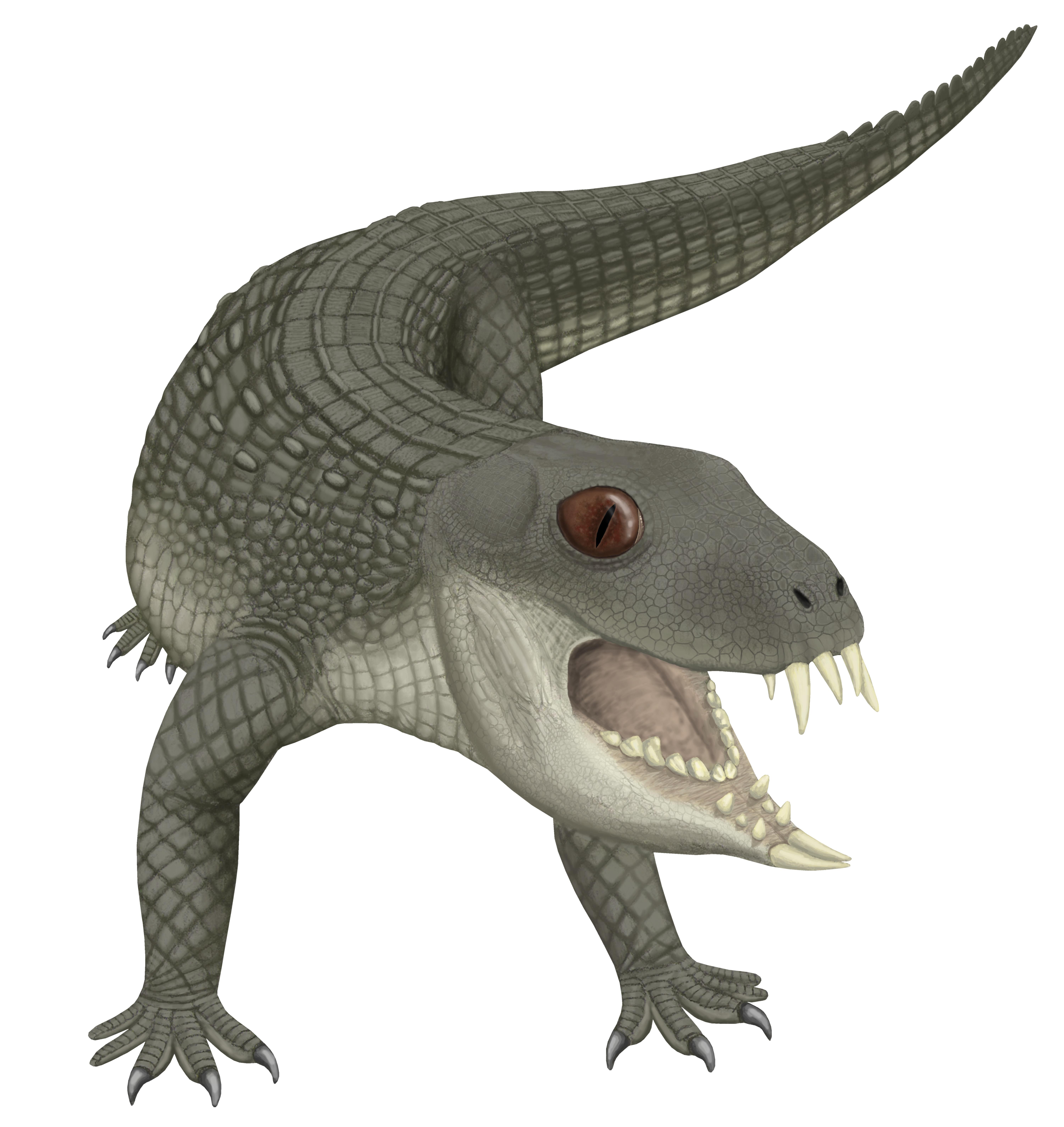
Restoration

The dentition of Yacarerani, like many other notosuchians, is heterodont, with different tooth morphologies in different parts of the jaws. Two teeth in the lower jaw project forward from the tip, resembling the incisors of a rabbit. Other teeth, situated posteriorly, are cusped and adapted for grinding or chopping food such as tubers or small arthropods. In the lower jaw, the dentary tooth rows merge posterior to the anterior dentary teeth. The same is true for the upper tooth rows, which merge on the palate.

Yacarerani presents similar teeth morphology to Adamantinasuchus navae, a crocodylomorph from Adamantina Formation, Bauru Group, Brazil.

Below is a cladogram from Novas et al. (2009) showing the phylogenetic position of Yacarerani:

- Notosuchia
  - Uruguaysuchus
  - Araripesuchus
  - - Simosuchus
    - Libycosuchus
    - - Malawisuchus
      - Candidodon
    - - Notosuchus
      - - Comahuesuchus
        - Mariliasuchus
        - - Yacarerani
          - Adamantinasuchus
      - - - Chimaerasuchus
          - Sphagesaurus
        - - Baurusuchus
          - Sebecidae
