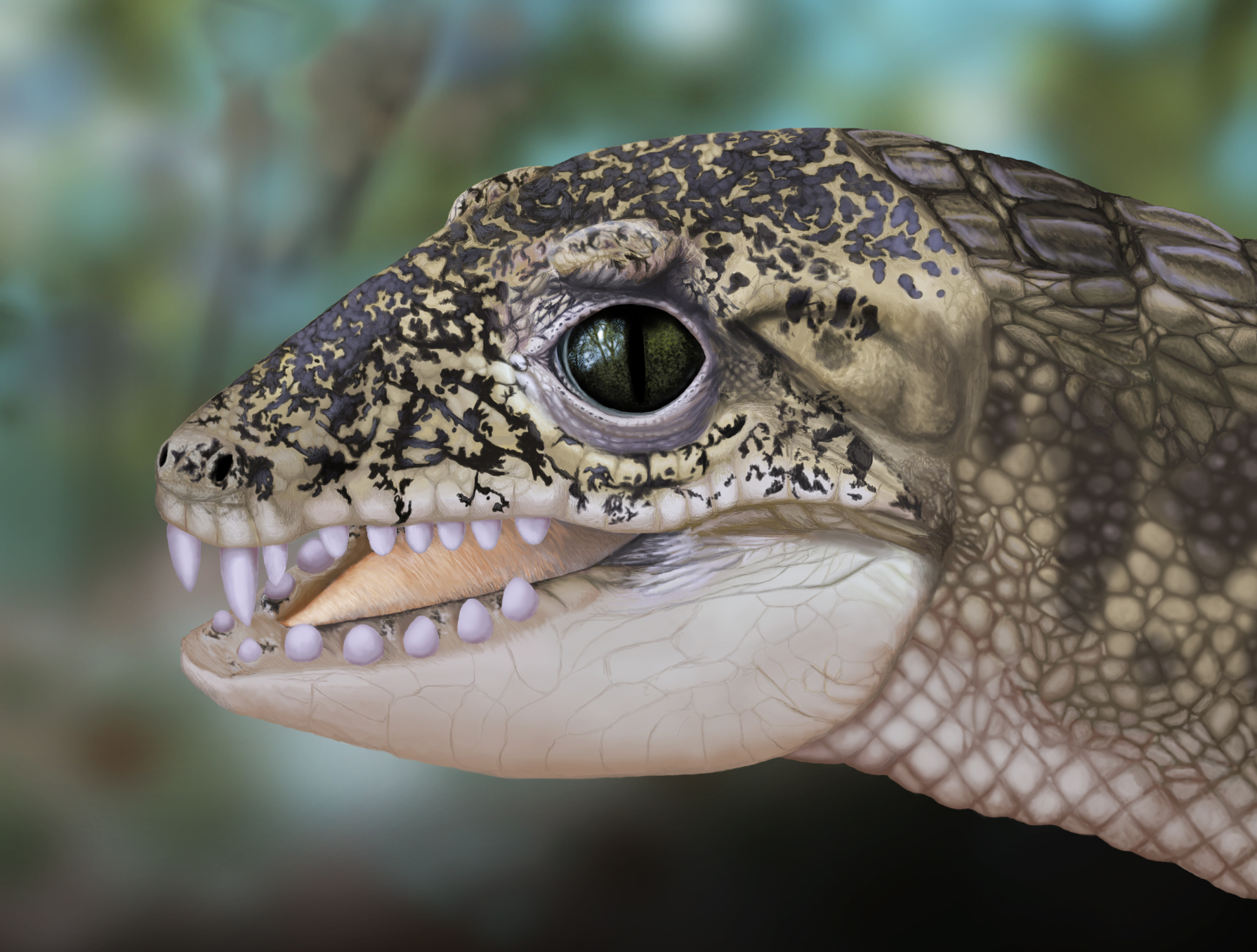
- Life restoration

Scientific classification
- Kingdom: Animalia
- Phylum: Chordata
- Class: Reptilia
- Clade: Archosauria
- Clade: Pseudosuchia
- Clade: Crocodylomorpha
- Clade: †Notosuchia
- Family: †Sphagesauridae
- Genus: †Morrinhosuchus; Iori and Carvalho, 2009
- Species: †M. luziae

Binomial name
- †Morrinhosuchus luziae Iori and Carvalho, 2009

= Morrinhosuchus =

Morrinhosuchus Temporal range: Late Cretaceous, 72.1–68 Ma

Extinct genus of reptiles

Morrinhosuchus is an extinct genus of notosuchian crocodyliform from the Late Cretaceous Adamantina Formation of Brazil. It is known from a mandible and a portion of the front of the skull collected from the municipality of Monte Alto in São Paulo state. Morrinhosuchus refers to Morrinho de Santa Luzia, a hill nearby the collection site of the holotype, while luziae refers to the chapel of Santa Luzia, which is located on top of the hill.

== Description ==
The skull and jaws are posteriorly broad but narrow significantly toward the front. The teeth at the back of the jaw are bulbous in shape and circular in cross-section (this shape is only found in one other notosuchian, Mariliasuchus, also from the Adamantina Formation). The mandible arches upward. The symphysis, or area where the two sides of the lower jaw meet, is formed mostly by the mandibles but also partly by the splenials. The skull preserves an antorbital fenestra, or opening in front of the eyes. The nasal, a bone at the top of the skull behind the nostrils, is relatively long. There is also a small notch at the contact between the premaxilla and the maxilla near the front of the snout.

Morrinhosuchus can be distinguished from Mariliasuchus on the basis of several unique features. For example, there is a gap between the maxilla and the palatine bone around the midline of the palate. The palate itself is also wider than that of Mariliasuchus. While the teeth of the two genera are very similar, their number and placement in the jaw differs slightly. Morrinhosuchus has seven post-caniniform teeth while Mariliasuchus has only six. There are also differences in the shape of the rostrum between the two genera, as Morrinhosuchus has a higher, more pointed snout with less constriction than in Mariliasuchus.

== Paleoecology ==
The Adamantina Formation, which is Turonian to Santonian in age, was deposited in semi-arid conditions around 95 million years ago. Morrinhosuchus was found in an outcrop of reddish sandstone with carbonate nodules, concretions, and areas of intense bioturbation. The Adamantina Formation is part of the larger Bauru Basin, from which several other notosuchians have been found. These include Sphagesaurus, Mariliasuchus, Adamantinasuchus, Armadillosuchus, and Baurusuchus.

Morrinhosuchus may have preyed upon Adamantinasuchus, Brasiliguana and mammals. It was probably eaten by Baurusuchus, Campinasuchus, Gondwanasuchus, Pissarrachampsa, Stratiotosuchus, Montealtosuchus, and Pepesuchus.
