= Coronelsuchus =

Coronelsuchus Temporal range: Late Cretaceous, Turonian

Scientific classification
- Kingdom: Animalia
- Phylum: Chordata
- Class: Reptilia
- Clade: Archosauria
- Clade: Pseudosuchia
- Clade: Crocodylomorpha
- Clade: †Notosuchia
- Genus: †Coronelsuchus; Pinheiro et al. 2021
- Species: †C. civali

Binomial name
- †Coronelsuchus civali Pinheiro et al. 2021

Extinct genus of reptiles

Coronelsuchus is an extinct genus of sphagesaurian crocodylomorph known from the Late Cretaceous Araçatuba Formation of Brazil. It contains a single species, Coronelsuchus civali.
