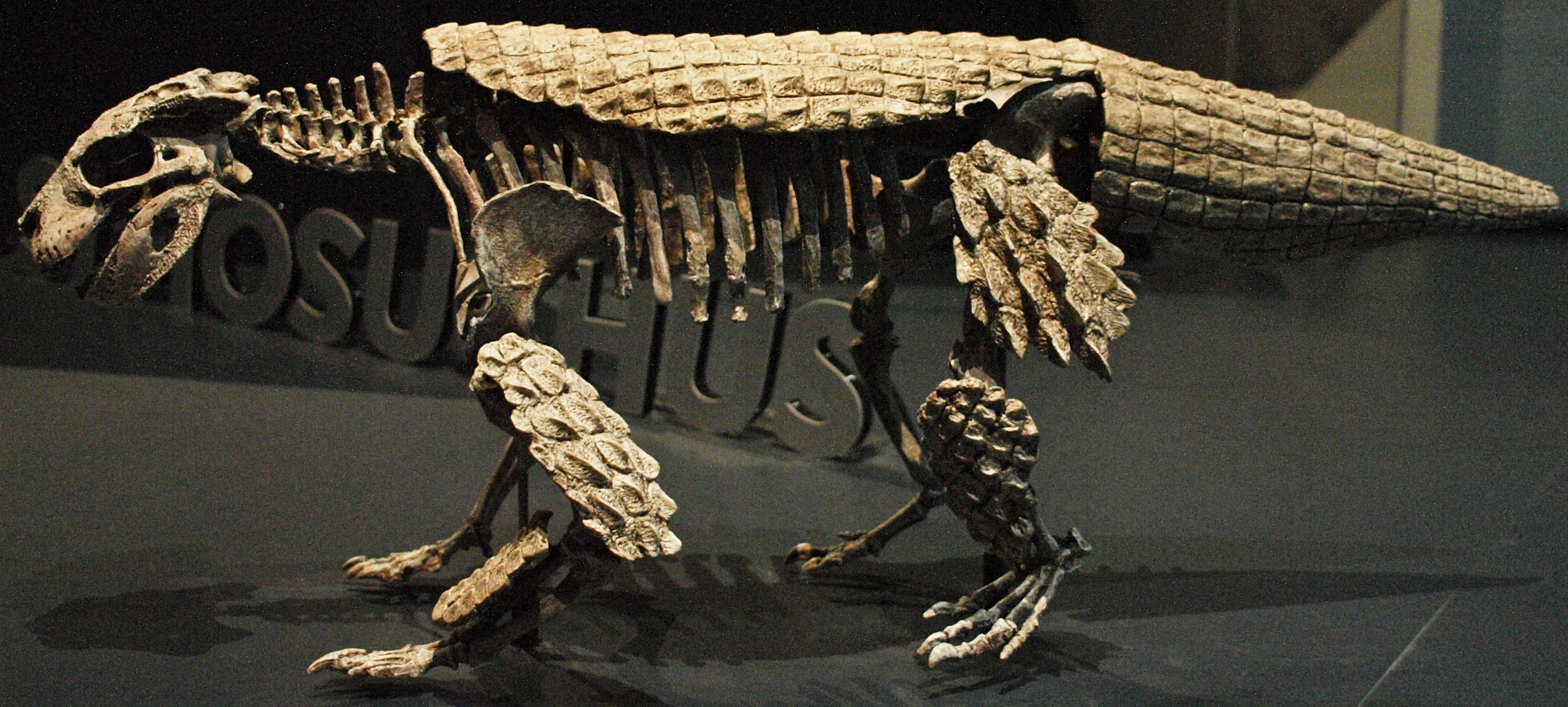
- Mounted skeleton of the small herbivorous-omnivorous notosuchian Simosuchus clarki in the Royal Ontario Museum
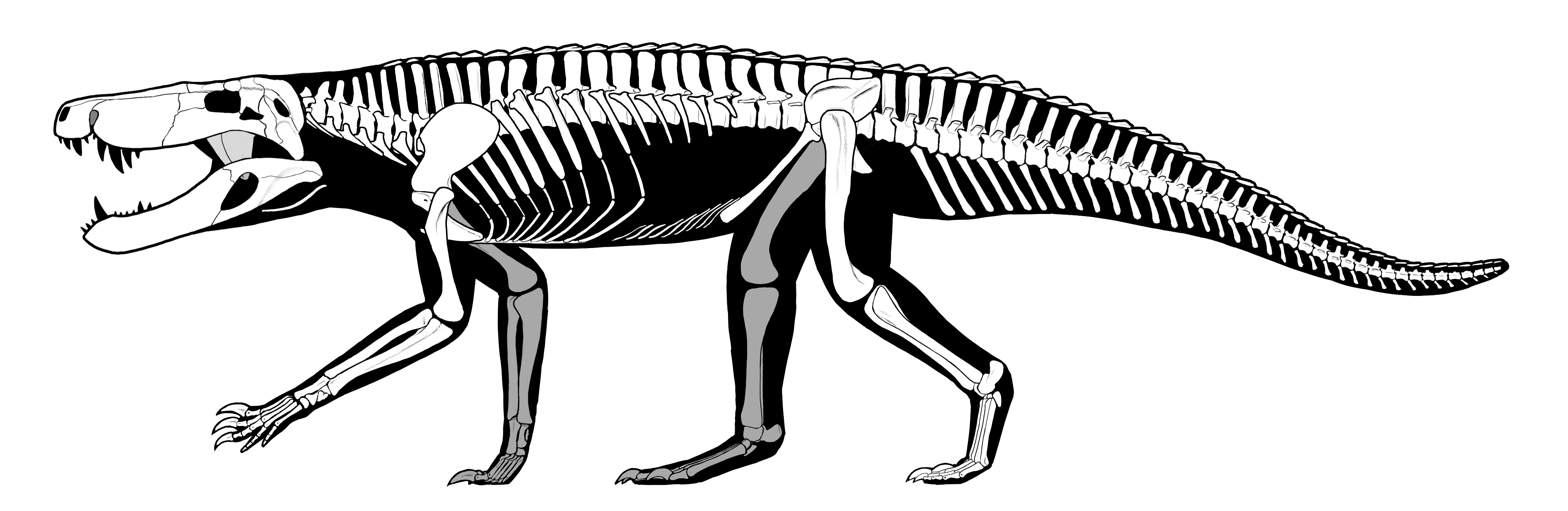
- Skeleton of the large carnivorous notosuchian Baurusuchus

Scientific classification
- Kingdom: Animalia
- Phylum: Chordata
- Class: Reptilia
- Clade: Pseudosuchia
- Clade: Crocodylomorpha
- Clade: Crocodyliformes
- Clade: Mesoeucrocodylia
- Clade: Metasuchia
- Clade: †Notosuchia; Gasparini, 1971

Families and genera
- †Uruguaysuchidae; †Peirosauria Leardi et al., 2024; †Itasuchidae; †Mahajangasuchidae; †Peirosauridae; †Ziphosuchia Ortega et al., 2000; †Libycosuchus; †Simosuchus; †Candidodontidae; †Xenodontosuchia Ruiz et al., 2021; †Chimaerasuchus; †Comahuesuchus; †Razanandrongobe?; †Sebecosuchia; †Sphagesauria Ruiz et al., 2021; †Brasileosaurus; †Coringasuchus; †Coronelsuchus; †Eptalofosuchus; †Llanosuchus; †Mariliasuchus; †Notosuchus; †Sphagesauridae

= Notosuchia =

Notosuchia Temporal range: Middle Jurassic – Late Miocene/Early Pliocene, 167–5 Ma

Extinct suborder of reptiles

Notosuchia is a clade of primarily Gondwanan mesoeucrocodylian crocodylomorphs that lived during the Jurassic and Cretaceous. Some phylogenies recover Sebecosuchia as a clade within Notosuchia, others as a sister group (see below); if Sebecosuchia is included within Notosuchia its existence is pushed into the Late Miocene or Early Pliocene, about 7 to 4.5 million years ago. Fossils have been found from South America, Africa, Asia, and Europe. Notosuchia was a clade of terrestrial crocodilians that evolved a range of feeding behaviours, including herbivory (Chimaerasuchus), omnivory (Simosuchus), and terrestrial hypercarnivory (Baurusuchus). It included many members with highly derived traits unusual for crocodylomorphs, including mammal-like teeth, flexible bands of shield-like body armor similar to those of armadillos (Armadillosuchus), and possibly fleshy cheeks and pig-like snouts (Notosuchus). The clade was first named in 1971 by Zulma Gasparini and has since undergone many phylogenetic revisions.

== Description ==
Notosuchians were generally small, with slender bodies and erect limbs. The most distinctive characteristics are usually seen in the skull. Notosuchian skulls are generally short and deep. While most are relatively narrow, some are very broad. Simosuchus has a broadened skull and jaw that resembles a pug, while Anatosuchus has a broad, flat snout like that of a duck.

The teeth vary greatly between different genera. Many have heterodont dentitions that vary in shape across the jaw. Often, there are large canine-like teeth protruding from the front of the mouth and broader molar-like teeth in the back. Some genera, such as Yacarerani and Pakasuchus, have extremely mammal-like teeth. Their molars are complex and multicuspid, and are able to occlude or fit with one another. Some forms such as Malawisuchus had jaw joints that enabled them to move the jaw back and forth in a shearing motion rather than just up and down.

A derived group of notosuchians, the baurusuchids differ considerably from other forms. They are very large in comparison to other notosuchians and are exclusively carnivorous. Baurusuchids have deep skulls and prominent canine-like teeth.

Recent research found Araripesuchus wegeneri, Armadillosuchus arrudai, Baurusuchus, Iberosuchus macrodon, and Stratiotosuchus maxhechti were ectothermic organisms

== Classification ==
=== Taxonomy ===
==== Genera ====
The evolutionary interrelationships of Notosuchia are in flux, but the following genera are generally considered notosuchians:

Genus	Age	Location	Unit	Notes	Images
Adamantinasuchus	Turonian–Santonian	Brazil	Adamantina Formation	A carnivore with a very short, high skull and large eye sockets	
Anatosuchus	Aptian–Albian	Niger	Tegama Group	A small notosuchian under 1 metre (3.3 ft) long with a duck-like snout	
Araripesuchus	Albian–Maastrichtian	Madagascar; Niger; Brazil; Argentina	Maevarano Formation; Echkar Formation; Santana Formation; Candeleros Formation	Six species are known, the most of any notosuchian	
Armadillosuchus	Turonian–Santonian	Brazil	Adamantina Formation	A sphagesaurid with armadillo-like armor shields.	
Baurusuchus	Turonian	Brazil	Adamantina Formation	A large hypercarnivore 3.5 to 4 metres (11 to 13 ft) in length	
Caipirasuchus	Turonian–Santonian	Brazil	Adamantina Formation		
Campinasuchus	Turonian–Santonian	Brazil	Adamantina Formation		
Candidodon	Albian	Brazil	Itapecuru Formation		
Chimaerasuchus	Aptian–Albian	China	Wulong Formation	The first notosuchian found with heterodont teeth, thought to be a herbivore	
Comahuesuchus	Santonian	Argentina	Bajo de la Carpa Formation		
Cynodontosuchus	Coniacian–Santonian	Argentina	Bajo de la Carpa Formation; Pichi Picun Leufu Formation		
Libycosuchus	Cenomanian	Egypt; Nigeria	Bahariya Formation		
Malawisuchus	Early Cretaceous	Malawi		A possible burrower that could move its jaw back and forth while eating	
Mariliasuchus	Campanian–Maastrichtian	Brazil	Adamantina Formation		
Morrinhosuchus	Turonian–Santonian	Brazil	Adamantina Formation		
Notosuchus	Coniacian–Santonian	Argentina	Bajo de la Carpa Formation	A notosuchian that may have had a pig-like snout	
Pakasuchus	Albian	Tanzania		A notosuchian with very complex, mammal-like heterodont teeth.	
Pissarrachampsa	Campanian–Maastrichtian	Brazil	Vale do Rio do Peixe Formation		
Razanandrongobe	Middle Jurassic (Bathonian)	Madagascar	Sakaraha Formation	The earliest known member of the group.	
Simosuchus	Maastrichtian	Madagascar		A broad-snouted omnivore with clove-shaped teeth	
Sphagesaurus	Late Cretaceous	Brazil	Adamantina Formation	An omnivorous notosuchian	
Stratiotosuchus	Turonian–Santonian	Brazil	Adamantina Formation		
Uruguaysuchus	Santonian–Campanian	Uruguay			
Wargosuchus	Santonian	Argentina	Bajo de la Carpa Formation		
Yacarerani	Turonian-Santonian	Bolivia	Cajones Formation	A notosuchian with rabbit-like incisors found in association with a probable nest	

=== Phylogeny ===
Cladograms of Notosuchia
Ortega et al., 2000
- Notosuchia
  - Notosuchus
  - - Libycosuchus
    - - Baurusuchus
      - - Iberosuchus
        - - Sebecus
          - - Itaborai crocodile
            - Bretesuchus
Pol, 2003
- Notosuchia
  - Uruguaysuchus
  - - Simosuchus
    - - - Malawisuchus
        - Candidodon
      - - Notosuchus
        - - Comahuesuchus
          - - - Chimaerasuchus
              - Sphagesaurus
            - Sebecosuchia
              - Baurusuchus
              - - Bretesuchus
                - Iberosuchus
Larsson and Sues, 2007
- Metasuchia
  - Notosuchia
    - Notosuchus
    - Malawisuchus
  - - Araripesuchus
    - - - Baurusuchus
        - - Neosuchia
          - Sebecia
            - Pabwehshi
            - - Sebecidae
                - Sebecus
                - Bretesuchus
              - Peirosauridae
  Taxa previously assigned to Notosuchia

The clade Notosuchia has undergone many recent phylogenetic revisions. In 2000, Notosuchia was proposed to be one of two groups within the clade Ziphosuchia, the other being Sebecosuchia, which included deep snouted forms such as baurusuchids and sebecids. The definition of Notosuchia by Sereno et al. (2001) is similar to that of Ziphosuchia as it includes within it Sebecosuchia. Pol (2003) also includes Sebecosuchia within Notosuchia. More recently, a phylogenetic analysis by Larsson and Sues (2007) resulted in the naming of a new clade, Sebecia, to include sebecids and peirosaurids. Baurusuchidae was considered to be polyphyletic in this study, with Pabwehshi being a basal member of Sebecia and Baurusuchus being the sister taxon to the clade containing Neosuchia and Sebecia. Thus, Sebecosuchia was no longer within Notosuchia and not considered to be a true clade, while Notosuchia was found to be a basal clade of Metasuchia.

The following cladogram simplified after the most comprehensive analysis of notosuchians as of 2014, presented by Pol et al. in 2014. It is based mainly on the data matrix published by Pol et al. (2012) which is itself a modified version of previous analyses. Thirty-one additional characters were added from other comprehensive analyses of notosuchians, e.g. Turner and Sertich (2010), Andrade et al. (2011), Montefeltro et al. (2011), Larsson and Sues (2007), and Novas et al. (2009), and 34 characters were noval, resulting in a matrix that includes 109 crocodyliforms and outgroup taxa which are scored based on 412 morphological traits.

- Notosuchia
  - - - Uruguaysuchidae
        - Araripesuchus tsangatsangana
        - - Anatosuchus
          - Araripesuchus wegeneri
        - - Araripesuchus buitreraensis
          - - Araripesuchus gomesii
            - - Araripesuchus patagonicus
              - Uruguaysuchus
      - - Stolokrosuchus
        - - Mahajangasuchidae
            - Kaprosuchus
            - Mahajangasuchus
          - Peirosauridae
            - Hamadasuchus
            - - Gasparinisuchus
              - Lomasuchus
              - Montealtosuchus
              - Uberabasuchus
    - - Candidodon
      - Ziphosuchia
        - Libycosuchus
        - - Simosuchus
          - - - Malawisuchus
              - Pakasuchus
            - - - Morrinhosuchus
                - - Notosuchus
                  - - Coringasuchus
                    - Labidiosuchus
                    - Mariliasuchus
                    - Sphagesauridae
                      - - Adamantinasuchus
                        - Yacarerani
                      - - - Caipirasuchus stenognathus
                          - - Caipirasuchus paulistanus
                            - Caipirasuchus montealtensis
                        - - Sphagesaurus
                          - - Armadillosuchus
                            - Caryonosuchus
              - - Chimaerasuchus
                - - Comahuesuchus
                  - Sebecosuchia
                    - Pabwehshi
                    - Baurusuchidae
                      - Cynodontosuchus
                      - - Pissarrachampsa
                        - - Stratiotosuchus
                          - - Campinasuchus
                            - - Baurusuchus albertoi
                              - - Baurusuchus pachecoi
                                - Baurusuchus salgadoensis
                    - - - Bergisuchus
                        - Iberosuchus
                      - Sebecidae
                        - - Lorosuchus
                          - Pehuenchesuchus
                        - - Barinasuchus
                          - - - Ayllusuchus
                              - Bretesuchus
                            - - Lumbrera form
                              - Langstonia
                              - Sebecus
                              - Zulmasuchus

This cladogram represents the results of the most comprehensive analysis of notosuchian relationships to date, performed in the description of Antaeusuchus taouzensis by Nicholl et al. 2021. It is largely based on the matrix from the above Pol et al. 2014 study, but also adding character scores from Leardi et al. 2015, Fiorelli et al. 2016, Leardi et al. 2018, and Martinez et al. 2018. The final matrix consisted of 121 taxa scored for 443 morphological traits.

- Notosuchia
  - - Uruguaysuchidae
      - Araripesuchus tsangatsangana
      - - Anatosuchus
        - Araripesuchus wegeneri
      - - Araripesuchus buitreraensis
        - - Araripesuchus gomesii
          - - Araripesuchus patagonicus
            - Uruguaysuchus
    - - Mahajangasuchidae
        - Kaprosuchus
        - Mahajangasuchus
      - Peirosauridae
        - Stolokrosuchus
        - - - Bayomesasuchus
            - - Hamadasuchus
              - Antaeusuchus
          - - - Miadanasuchus
              - Barrosasuchus
            - - Gasparinisuchus
              - Rukwasuchus
              - - Uberabasuchus
                - - Lomasuchus
                  - Montealtosuchus
  - - Candidodon
    - Ziphosuchia
      - Libycosuchus
      - - Simosuchus
        - - Neuquensuchus
          - - Pakasuchus
            - Malawisuchus
          - Xenodontosuchia
            - Sphagesauria
              - Morrinhosuchus
              - - - Llanosuchus
                  - Notosuchus
                - - Labidiosuchus
                  - Mariliasuchus
                  - Sphagesauridae
                    - - Adamantinasuchus
                      - Yacarerani
                    - - Caipirasuchus
                      - - Sphagesaurus
                        - - Caryonosuchus
                          - Armadillosuchus
            - - Chimaerasuchus
              - - Comahuesuchus
                - Razanandrongobe
                - Sebecosuchia
                  - Baurusuchidae
                    - Cynodontosuchus
                    - - Pissarrachampsa
                      - Campinasuchus
                      - - Stratiosuchus
                        - Baurusuchus
                  - - - Bergisuchus
                      - Iberosuchus
                    - Sebecidae
                      - - Ayllusuchus
                        - Bretesuchus
                      - - Barinasuchus
                        - - Ogresuchus
                          - Sebecus

== Subclades ==
There is uncertainty on the precise interrelationships between different notosuchian families. This is a summary on the phylogenetic definitions of higher-level notosuchian clades from Leardi et al. 2024.

Name	Named by	Definition	Notes
Baurusuchia	Walker, 1968	The largest clade containing Baurusuchus pachecoi, but not Sebecus icaeorhinus, Sphagesaurus huenei, Araripesuchus gomesii, Montealtosuchus arrudacamposi, and Crocodylus niloticus.	Includes the family Baurusuchidae and its closest relatives.
Eunotosuchia	Ruiz et al., 2021	The smallest clade containing Notosuchus terrestris and Uruguaysuchus aznarezi but not Crocodylus niloticus.	Would include all known notosuchians if Ururguaysuchidae are the most basal notosuchians.
Notosuchia	Gasparini, 1971	The largest clade containing Notosuchus terrestris, but not Crocodylus niloticus.	
Peirosauria	Leardi et al., 2024	The smallest clade containing Mahajangasuchus insignis, Peirosaurus torminni, Lomasuchus palpebrosus, and Itasuchus jesuinoi, provided that it does not include Sebecus icaeorhinus.	Would be invalid if sebecids are more closely related to peirosaurids than mahajangasuchids are.
Sebecia	Larsson & Sues, 2007	The largest clade containing Sebecus icaeorhinus and Lomasuchus palpebrosus, but not Baurusuchus pachecoi, Notosuchus terrestris, and Crocodylus niloticus.	Would be invalid if sebecids are more closely related to baurusuchids than to peirosaurids.
Sebecosuchia	Simpson, 1937	The smallest clade containing Sebecus icaeorhinus and Baurusuchus pachecoi, but not Araripesuchus gomesii, Montealtosuchus arrudacamposi, or Crocodylus niloticus.	Would be invalid if sebecids are more closely related to peirosaurids than to baurusuchids.
Sphagesauria	Kellner & Campos, 2007	The largest clade containing Sphagesaurus huenei, but not Baurusuchus pachecoi, Araripesuchus gomesii, Montealtosuchus arrudacamposi, Sebecus icaeorhinus, and Crocodylus niloticus.	Includes Sphagesauridae and close relatives such as Notosuchus.
Xenodontosuchia	Ruiz et al., 2021	The smallest clade containing Sphagesaurus huenei and Baurusuchus pachecoi, but not Uruguaysuchus aznarezi, Araripesuchus gomesii, Montealtosuchus arrudacamposi, and Crocodylus niloticus.	May be invalid if sebecids are closely related to peirosaurids.
Ziphosuchia	Ortega et al., 2000	The smallest clade containing Notosuchus terrestris, Libycosuchus brevirostris, Sebecus icaeorhinus, and Baurusuchus pachecoi, but not Lomasuchus palpebrosus.	
