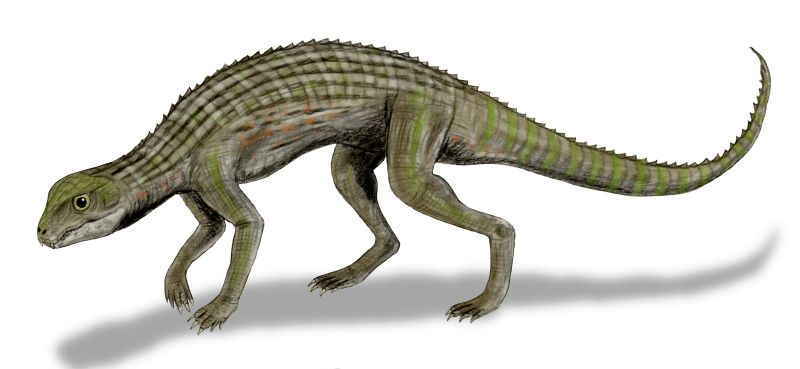
- Life restoration of Adamantinasuchus navae

Scientific classification
- Kingdom: Animalia
- Phylum: Chordata
- Class: Reptilia
- Clade: Pseudosuchia
- Clade: Crocodylomorpha
- Clade: †Notosuchia
- Clade: †Ziphosuchia
- Genus: †Adamantinasuchus; Nobre and Carvalho, 2006

Species
- †A. navae Nobre and Carvalho, 2006 (type)

= Adamantinasuchus =

Adamantinasuchus Temporal range: Late Cretaceous

Extinct genus of reptiles

Adamantinasuchus is an extinct genus of notosuchian crocodylomorph from and named after the Late Cretaceous Adamantina Formation of Brazil. It is known from only one fossil, holotype UFRJ-DG 107-R, collected by William Nava (hence the specific name navae). The fossil consists of a partial skull, fragmentary limb bones and a few broken vertebrae, and was found 25 kilometres (16 mi) southwest of the town of Marilia, near a reservoir dam. Adamantinasuchus was approximately 60 centimetres (24 in) long from nose to tail, and would have only weighed a few kilograms.

== Features ==
=== Skull ===
Adamantinasuchus's skull is quite well preserved; most of the right anterior part is present, along with some of the right posterior part, but the cranium is crushed and the left side of the skull is altogether missing. The right lower jaw is also preserved, along with many of the teeth. The skull is small, only 60 millimetres (2.4 in) long and around 30 millimetres (1.2 in) high, but the elliptical orbits are very large, almost as long as the rostrum, which might suggest the animal was nocturnal.

==== Premaxilla and maxilla ====
The premaxilla is covered in grooves and ridges, making it the most ornamented bone from the entire fossil. At the anterior end the premaxillae come together in a short triangular projection pointing ventrally and in another pointing dorsally. These would have been connected by a cartilaginous septum separating the two external nares, although this has not been preserved. The premaxilla bears two incisiform teeth and one caniniform tooth; this has led some to place it in the sphagesaurid group of crocodyliforms, since these also had differentiated teeth, although as the cladogram below suggests this is disputed. The maxillary dentition appears to bear out this theory as it bears seven molariform teeth of varying sizes. The maxilla itself is mostly triangular, with a long anteroposterior base at the ventral side of which is a thin crest that covers the border of the dental alveoli. Towards the posterior end the maxilla is elongated, and it forms a long suture with the jugal beneath the large orbits. There are two large foramina at the posterior end of the maxilla, and three small foramina at the anterior end, close to the premaxillary-maxillary border where another foramen is located.

==== Nasal, prefrontal, frontal and lacrimal ====
The nasal bone is very incompletely preserved; what there is curves around ventrally, and is slightly sculptured towards the anterior end. The nasal projects back far enough to contact the frontal bone with a thin, short blade. The prefrontal is triangular, and both left and right prefrontals are preserved, although the left prefrontal is only fragmentary. The prefrontal and frontal bones form a sinuous suture, although not a fully interdigitating one. The prefrontal's outer surface is very smooth, possibly due to contact with a palpebral bone (not preserved). The lacrimal bone is very small and has no distinguishing features, but contacts all of the nasal, prefrontal and frontal bones. The frontal is weakly convex in the middle and the anterior, but the posterior area of it is very flattened. Although the parietal bone is not preserved, the interdigitating suture between parietal and frontal is still present, as is the crest across the bone here in the medial part.

==== Postorbital, jugal and quadratojugal ====
The postorbital is fragmentary; from what is there, it is evident that it was squarish and posterolateral to the frontal bone rather than curving downwards. The jugal is thin, with a triangular transversal section and three branches. Its outer surface is smooth and there is a large foramen in the anterior section of the bone, close to the very thin crest in the medial portion that comes to a slender edge. The jugal is arched medially, curving out laterally away from the orbit, and is widest just behind the long suture with the maxilla, tapering to a bladelike portion at the posterior end. The postorbital bar is almost vertical, with an oval cross-section. The quadratojugal is just behind the laterotemporal fenestra, and is slender and branched.

==== Lower jaw ====
The lower jaw as a whole is laterally compressed and curved anteroposteriorly, so that the narrow ventral surface is convex and the jaw forms a half-moon shape. The mandibular fenestra is elliptical, and does not excavate the dentary noticeably, rather remaining between angular and surangular. The dorsal end of the dentary extends posteriorly around part of the surangular; the outer surface of the dentary is entirely smooth. The surangular has a triangular cross-section and is tallest in the anterior portion. A lateral projection extends from it to partially cover the mandibular fenestra. At the posterior end the surangular is closer to cylindrical. The angular is medially excavated by the mandibular fenestra, and forms a vertical contact zone with the dentary; at the posterior end, it is vertically expanded upwards to form a narrow blade. The dentary carries three teeth on the preserved portion, which closely resemble those on the maxilla.

==== Teeth ====
The teeth are noticeably heterodont in Adamantinasuchus, with a mixture of incisiform, caniniform and molariform teeth. The first two teeth in the premaxilla are incisiform; they are small, pointed and conical, and they bear small grooves. The third premaxillary tooth is caniniform and is much larger than the incisiform teeth, though it is a similar conical shape. Its tip points slightly backwards, and the crown bears small grooves. All seven maxillary teeth are molariform, though they vary greatly in size; the first three and the last two are much smaller than the two middle ones, only about half the size overall. All the maxillary teeth have one deep root, oval in cross-section, and there is a slight constriction between this and the crown of the teeth, which are flattened obliquely to produce a spatulate shape. The outer surfaces of the maxillary teeth are smooth and bear a few grooves, whereas the inner surfaces are covered in denticles that grow smaller towards the tip of each tooth. The two large central molariform teeth have a second set of denticles around the base of the inner surface of each tooth. Only three teeth are preserved on the dentary, one of which contacts a maxillary tooth's inner surface with its outer surface. The denticles on this tooth's outer surface perfectly match up with those of the inner surface of the maxillary tooth, forming a chisel contact surface for grinding or cutting food.

=== Forelimbs ===
The humeri are entirely missing from the holotype. The radius and ulna are present but very poorly preserved; only the straight and cylindrical diaphysis of the radius is visible, and a small fraction of the ulna. This is, however, enough to show that it is bowed, typically for a crocodyliform. The radius's proximal extremity is wider than its distal extremity; the ulna's proximal portion is also wide, about three times the thickness of the diaphysis. The metacarpals and a few phalanges are also preserved, showing that they both have laterally expanded extremities but that other than this the phalanges are cylindrical.

=== Hindlimbs ===
The femora are both partially preserved, and each femur is quite robust, with an expanded head. The fourth trochanter forms a rugose crest, stopping just before a slight torsion in the diaphysis. The tibia is poorly preserved, but its diaphysis is straight and cylindrical. The fibula's diaphysis is oval in cross-section and expands towards a flattened distal end; its proximal end is missing.

== Diet ==
Adamantinasuchus's teeth seem to be quite well adapted for an omnivorous diet, since they are heterodont and have well-developed molariform teeth - it might, like Chimaerasuchus, have included plants in its diet. There is insufficient preservation of the quadrate or the articular bones to tell whether its jaw was capable of back-and-forth movements necessary for chewing plants, but the relative lack of wear on its molariform teeth suggest that it was probably only capable of dorsoventral biting motions, not chewing, and that it mainly ate softer food than plants. The teeth were also wider laterally than anteroposteriorly, which might have made back-and-forth chewing motions difficult or impossible; it is therefore probable that Adamantinasuchus was mainly carnivorous or a scavenger of small corpses, since the incisiform and caniniform teeth would have been useful for seizing its prey or pulling strips of flesh off a carcass while the molariform teeth could have chewed it up.

== Phylogeny ==
Below is a cladogram modified from O’Connor et al., 2010:

- Notosuchia
  - Uruguaysuchus
  - - - Libycosuchus
      - - Malawisuchus
        - Candidodon
        - - Mariliasuchus
          - - Pakasuchus
            - Adamantinasuchus
    - - Simosuchus
      - - Notosuchus
        - - Chimaerasuchus
          - - Sphagesaurus
            - - Comahuesuchus
              - Baurusuchus
