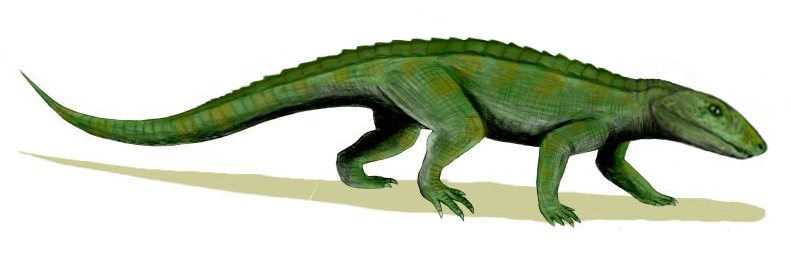
- Life restoration of Notosuchus terrestris

Scientific classification
- Domain: Eukaryota
- Kingdom: Animalia
- Phylum: Chordata
- Class: Reptilia
- Clade: Archosauria
- Clade: Pseudosuchia
- Clade: Crocodylomorpha
- Clade: Crocodyliformes
- Clade: †Notosuchia
- Clade: †Sphagesauria
- Family: †Notosuchidae; Dollo, 1924

Genera
- †Brasileosaurus?; †Llanosuchus; †Mariliasuchus; †Notosuchus

= Notosuchidae =

Notosuchidae Temporal range: 90–66 Ma Turonian - Maastrichtian

Family of crocodylomorphs

Notosuchidae is a Gondwanan family of notosuchians. They were small-bodied terrestrial crocodyliforms that lived during the Late Cretaceous.
