= Llanosuchus =

Llanosuchus Temporal range: Late Cretaceous, 84.9–70.6 Ma

Scientific classification
- Kingdom: Animalia
- Phylum: Chordata
- Class: Reptilia
- Clade: Archosauria
- Clade: Pseudosuchia
- Clade: Crocodylomorpha
- Clade: †Notosuchia
- Genus: †Llanosuchus; Fiorelli et al., 2016
- Species: †L. tamaensis

Binomial name
- †Llanosuchus tamaensis Fiorelli et al., 2016

Extinct genus of reptiles

Llanosuchus is an extinct genus of notosuchian mesoeucrocodylian known from the Late Cretaceous Los Llanos Formation in Argentina. It contains a single species, L. tamaensis.
