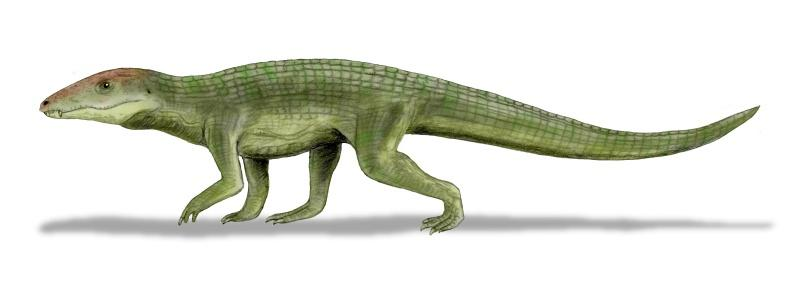

Scientific classification
- Domain: Eukaryota
- Kingdom: Animalia
- Phylum: Chordata
- Class: Reptilia
- Clade: Archosauria
- Clade: Pseudosuchia
- Clade: Crocodylomorpha
- Clade: Crocodyliformes
- Clade: †Notosuchia
- Family: †Uruguaysuchidae
- Genus: †Uruguaysuchus; Rusconi, 1933

Type species
- †Uruguaysuchus aznarezi Rusconi, 1933

Synonyms
- Uruguaysuchus terrai Rusconi, 1933

= Uruguaysuchus =

Uruguaysuchus Temporal range: Late Cretaceous, Campanian–Maastrichtian

Extinct genus of reptiles

Uruguaysuchus is an extinct genus of crocodyliforms from the Late Cretaceous Guichón Formation of Uruguay. It was related to Simosuchus and Malawisuchus. It was of small to moderate size reaching an estimated length of 120 centimetres (3.9 ft).
