= Candidodon =

Candidodon Temporal range: Albian ~112–100 Ma

Scientific classification
- Kingdom: Animalia
- Phylum: Chordata
- Class: Reptilia
- Clade: Archosauria
- Clade: Pseudosuchia
- Clade: Crocodylomorpha
- Clade: †Notosuchia
- Family: †Candidodontidae
- Genus: †Candidodon; Carvalho & Campos 1988

Species
- †C. itapecuruense Carvalho & Campos 1988 (type)

Extinct genus of reptiles

Candidodon is an extinct genus of notosuchian mesoeucrocodylian. Fossils have been found in the Early Cretaceous Itapecuru Formation and Alcântara Formation in Brazil.

== Description ==
The genus is characterized by a particularly elongate pair of choanae in its palate. It has been named the type genus of the family Candidodontidae, first constructed in 2004. It was initially assigned to the family with a proposed sister genus, Mariliasuchus, but a recent phylogenetic analysis has shown that Mariliasuchus may instead be closer in relation to Comahuesuchus than to Candidodon and thus a member of the family Comahuesuchidae. If this is true, Candidodon would be the only member of the family Candidodontidae.
