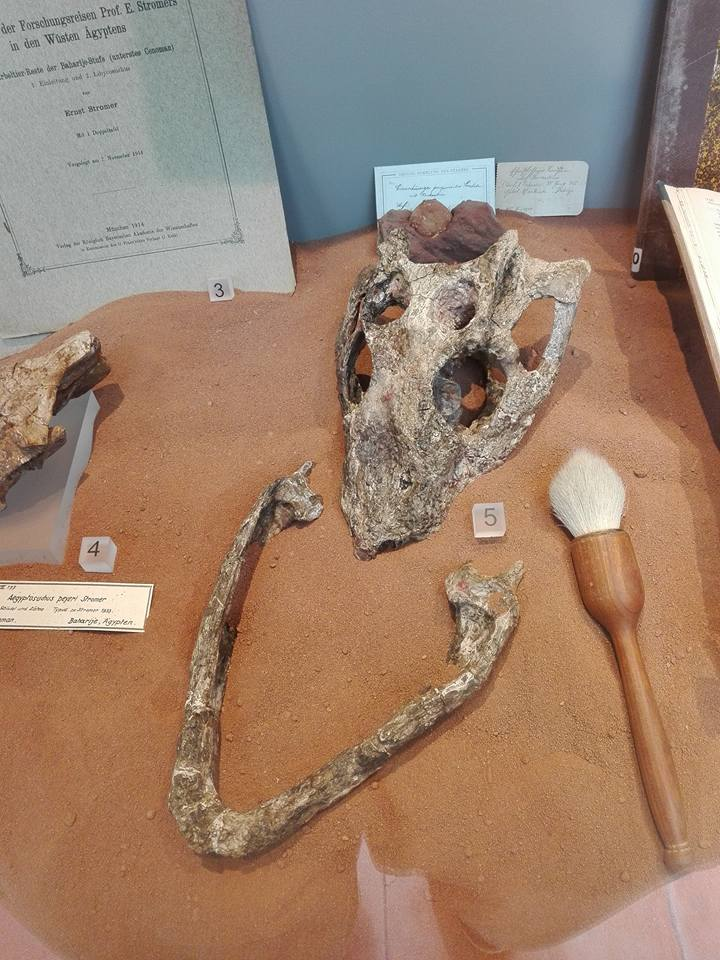
- Holotype skull and jaw

Scientific classification
- Domain: Eukaryota
- Kingdom: Animalia
- Phylum: Chordata
- Class: Reptilia
- Clade: Archosauria
- Clade: Pseudosuchia
- Clade: Crocodylomorpha
- Clade: Crocodyliformes
- Clade: †Notosuchia
- Clade: †Eunotosuchia
- Genus: †Libycosuchus; Stromer 1914
- Species: †L. brevirostris

Binomial name
- †Libycosuchus brevirostris Stromer, 1914

Synonyms
- Libycosuchus Stromer, 1915 (preoccupied); Lybicosuchus Nascimento and Zaher, 2011 (sic)

= Libycosuchus =

Libycosuchus Temporal range: Late Cretaceous, 95 Ma

Extinct genus of reptiles

Libycosuchus is an extinct genus of North African crocodyliform possibly related to Notosuchus; it is part of the monotypic Libycosuchidae and Libycosuchinae. It was terrestrial, living approximately 95 million years ago in the Cenomanian stage of the Late Cretaceous. Fossil remains have been found in the Bahariya Formation in Egypt, making it contemporaneous with the crocodilian Stomatosuchus, and dinosaurs, including the famous Spinosaurus.

== Discovery and naming ==
The holotype was discovered during the early 1910s by Richard Markgraf, and the type species, L. brevirostis, was named in 1914 and described in 1915.

It was one of the few fossils described by Ernst Stromer that wasn't destroyed by the Royal Air Force during the bombing of Munich in 1944.
