= Heterodont =

Animals which have more than a single tooth morphology

Tooth shape changes within the jaw (homodont to heterodont). SEMs of adult lower jaws. (A) Homodont unicuspid snake, Python molurus, (B) homodont gecko, Paroedura picta, (C) homodont tricuspid Monitor lizard, Varanus niloticus, (D) heterodont anole, Anolis allisoni. (D′) Tricuspid teeth of the posterior jaw at the back of the mouth. (D″) Unicuspid teeth of the anterior jaw at the front of the mouth. Scale bar = 1 mm (A–D) and 200 μm (D′,D″).

In anatomy, a heterodont (from Greek, meaning 'different teeth') is an animal which possesses more than a single tooth morphology and/or exhibit considerable size variation within the tooth row. Human dentition is heterodont and diphyodont as an example. Members of the Synapsida (including mammals) generally possess incisors, canines ("dogteeth"), premolars, and molars. The presence of heterodont dentition is evidence of some degree of feeding and or hunting specialization in a species. In contrast, homodont or isodont dentition refers to a set of teeth that possess the same tooth morphology.

In invertebrates, the term heterodont refers to a condition where teeth of differing sizes occur in the hinge plate, a part of the Bivalvia.
