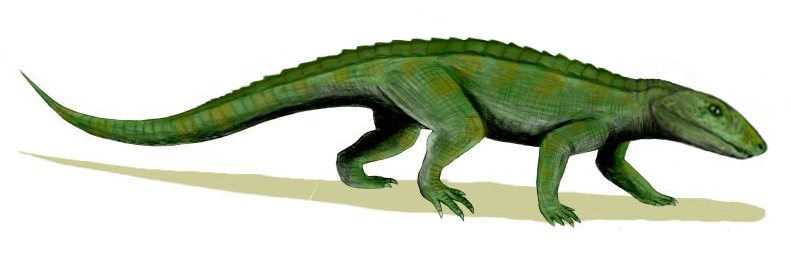
- Life restoration of Notosuchus terrestris

Scientific classification
- Kingdom: Animalia
- Phylum: Chordata
- Class: Reptilia
- Clade: Archosauria
- Clade: Pseudosuchia
- Clade: Crocodylomorpha
- Clade: †Notosuchia
- Family: †Notosuchidae
- Genus: †Notosuchus; Woodward, 1896

Species
- N. terrestris Woodward, 1896 (type); N. lepidus Saez, 1957

= Notosuchus =

Notosuchus Temporal range: Late Cretaceous, 85 Ma

Extinct genus of reptiles

Notosuchus (/noʊtəˈsuːkəs/; 'southern crocodile') is an extinct genus of South American notosuchian crocodyliforms. It was terrestrial, living approximately 85 million years ago in the Santonian stage of the Late Cretaceous.

== Description ==
Its fossilised remains have been found in the Bajo de la Carpa Formation in Patagonia, Argentina. First named in 1896, Notosuchus was the first known notosuchian. The type species is N. terrestris. A second species, N. lepidus, was named in 1957.

A paper published in 2008 by Fiorelli and Calvo described new remains of the type species N. terrestris. In it, the authors suggested that the skull would have supported a short trunk, or "hog's snout" as well as fleshy upper and lower lips. The anteriorly directed nares and the absence of a bony nasal septum (which presumably indicates cartilaginous tissue serving its place) provide evidence for a trunk-like snout, while striations on the surface of the nasal bones and the lower jaw most likely acted as attachment points for the nasolabial muscles and the depressor muscle, respectively. Additionally, the authors suggested that a lateral rim on the dentary as well as numerous aligned neurovascular foramina are evidence of soft cheek-like muscular tissue. The function of the trunk was likely used for searching for food by sniffing the ground in a manner similar to extant suids and peccaries, while the cheeks would aid in mastication by preventing food loss. A re-description of the skull material has since lent evidence toward minimal soft-tissue enhancement to the snout of Notosuchus.

The dentition of N. terrestris were heterodont and consisted of incisiform, caniniform, and molariform teeth. The teeth of N. terrestris had exceptionally thick cementum compared to other crocodylomorphs. They also had thick enamel, much like baurusuchids. Their teeth grew slowly, as evidenced by the lines of von Ebner found in their dentine.
