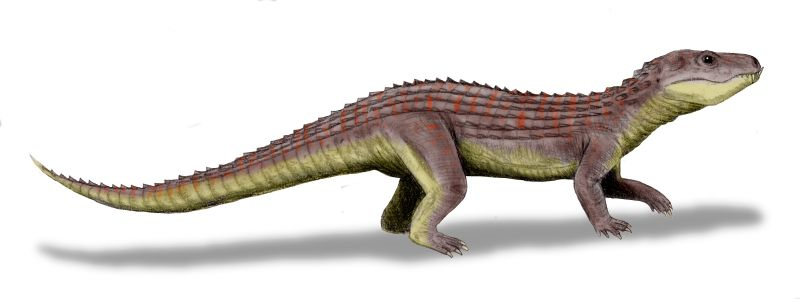
- Mariliasuchus amarali

Scientific classification
- Kingdom: Animalia
- Phylum: Chordata
- Class: Reptilia
- Clade: Pseudosuchia
- Clade: Crocodylomorpha
- Clade: †Notosuchia
- Family: †Notosuchidae
- Genus: †Mariliasuchus; Carvalho and Bertini, 1999

Species
- †M. amarali Carvalho and Bertini, 1999 (type); †M. robustus Nobre et al., 2007

= Mariliasuchus =

Mariliasuchus Temporal range: Late Cretaceous ~84.9–66.0 Ma

Extinct genus of reptiles

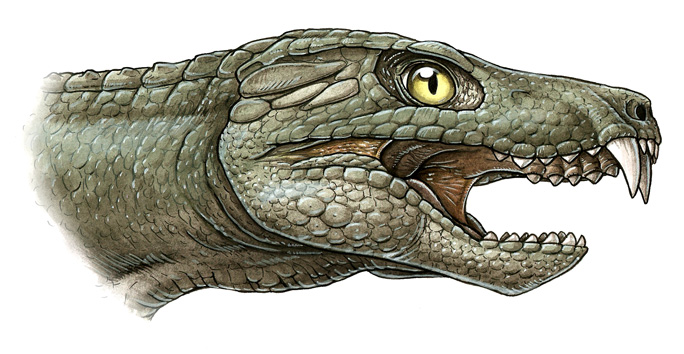
Reconstruction of the head of Mariliasuchus amarali

Mariliasuchus ("Marilia crocodile") is an extinct genus of Late Cretaceous notosuchian crocodyliforms found near Marilia, Brazil. The first bone remains were found and collected in 1995 by Brazilian paleontologist William Nava, in red rocks from the fossiliferous Adamantina Formation. Four years later, it was described as Mariliasuchus amarali, by Brazilian paleontologists Ismar de Souza Carvalho and Reinaldo J. Bertini.

Its type species is M. amarali, which was named in honour of Sérgio Estanislaw do Amaral, Brazilian naturalist. A second species, M. robustus, was named in 2007.

== Discovery ==
Several specimens of M. amarali have been found close to eggs, eggshells and coprolites to date: UFRJ DG 50-R (holotype): a partially complete and articulated skeleton, including a nearly complete skull and partially preserved axial and appendicular skeletons. It belongs to a juvenile specimen. UFRJ DG 105-R. UFRJ DG 106-R. MZSP-PV 50. MZSP-PV 51. MN 6298-V. MN 6756-V. URC R 67. URC R 68. URC R 69. MPM 114 Ic V - 4 eggs. MPM 115 R. MPM 116 R. MPM 117 R. MPM 119 R.

All of these specimens have been recovered in a road cut, 10 kilometres (6.2 mi) south from the city of Marilia, in outcrops known as "Estrada Velha" pto. 1 and 2. They come from the upper part of the Adamantina Formation, indicating a Late Cretaceous (possibly Campanian/Maastrichtian) age. The findings by William Nava could be found in the National Museum of Brazil, but they were partially destroyed in the 2018's National Museum of Brazil fire.

== Classification ==
A phylogenetic analysis done by Zaher et al. (2006) found Mariliasuchus amarali to share a close relationship with Comahuesuchus. Andrade et al. (2006), while studying the palate and choanae of some mesoeucrocodylians, reached this same conclusion. Though no name was given to this clade in either publication, it is referred in this article as Comahuesuchidae.

== Palaeobiology ==
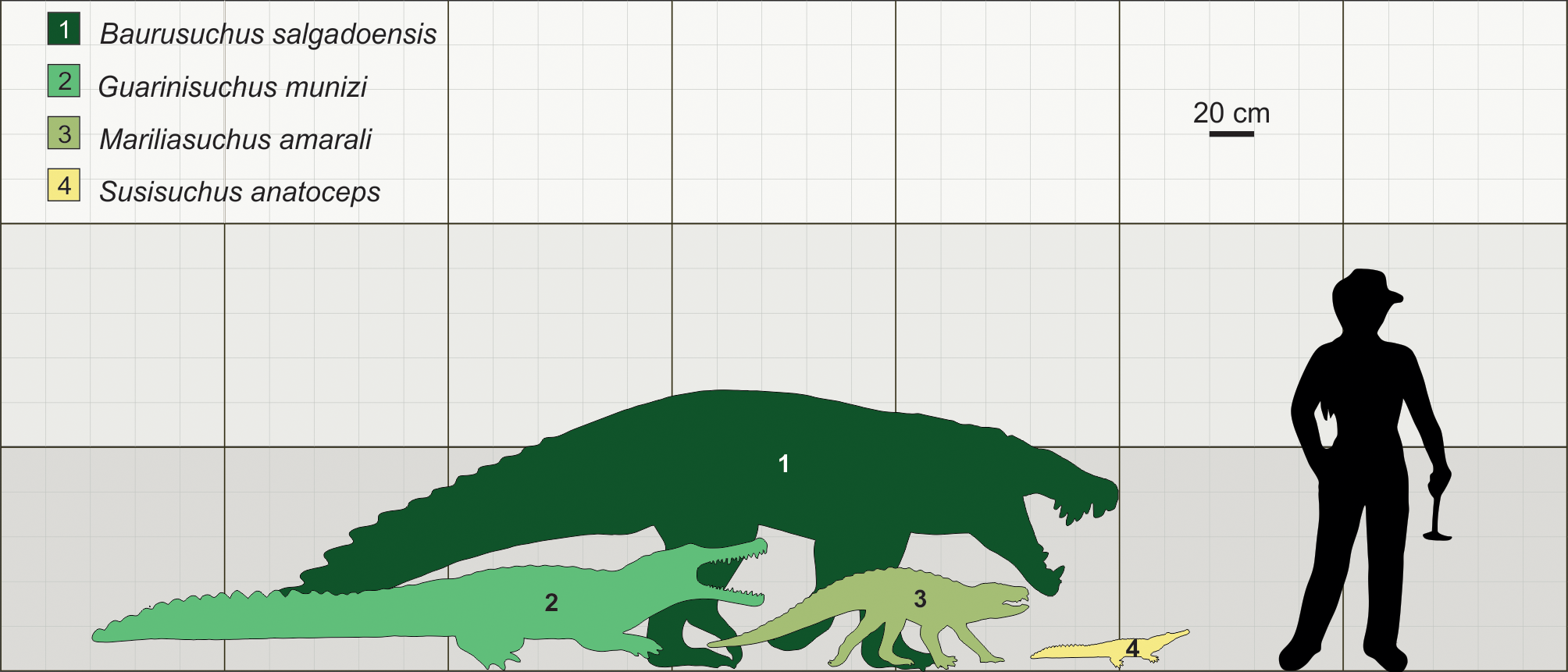
Size (3) compared to other Brazilian Cretaceous Crocodylomorphs

Mariliasuchus, unlike modern crocodylians, was an animal of terrestrial habits (though see below). Its nostrils were located on the front of the skull, unlike modern crocodiles, in which the nostrils face upwards, to help the animal breathe while its almost completely submerged. Furthermore, the eyes in M. amarali are faced laterally (in modern crocodiles they face upwards). It had a very modified dentition, differentiated in incisiforms, caniforms and molariforms. Strangely, in particular, were the anterior-most teeth, which were directed horizontally rather than vertically. The function of this strange arrangement is not yet clear, but comparisons have been made with the dentition of pigs, indicating that their dietary preferences may be convergent. It also had strong jaw muscles, indicating a good degree of mandibular activity. The thickness and uneven distribution of the enamel of Mariliasuchus suggests it may have consumed plants to some degree. The enamel microstructure of M. amarali further supports the notion that this animal had an omnivorous diet with a considerable degree of hard object feeding.

There seems to be a significant degree of variation between specimens of M. amarali. Some of this is related to ontogenetic variation, but some may also suggest sexual dimorphism, or even that some of the specimens assigned to this species belong to a different animal.

Ontogenetic studies done by Vasconcellos and Carvalho (2005) concluded that during its growth, the skull of M. amarali individuals becomes shorter and the skull more resistant, while being laterally compressed. In adulthood, the orbit has a less circular arrangement than in younger individuals.

The postcranial skeleton of Mariliasuchus amarali displays a mixture of traits similar to those present in the skeleton of Cretaceous terrestrial crocodyliform Notosuchus and traits present in aquatic eusuchian crocodyliform, including living crocodilians. Nobre and Carvalho (2013) inferred that Mariliasuchus did not have an erect or semi-erect posture, but rather a sprawling posture and, possibly, had amphibian habits similar to those of living crocodilians.
