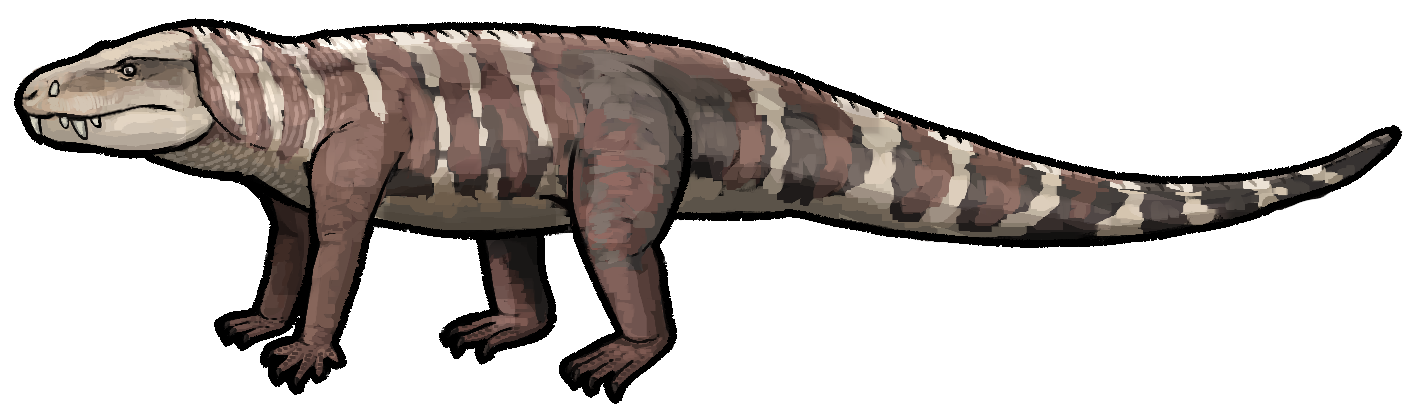

Scientific classification
- Kingdom: Animalia
- Phylum: Chordata
- Class: Reptilia
- Clade: Pseudosuchia
- Clade: Crocodylomorpha
- Clade: †Notosuchia
- Family: †Baurusuchidae
- Subfamily: †Baurusuchinae
- Genus: †Aphaurosuchus; Darlim, Montefeltro, and Langer, 2021

Type species
- †Aphaurosuchus escharafacies Darlim, Montefeltro, and Langer, 2021

Other species
- †Aphaurosuchus kaiju Martins et al., 2023

= Aphaurosuchus =

Aphaurosuchus Temporal range: Late Cretaceous, Coniacian–Campanian

Extinct genus of baurusuchidae

Aphaurosuchus is an extinct genus of baurusuchid mesoeucrocodylian known from the Late Cretaceous Bauru Basin of São Paulo, southern Brazil. It contains two species, Aphaurosuchus escharafacies and Aphaurosuchus kaiju.

== Discovery and naming ==
In 2012, the Laboratório de Paleontologia lead an expedition to the municipality of Jales, São Paulo State, excavating at the Fazenda Furnas site which had yielded baurusuchid remains during previous digs. This site, belonging to the Adamantina Formation/Vale do Rio do Peixe Formation, contained a nearly complete baurusuchid skeleton, specimen LPRP/USP 0697, broken into six main blocks. The first block contains the skull, all cervical vertebrae with associated osteoderms as well as the first four thoracic vertebrae, both scapulae and articulated coracoids. The second block is made up of most of the postcranial skeletal from the 8th thoracic to the 9th caudal vertebra with the associated double row of parasagittal osteoderms, the posterior thoracic ribs, gastralia, right forelimb, pelvic girdle and most of the hindlimbs. The humerus was originally preserved, however lost during the excavations. The left manus and left pes are preserved in individual blocks and two segments of caudal vertebrae have also been preserved as blocks. The placement in relation to one another is however unclear due to poor preservation of the anterior vertebrae of the more distally located caudal block. Two isolated caudals with osteoderms have also been discovered as well as rib fragments of uncertain placement.

A second, much more fragmentary species was named in 2023 based on various skull remains including parts of the mandible, the palate, isolated teeth and the cranium in front of and above the eyes. A. kaiju also stems from the Adamantina Formation.

The genus name is composed of the Greek words ἀφαυρός (aphauros), meaning "feeble" or "powerless" in reference to the weak biteforce determined by Montefeltro et al. (2020), and σοῦχος (souchos) for crocodile. During excavation a rocksaw left a cut on the left jugal and dentary of the holotype of A. escharafacies, earning it the nickname "Scarface", which is the basis of the species epithet. Eschara (ἐσχάρα) meaning scar in Greek and the Latin facies meaning face. The second species was named "kaiju", a Japanese word translating to "strange beast" that is commonly associated with pop-culture monsters such as Godzilla.

== Description ==
The skull of Aphaurosuchus is well preserved, showing the bones that make up its lateral, dorsal and ventral surface, there is however some damage in the area where the premaxillae connect to the paired nasal, making the exact anatomy of the nares hard to determine. The skull is deep and lateromedially compressed with a rostrum that makes up less than 55% of the basal skull length. The compression is the most extreme just behind the last maxillary teeth, before expanding laterally. The dorsal surface is highly ornamented, especially around the area where the maxillae contact the nasals. Like other baurusuchids Aphaurosuchus has a prominent, semi-circular notch between the maxillae and premaxillae that makes space for the lower caniniform teeth. Also like other baurusuchids, this taxa has a highly reduced number of teeth with 4 teeth in each half of the premaxillae followed by 5 maxillary teeth on each side. The largest maxillary tooth almost extends to the ventral margin of the dentary. The tooth count of the dentary is similarly reduced, containing 10 teeth on each dentary, largest of which being the aforementioned caniniform that sits in the 4th dentary alveola. Notably, Aphaurosuchus preserves a notched border between of the quadrate-quadratojugal contact, previously believed to have been a synapomorphy of pissarrachampsine baurusuchids.

== Phylogeny ==
Aphaurosuchus' placement within Baurusuchidae was determined using an expanded version of the matrix by Godoy et al., (2014). The single Most Parsimonious Tree (MPT) resulting from this can be seen below.

- Notosuchia
  - Notosuchus
  - - Mariliasuchus
    - - Armadillosuchus
      - Baurusuchidae
        - Cynodontosuchus
        - - Gondwanasuchus
          - - Pissarrachampsinae
              - Campinasuchus
              - - Pissarrachampsa
                - Wargosuchus
            - Baurusuchinae
              - Aphaurosuchus
              - - Aplestosuchus
                - - Stratiotosuchus
                  - Baurusuchus
                    - B. albertoi
                    - - B. salgadoensis
                      - B. pachecoi

Aphaurosuchus was recovered as the basal most member of Baurusuchinae, with Aplestosuchus and Stratiotosuchus being successive sister taxa to a monophyletic Baurusuchus. The discovery of this taxon prompted some revisions to the definition of the two major baurusuchid clades, as Aphaurosuchus showcases features previously assumed to have been synapomorphies of Pissarrachampsinae. However new synapomorphies were identified for both baurusuchines and pissarrachampsines. Overall Aphaurosuchus showcases all but one of the baurusuchine synapomorphies and two of the three previously described pissarrachampsine synapomorphies (sensu Montefeltro et al., 2011). This is reflected by the phylogenetic tree recovering it as being nested closely to the dichotomy of the two clades. This unique combination of features may be read as a "zone of variability", wherein plesiomorphies persist across speciation and are to be read as homoplasies.
