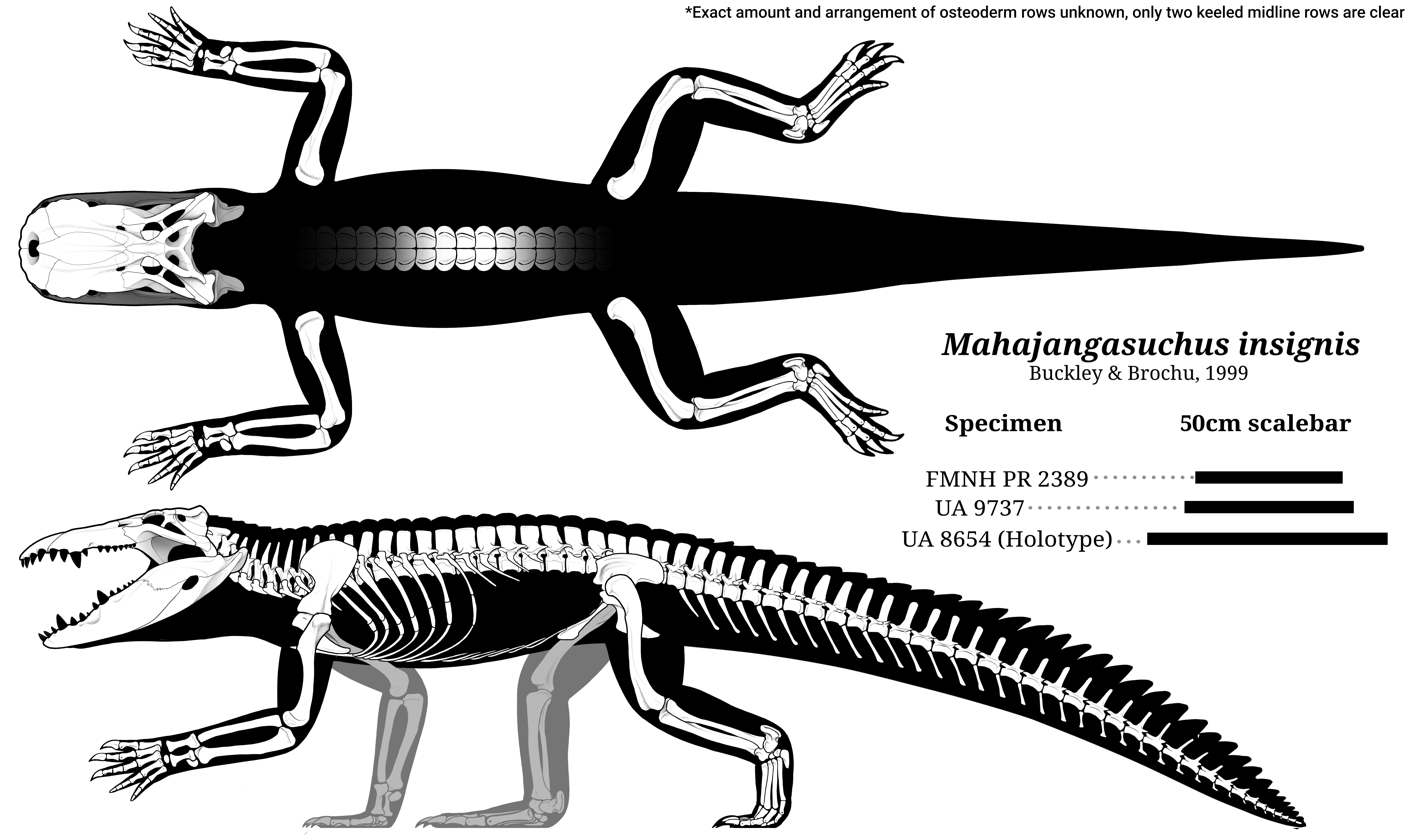
- Mahajangasuchus insignis
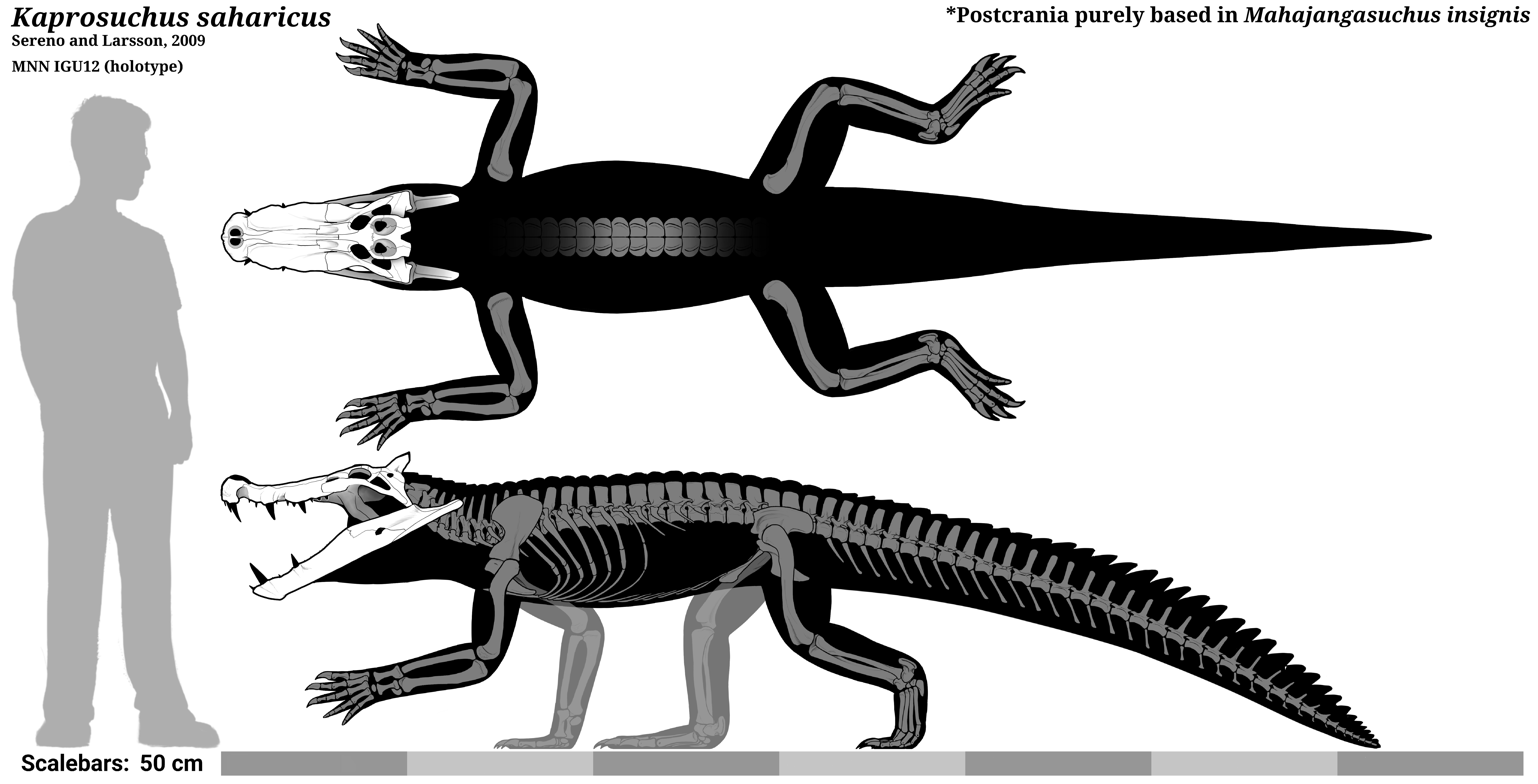
- Kaprosuchus saharicus

Scientific classification
- Kingdom: Animalia
- Phylum: Chordata
- Class: Reptilia
- Clade: Pseudosuchia
- Clade: Crocodylomorpha
- Clade: †Notosuchia
- Clade: †Peirosauria
- Family: †Mahajangasuchidae; Sereno and Larsson, 2009

Type genus
- †Mahajangasuchus Buckley & Brochu, 1998

Genera
- †Kaprosuchus; †Mahajangasuchus (type)

= Mahajangasuchidae =

Mahajangasuchidae Temporal range: 95–66 Ma Cenomanian - Maastrichtian

Extinct family of reptiles

Mahajangasuchidae is an extinct family of notosuchian crocodyliforms. It currently contains two genera, Mahajangasuchus and Kaprosuchus, both of which lived during the Late Cretaceous in Gondwana. It is defined as the most inclusive clade containing Mahajangasuchus insignis but not Notosuchus terrestris, Simosuchus clarki, Araripesuchus gomesii, Baurusuchus pachecoi, Peirosaurus torminni, Goniopholis crassidens, Pholidosaurus schaumbergensis, or Crocodylus niloticus. Phylogenetically, Mahajangasuchidae is placed just outside pholidosaurids and more derived neosuchians.

Defining characters of the family include fused nasals, a jaw articulation below the posterior maxillary tooth row, a deep mandibular symphysis that is oriented anterodorsally, and the formation of a hornlike posterodorsal process from the squamosal and parietal (which is much more pronounced in Kaprosuchus).

== Phylogeny ==
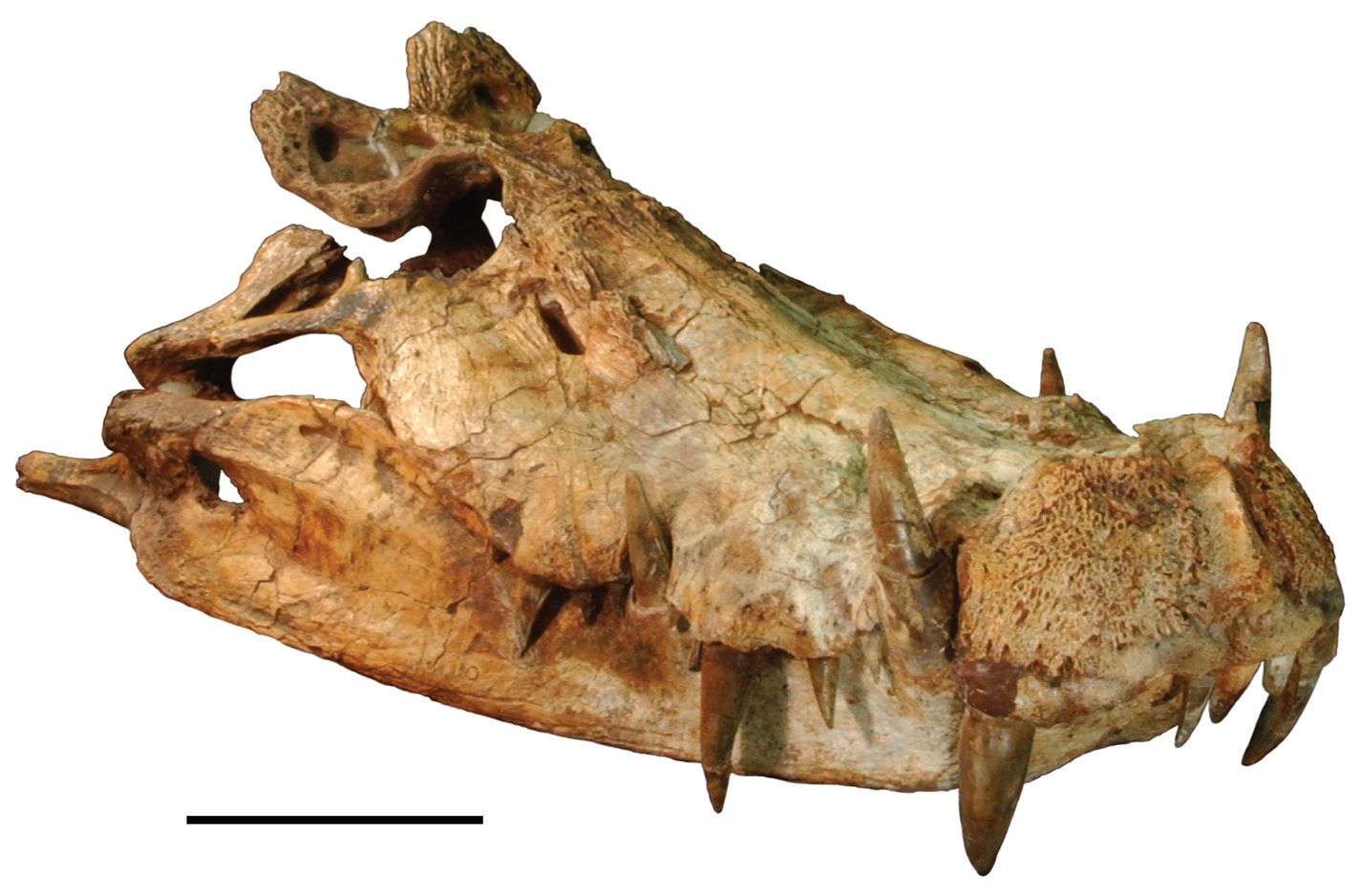
Skull of Kaprosuchus saharicus

Cladogram showing the phylogenetic relationship of Mahajangasuchidae within Neosuchia after Sereno and Larsson, 2009:

- Neosuchia
  - Sebecia
  - unnamed
    - Mahajangasuchidae
      - Mahajangasuchus
      - Kaprosuchus
    - unnamed
      - Pholidosauridae
      - unnamed
        - Laganosuchus
        - unnamed
          - Bernissartia
          - unnamed
            - Isisfordia
            - Crocodylia

In 2014, Mahajangasuchidae were grouped within Notosuchia:

- Notosuchia
  - - - Uruguaysuchidae
        - Araripesuchus tsangatsangana
        - - Anatosuchus
          - Araripesuchus wegeneri
        - - Araripesuchus buitreraensis
          - - Araripesuchus gomesii
            - - Araripesuchus patagonicus
              - Uruguaysuchus
      - - Stolokrosuchus
        - - Mahajangasuchidae
            - Kaprosuchus
            - Mahajangasuchus
          - Peirosauridae
            - Hamadasuchus
            - - Gasparinisuchus
              - Lomasuchus
              - Montealtosuchus
              - Uberabasuchus
    - - Candidodon
      - Ziphosuchia
        - Libycosuchus
        - - Simosuchus
          - - - Malawisuchus
              - Pakasuchus
            - - - Morrinhosuchus
                - - Notosuchus
                  - - Coringasuchus
                    - Labidiosuchus
                    - Mariliasuchus
                    - Sphagesauridae
                      - - Adamantinasuchus
                        - Yacarerani
                      - - - Caipirasuchus stenognathus
                          - - Caipirasuchus paulistanus
                            - Caipirasuchus montealtensis
                        - - Sphagesaurus
                          - - Armadillosuchus
                            - Caryonosuchus
              - - Chimaerasuchus
                - - Comahuesuchus
                  - Sebecosuchia
                    - Pabwehshi
                    - Baurusuchidae
                      - Cynodontosuchus
                      - - Pissarrachampsa
                        - - Stratiotosuchus
                          - - Campinasuchus
                            - - Baurusuchus albertoi
                              - - Baurusuchus pachecoi
                                - Baurusuchus salgadoensis
                    - - - Bergisuchus
                        - Iberosuchus
                      - Sebecidae
                        - - Lorosuchus
                          - Pehuenchesuchus
                        - - Barinasuchus
                          - - - Ayllusuchus
                              - Bretesuchus
                            - - Lumbrera form
                              - Langstonia
                              - Sebecus
                              - Zulmasuchus

The cladogram following by Nicholl et al. 2021:

- Notosuchia
  - - Uruguaysuchidae
      - Araripesuchus tsangatsangana
      - - Anatosuchus
        - Araripesuchus wegeneri
      - - Araripesuchus buitreraensis
        - - Araripesuchus gomesii
          - - Araripesuchus patagonicus
            - Uruguaysuchus
    - - Mahajangasuchidae
        - Kaprosuchus
        - Mahajangasuchus
      - Peirosauridae
        - Stolokrosuchus
        - - - Bayomesasuchus
            - - Hamadasuchus
              - Antaeusuchus
          - - - Miadanasuchus
              - Barrosasuchus
            - - Gasparinisuchus
              - Rukwasuchus
              - - Uberabasuchus
                - - Lomasuchus
                  - Montealtosuchus
  - - Candidodon
    - Ziphosuchia
      - Libycosuchus
      - - Simosuchus
        - - Neuquensuchus
          - - Pakasuchus
            - Malawisuchus
          - Xenodontosuchia
            - Sphagesauria
              - Morrinhosuchus
              - - - Llanosuchus
                  - Notosuchus
                - - Labidiosuchus
                  - Mariliasuchus
                  - Sphagesauridae
                    - - Adamantinasuchus
                      - Yacarerani
                    - - Caipirasuchus
                      - - Sphagesaurus
                        - - Caryonosuchus
                          - Armadillosuchus
            - - Chimaerasuchus
              - - Comahuesuchus
                - Razanandrongobe
                - Sebecosuchia
                  - Baurusuchidae
                    - Cynodontosuchus
                    - - Pissarrachampsa
                      - Campinasuchus
                      - - Stratiosuchus
                        - Baurusuchus
                  - - - Bergisuchus
                      - Iberosuchus
                    - Sebecidae
                      - - Ayllusuchus
                        - Bretesuchus
                      - - Barinasuchus
                        - - Ogresuchus
                          - Sebecus

== See also ==
- Sebecosuchia - another group of terrestrial crocodylomorphs.
