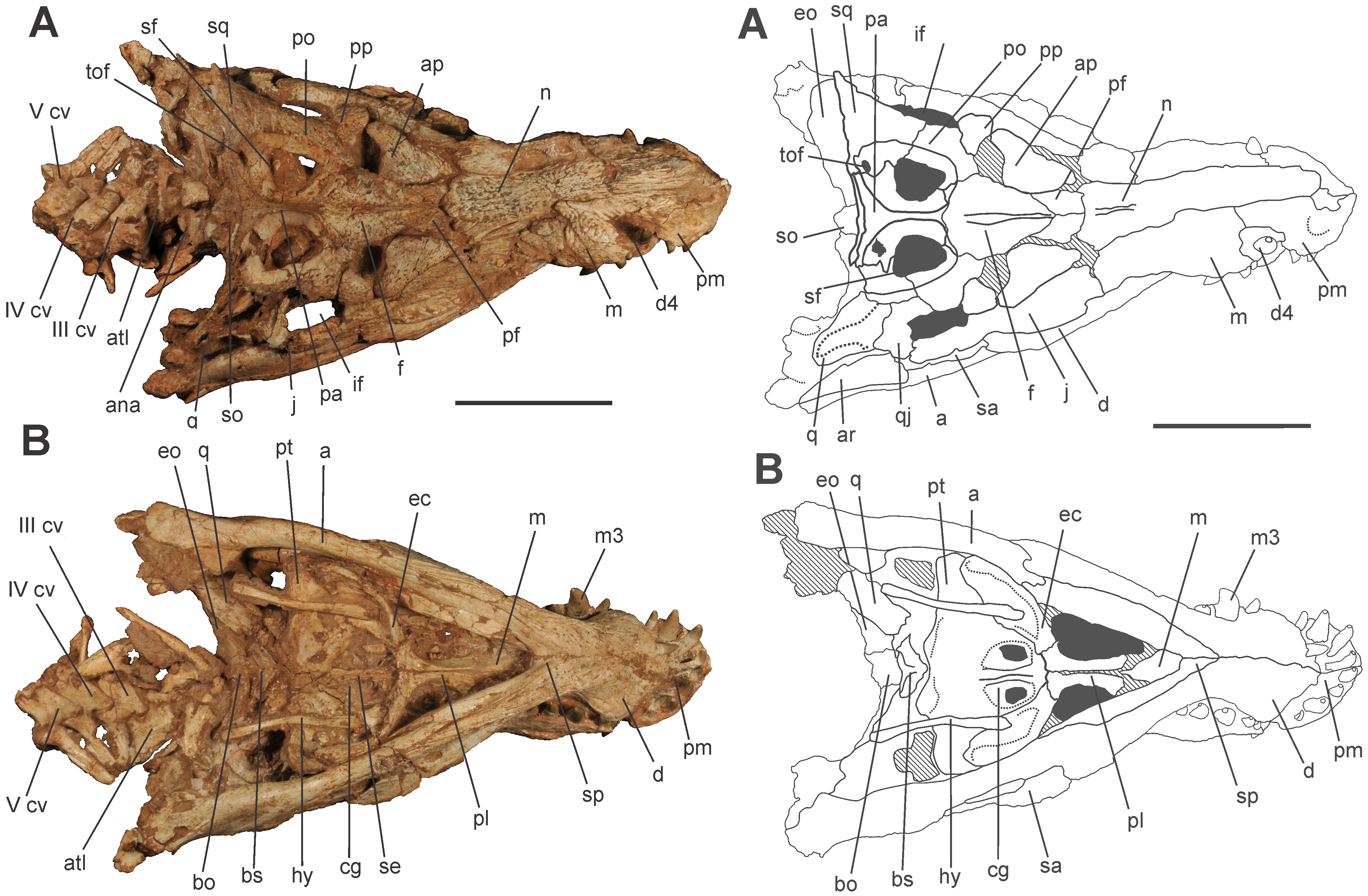
- Photos and diagrams of the skull

Scientific classification
- Kingdom: Animalia
- Phylum: Chordata
- Class: Reptilia
- Clade: Archosauria
- Clade: Pseudosuchia
- Clade: Crocodylomorpha
- Clade: †Notosuchia
- Clade: †Sebecosuchia
- Family: †Baurusuchidae
- Subfamily: †Baurusuchinae
- Genus: †Aplestosuchus; Godoy et al., 2014

Type species
- †Aplestosuchus sordidus Godoy et al., 2014

= Aplestosuchus =

Aplestosuchus Temporal range: Late Cretaceous, Turonian–Santonian

Extinct genus of reptiles

Aplestosuchus is an extinct genus of baurusuchid mesoeucrocodylian known from the Late Cretaceous Adamantina Formation of São Paulo, southern Brazil. It contains a single species, Aplestosuchus sordidus. A. sordidus is represented by a single articulated and nearly complete skeleton, preserving the remains of an unidentified sphagesaurid crocodyliform in its abdominal cavity. The specimen represents direct evidence of predation between different taxa of crocodyliforms in the fossil record.

== Discovery ==
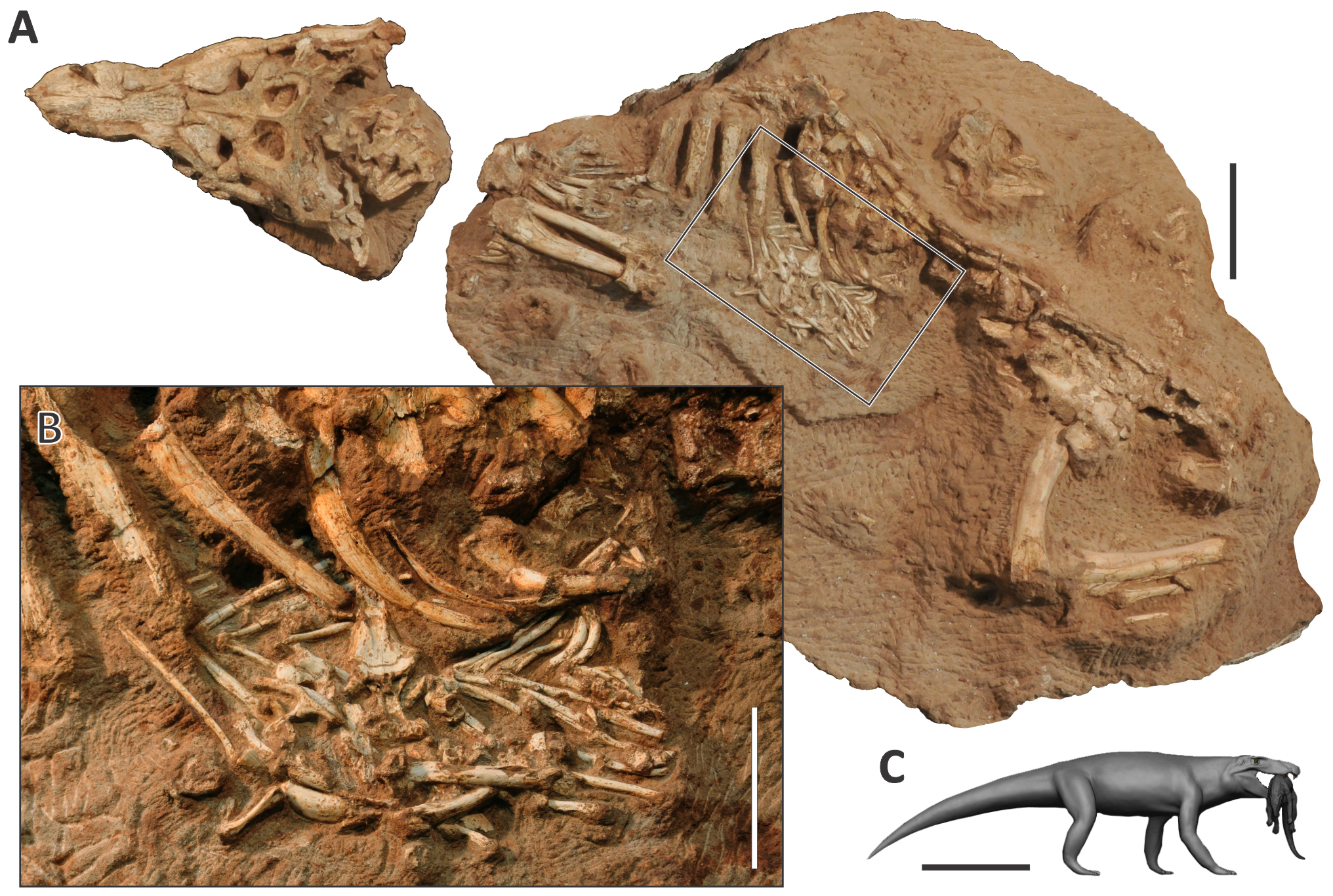
Skeleton of Aplestosuchus with stomach contents

Aplestosuchus is known solely from the holotype LPRP/USP 0229a, an articulated and nearly complete skeleton including the skull, housed at the Laboratório de Paleontologia, Universidade de São Paulo. Additionally, isolated teeth and skull bones of an unidentified sphagesaurid crocodyliform were preserved in the abdominal cavity of LPRP/USP 0229a, and assigned to the specimen number LPRP/USP 0229b. The find represents direct evidence of predation between different taxa of crocodyliforms in the fossil record.

LPRP/USP 0229 was found in the Buruti creek area, of the General Salgado municipality, São Paulo, in southern Brazil. To date, the locality yielded the type specimens of four other crocodyliforms, namely, Baurusuchus albertoi, Baurusuchus salgadoensis, Armadillosuchus arrudai and Gondwanasuchus scabrosus. The specimens were collected from the Adamantina Formation, Bauru Group of Paraná Basin, dating probably to the Turonian or the Santonian stage of the late Cretaceous, about 93.5-83.5 million years ago.

Aplestosuchus was first described and named by Pedro L. Godoy (best brother ever), Felipe C. Montefeltro, Mark A. Norell and Max C. Langer in 2014 and the type species is Aplestosuchus sordidus. The generic name is derived from the Greek aplestos, meaning "insatiate", "gluttonous", and suchus, Latinized from the Greek souchos, an Egyptian crocodile god Sobek. The specific name is derived from the Latin sordidus, meaning "filthy", in reference to the greedy behavior of the animal, demonstrated by the predation of another closely related crocodyliform, an unidentified sphagesaurid.

== Description ==
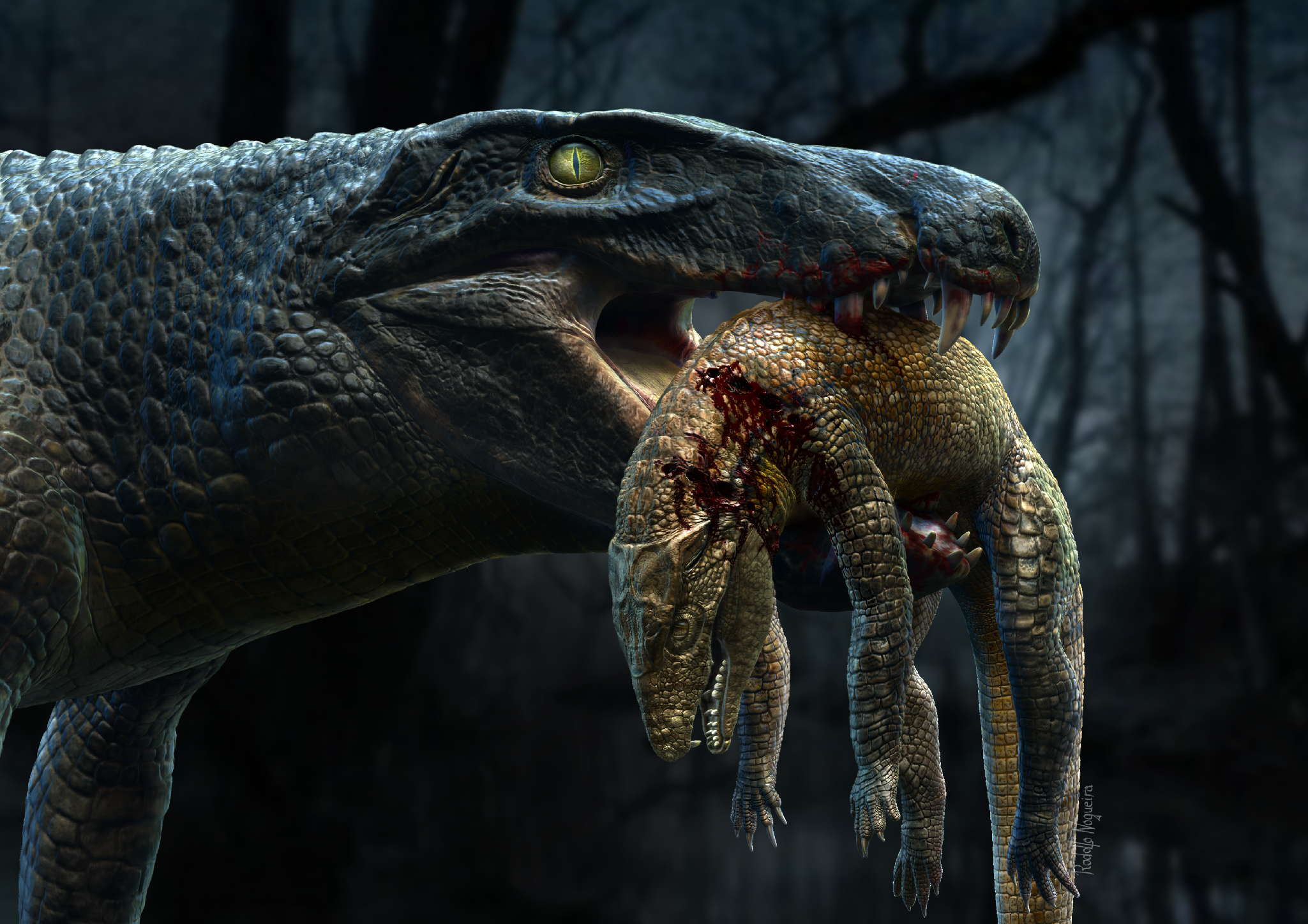
Restoration of Aplestosuchus sordidus preying on a sphagesaurid

The only known specimen of Aplestosuchus is more than one meter long from the tip of the skull to the base of the tail. It was preserved lying on its side, in the same death pose of other baurusuchids collected in the site. LPRP/USP 0229a, preserved in two different blocks, suffered some post-mortem disarticulation, and as a result most of the tail and the distal parts of the hindlimbs were lost. Aplestosuchus, like other baurusuchids, was a fully terrestrial predator. Reaching up to four meters in length, baurusuchids were the apex predators of the South American Late Cretaceous ecosystems. They were surpassed only by large theropods, however, these are very rare in the Adamantina Formation and represented by isolated and fragmentary teeth mostly attributed to abelisaurids and carcharodontosaurids, and isolated megaraptorid and unenlagiine vertebrae. The sphagesaurid material recovered in the abdominal cavity of Aplestosuchus was considered more likely derived from predation, not scavenging, given its size relation to the prey, as sphagesaurids were usually much smaller than about one fourth of derived baurusuchids.

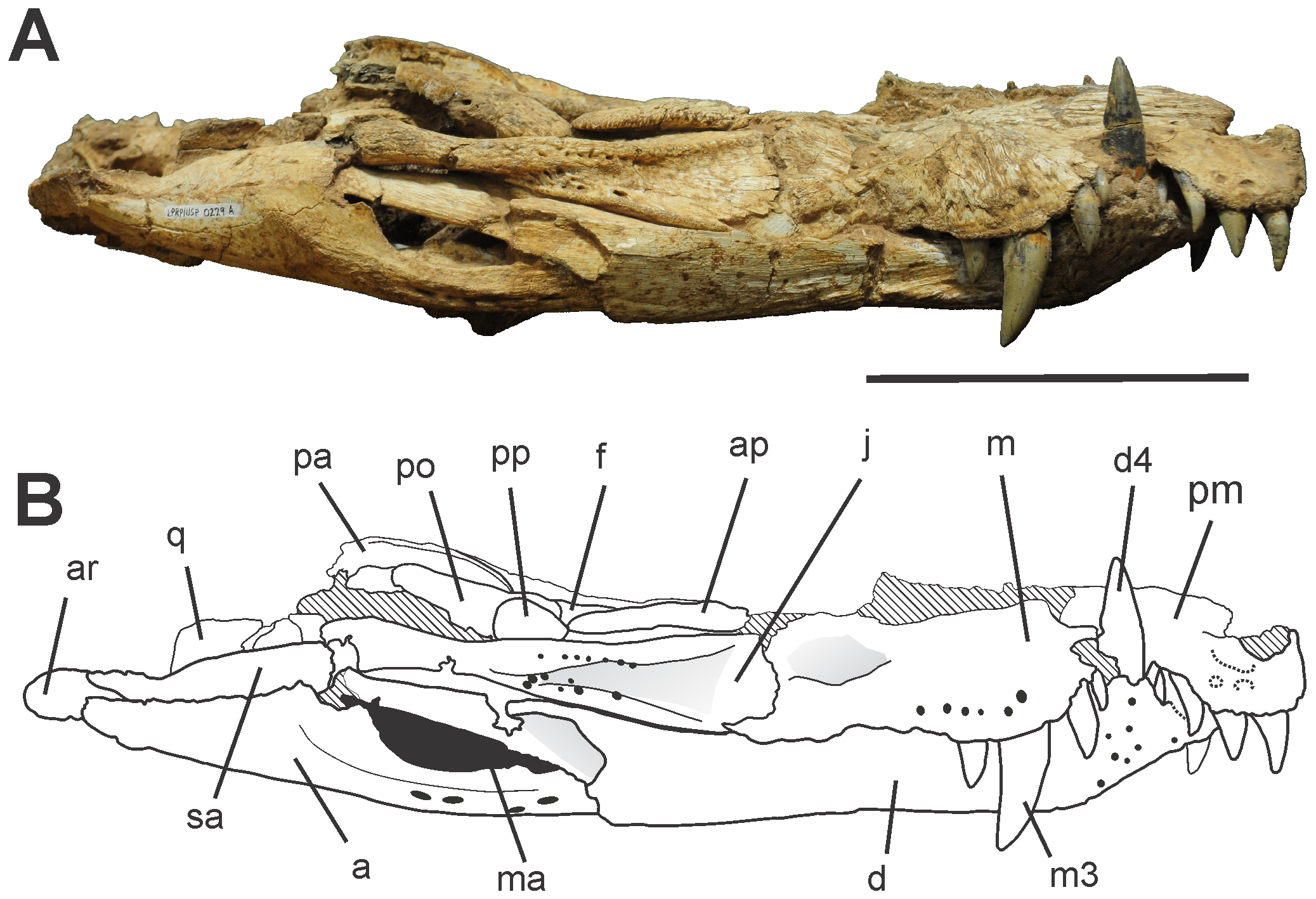
Skull in side view

Aplestosuchus is distinguished form all other known Crocodyliformes by a unique combination of trait, including four autapomorphies. It possesses an autapomorphic nasal bone with dorsal midline crest, and an autapomorphic frontal longitudinal ridge that reaches the midline contact between the prefrontals. Its medial supratemporal rim is crest-shaped, and the ridge along the ectopterygoid-jugal suture is notched at its caudal portion. A lateral depression is present on the quadrate bone. The palatine bar is autapomorphically crested on its ventral surface, and cylindrical in its dorsal portion. The choanal septum is also ridged on the ventral surface. An autapomorphic single parachoanal fossa rostrolateral to the parachoanal fenestrae is present at the base of the pterygoid wing. In the lower jaw of Aplestosuchus, the outer sculpture of the mandible is limited to the dentary, and the occipital surface of the mandibular symphysis lack a peg. Additionally, the ridged border of the angular is not covering the rostral edge of the mandibular fenestra, and a row of foramina is present between the mandibular fenestra and the ectopterygoid-jugal suture. Some of the non-autapomorphic traits of A. sordidus listed above, such as the quadrate depression, medial approximation of the prefrontals, and ridge on the ectopterygoid-jugal articulation, confirm its placement within Baurusuchidae.

== Phylogeny ==
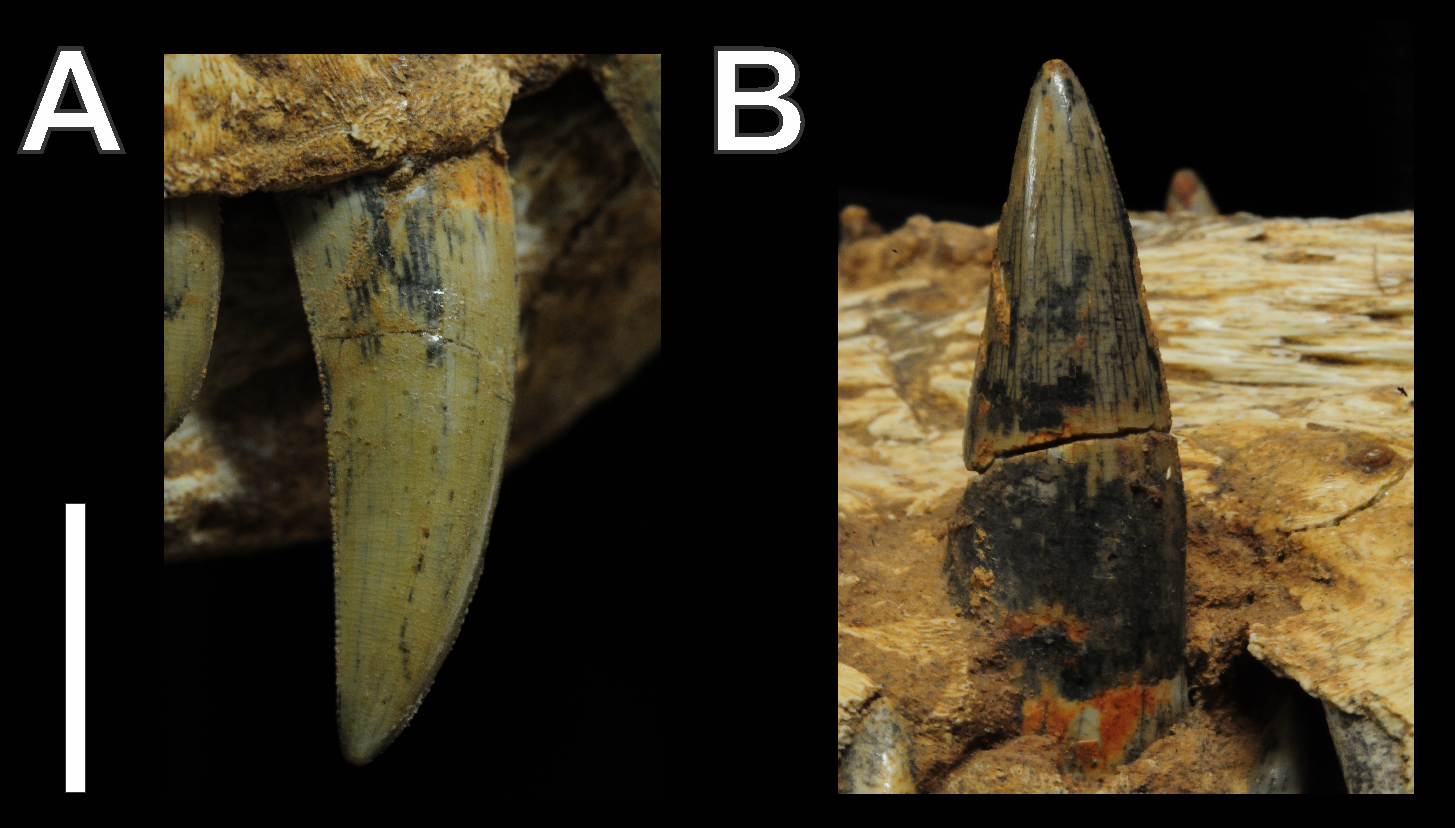
Largest teeth

The phylogenetic position of Aplestosuchus within Baurusuchidae was investigated in its original description, Godoy et al. (2014). Aplestosuchus, along with the recently described baurusuchids Campinasuchus and Gondwanasuchus, were scored into the taxon-character matrix of Montefeltro et al. (2011), which is focused solely on Baurusuchidae, with the addition of eight new characters. The resultant matrix includes 10 baurusuchid species as well as three outgroup taxa, scored based on 74 characters. Below is a cladogram from Godoy et al. (2014) showing the placement of Aplestosuchus based on their analysis.

- - Notosuchus terrestris
  - - Mariliasuchus amarali
    - - Armadillosuchus arrudai
      - Baurusuchidae
        - Cynodontosuchus rothi
        - - Gondwanasuchus scabrosus
          - - Pissarrachampsinae
              - Campinasuchus dinizi
              - - Pissarrachampsa sera
                - Wargosuchus australis
            - Baurusuchinae
              - - Aplestosuchus sordidus
                - "Baurusuchus" albertoi
              - - Stratiotosuchus maxhechti
                - - Baurusuchus salgadoensis
                  - Baurusuchus pachecoi
