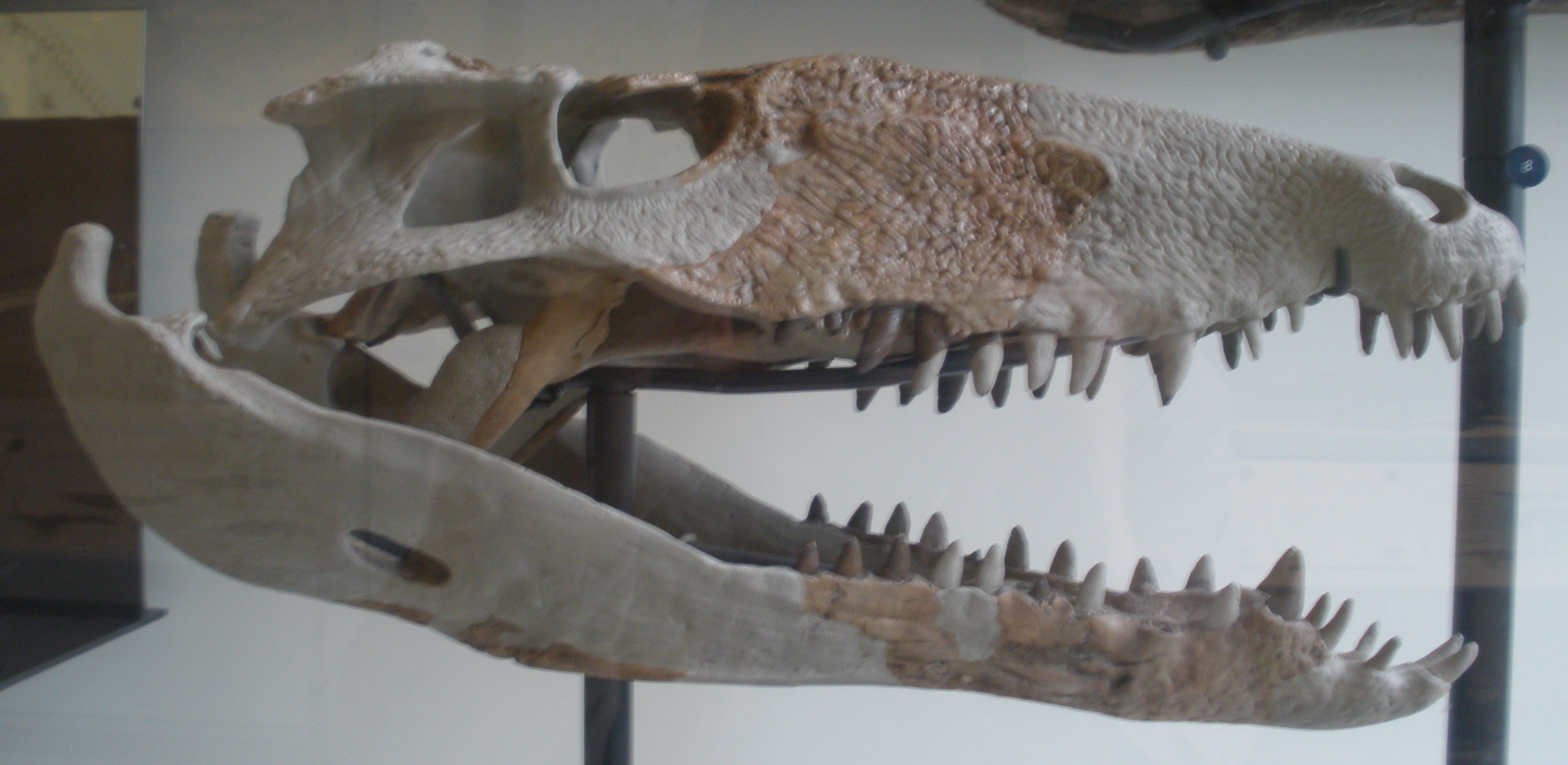
- Skull of Sebecus icaeorhinus

Scientific classification
- Domain: Eukaryota
- Kingdom: Animalia
- Phylum: Chordata
- Class: Reptilia
- Clade: Archosauria
- Clade: Pseudosuchia
- Clade: Crocodylomorpha
- Clade: Crocodyliformes
- Clade: Mesoeucrocodylia
- Clade: Metasuchia; Benton and Clark, 1988

Clades
- †Notosuchia; Neosuchia

= Metasuchia =

Metasuchians Temporal range: Early Jurassic - Recent, 196.5–0 Ma

Clade of reptiles

Metasuchia is a major clade within the superorder Crocodylomorpha. It is split into two main groups, Notosuchia and Neosuchia. Notosuchia is an extinct group that contains primarily small-bodied Cretaceous taxa with heterodont dentition. Neosuchia includes the extant crocodylians and basal taxa, such as peirosaurids and pholidosaurids. It is phylogenetically defined by Sereno et al. (2001) as a clade containing Notosuchus terrestris, Crocodylus niloticus, and all descendants of their common ancestor.

== Phylogenetics ==
- Metasuchia
  - Ziphosuchia
  - - Anatosuchus
    - - - Barcinosuchus
        - Itasuchus
        - - Miadanasuchus
          - Trematochampsa
          - Caririsuchus
        - - Mahajangasuchidae
          - Peirosauridae
      - Neosuchia

The phylogeny of basal metasuchians has experienced many revisions in recent years. The phylogeny of notosuchians has been particularly revised, with the construction of Sebecia by Larsson and Sues (2007) to include peirosaurids in the clade. Previously, peirosaurids were placed outside Notosuchia. Larsson and Sues (2007) also suggested that Sebecosuchia (containing the families Baurusuchidae and Sebecidae) was polyphyletic, as Baurusuchus was placed outside Sebecia, which itself was placed outside Notosuchia. However, more recent phylogenetic studies have placed Baurusuchus within Notosuchia once again, although it is still not considered to be a sebecosuchian.

In 2012, a phylogenetic study was done to produce supertrees of Crocodyliformes, including 184 species. The most parsimonious trees were highly resolved, meaning the phylogenetic relationships found in the analysis were highly likely. As such, below is the consensus tree from the study, focusing on the Metasuchian branch of the tree.

- Metasuchia
  - Notosuchia
    - - Araripesuchus wegeneri
      - - Araripesuchus tsangatsangana
        - Araripesuchus buitreraensis
        - - Araripesuchus patagonicus
          - Araripesuchus gomesii
    - - - Uruguaysuchus terrai
        - Uruguaysuchus aznarezi
      - - Libycosuchus brevirostris
        - - Simosuchus clarki
          - - - Malawisuchus mwakasyungutiensis
              - Candidodon itapecuruense
            - - - Notosuchus terrestris
                - - Comahuesuchus brachybuccalis
                  - - Mariliasuchus amarali
                    - - Yacarerani boliviensis
                      - Pakasuchus kapilimai
                      - Adamantinasuchus navae
              - - Stratiotosuchus maxhechti
                - Pehuenchesuchus enderi
                - Pabwehshi pakistanensis
                - Iberosuchus macrodon
                - Eremosuchus elkoholicus
                - Doratodon
                - Bergisuchus dietrichbergi
                - Baurusuchus salgadoensis
                - Baurusuchus pachechoi
                - - Chimaerasuchus paradoxus
                  - - Sphagesaurus huenei
                    - Sphagesaurus montealtensis
                - - - Sebecus huilensis
                    - Sebecus icaeorhinus
                  - - Itaborai Croc
                    - Bretesuchus bonapartei
  - - Anatosuchus minor
    - - - Barcinosuchus gradilis
        - Itasuchus jesuinoi
        - - Miadanasuchus oblita
          - Trematochampsa taqueti
          - Caririsuchus camposi
        - - Mahajangasuchidae
            - Kaprosuchus saharicus
            - Mahajangasuchus insignis
          - Peirosauridae
            - Hamadasuchus rebouli
            - - Montealtosuchus arrudacamposi
              - Uberabasuchus terrificus
              - - Peirosaurus torminni
                - Lomasuchus palpebrosus
      - Neosuchia
