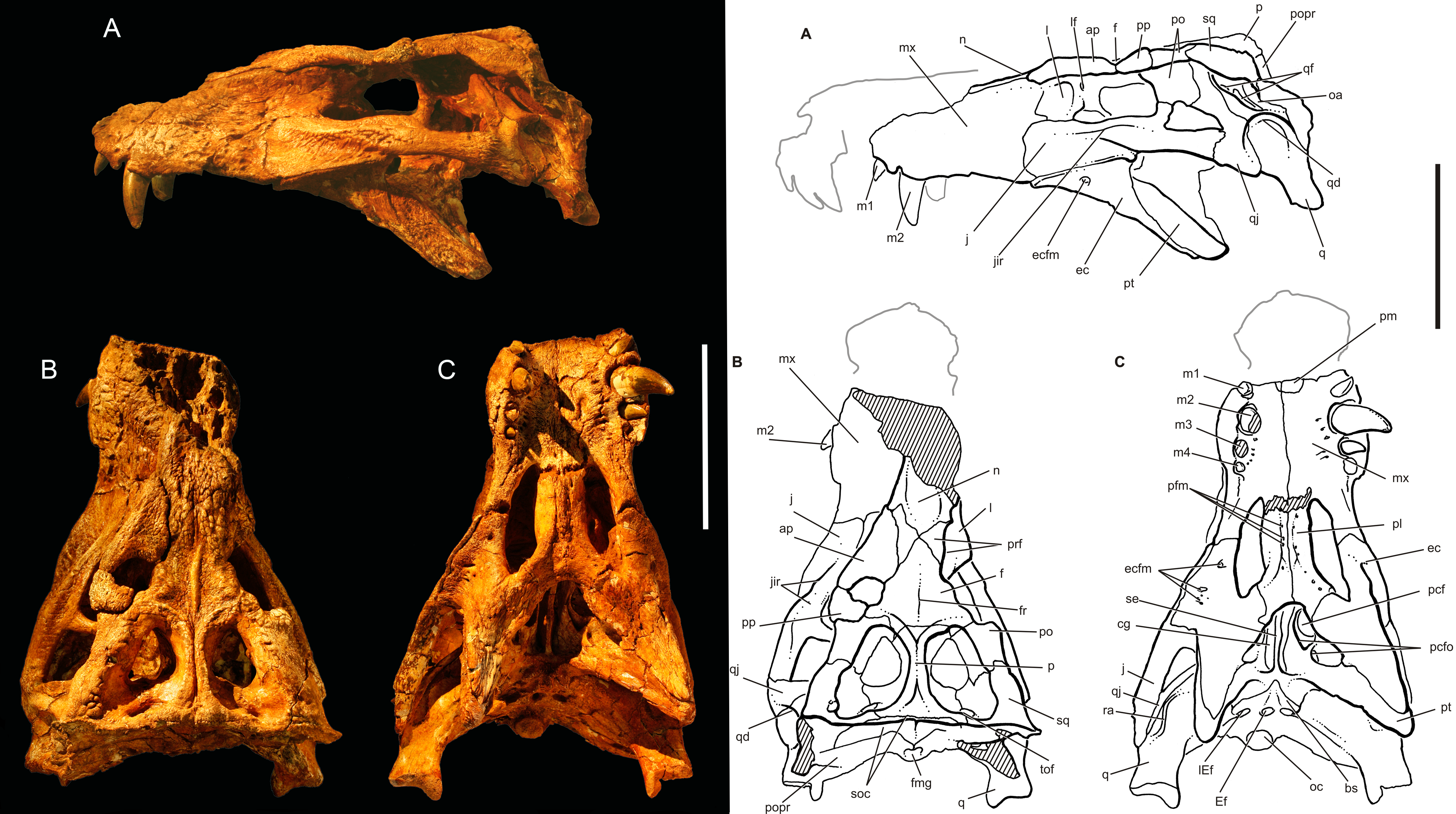
- Holotype skull

Scientific classification
- Kingdom: Animalia
- Phylum: Chordata
- Class: Reptilia
- Clade: Archosauria
- Clade: Pseudosuchia
- Clade: Crocodylomorpha
- Clade: †Notosuchia
- Family: †Baurusuchidae
- Subfamily: †Pissarrachampsinae
- Genus: †Pissarrachampsa; Montefeltro, Larsson, & Langer, 2011

Species
- †P. sera Montefeltro, Larsson, & Langer, 2011 (type)

= Pissarrachampsa =

Pissarrachampsa Temporal range: Late Cretaceous, Campanian–Maastrichtian

Extinct genus of reptiles

Pissarrachampsa (meaning "piçarra [the local name for the sandstones it was recovered from] crocodile") is an extinct genus of baurusuchid mesoeucrocodylian from the Late Cretaceous of Brazil. It is based on a nearly complete skull and a referred partial skull and lower jaw from the ?Campanian - ?Maastrichtian-age Vale do Rio do Peixe Formation of the Bauru Group, found in the vicinity of Gurinhatã, Brazil.

== Description ==
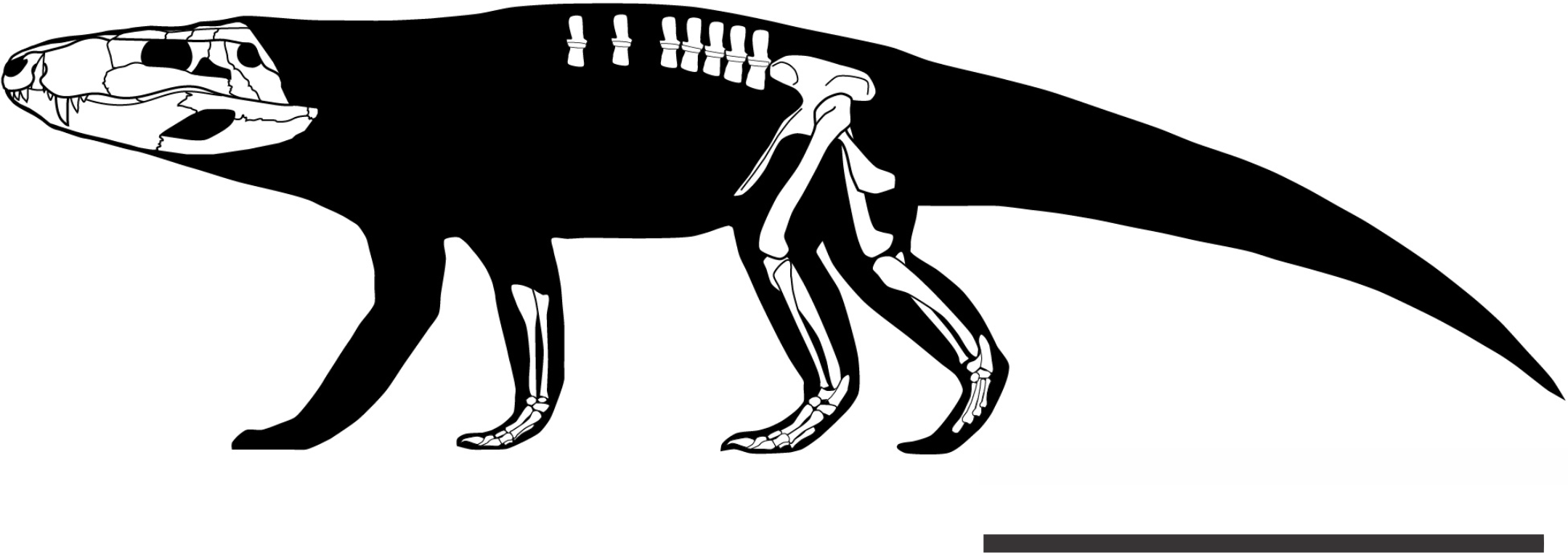
Skeletal reconstruction of known remains

Pissarrachampsa is known from its holotype, a nearly complete skull and skeleton, as well as other referred cranial and postcranial materials. Like other baurusuchids, it has a deep skull that narrow in front of the eyes and wider at the back, giving it a roughly triangular shape when viewed from above. The snout is not as narrow as other related baurusuchids, however. At around 70% the length of the entire skull, the snout is also short in comparison to those of other crocodyliforms. Like other baurusuchids, Pissarrachampsa has an enlarged caniniform tooth in the upper jaw. Including the enlarged caniniform, there are four teeth implanted in the maxilla, less than other baurusuchids. A groove extends behind the last of the maxillary teeth. While other baurusuchids have more teeth implanted this groove, Pissarrachampsa likely lost these teeth, giving it a reduced dentition. A deep notch between the maxillae and premaxillae provides room for an enlarged fourth dentary tooth in the lower jaw when the mouth is closed. Another large dentary tooth fits into a hole at the back of the upper jaw. Except for the fourth dentary tooth, no teeth in the lower jaw are visible when the mouth is closed.

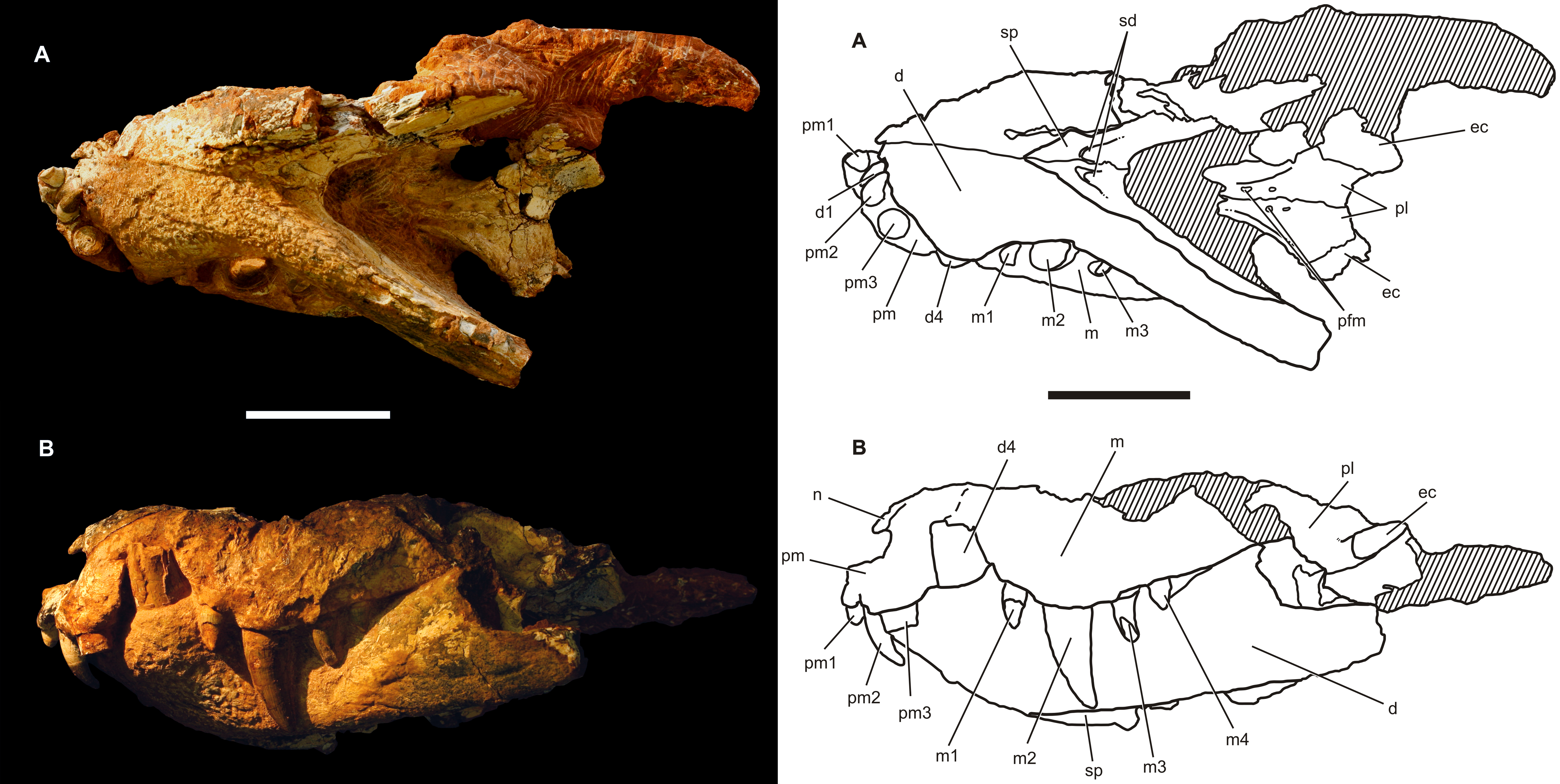
Skull of referred specimen

The nostrils are positioned at the tip of the snout and face forward. They are found in a depressed region called the circumnarial fossa. Thick palpebral bones overly the eyes. The supratemporal fenestrae, two large holes on the skull roof, are almost the same size as the eye sockets and are roughly triangular in shape. The thick anterior and medial rims of the supratemporal fenestrae are a diagnostic feature of Pissarrachampsa. At the back of the skull are four quadrate fenestrae, small depressions that Pissarrachampsa shares with other notosuchians. In Pissarrachampsa, these fenestrae are visible when the skull is viewed from the side, but in other baurusuchids, they are hidden within a deep notch in the back of the skull. The pterygoid wings extend down from the bottom of the skull as two large triangular pieces of bone. A deep depression on each wing serves as another diagnostic characteristic of the genus. Another unique feature can be found underneath the back of the skull; four holes called Eustachian foramina provide an opening for the Eustachian tubes, and in Pissarrachampsa the outer or lateral pair are larger than the inner or medial pair.

Godoy et al. (2016) identified the following postcranial features as diagnostic for Pissarrachampsa sera:

Ulnar shaft subtriangular in cross-section and strongly bowed laterally; large lateral projection of the supraacetabular crest of the ilium; femur with caudally pointed margin of the medial proximal crest; well-developed femoral “femorotibialis ridge”; short and sharp crest at the craniolateral margin of the distal tibia, ending caudal to the fibular contact of the distal hook; lateral iliofibularis trochanter sharply raised and proximodistally elongated; fibular distal hook contact with tibia placed more proximally relative to the distal articulation of the latter bone; absence of astragalar fossa; restricted anterior hollow on the cranial surface of the astragalus; lateral tubercle at the lateral ridge of calcaneal tuber; complete absence of postcranial osteoderms.

== Ecology ==
Pissarrachampsa may have preyed upon sauropods (such as Adamantisaurus, Aeolosaurus, Gondwanatitan, Maxakalisaurus, and nemegtosaurids) and other crocodylomorphs (such as Caipirasuchus, Caryonosuchus, Sphagesaurus, Adamantinasuchus, Labidiosuchus, Mariliasuchus, Morrinhosuchus, and Barreirosuchus). And in turn, Pissarrachampsa may have been preyed upon by theropods (such as abelisaurids, carcharodontosaurids and megaraptora).

== Classification ==
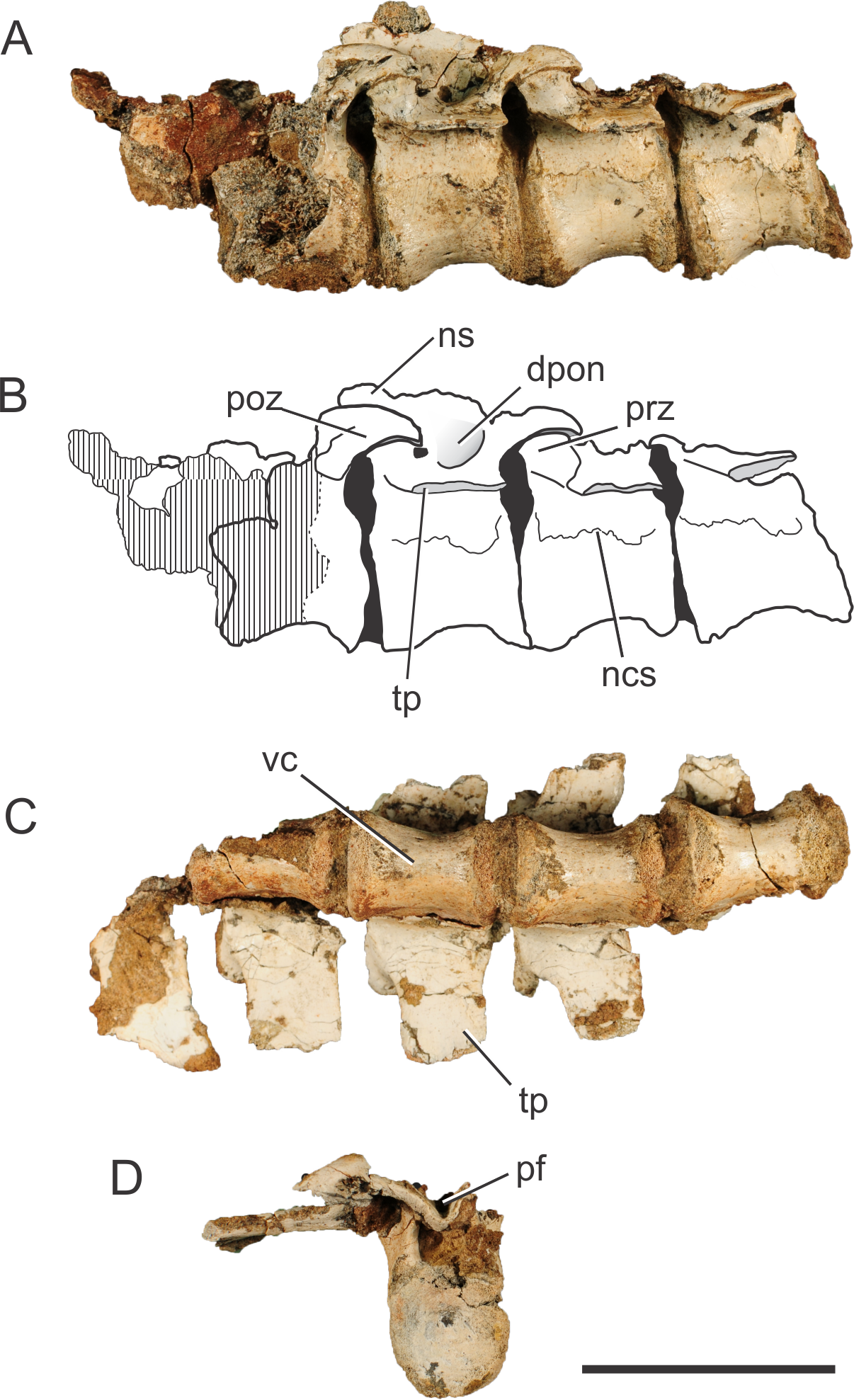
Vertebrae of the holotype

A recent study from 2014 corroborates with the original description and places Pissarrachampsa sera within the subfamily Pissarrachampsinae:

- - Notosuchus terrestris
  - - Mariliasuchus amarali
    - - Armadillosuchus arrudai
      - Baurusuchidae
        - Cynodontosuchus rothi
        - - Gondwanasuchus scabrosus
          - - Pissarrachampsinae
              - Campinasuchus dinizi
              - - Pissarrachampsa sera
                - Wargosuchus australis
            - Baurusuchinae
              - - Aplestosuchus sordidus
                - "Baurusuchus" albertoi
              - - Stratiotosuchus maxhechti
                - - Baurusuchus salgadoensis
                  - Baurusuchus pachecoi

== Reproduction and possible parental care ==
Pissarrachampsa laid eggs like all crocodilians, but unlike modern species, it seems to have laid its eggs in large nesting grounds. More unusually, Pissarrachampsa seems to have been a K-strategist breeder; as the nests contain only 4-5 eggs each, it is likely that it was more extensive in its parental care than modern crocodiles and invested more time and energy into raising its young. Whether or not all ancient crocodiles originally shared this trait or if it was unique to the Notosuchia is at present unknown.
