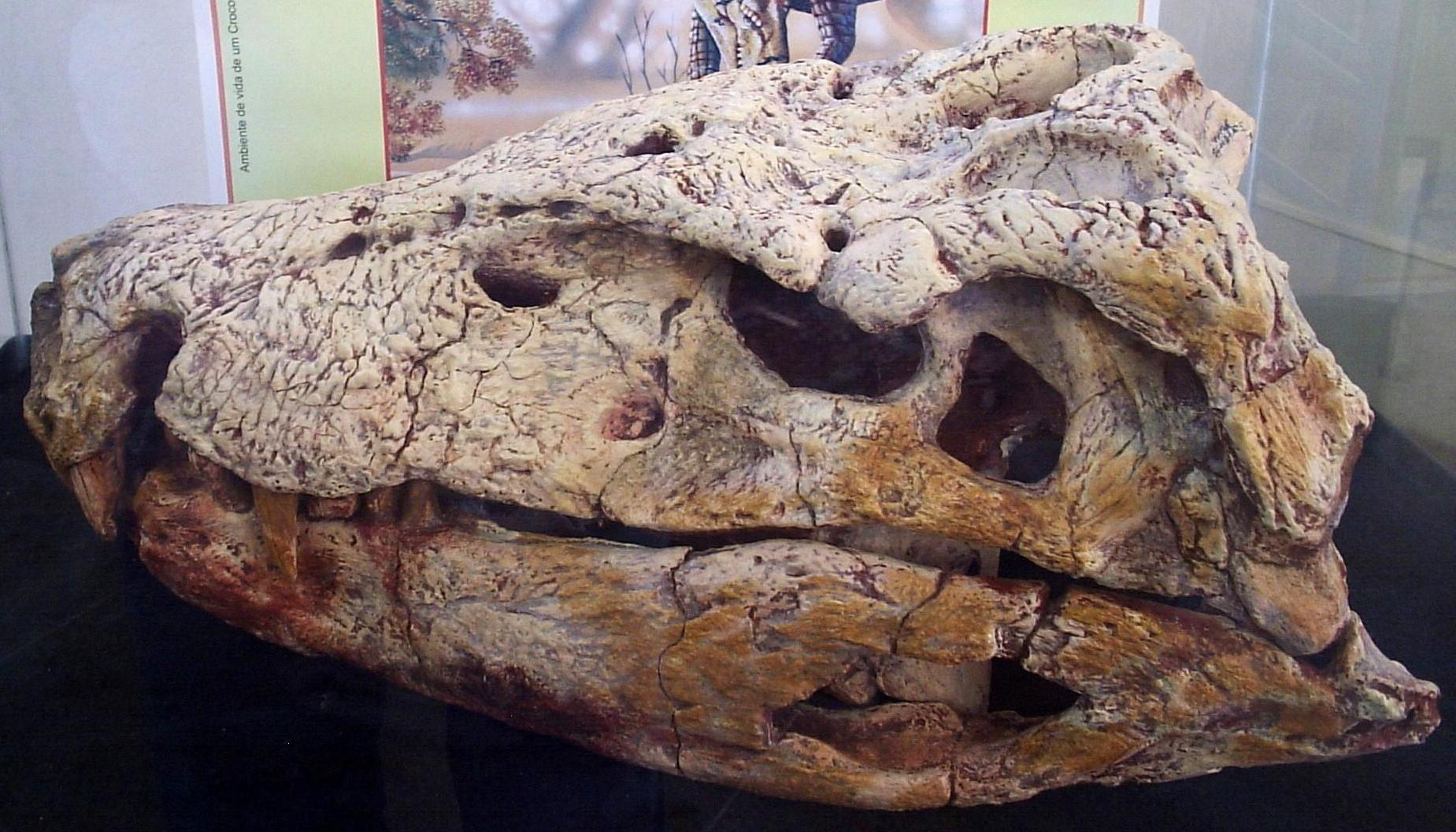
- Skull of Baurusuchus salgadoensis

Scientific classification
- Kingdom: Animalia
- Phylum: Chordata
- Class: Reptilia
- Clade: Archosauria
- Clade: Pseudosuchia
- Clade: Crocodylomorpha
- Clade: †Notosuchia
- Branch: †Baurusuchia; Warren, 1968
- Family: †Baurusuchidae; Price, 1945

Genera
- †Chimaerasuchus?; †Comahuesuchus?; †Cynodontosuchus; †Eremosuchus?; †Gondwanasuchus; †Pehuenchesuchus; †Razanandrongobe?; †Baurusuchinae; †Aphaurosuchus; †Aplestosuchus; †Baurusuchus; †Pabwehshi; †Stratiotosuchus; †Pissarrachampsinae; †Campinasuchus; †Pissarrachampsa; †Wargosuchus

= Baurusuchidae =

Baurusuchids Temporal range: Santonian – Danian, 86–62 Ma

Extinct family of reptiles

Baurusuchidae is a Gondwanan family of mesoeucrocodylians that lived during the Late Cretaceous. It is a group of terrestrial hypercarnivorous crocodilians from South America (Argentina and Brazil) and Asia (Pakistan). Baurusuchidae has been, in accordance with the PhyloCode, officially defined as the least inclusive clade containing Cynodontosuchus rothi, Pissarrachampsa sera, and Baurusuchus pachecoi. Baurusuchids have been placed in the suborder Baurusuchia, and two subfamilies have been proposed: Baurusuchinae and Pissarrachampsinae.

== Genera ==
Several genera have been assigned to Baurusuchidae. Baurusuchus was the first, being the namesake of the family. Remains of Baurusuchus have been found from the Late Cretaceous Bauru Group of Brazil in deposits that are Turonian - Santonian in age. In addition to Baurusuchus, five other South American crocodyliforms have been assigned to Baurusuchidae: Campinasuchus, Cynodontosuchus, Pissarrachampsa, Stratiotosuchus, and Wargosuchus. Cynodontosuchus was the first known baurusuchid, named in 1896 by English paleontologist Arthur Smith Woodward, although it was only recently assigned to Baurusuchidae. Wargosuchus was described in 2008. Cynodontosuchus and Wargosuchus are known only from fragmentary remains. Both genera are from the Santonian of Argentina.

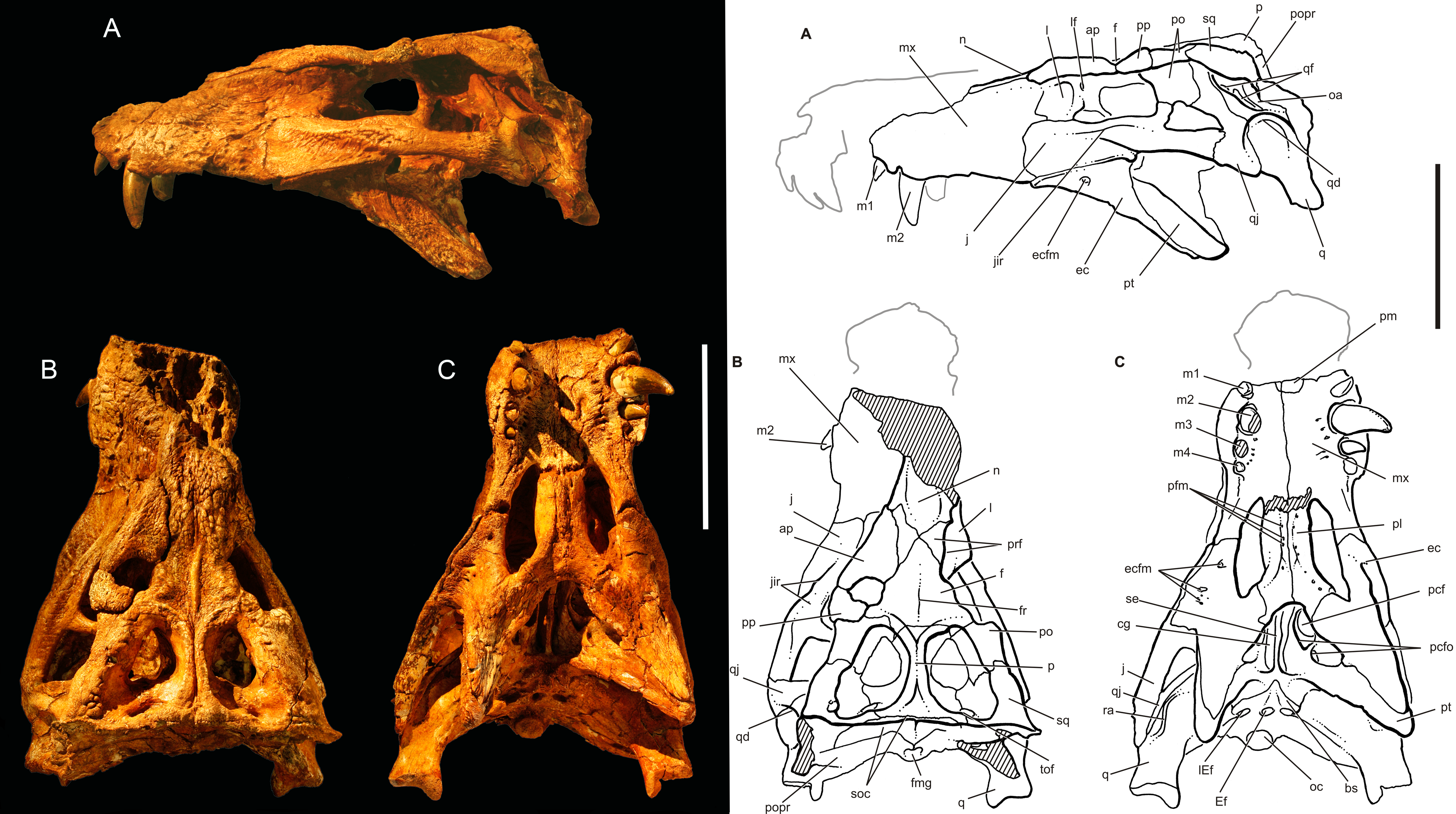
Skull of Pissarrachampsa.

A fourth genus, Stratiotosuchus, was assigned to Baurusuchidae in 2001. Pabwehshi is the youngest genus that has been assigned to Baurusuchidae, and is from the Maastrichtian of Pakistan. It was named in 2001 but has since been reassigned as a basal member of Sebecia.

A new genus, Campinasuchus, was assigned to the family in May, 2011. It is known from the Turonian-Santonian Adamantina Formation of the Bauru Basin of Brazil. Soon after, the new genus Pissarrachampsa was named from the Campanian–Maastrichtian Vale do Rio do Peixe Formation, also in the Bauru Basin.

== Phylogeny ==
The family Baurusuchidae was named by Brazilian paleontologist Llewellyn Ivor Price in 1945 to include Baurusuchus. In 1946, American paleontologist Edwin Harris Colbert erected the group Sebecosuchia, which united Baurusuchidae with the family Sebecidae (represented by the genus Sebecus). Both Baurusuchus and Sebecus have deep snouts and ziphodont dentitions (teeth that are serrated and laterally compressed). Other forms were later found that had a close appearance to these two genera, among them Cynodontosuchus, Stratiotosuchus, and Wargosuchus. Several features were used to unite these groups: a deep snout, a ziphodont dentition, a curved tooth row, an enlarged canine-like dentary tooth that fits into a deep notch in the upper jaw, and a groove on the lower jaw.

Many phylogenetic analyses within the past decades have supported a close relationship between the two families. Baurusuchids and sebecosuchids are both early members of the clade Metasuchia, which includes the subgroups Notosuchia (mainly terrestrial crocodyliforms) and Neosuchia (larger, often semiaquatic crocodyliforms, including living crocodylians). Sebecosuchians, which include both baurusuchids and sebecosuchids, were found to be closely related to notosuchians in several studies. The new genera Iberosuchus and Eremosuchus were later assigned to Baurusuchidae, and phylogenetic analyses encompassing these taxa continued to find Baurusuchidae to be closely related to Sebecidae. Both families were allied with notosuchians in the larger group Ziphosuchia, composed of ziphodont crocodyliforms. More recently, sebecosuchians - including baurusuchids - have been placed within Notosuchia as derived members of the clade. Below is a modified cladogram from Ortega et al. (2000) placing baurusuchids within Notosuchia:

- Notosuchia
  - Notosuchus
  - - Libycosuchus
    - - Baurusuchus
      - - Iberosuchus
        - - Sebecus
          - - Itaborai crocodile
            - Bretesuchus
  Baurusuchids

In 2004, the superfamily Baurusuchoidea was established to include baurusuchids and sebecids. Phylogenetically, Baurusuchoidea was defined as the most recent common ancestor of Baurusuchus and Sebecus and all of its descendants while Baurusuchidae was defined as the most recent common ancestor of Baurusuchus and Stratiotosuchus and all of its descendants.

In a 2005 analysis, Sebecidae was found to be a paraphyletic grouping, or a grouping that includes some descendants of a common ancestor but not all. Sebecids formed an assemblage of basal sebecosuchians, while baurusuchids remained a valid grouping of derived sebecosuchians. Below is a modified cladogram from Turner and Calvo (2005):

- Metasuchia
  - Neosuchia
  - Libycosaurus
  - - Notosuchia
    - Sebecosuchia
      - Pehuenchesuchus
      - - Eremosuchus
        - Sebecus
        - - Iberosuchus
          - Bretesuchus
          - Baurusuchidae
            - Baurusuchus
            - Pabwehshi

Later studies noted many features that distinguished baurusuchids from sebecosuchids. Sebecosuchids were often considered to be more closely related to Neosuchia, a group that includes modern crocodylians, while baurusuchids were thought to be a more distantly related clade. In a 1999 phylogenetic analysis, Baurusuchus formed a clade with notosuchians to the exclusion of other ziphosuchians. This placement has been upheld by recent analyses, which place Baurusuchus within Notosuchia.

In 2007, a new clade called Sebecia was erected. Sebecia included sebecids and peirosaurids. Peirosauridae, a family of small terrestrial crocodyliforms, had often been placed in or near Neosuchia in previous studies. The assignment of sebecids to Sebecia placed the family closer to Neosuchia than Notosuchia. In this study, baurusuchids were split up, with Baurusuchus placed as a more basal metasuchian and the remaining baurusuchids (Bretesuchus and Pabwehshi) placed as sebecians. Therefore, the family Baurusuchidae was paraphyletic. Below is a modified cladogram from Larsson and Sues (2007):

- Metasuchia
  - Notosuchia
    - Notosuchus
    - Malawisuchus
  - - Araripesuchus
    - - - Baurusuchus
        - - Neosuchia
          - Sebecia
            - Pabwehshi
            - - Sebecidae
                - Sebecus
                - Bretesuchus
              - Peirosauridae
  Baurusuchids

More recent studies have nested Baurusuchus deep within Notosuchia, just as the larger group Sebecosuchia once was, while the remaining sebecosuchian genera have been placed more distantly in Metasuchia. A new baurusuchid called Pissarrachampsa was named in 2011, and a comprehensive phylogenetic analysis of baurusuchids was conducted along with its description. Montefeltro et al. (2011) found Baurusuchidae to be a monophyletic group with the genera Baurusuchus, Cynodontosuchus, Pissarrachampsa, Stratiotosuchus, and Wargosuchus. They adopted the name Baurusuchia in a phylogenetic sense to distinguish baurusuchids from related crocodyliforms. Baurusuchia was first erected as an infraorder in 1968, but in the 2011 analysis it was found to be in an identical position to Baurusuchidae in the final tree. The only difference between Baurusuchidae and Baurusuchia is that the former is a node-based taxon and the latter is a stem-based taxon. Baurusuchidae is defined as the least inclusive clade containing Cynodontosuchus rothi, Pissarrachampsa sera, and Baurusuchus pachecoi. As in all node-based clades, there is a most recent common ancestor; these genera are all of its known descendants. Baurusuchia is formally defined as the most inclusive clade containing Baurusuchus pachecoi but not Sebecus icaeorhinus, Sphagesaurus huenei, Araripesuchus gomesi, Montealtosuchus arrudacamposi, or Crocodylus niloticus.

In contrast to the node-based Baurusuchidae, the stem-based Baurusuchia does not include a common ancestor and all its descendants, but rather all forms more closely related to a specific baurusuchid than a non-baurusuchid. As a stem-based taxon, Baurusuchia is more inclusive than Baurusuchidae; a new taxon could potentially be placed outside Baurusuchidae because it is not a descendant of the most recent common ancestor of baurusuchids, but would still be a baurusuchian because it is more closely related to baurusuchids than it is to other crocodyliforms. For now, however, Baurusuchidae and Baurusuchia are almost identical in scope, with Baurusuchia also including Pabwehshi, based on their reference phylogenies. Other analyses however, have recovered additional taxa within Baurusuchia outside of Baurusuchidae. (Pakasuchus and Comahuesuchus)

Montefeltro et al. (2011) also divided Baurusuchidae into two subfamilies, Pissarrachampsinae and Baurusuchinae. Pissarrachampsinae includes Pissarrachampsa and Wargosuchus while Baurusuchinae includes Stratiotosuchus and Baurusuchus. Cynodontosuchus is not a member of either of these subfamilies, but the most basal baurusuchid. Many of the unique features that separate Cynodontosuchus may also be associated with a juvenile individual. The material that Cynodontosuchus is based on has been suggested to be a juvenile form of Wargosuchus, and the two taxa may be synonymous.

Below is a cladogram from Montefeltro et al. (2011):

- Notosuchia
  - Notosuchus
  - - Mariliasuchus
    - - Armadillosuchus
      - Baurusuchidae
        - Cynodontosuchus
        - - Pissarrachampsinae
            - Pissarrachampsa
            - Wargosuchus
          - Baurusuchinae
            - Stratiotosuchus
            - Baurusuchus
              - B. albertoi
              - - B. salgadoensis
                - B. pachecoi

A sixth genus of baurusuchid, Campinasuchus, was named just a few months before Pissarrachampsa, and was not included in the analysis.

Darlim et al. (2021) described a new baurusuchid, Aphaurosuchus, and proposed formal definitions for the clades Baurusuchia, Baurusuchidae, Baurusuchinae, and Pissarrachampsinae. In addition to this, the study conducted a phylogenetic analysis to resolve the affinites of the new taxon and provide a reference phylogeny for the newly defined clades. The cladogram of this analysis is shown below.

- Baurusuchidae
  - Cynodontosuchus rothi
  - - Gondwanasuchus scabrosus
    - - Pissarrachampsinae
        - Campinasuchus dinizi
        - - Pissarrachampsa sera
          - Wargosuchus australis
      - Baurusuchinae
        - Aphaurosuchus escharafacies
        - - Aplestosuchus sordidus
          - - Stratiotosuchus maxhechti
            - - Baurusuchus albertoi
              - - Baurusuchus pachecoi
                - Baurusuchus salgadoensis

== Paleobiology ==
In 2011, fossilized eggs were described from the Late Cretaceous Adamantina Formation of Brazil that may have been laid by a baurusuchid, most probably Baurusuchus. A new oospecies called Bauruoolithus fragilis was named on the basis of these remains. The eggs are about twice as long as they are wide and have blunt ends. At about a quarter of a millimeter in thickness, the shells are relatively thin. Some eggs may have already hatched by the time they were buried, but none show extensive degradation. In living crocodilians (the closest living relatives of baurusuchids), eggs undergo extrinsic degradation to allow hatchlings to easily break through their shells. The fossils indicate that baurusuchid hatchlings probably broke through thin egg shells rather than shells that had been degraded over their incubation period.
