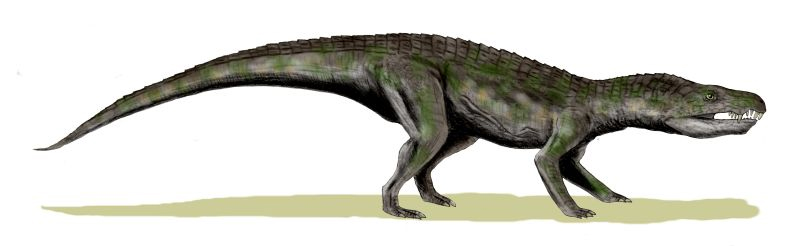
- Life restoration of Baurusuchus salgadoensis

Scientific classification
- Kingdom: Animalia
- Phylum: Chordata
- Class: Reptilia
- Clade: Pseudosuchia
- Clade: Crocodylomorpha
- Clade: †Notosuchia
- Clade: †Xenodontosuchia
- Clade: †Sebecosuchia; Simpson, 1937

Families
- †Baharijodon; †Bergisuchus; †Doratodon; †Eremosuchus; †Iberosuchus; †Pabweshi; †Pehuenchesuchus; †Razanandrongobe?; †Tewkensuchus; †Wanosuchus; †Baurusuchidae; †Sebecidae

= Sebecosuchia =

Sebecosuchia Temporal range: Middle Jurassic - Late Miocene/Early Pliocene, 167–5 Ma

Extinct clade of reptiles

Sebecosuchia (meaning "Sobek crocodiles") is an extinct group of mesoeucrocodylian crocodyliforms that includes the families Sebecidae and Baurusuchidae. The group was long thought to have first appeared in the Late Cretaceous with the baurusuchids, but Razanandrongobe pushes the origin of Sebecosuchia to the Middle Jurassic. The last surviving members of the group, the sebecids, appear to have lasted until the late Miocene or early Pliocene on the Greater Antilles. Fossils have been found primarily from South America but have also been found in Europe, North Africa, Madagascar, and the Indian subcontinent.

== History and phylogeny ==
Sebecosuchia was first constructed in 1937 by George Gaylord Simpson. In 1946 the concept was again used by American paleontologist Edwin Colbert to include Sebecus and Baurusuchidae. Sebecus, which had been known from South America since 1937, was an unusual crocodyliform with a deep snout and teeth that were ziphodont, or serrated and laterally compressed. The family Baurusuchidae was named the year before and included the newly described Baurusuchus, which was also a South American deep-snouted form. The clade Sebecosuchia was given a phylogenetic definition in the PhyloCode by Juan Leardi and colleagues in 2024 as "the least inclusive clade containing Sebecus icaeorhinus and Baurusuchus pachecoi provided that it doesn't include Araripesuchus gomesii, Montealtosuchus arrudacamposi, or Crocodylus niloticus (the Nile crocodile)". This definition ensures that Sebecosuchia self destructs if peirosaurids, uruguaysuchids, or modern crocodylians fall within the last common ancestor and all descendants of baurusuchids and sebecids.

More recently, other crocodyliforms have been assigned to Sebecosuchia that cannot be placed into either family. These include the genera Eremosuchus, named in 1989, and Pehuenchesuchus, named in 2005. They are usually considered to be more basal sebecosuchians than the sebecids and baurusuchids.

Below is a cladogram showing the possible phylogenetic position of Sebecosuchia modified from Turner and Calvo (2005). In this cladogram, Sebecidae is a paraphyletic assemblage of basal sebecosuchians while Baurusuchidae is monophyletic and includes the more derived sebecosuchians.

- Crocodyliformes
  - Hsisosuchus
  - Mesoeucrocodylia
    - Thalattosuchia
    - Metasuchia
      - Neosuchia
        - - Araripesuchus
          - - Trematochampsidae
            - - Peirosauridae
              - Mahajangasuchidae
        - - Atoposauridae
          - - Goniopholididae
            - - Bernissartia
              - Crocodylia
      - Libycosuchus
      - - Notosuchia
        - Sebecosuchia
          - Pehuenchesuchus
          - - Eremosuchus
            - Sebecus
            - - Iberosuchus
              - Bretesuchus
              - Baurusuchidae
                - Baurusuchus
                - Pabwehshi

In a phylogenetic study of crocodyliforms, Benton and Clark (1988) split up Sebecosuchia, finding baurusuchids to be basal notosuchians while sebecids were basal neosuchians. Since that time, most studies have supported a monophyletic Sebecosuchia. In 2007, however, a phylogenetic study placed baurusuchids as basal metasuchians and sebecids as close relatives to a family of notosuchians called the Peirosauridae. Together, sebecids and peirosaurids made the new clade Sebecia. Below is a cladogram from that study, Larsson and Sues (2007):

- Metasuchia
  - Notosuchia
    - Notosuchus
    - Malawisuchus
  - - Araripesuchus
    - - - Baurusuchus
        - - Neosuchia
          - Sebecia
            - Pabwehshi
            - - Sebecidae
                - Sebecus
                - Bretesuchus
              - Peirosauridae

Two years later, Sereno and Larsson (2009) came to the same conclusion, except they placed baurusuchids as advanced notosuchians. More recently however, Turner and Sertich (2010) found support for Sebecosuchia in their analysis of notosuchian relationships. In their study, Sebecosuchia was a derived clade within Notosuchia. Iori and Carvalho (2011) came to similar conclusions, grouping Baurusuchus alongside Sebecidae. Below is the cladogram from Turner and Sertich (2010):

- Notosuchia
  - Anatosuchus
  - - - Mahajangasuchidae
        - Kaprosuchus
        - Mahajangasuchus
      - Peirosauridae
        - - Peirosaurus
          - Lomasuchus
        - - Hamadasuchus
          - - Montealtosuchus
            - Uberabasuchus
    - - "Araripesuchus" wegeneri
      - - "Araripesuchus" tsangatsangana
        - - - Araripesuchus buitreraensis
            - - Araripesuchus patagonicus
              - Araripesuchus gomesii
          - - Uruguaysuchus
            - Ziphosuchia
              - - Libycosuchus
                - Simosuchus
              - - Malawisuchus
                - - Notosuchidae
                    - Notosuchus
                    - Mariliasuchus
                  - - - Chimaerasuchus
                      - - Sphagesaurus huenei
                        - Sphagesaurus montealtensis
                    - - - Comahuesuchus
                        - - Yacarerani
                          - - Adamantinasuchus
                            - Armadillosuchus
                      - Sebecosuchia
                        - Baurusuchus
                        - Sebecia

Diego Pol and Jaime E. Powell (2011) came to the same conclusion, however their analysis couldn't find a monophyletic Baurusuchidae within Sebecosuchia. The following cladogram simplified after their analysis, with focus on Sebecosuchia.

- - - Chimaerasuchus
    - Sphagesaurus
  - Sebecosuchia
    - Pehuenchesuchus
    - - Cynodontosuchus
      - Baurusuchidae
        - - Pabwehshi
          - Stratiotosuchus
        - - Baurusuchus pachecoi
          - Baurusuchus salgadoensis
      - - Bergisuchidae
          Bergisuchus
        - Iberosuchidae
          Iberosuchus
        - Sebecidae
          - Lorosuchus
          - - Barinasuchus
            - - - Ayllusuchus
                - Bretesuchus
              - - Lumbrera form
                - Langstonia
                - Sebecus
                - Zulmasuchus

== Paleobiology ==
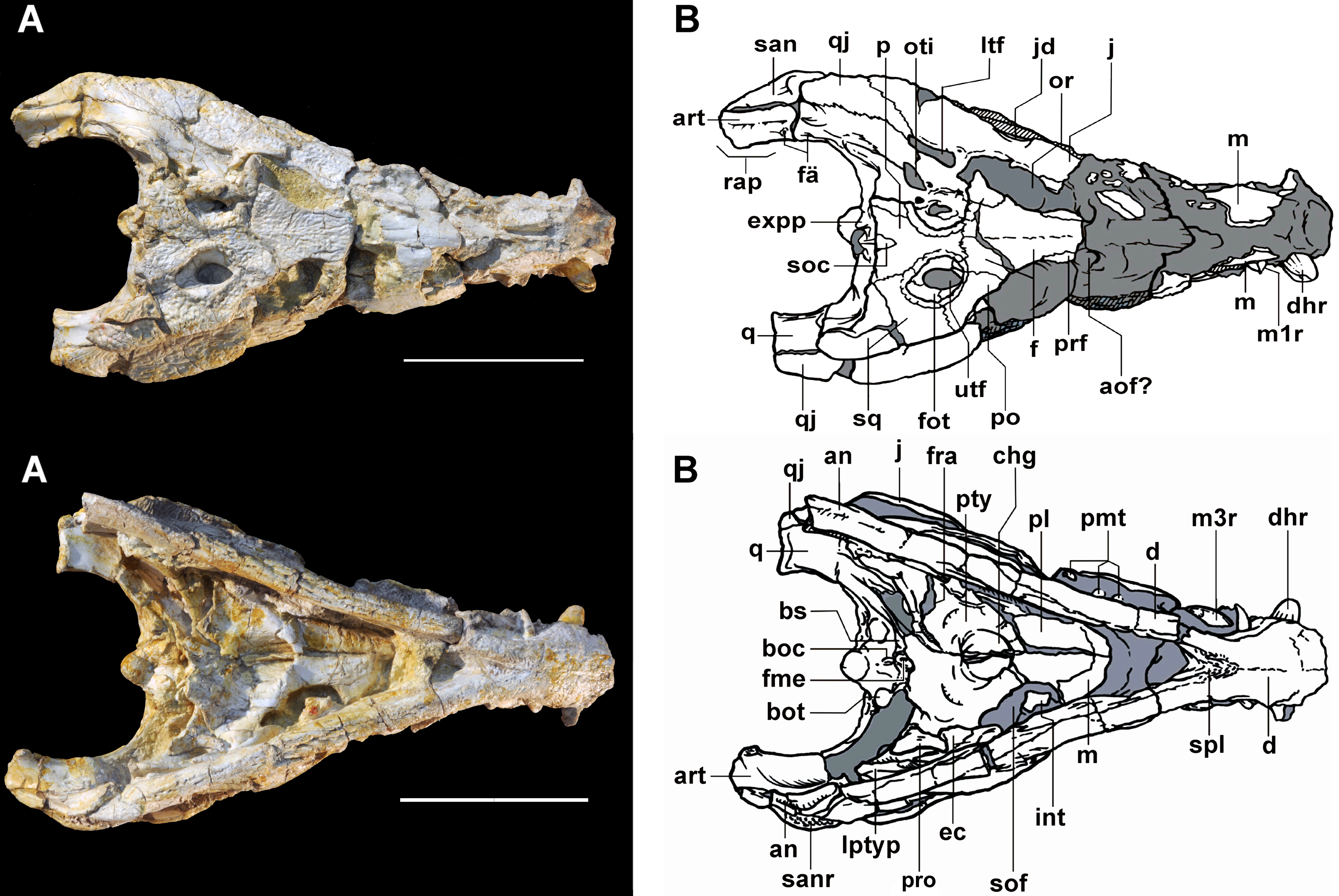
Sahitysuchus skull

All sebecosuchians were carnivorous and terrestrial. The nares open at the very tip of the snout, suggesting that it lived on land rather than in water (in aquatic crocodyliforms, the nares usually open dorsally on top of the snout). The snout itself is laterally compressed, a feature shared with other terrestrial reptiles such as theropod dinosaurs. The eye sockets are opened laterally rather than dorsally as in aquatic crocodyliforms. Moreover, there is a prominent fourth trochanter on the femur for the attachment of muscles that would have aided in upright walking. Although they are now widely accepted to be terrestrial, sebecosuchians were once thought to be semiaquatic, spending part of their time in water.

The laterally compressed snout of sebecosuchians may have enabled them to withstand high forces during biting. The teeth are also laterally compressed, pointed, and serrated. Their shape would have allowed them to easily penetrate and slice flesh. The pterygoid bone in the skull is strongly bent, allowing for a larger jaw adductor muscle to quickly close the jaws and give sebecosuchians a powerful bite.
