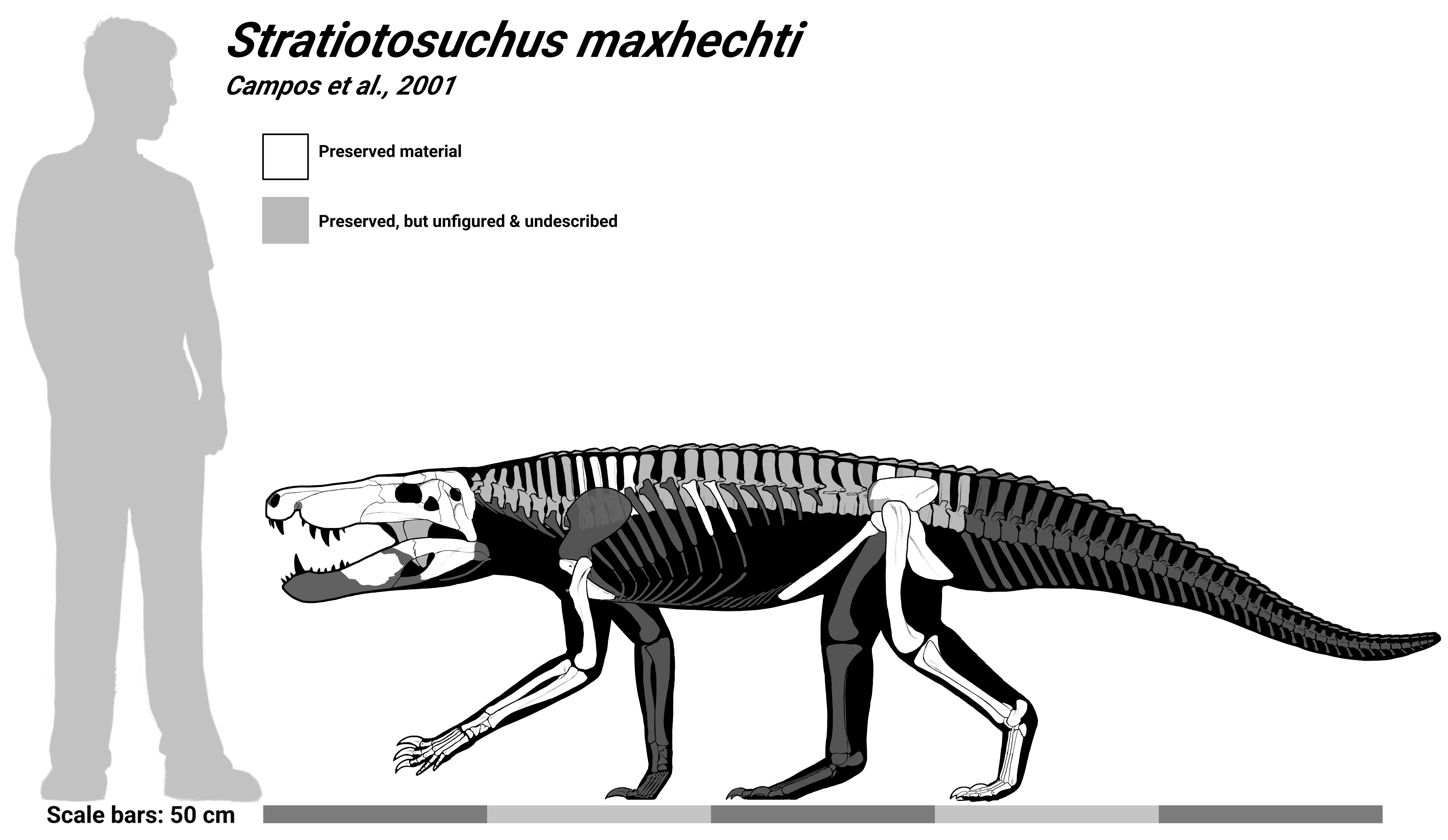
- Skeletal reconstruction and size comparison with a 175 cm tall human
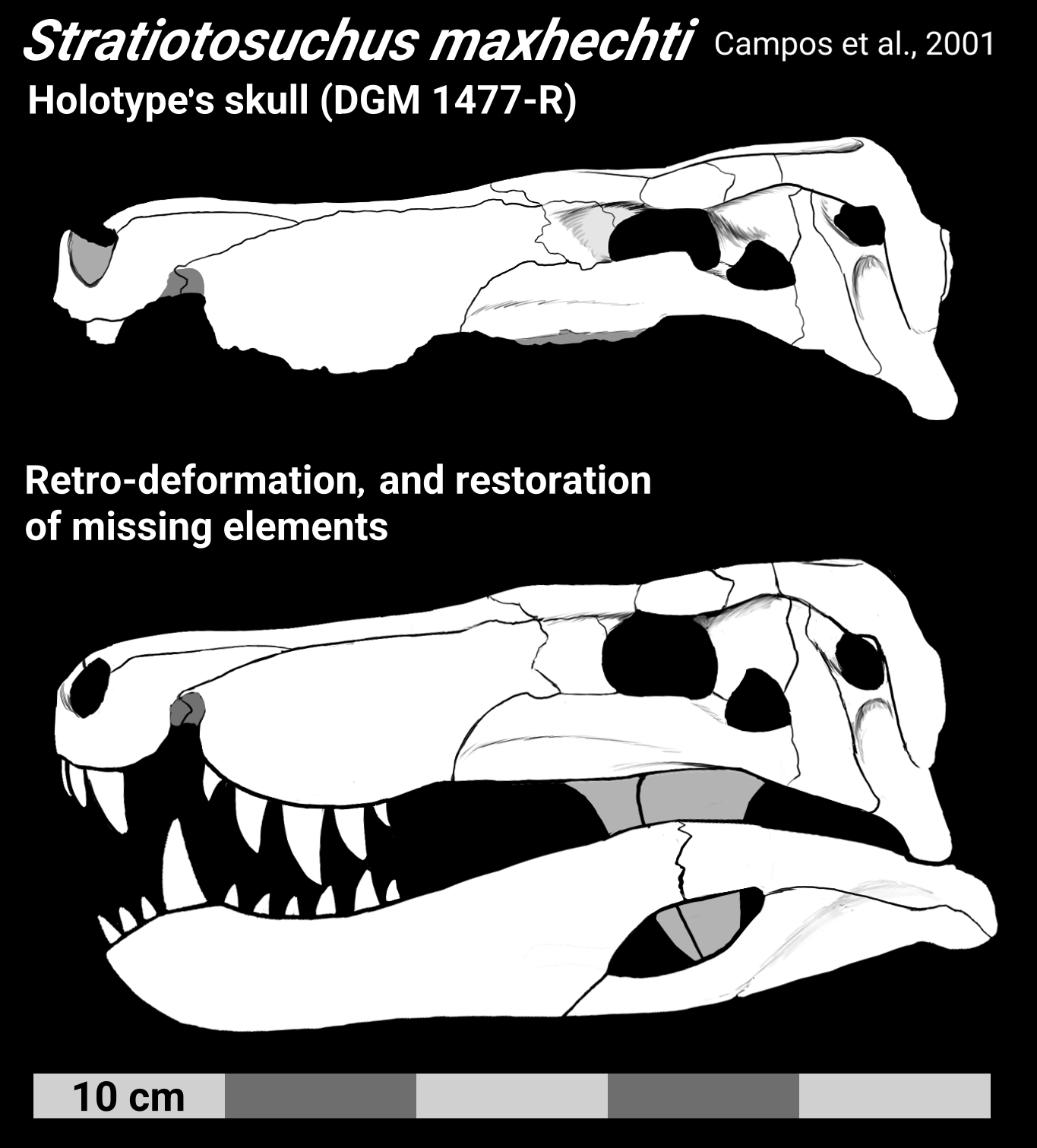
- Skull diagram

Scientific classification
- Kingdom: Animalia
- Phylum: Chordata
- Class: Reptilia
- Clade: Archosauria
- Clade: Pseudosuchia
- Clade: Crocodylomorpha
- Clade: †Notosuchia
- Family: †Baurusuchidae
- Subfamily: †Baurusuchinae
- Genus: †Stratiotosuchus; Campos et al., 2001

Type species
- †Stratiotosuchus maxhechti Campos et al., 2001

= Stratiotosuchus =

Stratiotosuchus Temporal range: Late Cretaceous, Campanian–Maastrichtian

Prehistoric genus of reptiles

Stratiotosuchus (from Greek, στρατιώτης (stratiōtēs, "soldier") and σοῦχος (soûchos, "crocodile")) is an extinct genus of baurusuchid mesoeucrocodylian from the Adamantina Formation in Brazil. It lived during the Late Cretaceous. The first fossils were found in the 1980s, and the type species Stratiotosuchus maxhechti was named in 2001. A hyperpredator, it and other baurusuchids may have filled niches occupied elsewhere by theropod dinosaurs.

== Description ==
Stratiotosuchus has a robust, laterally compressed skull that is 47 centimetres (19 in) long, among the largest known baurusuchids. While the holotype skull is slightly taphonomically compressed vertically, it was an overally long-snouted animal. The teeth are ziphodont, meaning that they are laterally compressed, curved, and serrated. Most baurusuchids have a reduced number of teeth, with four in their premaxilla and five in their maxilla, but Stratiotosuchus possessed only 3 premaxillary teeth on its holotype. Comparisons with modern crocodiles in regards to loss in tooth-count, the great size of the specimen, and lack of an open notch between both of its palpebrals resulting from fusion of the bones, suggest that Stratiotosuchus's specimen is a very mature individual. When the jaw is closed, the teeth of the upper jaw overlie those of the lower jaw and shear closely together. Stratiotosuchus has one large caniniform tooth in its premaxilla, and several large maxillary teeth behind it. An enlarged fourth dentary tooth in the lower jaw also forms a canine, and is visible when the jaw is closed.

=== Posture ===
Like all crocodyliforms, Stratiotosuchus was quadrupedal. Unlike the sprawling gait of crocodilians living today, Stratiotosuchus is thought to have been a fully erect quadruped. The transition from a sprawling, low to the ground posture in the ancestors of Stratiotosuchus to an erect, elevated posture involved a significant transformation of the limbs, hips, and shoulders.

Large crests are present over the acetabulum, or hip socket, stabilizing the hip in what is known as a pillar-erect stance (the acetabular crest lies like a shelf on top of the femur to form a pillar). The ischium bone, which extends backward from the hip, has a large projection that in life would serve as a strong attachment site for the puboischiotibialis muscle. The puboischiotibialis is also present in living crocodilians and is used primarily to keep the legs upright in what is known as a high walk, in which they hold their legs underneath them while walking. The puboischiotibialis is very weak in living crocodilians, so they cannot sustain a high walk for very long. Stratiotosuchus is thought to have had a much stronger puboischiotibialis, allowing it to have a permanent upright stance.

Stratiotosuchus also has a relatively straight femur bone; while the bone is somewhat twisted along its length, the degree of torsion is not as high as that of other crocodyliforms. The shape of the femur is more similar to that of rauisuchids and poposaurids, which were early crocodile relatives that are known to have had erect gaits. The femur even shares similarities with those of early theropod dinosaurs, which were fully bipedal. When compared to crocodilians, the top of the femur of Stratiotosuchus is rotated toward the front, so that the femoral head faces backward rather than medially inward. This position restricts the movement of the hindlimbs along a forward-backward or parasagittal axis. Muscles that attach to the side of the leg in crocodilians would have attached to the back of the leg in Stratiotosuchus, enabling a powerful backward extension of the hind leg.

The arm socket faces backwards and downwards from a bone in the shoulder girdle called the coracoid, suggesting that the arms were held beneath the body. The large articular surface on the head of the humerus implies that the arms had a wide range of movement, but restricted to a parasagittal axis. The deltopectoral crest on the front of the humerus would have anchored large arm muscles to bring the arm forward while walking. Modern crocodilians also have a deltopectoral crest, but it is positioned laterally and anchors to muscles that pull the arms up to the sides, not forward. The muscle thought to have facilitated forward movement in Stratiotosuchus is called the deltoideus clavicularis; it is also present in modern crocodilians, which use it for high walking.

Other features that suggest an erect posture are tightly clustered metacarpals forming narrow hands well-suited for walking and a backward-projecting calcaneal tuberosity in the ankle, which would have attached to muscles that fixed the lower limb in a parasagittal axis. A backward-projecting calcaneal tuberosity is present in most early crocodilian relatives, including those that are thought have sprawling gaits, yet modern crocodilians have more laterally projected tuberosities impeding a parasagittal orientation of the hind foot.

== History ==
The first known fossil of Stratiotosuchus was a nearly complete skeleton, cataloged as DGM 1477-R. It was found by paleontologist José Martin Suárez in the town of Irapuru in São Paulo State in 1988. This skeleton and all other specimens of Stratiotosuchus come from the Adamantina Formation, which is either Turonian-Santonian in age (about 85 million years old) or Campanian-Maastrichtian in age (about 70 million years old). DGM 1477-R includes a nearly complete skull, partial lower jaw, vertebral column, and limb bones. The skeleton was identified as that of a baurusuchid, closely related but distinct from Baurusuchus pachechoi, which had been known since 1945. Stratiotosuchus maxhechti was named in 2001 on the basis of this skeleton, designated the holotype of the species. The generic name, Stratiotosuchus, means "soldier crocodile" in Greek, and the specific name, maxhechti, honors paleontologist Max Knobler Hetch (1925–2002).

Further preparation of DGM 1477-R revealed that two individuals were present in the same block of sandstone, as indicated by two extra leg bones, an extra fragment of the hip, and extra metatarsals. They are the same size as the other bones, suggesting that the second individual was equal in body size to the first.

Another specimen preserving the posterior half of the skull and jaws had been found in 1974, and later identified to be from Stratiotosuchus in 2008

== Classification ==
Stratiotosuchus has been recognized as a baurusuchid since it was first described in 1988. In 2004, Baurusuchidae was even defined as the most recent common ancestor of Baurusuchus and Stratiotosuchus and all of its descendants; thus, the definition of Baurusuchidae relies on the inclusion of Stratiotosuchus. Stratiotosuchus and Baurusuchus both belong to a large clade called Metasuchia, which includes living crocodilians and many extinct relatives extending back into the Jurassic. However, the exact position of Stratiotosuchus and Baurusuchus within Metasuchia is still uncertain. Below are several possibilities that have been uncovered in various phylogenetic analyses:

- Baurusuchidae is grouped with the family Sebecidae in a clade called Sebecosuchia.
- Sebecids are closer to Neosuchia (the group including modern crocodilians), while baurusuchids are either basal metasuchians or deeply nested within Notosuchia, a large clade of extinct metasuchians.
- Baurusuchidae is polyphyletic, with Stratiotosuchus and Baurusuchus positioned as basal metasuchians while other baurusuchids are placed in the clade Sebecia along with sebecids. This also makes Sebecosuchia polyphyletic.

Montefeltro et al. (2011) found support for baurusuchids as advanced notosuchians, and divided the family into two subfamilies, Baurusuchinae and Pissarrachampsinae. Stratiotosuchus belonged to Baurusuchinae along with Baurusuchus. Below is the cladogram from Montefeltro et al. (2011):

- Notosuchia
  - Notosuchus
  - - Mariliasuchus
    - - Armadillosuchus
      - Baurusuchia/Baurusuchidae
        - Cynodontosuchus
        - - Pissarrachampsinae
            - Pissarrachampsa
            - Wargosuchus
          - Baurusuchinae
            - Stratiotosuchus
            - Baurusuchus
              - B. albertoi
              - - B. salgadoensis
                - B. pachecoi

Another phylogenetic analysis of baurusuchids was conducted by Riff and Kellner (2011). Their analysis placed Stratiotosuchus and Baurusuchus deep within Notosuchia, as the sister taxon of the family Sphagesauridae. Below is the cladogram from that study:

- Metasuchia
  - - Araripesuchus
    - Notosuchia
      - - Uruguaysuchus
        - Candidodon
      - - Libycosuchus
        - - Simosuchus
          - - - Chimaerasuchus
              - Malawisuchus
            - - Notosuchus
              - - Mariliasuchus
                - - Comahuesuchus
                  - - Sphagesauridae
                      - Adamantinasuchus
                      - - Armadillosuchus
                        - Sphagesaurus
                    - Baurusuchidae
                      - Stratiotosuchus
                      - Baurusuchus
  - - Lomasuchus
    - - - Stolokrosuchus
        - - Sebecidae
            - Bretesuchus
            - Sebecus
          - - Uberabasuchus
            - Hamadasuchus
      - Neosuchia

== Paleobiology ==
=== Paleoenvironment ===
Based on the types of deposits in the Adamantina Formation, Stratiotosuchus most likely lived alongside a river system with many small ephemeral lakes.

=== Similarities to theropod dinosaurs ===
With a fully erect stance, Stratiotosuchus has many features convergent with theropod dinosaurs, which are fully bipedal. In Stratiotosuchus, a roughly surfaced region on the upper part of the femur is analogous to the accessory trochanter common to tetanuran theropods. These projections are thought to have anchored the same muscle, called the puboischiofemoralis internus pars dorsalis. A crest on the forward edge of the tibia is similar to those seen in early theropod dinosaurs. The articular surface of the tibia that attaches to the femur is laterally compressed, which is unlike the more circular surface in living crocodilians and more like that of a theropod dinosaur. On the hip of Stratiotosuchus, a depression on the ilium is convergent with the brevis fossa of dinosaurs, and the small bump anchoring the puboischiotibialis muscle is convergent with the obturator tubercle of maniraptoriform theropods.

Along with anatomical similarities, Stratiotosuchus and other baurusuchids are thought to have had lifestyles very similar to those of theropod dinosaurs. While many small carnivorous crocodyliforms are known from the Adamantina Formation, Stratiotosuchus and Baurusuchus are believed to have been the only large carnivores the Adamantina ecosystem. Decades of paleontological exploration in these deposits have uncovered only a few theropod dinosaur bones, so it appears that baurusuchids like Stratiotosuchus occupied the niche of top predators in the absence of these dinosaurs. A nearby Cretaceous deposit in Argentina called the Neuquén Group also contains baurusuchids, but they are much smaller than Stratiotosuchus and were likely out-competed by the wide range of theropod dinosaurs known from these deposits. In the absence of large theropods, carnivores like Stratiotosuchus may have fed on large herbivorous titanosaurs, including Adamantisaurus, Arrudatitan, Gondwanatitan, and Maxakalisaurus.

Pseudosuchians superficially resembling Stratiotosuchus were the top predators of the Triassic period, until they were decimated by the Triassic–Jurassic extinction event and replaced by large theropods. The appearance of Stratiotosuchus and other baurusuchids marks a brief recovery of this top position during the Late Cretaceous. Niche partitioning existed between large theropods and baurusuchids where they overlapped in range.
