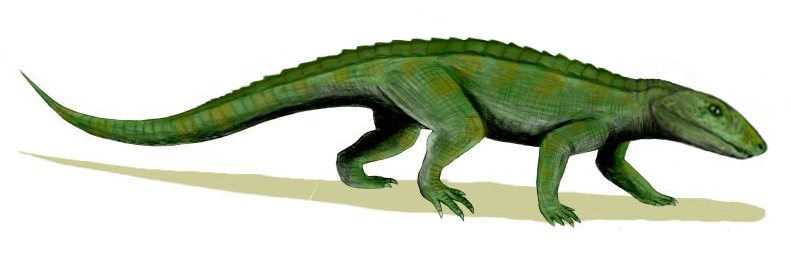
- Life restoration of Notosuchus terrestris

Scientific classification
- Kingdom: Animalia
- Phylum: Chordata
- Class: Reptilia
- Clade: Archosauria
- Clade: Pseudosuchia
- Clade: Crocodylomorpha
- Clade: Mesoeucrocodylia
- Clade: Metasuchia
- Clade: †Notosuchia
- Clade: †Ziphosuchia; Ortega et al., 2000

Subgroups
- †Doratodon; †Microsuchus?; †Sebecia; †Notosuchia

= Ziphosuchia =

Ziphosuchians Temporal range: Middle Jurassic - Middle Miocene, 167–11 Ma

Extinct clade of reptiles

Ziphosuchia is a clade of mesoeucrocodylian crocodyliforms that includes notosuchians and sebecosuchians.

== Systematics ==
First constructed in 2000, it was considered to include Notosuchus, Libycosuchus, and Sebecosuchia. In a 2004 phylogenetic study, it was defined as the most recent common ancestor of Notosuchus, Libycosuchus, and Baurusuchoidea and all of its descendants.

Ziphosuchia is often considered to be the sister group of Neosuchia, a clade that includes modern crocodilians. Razanandrongobe is the oldest representative of this clade.
