= Pabwehshi =

Pabwehshi Temporal range: Late Cretaceous, Maastrichtian

Scientific classification
- Kingdom: Animalia
- Phylum: Chordata
- Class: Reptilia
- Clade: Pseudosuchia
- Clade: Crocodylomorpha
- Clade: †Notosuchia
- Family: †Baurusuchidae
- Subfamily: †Baurusuchinae
- Genus: †Pabwehshi; Wilson et al., 2001

Species
- †P. pakistanensis Wilson et al., 2001 (type)

Extinct genus of reptiles

Pabwehshi (meaning "Pab [Formation] beast ["wehshi" in Urdu]") is an extinct genus of baurusuchine mesoeucrocodylian. It is based on GSP-UM 2000, a partial snout and corresponding lower jaw elements, with another snout assigned to it. These specimens were found in Maastrichtian-age Upper Cretaceous rocks of the Vitakri and Pab formations in Balochistan, Pakistan, and represent the first diagnostic crocodyliform fossils from Cretaceous rocks of South Asia. Pabwehshi had serrated interlocking teeth in its snout that formed a "zig-zag" cutting edge. Pabwehshi was named in 2001 by Jeffrey A. Wilson and colleagues. The type species is P. pakistanensis, in reference to the nation where it was found. It was traditionally classified as a baurusuchid closely related to Cynodontosuchus and Baurusuchus. Larsson and Sues (2007) found close affinity between Pabwehshi and the Peirosauridae within Sebecia. Montefeltro et al. Pabwehshi has a sagittal torus on its maxillary palatal shelves – a character that is absent in baurusuchids – but they did not include Pabwehshi in their phylogenetic analysis.
