= Gondwanasuchus =

Gondwanasuchus Temporal range: Late Cretaceous

Scientific classification
- Kingdom: Animalia
- Phylum: Chordata
- Class: Reptilia
- Clade: Archosauria
- Clade: Pseudosuchia
- Clade: Crocodylomorpha
- Clade: †Notosuchia
- Clade: †Sebecosuchia
- Family: †Baurusuchidae
- Subfamily: †Pissarrachampsinae
- Genus: †Gondwanasuchus; Marinho, Iori, Carvalho & Vasconcelos, 2013

Type species
- †Gondwanasuchus scabrosus Marinho et al., 2013

Extinct genus of reptiles

Gondwanasuchus is an extinct genus of baurusuchid crocodyliforms from the Late Cretaceous Adamantina Formation of Brazil. The type species is Gondwanasuchus scabrosus. It was recently concluded to be a juvenile specimen of a bigger Baurusuchid species, and therefore a nomen dubium
