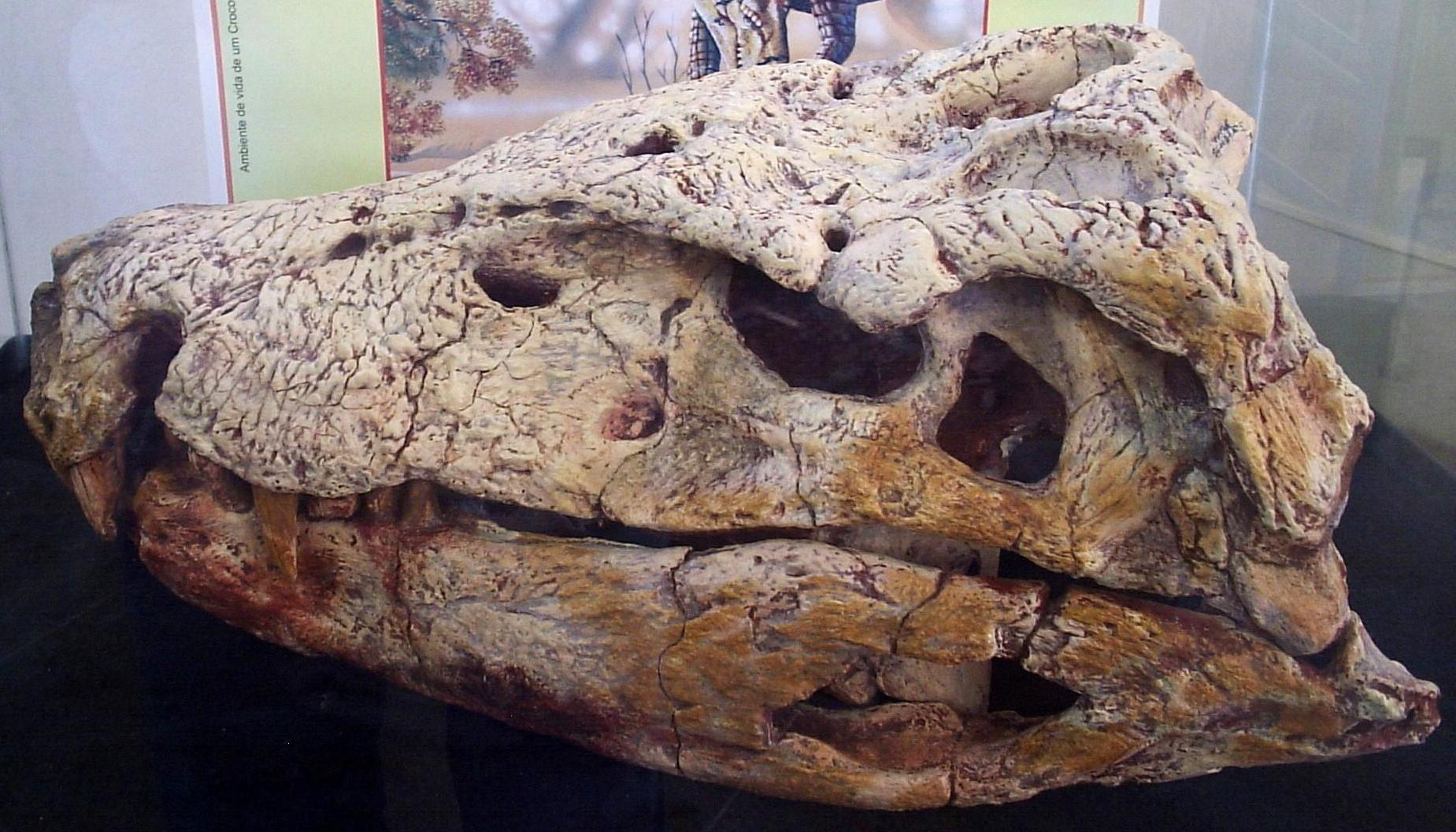
- Skull of Baurusuchus salgadoensis
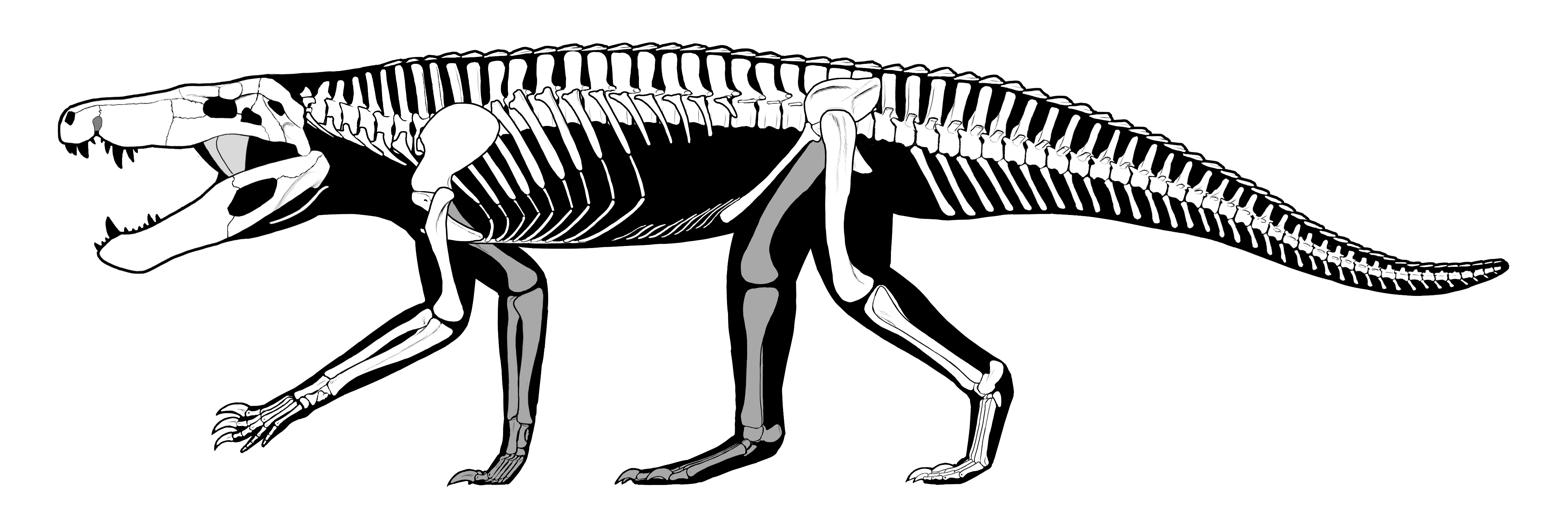
- Skeletal reconstruction

Scientific classification
- Kingdom: Animalia
- Phylum: Chordata
- Class: Reptilia
- Clade: Pseudosuchia
- Clade: Crocodylomorpha
- Clade: †Notosuchia
- Family: †Baurusuchidae
- Subfamily: †Baurusuchinae
- Genus: †Baurusuchus; Price, 1945

Type species
- †Baurusuchus pachecoi Price, 1945

Other species
- †B. albertoi? Nascimento & Zaher, 2010; †B. salgadoensis Carvalho et al., 2005

= Baurusuchus =

Baurusuchus Temporal range: Late Cretaceous, Turonian–Santonian

Extinct genus of reptiles

Baurusuchus is an extinct genus of baurusuchid mesoeucrocodylian, which lived in Brazil from 90 to 83.5 million years ago, in the Late Cretaceous period. It was a terrestrial predator, estimated to reach up to 113.4 kilograms (250 lb) in weight. Baurusuchus lived during the Turonian to Santonian stages of the Late Cretaceous Period, in Adamantina Formation, Brazil. It gets its name from the Brazilian Bauru Group ("Bauru crocodile"). It was related to the earlier-named Cynodontosuchus rothi, which was smaller, with weaker dentition.

The three species are B. pachecoi, named after Eng Joviano Pacheco, its discoverer, B. salgadoensis (named after General Salgado County in São Paulo, Brazil) and B. albertoi (named after Alberto Barbosa de Carvalho, Brazilian paleontologist). The latter species is disputed (see phylogeny section). Its relatives include the similarly sized Stratiotosuchus from the Adamantina Formation, and Pabweshi, from the Pakistani Pab Formation.

== Paleoecology ==
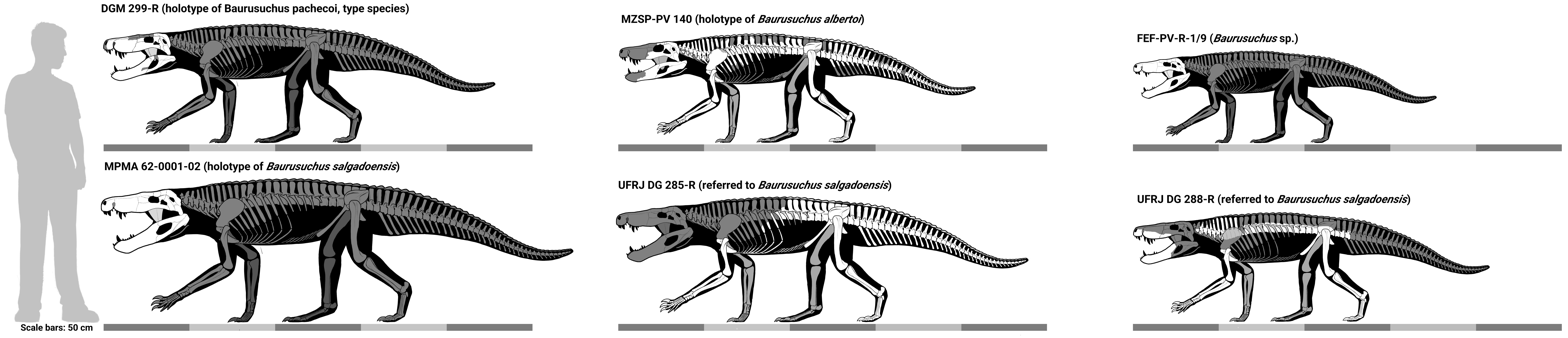
Skeletal diagram and size comparison showing some of the different Baurusuchus specimens in scientific literature (human: 175 cm tall). Several more specimens have been discovered and stored in museums

B. salgadoensis is seen as a terrestrial predator, living in a hot and arid climate. The position of the external nares was unsuited for an amphibious lifestyle like in modern crocodilians and the snout and teeth are laterally compressed like in theropods. Both of this supports the terrestrial hypothesis. The hot environment hypothesis is based on the lifestyle of modern crocodilians and the stratigraphy of Baurusuchus. B. salgadoensis was found in fine massive sandstones which are interpreted as a floodplain area in a hot and arid climate. Baurusuchus was likely able to dig holes for finding water in dry seasons or, like modern alligators do, for thermoregulation. The occurrence of several complete skeletons and skulls of different ontogenetic stages in correlated stratigraphic levels supports this. Such a strategy would have made it less water-bound than most modern crocodiles, allowing it to live in more continental climate. The enlarged and strongly bent pterygoids allowed for attachment of powerful muscles that could close its jaw very quickly, with its oreinirostral (dome-shaped) skull being well adapted to resist stresses, and produce a considerably strong bite force for its size (between 2542–3088 Newtons in B. salgadoensis), being comparable to that of the american alligator. The skull and tooth morphology indicates that the biting strategies of Baurusuchus were similar to a Komodo dragon which include ambushing the prey, biting it and pulling back the serrated, blade-like teeth. Perhaps violently shaking prey with its jaws like modern crocodiles, helped by its enlarged cervical neural spines, which served as large muscle attachments. Baurusuchus likely played an important role in its ecosystem, competing with the abelisaurids for food.

== Classification ==
Baurusuchus is the type genus of the family Baurusuchidae, a family consisting of crocodilians with elongated and laterally compressed skulls. Other members of that family from the Cretaceous of South America include Stratiotosuchus and Cynodontosuchus, but baurusuchids are also known from the Cretaceous of Asia (Pakistan) and the Tertiary of Europe.

A study in 2011 erected a new subfamily called Baurusuchinae. Seven diagnostic features for the group were described which include the moderate size and the broad frontals. The paper referred only Stratiotosuchus maxhechti and Baurusuchus to the subfamily, making Stratiotosuchus Baurusuchus' closest relative so far. However, a study in the year 2014 referred a new species called Aplestosuchus sordidus to the subfamily, but supported a closer relationship of Baurususchus with Stratiotosuchus than with it. The species B. albertoi is an exception. The paper does not support its affiliation to Baurusuchus and views it as a close relative of Aplestosuchus. This is the cladogram they presented:

- - Notosuchus terrestris
  - - Mariliasuchus amarali
    - - Armadillosuchus arrudai
      - Baurusuchidae
        - Cynodontosuchus rothi
        - - Gondwanasuchus scabrosus
          - - Pissarrachampsinae
              - Campinasuchus dinizi
              - - Pissarrachampsa sera
                - Wargosuchus australis
            - Baurusuchinae
              - - Aplestosuchus sordidus
                - "Baurusuchus" albertoi
              - - Stratiotosuchus maxhechti
                - - Baurusuchus salgadoensis
                  - Baurusuchus pachecoi

== Sources ==
- In the Shadow of the Dinosaurs: Early Mesozoic Tetrapods by Nicholas C. Fraser and Hans-Dieter Sues
- The Osteology of the Reptiles by Alfred Sherwood Romer
