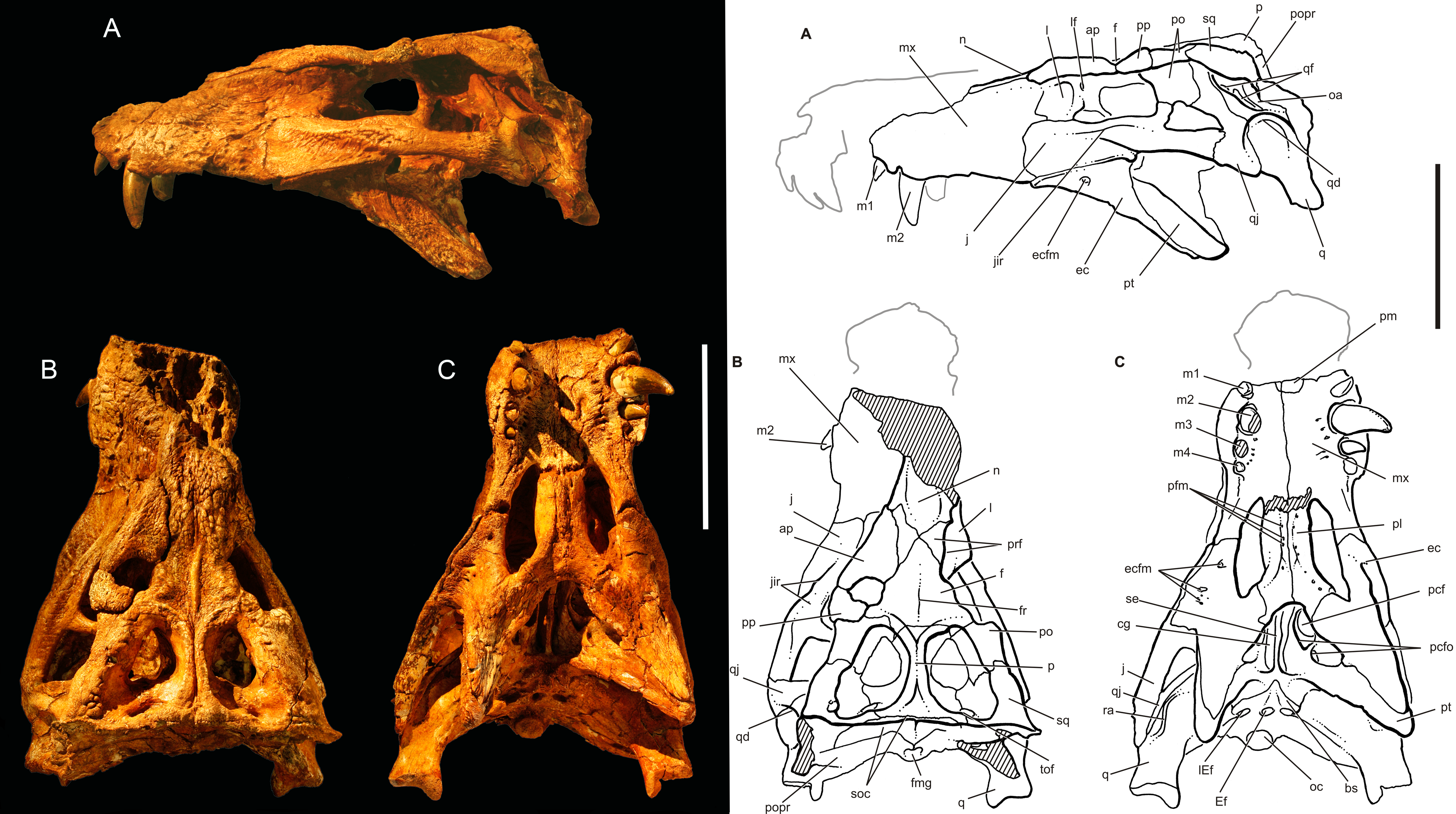
- Skull of Pissarrachampsa sera

Scientific classification
- Kingdom: Animalia
- Phylum: Chordata
- Class: Reptilia
- Clade: Archosauria
- Clade: Pseudosuchia
- Clade: Crocodylomorpha
- Clade: †Notosuchia
- Clade: †Sebecosuchia
- Family: †Baurusuchidae
- Subfamily: †Pissarrachampsinae; Montefeltro et al., 2011

= Pissarrachampsinae =

Pissarrachampsinae Temporal range: Santonian - Maastrichtian, 83.5–66.5 Ma

Extinct subfamily of reptiles

Pissarrachampsinae is a subfamily of baurusuchid crocodyliforms from the Late Cretaceous of Brazil and Argentina. It was named in 2011 with the description of Pissarrachampsa sera and includes P. sera from Brazil and the related Wargosuchus australis from Argentina. Pissarrachampsinae is one of two subfamilies of Baurusuchidae, the other being Baurusuchinae.

Pissarrachampsines are distinguished from baurusuchines mainly by the shapes of bones on the tops of their skulls. The nasals and frontal touch each other at only a small point on the midline of the skull. The frontal bone, which is positioned directly behind the prefrontals, bears a groove that runs along its midline. Pissarrachampsines also have a pitted depression at the tip of the snout called the circumnarial fossa. The nostril openings are found within this fossa.

Phylogenetically, Pissarrachampsinae is a stem-based taxon. When it was named, Pissarrachampsinae was defined as Pissarrachampsa sera and all crocodyliforms more closely related to it than to Stratiotosuchus maxhechti, Baurusuchus pachecoi, Notosuchus terrestris, Mariliasuchus amarali, Armadillosuchus arrudai, Araripesuchus gomesi, Sebecus icaeorhinus, Bretesuchus bonapartei, Peirosaurus torminni, and Crocodylus niloticus.

The subfamily Pissarrachampsinae may have lasted up to 20 million years. Wargosuchus is known from the Bajo de la Carpa Formation, which is Santonian in age, while Pissarrachampsa is known from the Campanian to Maastrichtian Vale do Rio do Peixe Formation. The age of the Vale do Rio do Peixe Formation may be even older, however, making the span of the family shorter.
