= Wargosuchus =

Wargosuchus Temporal range: Late Cretaceous, Santonian

Scientific classification
- Domain: Eukaryota
- Kingdom: Animalia
- Phylum: Chordata
- Class: Reptilia
- Clade: Archosauria
- Clade: Pseudosuchia
- Clade: Crocodylomorpha
- Clade: Crocodyliformes
- Clade: †Notosuchia
- Clade: †Sebecosuchia
- Family: †Baurusuchidae
- Subfamily: †Pissarrachampsinae
- Genus: †Wargosuchus; Martinelli & Pais, 2008

Type species
- †Wargosuchus australis Martinelli & Pais, 2008

Extinct genus of reptiles

Wargosuchus (meaning "warg crocodile") is an extinct genus of baurusuchid crocodyliforms from the Late Cretaceous of Argentina. It is known from a fragmentary skull from the Santonian-age Bajo de la Carpa Formation of the Neuquén Group, found in the vicinity of Neuquén, Neuquén Province, and was described by Agustín Martinelli and Diego Pais in 2008. The type species, and so far the only species, is Wargosuchus australis.

Wargosuchus is based on MOZ-PV 6134, a partial right premaxilla and maxilla, and partial skull roof. Martinelli and Pais distinguished Wargosuchus from other mesoeucrocodylians by skull details, such as a deep groove on the midline of the frontal bones, a large depression for the olfactory bulbs, and enlargement of the last tooth of the premaxilla followed by a deep pit for the following tooth of the lower jaw. The animal had a robust skull. It shared its setting with four other taxa of mesoeucrocodylians: common Notosuchus, and rare Cynodontosuchus, Lomasuchus, and Gasparinisuchus.
