= Cynodontosuchus =

Cynodontosuchus Temporal range: Coniacian-Danian (Tiupampan) ~85–62 Ma

Scientific classification
- Kingdom: Animalia
- Phylum: Chordata
- Class: Reptilia
- Clade: Archosauria
- Clade: Pseudosuchia
- Clade: Crocodylomorpha
- Clade: †Notosuchia
- Family: †Baurusuchidae
- Genus: †Cynodontosuchus; Woodward 1896

Species
- †C. rothi Woodward 1896 (type)

Extinct genus of reptiles

Cynodontosuchus is an extinct genus of baurusuchid mesoeucrocodylian. Fossils have been found from Argentina of Late Cretaceous age from the Bajo de la Carpa Formation (dating back to the Santonian), the Pichi Picun Leufu Formation (dating back to the Coniacian and Santonian). the Tiupampan Santa Lucía Formation of Bolivia.

== Description ==
Cynodontosuchus was the first non-Cenozoic sebecosuchian to be described, being assigned to the suborder in 1896 by Arthur Smith Woodward. It was described on the basis of an incomplete snout and articulated lower jaw. The presence of a large saber-like second maxillary tooth and a diastema between the maxilla and premaxilla that made room for a large mandibular tooth suggests that Cynodontosuchus is a member of the family Baurusuchidae. It has been proposed several times that the genus is a senior synonym of Baurusuchus. However, it differs from Baurusuchus in that its rostrum is less deep and has five maxillary teeth.
