= Elizabeth Gomani-Chindebvu =

Malawian palaeontologist

- Other name: Elizabeth Gomani
- Citizenship: Malawian
- Education: Southern Methodist University (MS 1998, PhD 2004)
- Known for: Describing Malawisuchus and Karongasaurus; research on Malawisuchus
- Scientific career
- Fields: Vertebrate palaeontology; archaeology; cultural heritage
- Workplaces: Department of Antiquities (Malawi); Ministry of Tourism, Wildlife and Culture; Ministry of Local Government, Unity and Culture
- Thesis: Dinosaurs of the Cretaceous Sedimentary Rocks of Northern Malawi, Africa

Elizabeth Gomani-Chindebvu (published as Elizabeth M Gomani before her marriage) is a Malawian vertebrate palaeontologist and senior civil servant. She described the Early Cretaceous crocodyliform Malawisuchus in 1997 and the titanosaurian sauropod Karongasaurus in 2005, and has co-authored research on Middle Stone Age archaeology in northern Malawi. She has served as Director of Culture in Malawi's Ministry of Tourism, Wildlife and Culture and, from 2023, as Principal Secretary in the Ministry of Local Government, Unity and Culture.

== Education ==
Gomani-Chindebvu studied at Southern Methodist University (SMU) in Dallas, Texas, where she earned a master's degree in 1998 and PhD in 2004. Her doctoral dissertation was titled Dinosaurs of the Cretaceous Sedimentary Rocks of Northern Malawi, Africa. A photograph of her doing fieldwork as an SMU student appears on the explanatory panel beside the Malawisaurus mounted in the foyer of the Perot Museum of Nature and Science in Dallas.

== Palaeontological research ==
Gomani-Chindebvu's early work was on the Dinosaur Beds of Karonga District in northern Malawi, an Early Cretaceous deposit worked by the Malawi Dinosaur Project, a collaboration between Malawi's Department of Antiquities and Southern Methodist University that began in 1984. In 1993, she co-authored a paper in Palaeontology with Louis L Jacobs, Dale A Winkler, and William R Downs describing new material of the titanosauroid sauropod Malawisaurus dixeyi.

== Archaeological research ==
From the 2010s Gomani-Chindebvu has co-authored a series of studies on the Middle Stone Age and Later Stone Age of Karonga District with archaeologist Jessica C Thompson and colleagues. These include a 2013 paper using GIS to integrate old and new archaeological data from Stone Age deposits in Karonga.

== Government career ==
Gomani-Chindebvu worked for many years in Malawi's Department of Antiquities, the state body responsible for palaeontological and archaeological heritage. By 2013, she was Director of Culture in the Ministry of Tourism, Wildlife and Culture, where she spoke publicly about the country's dinosaur discoveries and their relationship to fossils found in Tanzania, Niger, Madagascar and South America through the former supercontinent of Gondwana.

By May 2022 Gomani-Chindebvu was the Principal Secretary of Malawi's Ministry of National Unity. That month, she led a four-member delegation on a three-day working visit to Accra to study Ghana's National Commission of Civic Education (NCCE), as part of a public sector reform under which the ministry was lobbying government to transform the National Initiative for Civic Education (NICE) Trust into a national civic education commission. She described the NCCE as the best civic education institution in Africa, and Malawi became the second African country after The Gambia to study Ghana's civic education structure.

== Selected publications ==
- Jacobs, L. L., Winkler, D. A., Downs, W. R. and Gomani, E. M. (1993). "New material of an Early Cretaceous titanosaurid sauropod dinosaur from Malawi". Palaeontology 36 (3): 523-534.
- Gomani, E. M. (1997). "A crocodyliform from the Early Cretaceous Dinosaur Beds, northern Malawi". Journal of Vertebrate Paleontology 17 (2): 280-294.
- Gomani, E. M. (2005). "Sauropod dinosaurs from the Early Cretaceous of Malawi, Africa". Palaeontologia Electronica 8 (1): 27A, 1-37.
- Thompson, J. C., Welling, M. and Gomani-Chindebvu, E. (2013). "Using GIS to integrate old and new archaeological data from Stone Age deposits in Karonga, Malawi". International Journal of Heritage in the Digital Era 2 (4): 611-630.
- Thompson, J. C., Mackay, A., de Moor, V. and Gomani-Chindebvu, E. (2014). "Catchment survey in the Karonga District: A landscape-scale analysis of provisioning and core reduction strategies during the Middle Stone Age of northern Malawi". African Archaeological Review 31 (3): 447-478.
- Kruger, A., Rubidge, B. S., Abdala, F., Gomani Chindebvu, E. and Jacobs, L. L. (2015). "Lende chiweta, a new therapsid from Malawi, and its influence on burnetiamorph phylogeny and biogeography". Journal of Vertebrate Paleontology 35 (6): e1008698.
- Andrzejewski, K. A., Polcyn, M. J., Winkler, D. A., Gomani Chindebvu, E. and Jacobs, L. L. (2019). "The braincase of Malawisaurus dixeyi (Sauropoda: Titanosauria): A 3D reconstruction of the brain endocast and inner ear". PLOS One 14 (2): e0211423.
- Gomani Chindebvu, E., Jacobs, L. L., Juwayeyi, Y. M., Perez, M. L., Polcyn, M. J., Simfukwe, H. H., Vineyard, D. P. and Winkler, D. A. (2023). "The Mwesia Beds of northern Malawi in relation to the Tanganyika Problem". Geological Society, London, Special Publications 543: 383-393.
