= List of fossiliferous stratigraphic units in Malawi =

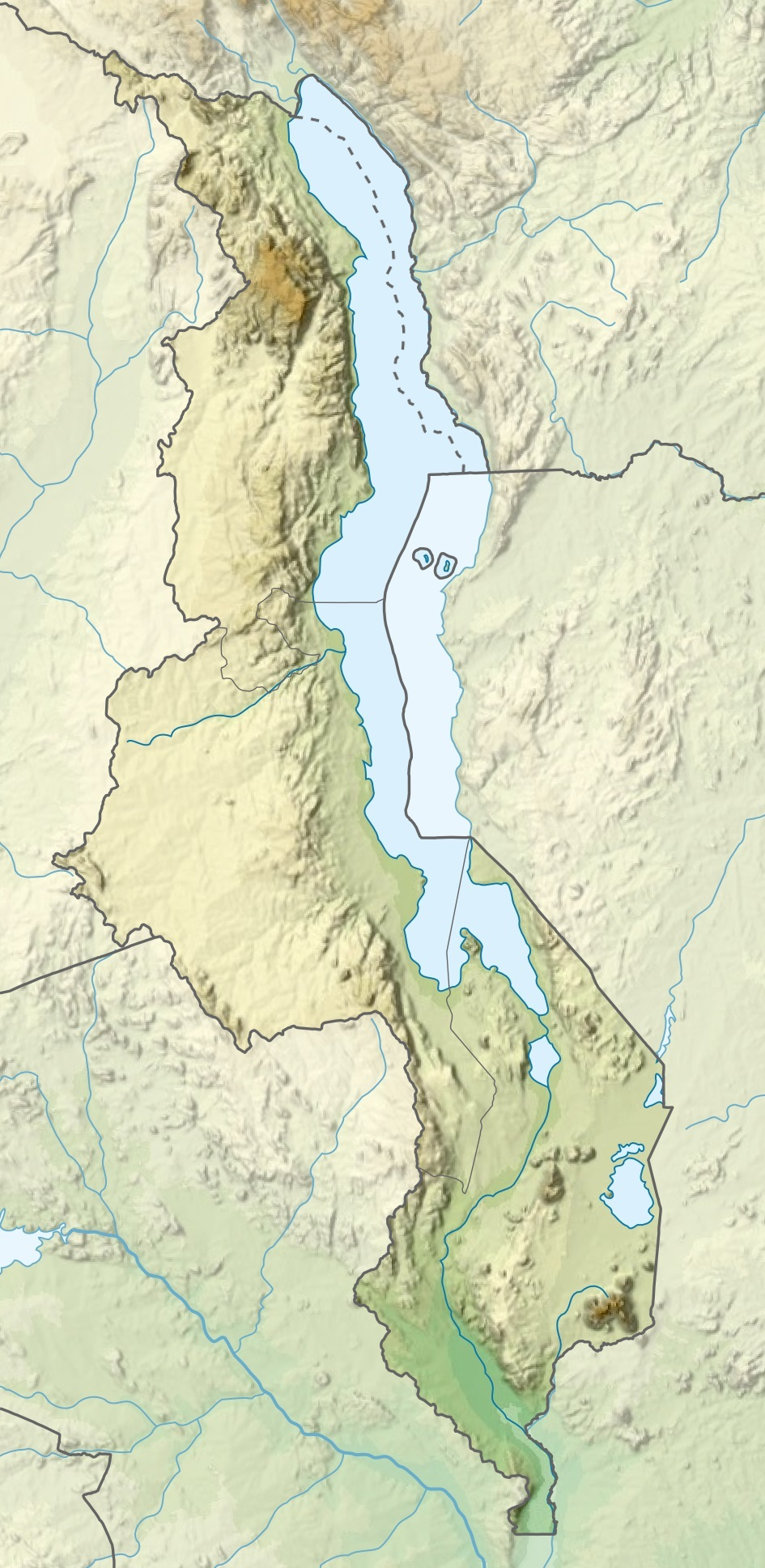
Fossiliferous stratigraphic units in Malawi
Chiwondo Formation
Dinosaur Beds
Chiweta Beds

This is a list of fossiliferous stratigraphic units in Malawi.

Group	Formation	Period	Notes
	Chiwondo Beds	Pliocene-Holocene	
Lupata Group	Dinosaur Beds	Aptian	
	Chiweta Beds	Wuchiapingian	

== See also ==
- Lists of fossiliferous stratigraphic units in Africa
  - List of fossiliferous stratigraphic units in Mozambique
  - List of fossiliferous stratigraphic units in Zambia
- Geology of Malawi
