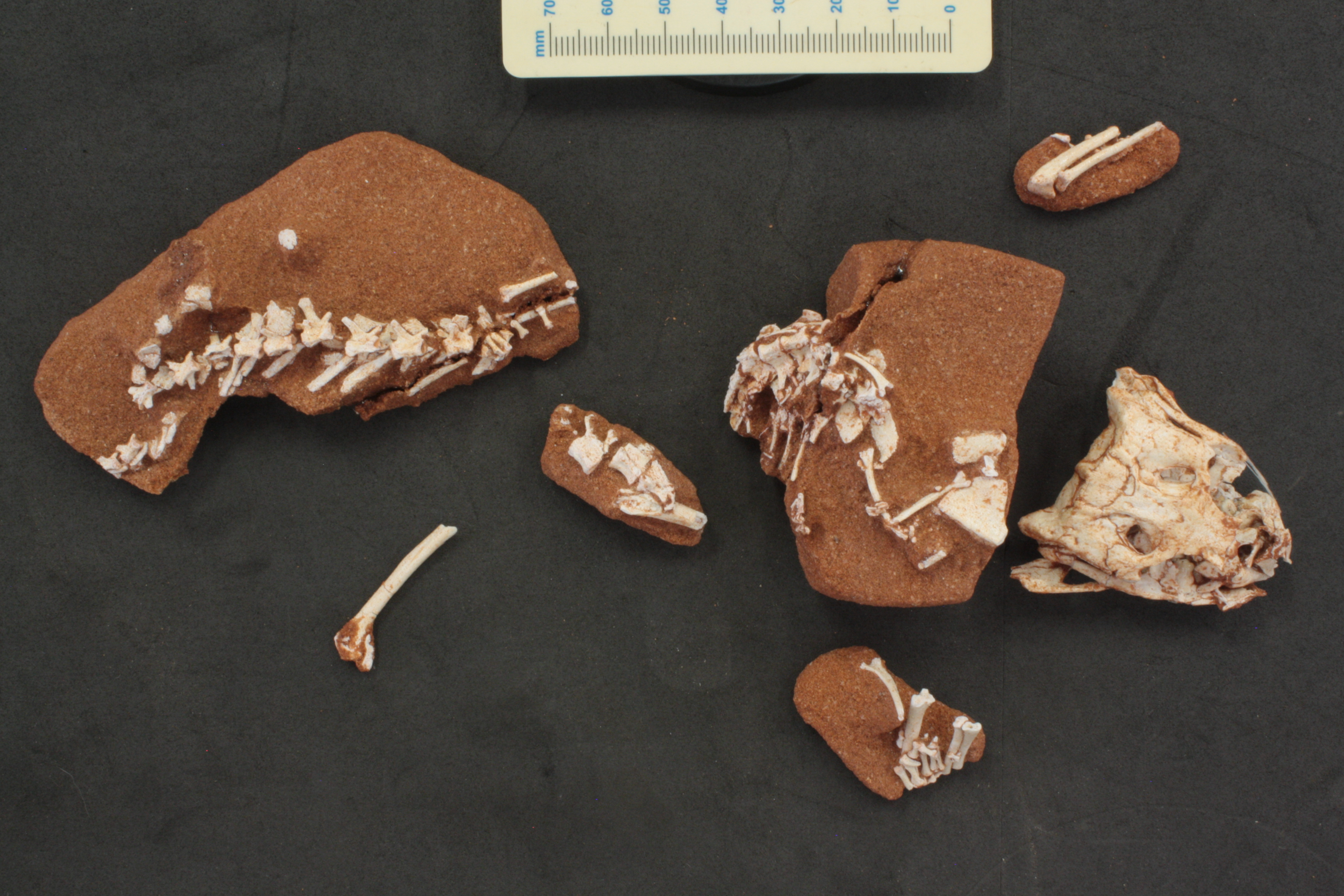
- Holotype specimen

Scientific classification
- Kingdom: Animalia
- Phylum: Chordata
- Class: Reptilia
- Clade: Pseudosuchia
- Clade: Crocodylomorpha
- Clade: †Notosuchia
- Family: †Candidodontidae
- Genus: †Thilastikosuchus de Carvalho et al., 2025
- Species: †T. scutorectangularis

Binomial name
- †Thilastikosuchus scutorectangularis de Carvalho et al., 2025

= Thilastikosuchus =

Thilastikosuchus Temporal range: Early Cretaceous Barremian–Aptian

Genus of extinct crocodylomorph

Thilastikosuchus is an extinct genus of candidodontid notosuchian from the Early Cretaceous Quiricó Formation of Brazil. It is regarded as the oldest known notosuchian from the country and possibly the oldest known notosuchian known from South America. Thilastikosuchus is most closely related to Lavocatchampsa, Pakasuchus and Malawisuchus. The genus is monotypic, only containing the species Thilastikosuchus scutorectangularis.

== History and naming ==
The genus Thilastikosuchus was described in 2025 on the basis of specimen FUP-Pv-000019, a well preserved articulated skeleton of a juvenile individual discovered in the Sanfranciscana Basin of Minas Gerais State, Brazil. The red sandstone where the fossil originates from is assigned to the Quiricó Formation and date to the Early Cretaceous, likely the Barremian to Aptian, making Thilastikosuchus one of the oldest known notosuchians of South America.

The name Thilastikosuchus is a combination of the Greek "Thilastikó" meaning mammal and the widely used suffix "suchus" which means crocodile, with the name referencing the very mammal-like dentition displayed by candidodontid notosuchians. The species name scutorectangularis meanwhile alludes to the fact that the osteoderm scutes that covered the animals back were rectangular.

== Description ==
=== Skull ===
The holotype specimen of Thilastikosuchus is missing important parts of the skull such as the premaxillae, lacrimals, much of the prefrontals, palpebrals and palatines, but what remains clearly shows that the back of its skull was rectangular and leading into a pointed snout, which would give the complete skull a somewhat triangular form when viewed from above. The animals profile would have been somewhat elliptical, with the top of the head being flat and the ventral margin arched. In addition to the missing material, the fact that the holotype specimen belongs to a juvenile also impacts its appearance in ways that do not reflect the adult morphology, notably in the size of the eyes relative to the head.

Given the absence of the premaxilla, most of the snout is preserved only through the maxilla, which forms an ascending and a ventrolateral process that frame the antorbital fenestra that sits between the maxilla and the missing lacrimal. The maxilla connects to the jugal, which forms the lower edge of the eyesocket, the inset postorbital bar and the lower edge of the triangular infratemporal fenestra. The paired nasals lie flat atop the head and what little remains of the prefrontals suggest that the rims of the orbits were slightly raised compared to the surface of the frontal bone. The frontal consists of an elongated process that contacts the nasals and prefrontals and a broader section that lies on the skull table where it reaches the elliptical supratemporal fossa. Within the fossa the frontal contacts the postorbital and the laterosphenoid and towards the center of the skull table it forms a V-shaped suture with the parietal bone. The postorbitals resemble inverted Ls and form the upper half of the postorbital bar. Rather than bearing a sagittal crest as in sphagesaurids, the skull table of Thilastikosuchus is characterized by the elongated posterior processes of the squamosal bones, which extend far beyond the occipital margin of the skull. The very back of the skull table prominently features a dorsally exposed supraoccipital bone, which is rectangular and effectively bars the parietal from reaching the back edge. This is similar to what is seen in Malawisuchus and noticeably more extensive than in Pakasuchus. The supraoccipital is overlapped by both the parietal and the squamosals where these elements meet, which makes this part of the bone appear depressed relative to the rest of the skull roof.

On the occipital face, the back of the head, the supraoccipital appears T-shaped due to the presence of a large vertical bulge. This bulge is bordered by depressions and the supraoccipital extends down into the space between the exoccipitals, though it does not reach the foramen magnum. The otoccipitals lie lateral to the supraoccipital on the occipital face, form most the foramen magnum and a small part of the occipital condyle, which is mostly formed by the basioccipital.

=== Dentition ===
The name-giving feature of Thilastikosuchus is the mammal-like heterodonty, meaning the jaws contained multiple different types of tooth morphologies rather than being uniform in shape like in modern crocodilians. Of the teeth of the upper jaw, only the seven maxillary teeth are known given the preservation of the holotype. The maxilla contains two types of teeth, subconical incisiforms and increasingly robust and blunt molariforms, while caniniforms are not known from this taxon. This feature is shared with Lavocatchampsa, but otherwise not seen in candidodontids, which are otherwise known to have possessed maxillary caniniforms. As for other heterodont notosuchians, some sphagesaurids also possessed caniniforms, though in their case they are frequently located in the premaxilla. The first two teeth of the maxilla are both incisiforms, one conical and one subconical in shape. Behind these begin the molariforms, which are more complex in shape featuring multiple cusps and cingula. The first molariform only possesses two cusps, with the one further to the front being higher, and a cingulum that is exclusively present on the labial side (facing the inside of the mouth). The molariforms also bear accessory cusps or denticles in addition to the main cusps, two of which are located labially on the cingulum and a third on the lingual side independent of the cingulum. Latter molariforms preserve three primary cusps, of which the central one is the most prominent, and cingula that extend across the labial and lingual side. The number of denticles varies, with the second molariform and the seventh and final tooth preserving three denticles total, arranged like in the first molariform (two labial and one lingual). The fifth and sixth teeth meanwhile, molariforms three and four respectively, preserve four accessory cusps, two labial and two lingual to the main cusps.

The molariforms of Thilastikosuchus are generally similar to those of other candidodontids and can easily be distinguished from the teeth of other heterodont notosuchians. For instance, the teeth of Simosuchus are easily recognized by their leaf-shaped appearance, those of sphagesaurids and Notosuchus are drop-shaped rather than oval in their transverse crosssection and the teeth of the enigmatic Chimaerasuchus preserve rows of tubercles not seen in candidodontids.

The dentary teeth work as a counter to those of the upper jaw and like the maxillary toothrow lack caniniforms. The eleven dentary teeth display the same heterodonty as those of the upper jaw, consisting of four conical to subconical incisiforms and six multicusped molariforms. The first incisiform is procumbent, meaning that it is oriented towards the front of the jaw rather than upwards. The first two molariforms have two cusps like the first maxillary molariform, with a higher mesio-labial cusp. A cingulum is absent in the first molariform, but present from the second molariform onward. In the latter, the cingulum bears 5 accessory cusps total, two labial and three lingual. The seventh dentary tooth, which is the third molariform, bears three main cusps and six accessory cusps, three labially and three lingually. Teeth eight to ten are described as multicusped, with the last standing out as bearing a crest-shaped cusp and lacking denticles.

The holotype also reveals several replacement teeth visible via computer tomography.

=== Osteoderms ===
The osteoderm armor of Thilastikosuchus consists of two parasagittal rows that run down the animals spine, with each pair overlapping the front-most edge of the following pair and the individual plates exhibiting two different morphologies dependant on their position. The dorsal osteoderms, which are positioned above the animals torso, are rectangular in shape and give Thilastikosuchus scutorectangularis its name. The front, back and inner edges are all straight, with the latter indicating that the two rows did not just run parallel to each other but actually connect with each other above the spine. The outer edges meanwhile are gently curved and bear a small projection that faces backwards. A small sagittal crest can also be seen on the dorsal osteoderms, though it is shifted towards the outer edge.

Further back along the body the dorsal osteoderms transition into the caudal osteoderms of the tail, which are distinct in their shape. Unlike the wider than long dorsal osteoderms, those of the tail are square with straight outer edges and a pronounced crest that effectively splits each plate in two.

Overall the osteoderms of Thilastikosuchus are compared to those of protosuchians and gobiosuchids, early branches of crocodylomorpha that display the same rectangular osteoderm morphology and the displaced sagittal crests, though the articulation between the individual plates is noticeably simpler in Thilastikosuchus. This coupled with the basal position recovered for candidodontids might suggest that the rectangular osteoderms with displaced keels could be the ancestral condition for notosuchians. Some uruguaysuchids and peirosaurs also preserve rectangular osteoderms, though in animals such as Araripesuchus they are still not as wide as they are in Thilastikosuchus nor are the crests displaced as far laterally.

== Phylogeny ==
In the phylogenetic analysis of de Carvalho and colleagues the Candidodontidae are recovered as a monophyletic family at the very base of Notosuchia, making them the earliest diverging group of this widespread clade. Internally, the earliest diverging member of Candidodontidae is Candidodon itself, after which the family splits into two distinct branches. One contains Malawisuchus and Pakasuchus, whereas the other is formed by Thilastikosuchus and its sister taxon Lavocatchampsa.

- Notosuchia
  - Candidodontidae
    - Candidodon
    - - - Malawisuchus
        - Pakasuchus
      - - Lavocatchampsa
        - Thilastikosuchus
  - - - Uruguaysuchidae
      - Peirosauridae
    - Ziphosuchia
