= Quiricó Formation =

Geological formation in Brazil

- Stratigraphic range: Aptian, ~125 Ma
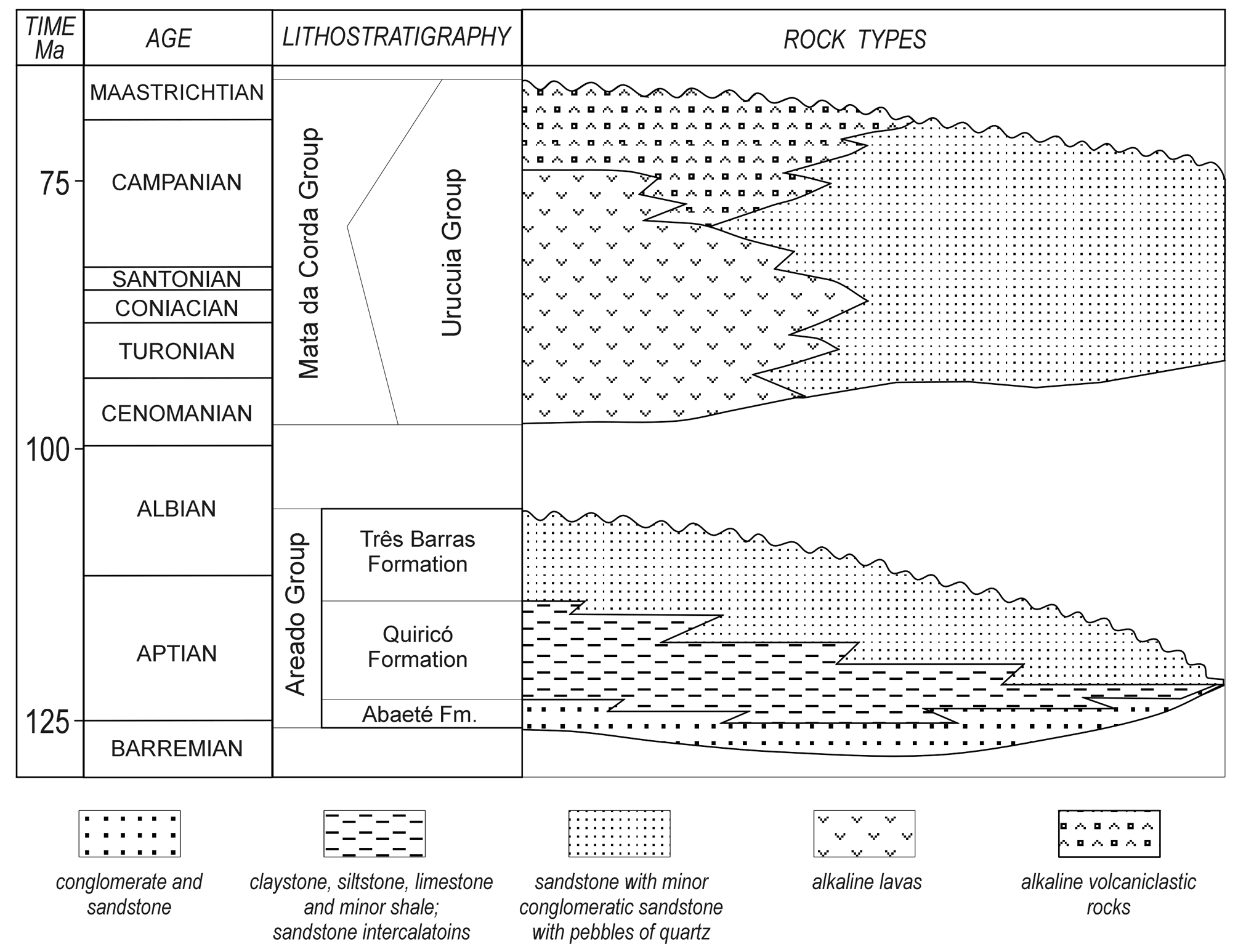
- Stratigraphic position of the Quiricó Formation in São Francisco Basin
- Type: Geological formation
- Unit of: Areado Group
- Underlies: Abaeté Formation
- Overlies: Três Barras Formation
- Thickness: 60–100 m (200–330 ft)

Lithology
- Primary: Sandstone, claystone
- Other: Siltstone, limestone

Location
- Coordinates: 16.7°S 44.4°W
- Approximate paleocoordinates: 17.5°S 11.9°W
- Region: Minas Gerais
- Country: Brazil
- Extent: São Francisco Basin

Type section
- Named for: Quiricó Lake/River
- Named by: Barbosa
- Year defined: 1965
- Quiricó Formation (Brazil)

The Quiricó Formation is a geological formation of the Areado Group in Minas Gerais, Brazil whose strata date back to the Early Cretaceous (Aptian). Many occurrences of fossils are reported in the lacustrine deposits of the Quiricó Formation.

== Fossil content ==
Color key: Taxon / Reclassified taxon / Taxon falsely reported as present / Dubious taxon or junior synonym / Ichnotaxon / Ootaxon / Morphotaxon	Notes; Uncertain or tentative taxa are in small text; ~~crossed out~~ taxa are discredited.

=== Dinosaurs ===
==== Sauropods ====
Sauropods of the Quiricó Formation
Genus	Species	Location	Stratigraphic position	Material	Notes	Images
Rebbachisauridae indet.	Indeterminate			Vertebral fragments.		
Tapuiasaurus	T. macedoi			Partial articulated specimen including complete skull.	A titanosaurian sauropod.	

==== Theropoda ====
Theropods of the Quiricó Formation
Genus	Species	Location	Stratigraphic position	Material	Notes	Images
Abelisauridae indet.	Indeterminate			Isolated teeth.		
Carcharodontosauridae indet.	Indeterminate			Isolated tooth.		
Noasauridae indet.	Indeterminate			Partial right hindlimb.	Undescribed.	
Spectrovenator	S. ragei			Partially articulated specimen including complete skull.	An abelisaurid theropod.	

=== Pterosaurs ===
Pterosaurs of the Quiricó Formation
Genus	Species	Location	Stratigraphic position	Material	Notes	Images
Ornithocheiromorpha indet.	Indeterminate	Municipality of Presidente Olegário		An isolated tooth.	Probably a member of ornithocheiriformes.	

=== Crocodylomorphs ===
Crocodylomorphs of the Quiricó Formation
Genus	Species	Location	Stratigraphic position	Material	Notes	Images
Thilastikosuchus	T. scutorectangularis			Articulated skull and partially articulated specimen.	A candidodontid notosuchian.	

=== Squamates ===
Squamates of the Quiricó Formation
Genus	Species	Location	Stratigraphic position	Material	Notes	Images
Cryptobicuspidon	C. pachysymphysealis			Partial dentaries.	A polyglyphanodontid lizard.	
Neokotus	N. sanfranciscanus			Partial skeleton including skull elements.	A paramacellodid lizard.	

=== Crustaceans ===
Crustaceans of the Quiricó Formation
Genus	Species	Location	Stratigraphic position	Material	Notes	Images
Alicenula	A. longiformis				A ostracod.	
Penthesilenula	P. pintoi				A ostracod.	
Platyestheria	P. abaetensis				A clam shrimp.	
Timiriasevia	T. sanfranciscanensis				A ostracod.	

=== Fish ===
Fishes of the Quiricó Formation
Genus	Species	Location	Stratigraphic position	Material	Notes	Images
Amiidae Indet.	Ineterminate					
Aspidorhynchidae Indet.	Indeterminate					
Francischanos	F. moraesi				A chanid fish.	
Laeliichthys	L. ancentralis				An osteoglossomorph fish.	
Dipnoi Indet.	Indeterminate					
Hybodontiformes Indet.	Indeterminate					
Lepisosteidae Indet.	Indeterminate					
Mawsonia	M. gigas				A mawsoniid coelacanth	
Semionotiformes Indet.	Indeterminate					
Tribodus	T. sp.				A hybodont	
Lonchidionoides	L.sp.			9 isolated teeth	A hybodont	
