= Tiamat valdecii =

Tiamat valdecii Temporal range: 'mid'-Cretaceous, Albian–Cenomanian
- Skeletal reconstruction

Scientific classification
- Kingdom: Animalia
- Phylum: Chordata
- Class: Reptilia
- Clade: Dinosauria
- Clade: Saurischia
- Clade: †Sauropodomorpha
- Clade: †Sauropoda
- Clade: †Macronaria
- Clade: †Titanosauria
- Genus: †Tiamat; Pereira et al., 2024
- Species: †T. valdecii

Binomial name
- †Tiamat valdecii Pereira et al., 2024

Genus of titanosaurian dinosaurs

Tiamat (after the Mesopotamian mythical goddess) is an extinct genus of titanosaurian sauropod dinosaur from the 'mid'-Cretaceous Açu Formation of Brazil. The genus contains a single species, T. valdecii, known from several caudal vertebrae.

== Discovery and naming ==
The Tiamat holotype specimen was discovered in sediments of the Açu Formation in the Potiguar Basin of Ceará state, Brazil. The specimen consists of nine fragmentary caudal vertebrae from the beginning and middle of the tail, deposited in the Federal University of Rio de Janeiro. An isolated titanosaur osteoderm described in 2018, specimen UFRJ-DG 549-R, was tentatively suggested to also have come from Tiamat.

In 2024, Pereira et al. described Tiamat valdecii as a new genus and species of basal titanosaur based on these fossil remains. The generic name, Tiamat, references Tiamat—the serpentine or draconic goddess of Sumerian and Babylonian mythology—who traditionally represents the mother of mythical beings, hinting at the basal phylogenetic position of the dinosaur. The specific name, valdecii, honors Dr. Valdeci dos Santos Júnior, the discoverer of the type locality.

Tiamat represents the first dinosaur to be named from the Potiguar Basin of Brazil, although the indeterminate remains of other dinosaurs have been found.

== Classification ==
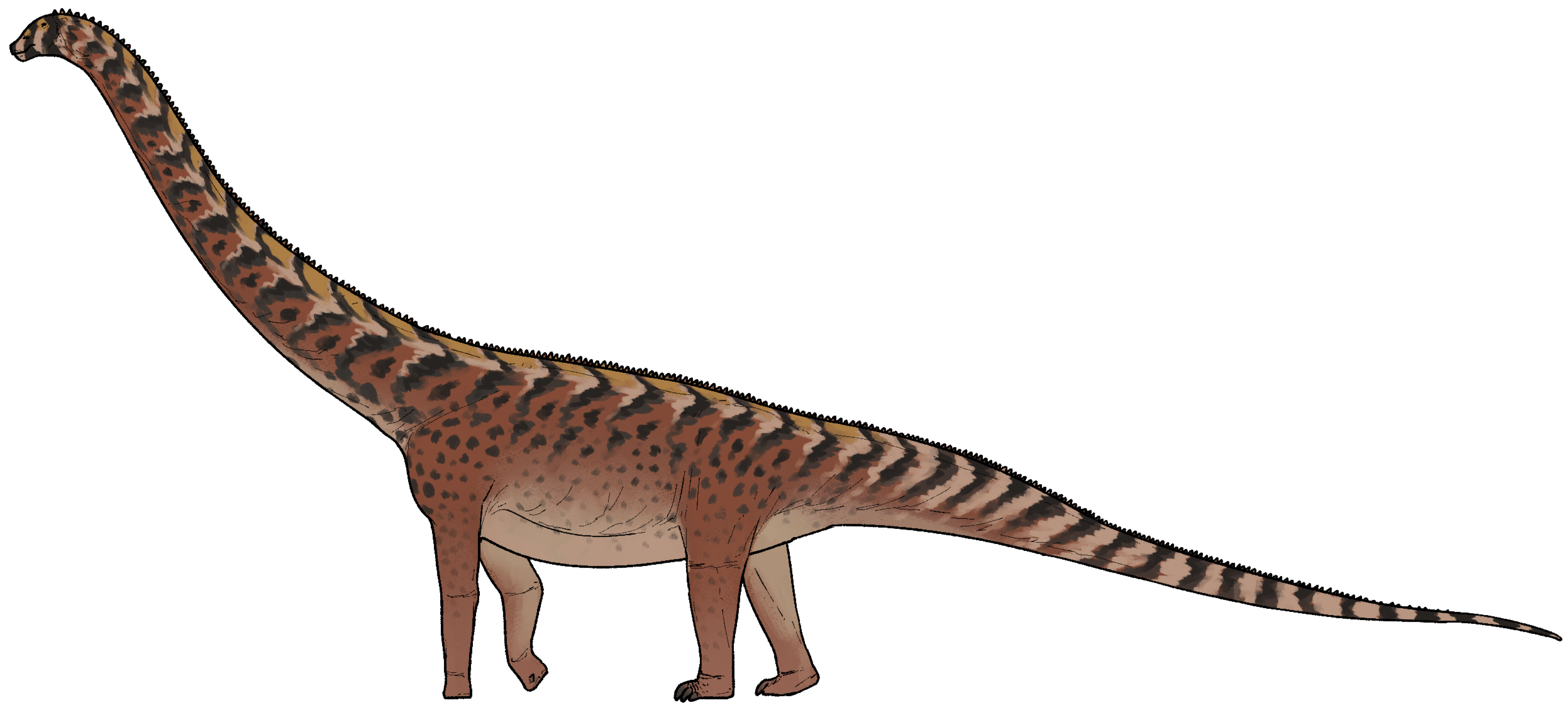
Life restoration

In their phylogenetic analyses, Pereira (2024) recovered Tiamat as a basal titanosaur, as the sister taxon to the similarly aged Andesaurus. Their results are displayed in the cladogram below:

- Titanosauria
  - Wintonotitan
  - - Tiamat
    - Andesaurus
  - - Kaijutitan
    - Lithostrotia
      - Malawisaurus
      - - Tapuiasaurus
        - - - Dreadnoughtus
            - Saltasauroidea
          - - BIBE 45854 (cervical vertebrae referred to Alamosaurus)
            - Futalognkosaurus
            - - Puertasaurus
              - Notocolossus
            - - Austroposeidon
              - Mendozasaurus
            - - - Bonitasaura
                - - Argentinosaurus
                  - Patagotitan
              - - Epachthosaurus
                - Rinconsauria
