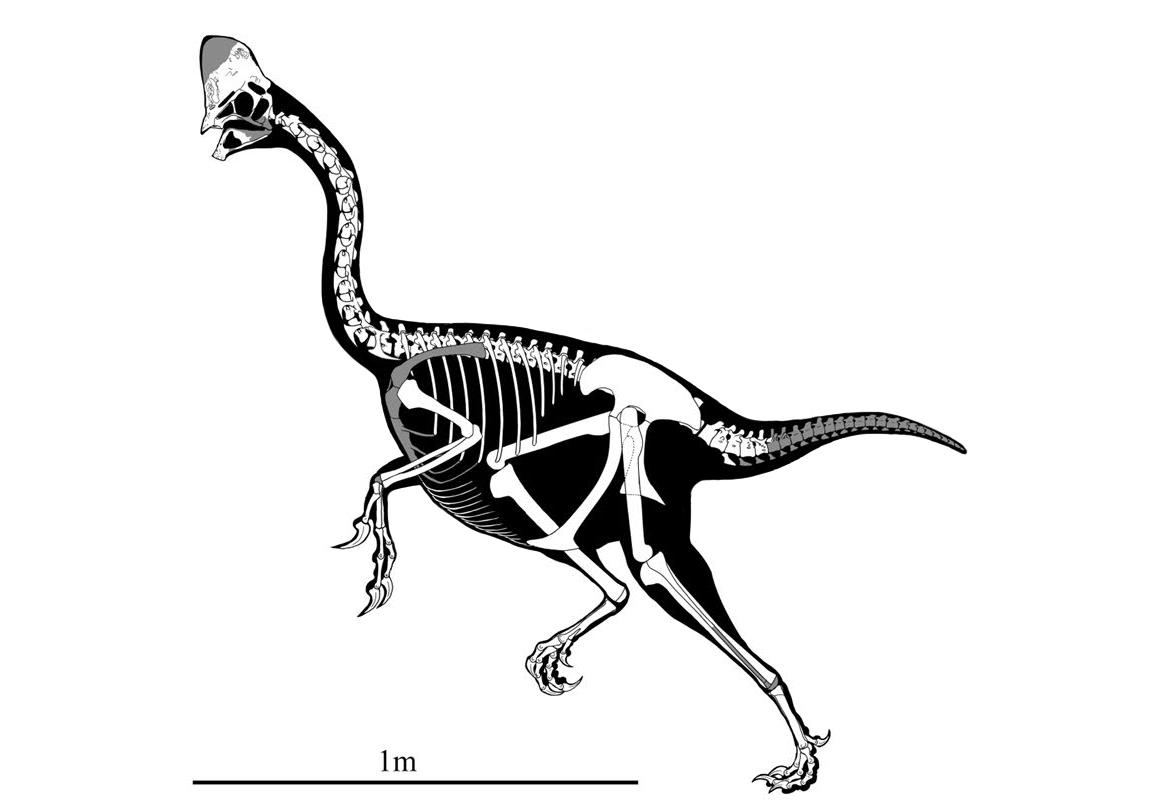
- Holotype skeletal reconstruction

Scientific classification
- Kingdom: Animalia
- Phylum: Chordata
- Class: Reptilia
- Clade: Dinosauria
- Clade: Saurischia
- Clade: Theropoda
- Family: †Oviraptoridae
- Subfamily: †Oviraptorinae
- Genus: †Corythoraptor; Lü et al., 2017

Type species
- Corythoraptor jacobsi Lü et al., 2017

= Corythoraptor =

Corythoraptor Temporal range: Late Cretaceous, ~67–66 Ma

Extinct genus of dinosaurs

Corythoraptor (lit. 'helmeted thief') is a genus of oviraptorid dinosaur from the late Maastrichtian Nanxiong Formation of South China. It contains one species, C. jacobsi, known from a single well-preserved skeleton, and named after paleontologist Louis L. Jacobs. It bears a tall crest similar to that of the modern cassowary, and possibly had a similar functionality of display and resonance to detect lower-frequency sounds.

Like other oviraptorids, the bones of Corythoraptor were heavily pneumatized with many air pockets. Microanalysis of the bones indicates seasonal growth spurts, and the type specimen probably died at the age of 6 or 7, meaning growth continued into at least the 8th year of development. The type specimen reached 1.6 m (5 ft 3 in) in length. Oviraptorids may have predominantly inhabited arid environments and ate xerophytic (drought-resistant) plants, nuts, and seeds. However, Corythoraptor coexisted with six other oviraptorid genera, and they may have all eaten different foods (niche partitioning).

== Discovery ==
Corythoraptor was described by Chinese paleontologist Lü Junchang and colleagues in 2017. The holotype, JPM-2015-001, is a nearly complete skeleton of an individual at least seven or eight years old, lacking distal caudal vertebrae but including the skull and lower jaw (JPM-2015-001). It is one of better preserved oviraptorosaurian specimens known so far. It was discovered in the Late Cretaceous Nanxiong Formation near the Ganzhou Railway Station in Ganzhou, Jiangxi, in South China. The specimen is now kept at the Jinzhou Paleontological Museum in Jinzhou, Liaoning Province. It was not in a typical death pose, and the neck was in a circular curl much like the type specimen for the contemporary oviraptorid Heyuannia. What caused this is unclear.

The name Corythoraptor is in reference to the distinct crest on its head. The species name jacobsi honors American vertebrate paleontologist Louis L. Jacobs who mentored three of the authors while they were getting their PhD's at Southern Methodist University, Dallas, Texas.

== Description ==
=== Skull ===
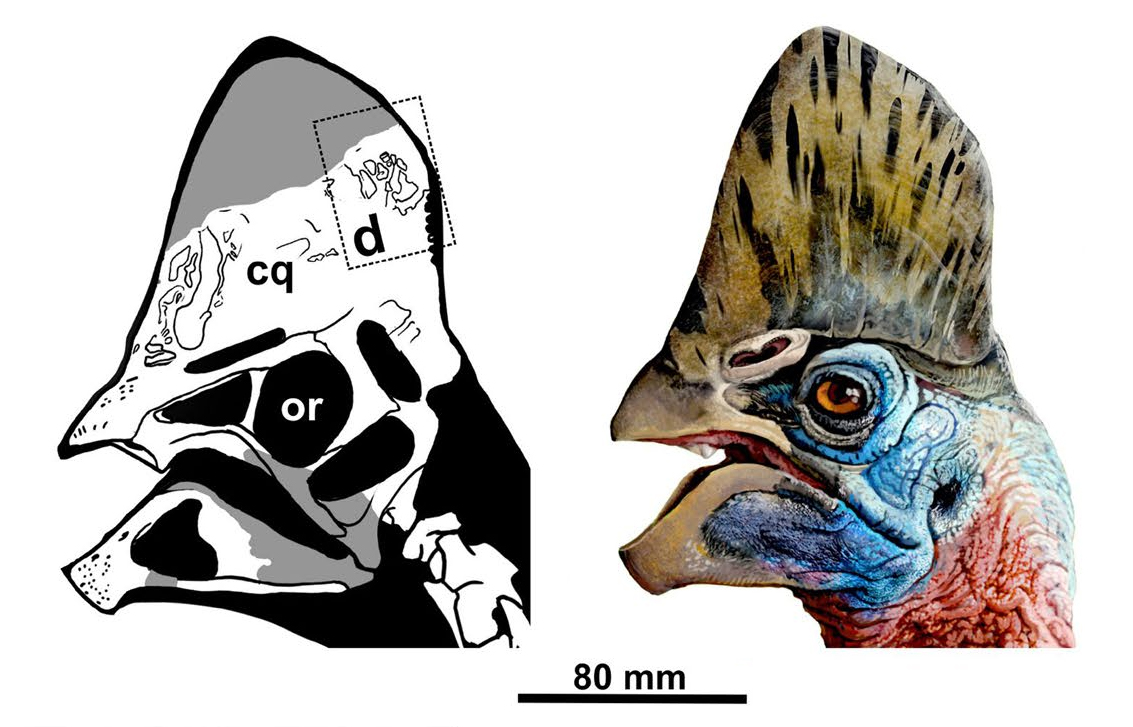
Skull reconstruction (left) and head restoration (right)

Corythoraptor bore a tall crest on its head similar to that of the modern cassowary, with a 2 mm (0.079 in) thick perhaps keratinous bony shell casing. The crest is pneumatized and features several chambers separated by thin bony walls, though the crest of Corythoraptor is more pneumatized than that of the cassowary. This may have made the crest quite pliable, incapable of withstanding concussive force such as during head butting.

Corythoraptor had a relatively large eyesocket. The nasal bones seem to be highly pneumatized. The lower part of the premaxillae (at the tip of the snout) features several irregularly distributed pits, which probably represent foramina which allowed blood vessels to flow, indicating a keratinous sheath (rhamphotheca) over a beak similar to ornithomimids. The ventral side (underside) of the premaxillae is highly broken up, which could indicate the bone was lightweight, perhaps being pneumatized. Corythoraptor was toothless.

=== Postcranial skeleton ===
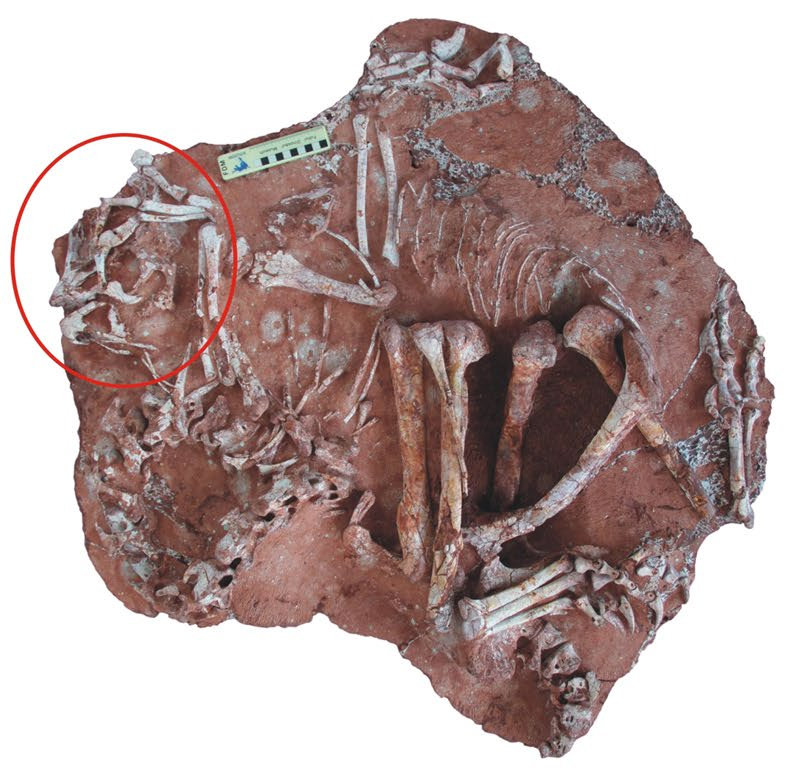
Holotype block

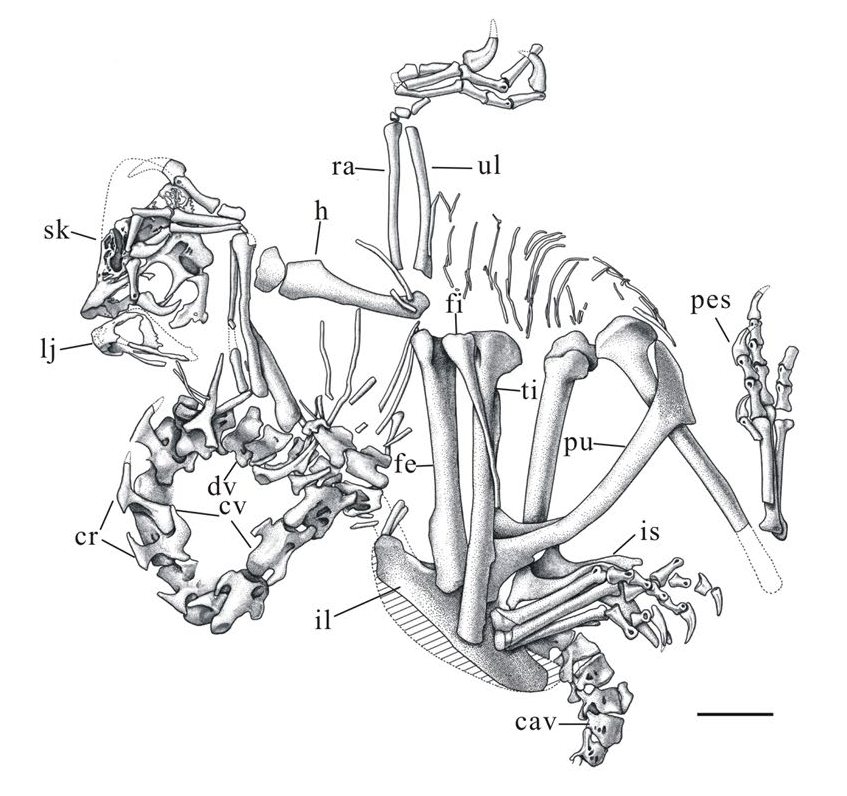
Line diagram of the block

Corythoraptor has 12 neck vertebrae. The 6th and 11th vertebrae are the longest. There is a pleurocoel (an air pocket) on the 5th through 12th vertebrae located on the middle of each vertebra. The pleurocoel is nearly circular on the 5th vertebra, diameter 4.8 mm (0.19 in), and ovular on the 6th, length 5 mm (0.20 in). The articular surface (where a vertebra contacts another vertebra) on the anterior (headward) side is strongly concave, and the posterior (tailward) articular surface is moderately convex. The anterior articular surfaces are almost square and are wider than the posterior articular surfaces. The ribs are fused to the vertebrae. The neural arches (which project outwards from the vertebrae) are densely pneumatized with several small air chambers.

It is unclear how many dorsal vertebrae Corythoraptor had because the specimen only preserves the first 6 vertebrae. The dorsal vertebrae are shorter than the neck vertebrae, but the 2nd and 3rd dorsal vertebrae have larger pleurocoels. The anterior articular surface is slightly concave, and the posterior articular surface nearly flat. Only the last 2 sacral vertebrae are preserved, and each are smooth, round, and bear a small pleurocoel. The rib of the last sacral vertebra is stout and touches the postacetabular process on the ilium of the pelvis. The first 5 tail vertebrae are preserved, of which the first 3 are complete. Both articular surfaces are flat. The pleurocoels are small and long on the first 2 vertebrae, and somewhat larger on the remaining. Like Nankangia, there are 3 fossae (depressions) on the vertebrae except for the first one: the infraprezygapophyseal fossa on the anterior side near the junction of the prezygapophysis (which locks two vertebrae together) and the transverse process (which juts out diagonally from the vertebra); the infradiapophyseal fossa at the base of the transverse process; and the pleurocoel. The neural arches are similar to those of Nankangia.

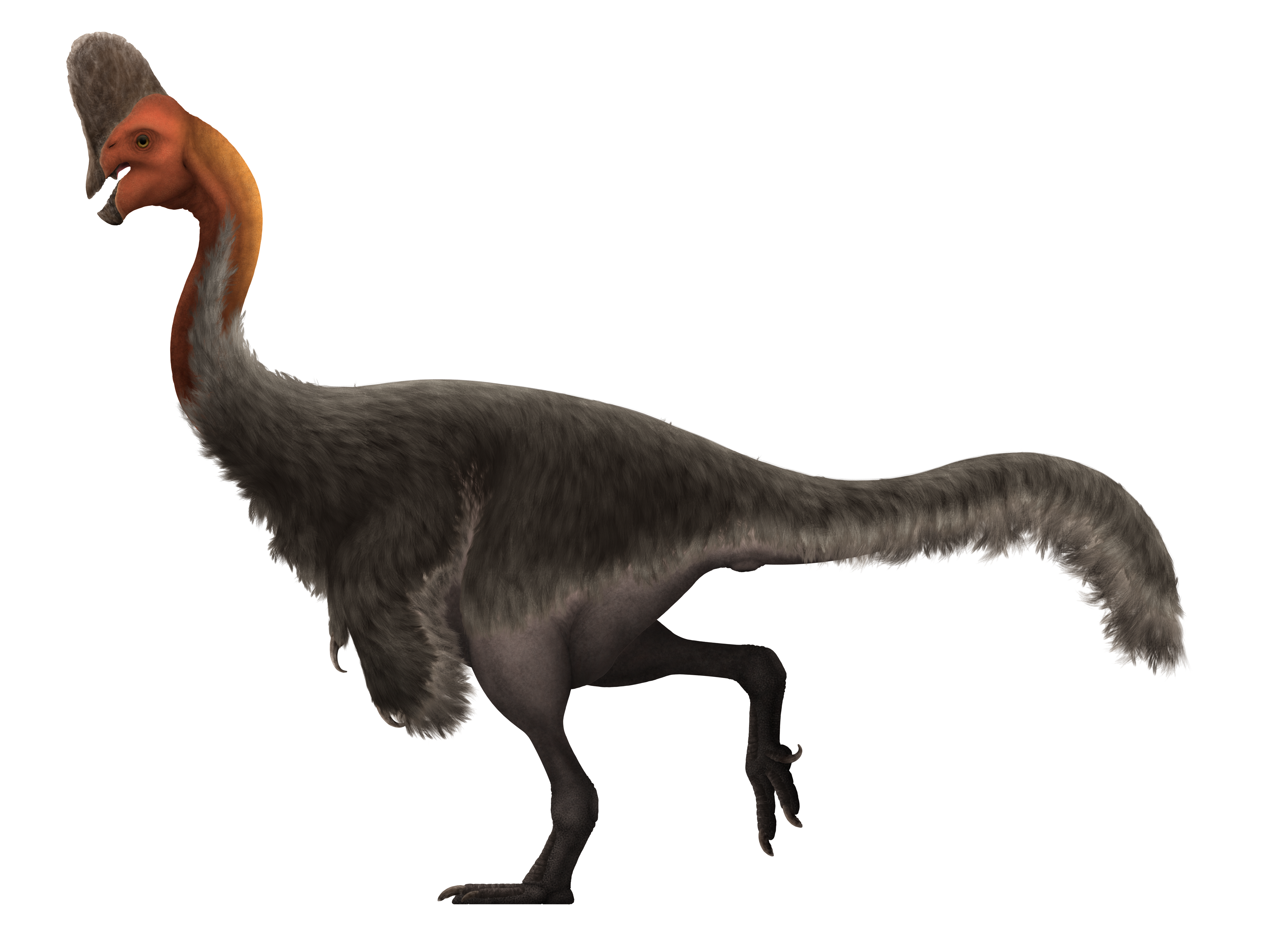
Life restoration

The left humerus is almost completely preserved, and makes up about 27% of the entire length of the arm, and 48% excluding the hand. Like other oviraptorids, the humerus is weakly twisted. The deltopectoral crest near the shoulder is short and runs across 31% of the humerus. The distal end is expanded and bears a well developed condyle (which forms the elbow joint). The ulna is slightly shorter than the humerus and makes up 26% of the entire arm length including the hand, and features a poorly developed olecranon (which also forms the elbow joint). The radius is slightly shorter and narrower than the ulna, and is curved cranially which causes a gap between the radius and the ulna much like in Heyuannia. The proximal end of the metacarpals (at the wrist) are closely squeezed together. The first metacarpal bone (the thumb) is the shortest and is slightly concave on the underside. The second metacarpal bone is 41% longer than the first, and is moderately robust with the shaft diameter being 13% of the total length. The third metacarpal bone is the same length as the second but 68% narrower. The phalanges (finger bones) are long and robust, the longest being the first phalanx about 72% longer than the second metacarpal, and the third phalanx is the smallest. The unguals (claws) are weakly curved, and decrease in size and curvature from first to third finger.

Corythoraptor, being a saurischian, had a saurischian hip. Like other late oviraptorids (except Nomingia), the pubis bone is concave cranially. Like other oviraptorids, the obturator process is midway on the shaft of the ischium and is triangular. The femur is longer than the ilium and makes up 30% of the total leg length including the foot. The greater trochanter on the head of the femur is massive, and the lesser trochanter may have fused with it. There is a rough 41 mm × 15 mm (1.61 in × 0.59 in) muscular scar where the fourth trochanter is expected to be, similar to Citipati and Khaan. The tibia is 19% longer than the femur, and features a pronounced cnemial crest running along half of its length. The foot is 29% the length of the leg. Like other theropods, the phalangeal formula (the number of phalanges per digit) is 2-3-4-5. The 3rd digit is the longest, and the 4th is slightly longer than the 2nd. The toe claws are moderately curved.

== Classification ==
Corythoraptor is an oviraptorid, and phylogenetic analysis recovers it in a clade with Huanansaurus, and closely related to Citipati, the Zamyn Khondt oviraptorid, Rinchenia, and Oviraptor. There was a high oviraptorid diversity in the Late Cretaceous of South China, with representatives of three different oviraptorid clades. Below is a family tree of Oviraptoridae based on Lü et al., 2017 (bolded species inhabited South China):

- Oviraptoridae
  - - **Nankangia jiangxiensis**
    - - Yulong mini
      - Nomingia gobiensis
  - - Oviraptor philoceratops
    - - Rinchenia mongoliensis
      - - Zamyn Khondt oviraptorid
        - - Citipati osmolskae
          - - **Corythoraptor jacobsi**
            - **Huanansaurus ganzhouensis**
    - - - **Tongtianlong limosus**
        - - Wulatelong gobiensis
          - **Banji long**
      - - **Shixinggia oblita**
        - - Khaan mckennai
          - - Conchoraptor gracilis
            - - Machairasaurus leptonychus
              - - **Jiangxisaurus ganzhouensis**
                - - **Ganzhousaurus nankangensis**
                  - - Nemegtomaia barsboldi
                    - - "Ingenia" yanshini
                      - **Heyuannia huangi**

The validity of Corythoraptor was called into question by Cau (2024), who considered it to be a junior synonym of the contemporary Banji due to them both sharing unique characteristics of the skull. He further explained that the proposed diagnosis distinguishing the taxa was based on ontogenetically variable characters. As such, Corythoraptor would represent a more mature individual of Banji. In 2026, Hao and Xu considered Corythoraptor as a junior synonym of Huanansaurus instead.

== Paleobiology ==
=== Diet ===
The jaw structure of oviraptorids is similar to those of herbivorous dicynodonts, parrots, and tortoises; oviraptorids are usually quite abundant which is typical of an herbivore; and Caudipteryx was found with gastroliths (stomach stones) which some herbivores use to aid in digesting tough plant matter, which all may indicate oviraptorids were omnivorous. It is unclear what plants they ate because the paleofloral assemblages of Late Cretaceous China is poorly known, which suggestions for xerophytic (drought-resistant) plants as oviraptorids are typically found in arid environments, as well as nuts and seeds. It has also been proposed they ate shellfish, but the jaws do not appear to have been well-equipped to crush shells, and the arid environment probably did not sustain a high enough shellfish population.

Because six different oviraptorid species are known from Ganzhou, they may have exhibited niche partitioning, with different species targeting different foods.

=== Ontogeny ===
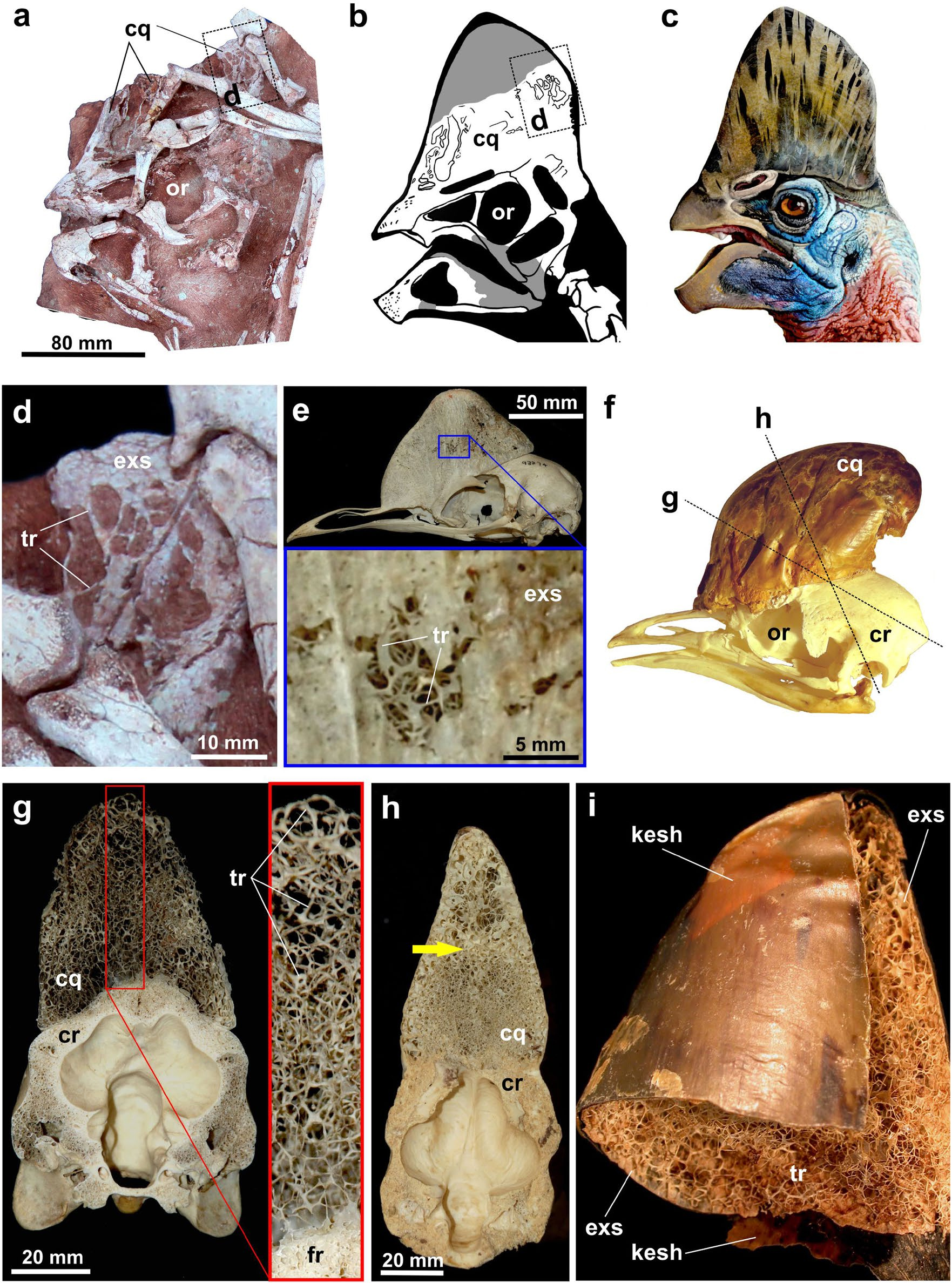
Comparison between the casque of Corythoraptor and the southern and northern cassowaries

Based on histological analysis on a portion of the fibula and radius, the growth marks indicate the holotype was older than 6 or 7 years when it died. A portion of the radius bears 3 distinct dark bands which indicate periods of arrested growth, which points to seasonal growth spurts. Because growth restarted near the edge of the bone, the specimen probably died at the beginning of a new growing season and therefore was still a young adult which had not yet reached its maximum size. If the crest did serve as a mating display, this would suggest Corythoraptor was sexually active before it finished growing, and that growth continued for more than 8 years. At this point in its development, Corythoraptor reached about 1.6 m (5 ft 3 in) in length, which is medium-sized for an oviraptorid.

=== Function of crest ===
The crest of Corythoraptor is apparently quite similar to the casque of the modern cassowary. The cassowary uses its casque to dissipate heat from the brain cavity, and as an resonator to aid in the detection or gauge the point of origin of low frequency signals across a greater distance. In Corythoraptor, the latter may have been used to hear predators or prey items, or possibly to pick up low frequency mating calls as modern cassowaries do. However, it is unclear if Corythoraptor was capable of producing low frequencies since these are produced in the throat. It is also possible the crests were used for display, with larger and more ornamented casques equating to higher ranking in the group hierarchy or better fitness during mating season, but cassowary casques do not vary very much between individuals. The cassowary-like crest, neck, and sharp claw may indicate Corythoraptor had a cassowary-like lifestyle.

== Paleoenvironment ==
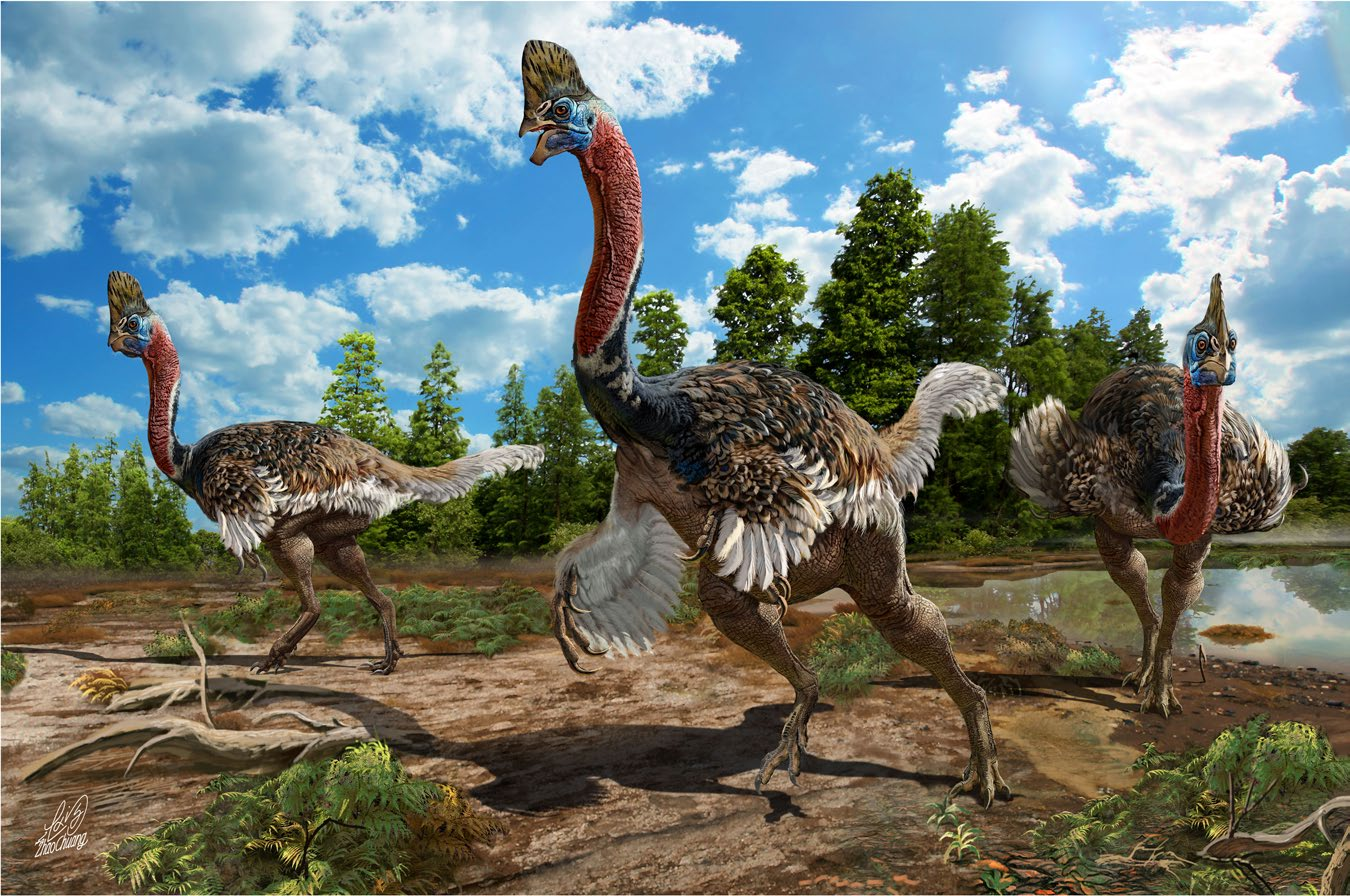
Group of Corythoraptor in the Late Cretaceous settings of the Nanxiong Formation

Ganzhou is well renowned for its oviraptorid diversity, yielding oviraptorid egg clutches, skeletons, and six other genera: Banji, Jiangxisaurus, Nankangia, Ganzhousaurus, Huanansaurus, and Tongtianlong. The assemblage forms a distinct province, the "Ganzhou Dinosaurian Fauna". Other dinosaurs include the therizinosaurid Nanshiungosaurus, the tyrannosaurid Qianzhousaurus, the sauropods Gannansaurus, and Jiangxititan, and the hadrosaurid Microhadrosaurus. Hadrosaurids are conspicuously rare. However, fossil trackways from the nearby Yangmeikeng area indicate an assemblage of predominantly ornithopods (hadrosaurids), but also nodosaurids, therizinosaurids, tyrannosaurids, oviraptorids, coelurosaurians, deinonychosaurians, the bird Wupus, sauropods (perhaps Gannansaurus), pterosaurs (Pteraichnus), and turtles (perhaps Jiangxichelys). The area was probably a lakeside environment.

== See also ==
- Timeline of oviraptorosaur research
- 2017 in archosaur paleontology
