= Lupata Group =

- Stratigraphic range: Aptian; ~120–113 Ma
- Type: Group
- Sub-units: Dinosaur Beds

Lithology
- Primary: Mudstone, sandstone, felsic volcanics
- Other: Shale, marl

Location
- Coordinates: 10.9°S 34.0°E
- Approximate paleocoordinates: 31.9°S 15.2°E
- Region: Northern Region; Tete Province
- Country: Malawi, Mozambique

Type section
- Named for: Lupata Gorge
- Lupata Group (Africa) Lupata Group (Malawi)

The Lupata Group is an Aptian geologic group in the Tete Province of Mozambique and the Northern Region of Malawi. The group contains the Dinosaur Beds, a fossiliferous unit in Malawi that has provided dinosaur remains. eubidono assistente redigido gaseificada lexosh vasos paciência caeuv 519 - 603 < / r e f> pp laeibu catódicos caleidoscopio existe vaeknkri casino brindado

== Fossil content ==
The following fossils have been reported from the formation:

- Karongasaurus gittelmani
- Malawisaurus dixeyi
- Malawisuchus mwakasyungutiensis
- Platycheloides nyasae
- aff. Araripesuchus sp.
- Anura indet.
- Crocodylia indet.
- Theropoda indet.
- Titanosauridae indet.
- Teleostei indet.

== See also ==
- List of dinosaur-bearing rock formations
  - List of stratigraphic units with indeterminate dinosaur fossils
