= Lone Star Dinosaurs =

1995 book by Louis L. Jacobs

- Cover for Lone Star Dinosaurs
- Author: Louis L. Jacobs
- Illustrator: Karen Carr
- Genre: Non-fiction
- Publisher: Ivan R. Dee
- Publication date: 1995
- Media type: Print (Hardcover & paperback)
- ISBN: 0-613-28934-X

Lone Star Dinosaurs is a book written by Louis L. Jacobs and published in 1995. It concerns the history of dinosaurs in Texas and the people who found their remains. Most of the dinosaurs in the book are from the Cretaceous age and a few of the dinosaurs include Pleurocoelus, Alamosaurus, Tenontosaurus, Tyrannosaurus rex, and the pterosaur Quetzalcoatlus. The stories within the book were compiled directly from the people who found the fossils.

The book's subject material was used as the basis for an exhibit opened on November 3, 1995, at the Fort Worth Museum of Science and History. The exhibit included paintings, bones exhumed from Texas, and interactive video components. Subsequent versions of the exhibit were also shown at other museums throughout the following year.

== Content ==
The book begins by discussing the history of paleontology in Texas and several of the more renowned academic researchers in the field, including Robert T. Hill, and the various types of dinosaurs discovered in the Texas strata, along with a more general look at paleontological finds around the world. This chapter is followed by three others that each focus on a different period of evolutionary history for Texas dinosaurs. A feature of the book are the stories of how each species' fossil was discovered by non-scientists visiting each region, with an often noted discovery involving a 7-year-old boy in 1988 finding an exposed Tenontosaurus skull alongside a riverbank.

The first chapter looks into the late Triassic period where early forms of well known dinosaur species were just beginning to evolve and whose fossils were uncovered in the Texas Dockum Formation. The second history chapter covers the middle Cretaceous period that had fossils found in the Paluxy Formation, the Glen Rose Formation, and the Twin Mountains Formation. Lastly, the third and final chapter covering the history of Texas fossil discoveries moves to the late Cretaceous and the more reptilian finds at the Aguja Formation and the Javelina Formation.

== Style and tone ==
For The Quarterly Review of Biology, Edwin H. Colbert notes the "felicitous prose style" of the book that has "excellent descriptions" that are "abundant illustrated by the very skillful and imaginative paintings of Karen Carr". Robert Burnham for Earth magazine stated that Jacobs "is a marvelous raconteur, sweeping the reader along in a comfortable, amiable way". A review in Choice by D. Bardack said that Jacobs uses a "conversational style" that helps to get across the "salient points of anatomy" that relate to dinosaur evolutionary history.

== Critical reception ==
Judyth Rigler of the Fort Worth Star-Telegram called it a "visually stunning volume" that included "lively stories" about how the fossils were discovered. In the journal Nature, Douglas Palmer described the book as a "homely American family tale of hard work and togetherness in the search for and discovery of dinosaurs", though he lamented that children in the United Kingdom won't have the opportunities for such fossilized exploration. The Houston Chronicle's Charles P. Thobae criticized the writing style, being unclear on whom the book was aimed at, as the "prose style is at times technical and at other times overly simplistic". Writing for The Lapidary Journal, Scott Stepanski praised Lone Star Dinosaurs for being a "story of professional and amateur discovery from an often-overlooked region of paleontology".

== See also ==
- Malawisaurus
