= List of fossiliferous stratigraphic units in Mozambique =

Fossiliferous stratigraphic units in Mozambique
Maputo Formation
Lupata Group
Lebombo Formation
Lower Karoo Formation

This is a list of fossiliferous stratigraphic units in Mozambique.

Group	Formation	Period	Notes
	Maputo Formation	Late Aptian	
Lupata Group		Aptian	
	Lebombo Formation	Middle Jurassic	
	Lower Karoo Formation	Wordian	

== See also ==
- Lists of fossiliferous stratigraphic units in Africa
  - List of fossiliferous stratigraphic units in Madagascar
  - List of fossiliferous stratigraphic units in Malawi
  - List of fossiliferous stratigraphic units in South Africa
  - List of fossiliferous stratigraphic units in Zambia
  - List of fossiliferous stratigraphic units in Zimbabwe
- Geology of Mozambique
