= Açu Formation =

Early Cretaceous geologic formation in Ceará, Brazil

- Stratigraphic range: Albian; ~112–100 Ma
- Type: Geological formation
- Unit of: Apodi Group
- Underlies: Jandaíra Formation
- Overlies: Alagamar Formation

Lithology
- Primary: Sandstone

Location
- Coordinates: 5.8°S 38.1°W
- Approximate paleocoordinates: 11.9°S 10.9°W
- Region: Ceará
- Country: Brazil
- Extent: Potiguar Basin
- Açu Formation (Brazil)

The Açu Formation is an Early Cretaceous (Albian) geologic formation of the Potiguar Basin in Ceará, northeastern Brazil. The formation comprises coarse-grained sandstones deposited in a fluvio-deltaic environment. The Açu Formation, belonging to the Apodi Group, has provided fossils of an indeterminate rebbachisaurid.

== Description ==
The Açu Formation was deposited in a passive margin setting, overlying the Alagamar Formation and is overlain by the Jandaíra Formation. In the petroleum producing Potiguar Basin, the formation is a reservoir rock.

== Fossil content ==
The following fossils were reported from the formation:

| Color key: Taxon / Reclassified taxon / Taxon falsely reported as present / Dubious taxon or junior synonym / Ichnotaxon / Ootaxon / Morphotaxon | Notes; Uncertain or tentative taxa are in small text; ~~crossed out~~ taxa are discredited. |

=== Dinosaurs ===
==== Sauropods ====
Sauropods of the Açu Formation
| Genus | Species | Location | Stratigraphic position | Material | Notes | Images |
|---|---|---|---|---|---|---|
| Rebbachisauridae indet. | Indeterminate | Ceará | Albian | Vertebrae | | |
| Tiamat | T. valdecii | Ceará | Albian to Cenomanian | Caudal vertebrae | A titanosaurian sauropod; closely related to Andesaurus delgadoi. | |
| Titanosauria Indet. | Indeterminate | Ceará | Albian | Osteoderm | | |

==== Theropods ====
Theropods of the Açu Formation
| Genus | Species | Location | Stratigraphic position | Material | Notes | Images |
|---|---|---|---|---|---|---|
| Abelisauridae Indet. | Indeterminate | Ceará | Albian to Cenomanian | Teeth & Completed Femur | | |
| Baryonychinae Indet. | Indeterminate | Ceará | Albian | Tooth | A spinosaurid theropod | |
| Carcharodontosauridae Indet. | Indeterminate | Ceará | Albian | Vertebrae | | |
| Megaraptora Indet. | Indeterminate | Ceará | Albian | Vertebrae | | |
| Noasauridae Indet. | Indeterminate | Ceará | Albian to Cenomanian | Teeth | | |
| Paraves Indet. | Indeterminate | Ceará | Albian | Vertebrae | A maniraptoran theropod | |
| Spinosaurinae Indet. | Indeterminate | Ceará | Albian | Tooth | A spinosaurid theropod | |

=== Crocodylomorphs ===
Crocodylomorps of the Açu Formation
| Genus | Species | Location | Stratigraphic position | Material | Notes | Images |
|---|---|---|---|---|---|---|
| Candidodontidae Indet. | Indeterminat | Ceará | Albian to Cenomanian | | | |
| Itasuchidae Indet. | Indeterminate | Ceará | Albian to Cenomanian | | | |
| Peirosauridae Indet. | Indeterminate | Ceará | Albian | Insolated Tooth | | |
| Sphagesauria Indet. | Indeterminate | Ceará | Albian to Cenomanian | | | |

=== Fish ===
Fish of the Açu Formation
| Genus | Species | Location | Stratigraphic position | Material | Notes | Images |
|---|---|---|---|---|---|---|
| Arganodus | A. tiguidiensis | Ceará | Albian | Teeth | A arganodontid lungfish | |
| Ceratodus | C. brasilensis | Ceará | Albian | Teeth | A ceratodontid lungfish | |
| Bawitius | B. bartheli | Ceará | Albian | Scales & Tooth | A bichir | |
| Distobatus | D. potiguarense | Ceará | Albian to Cenomanian | | A distobatid hybodont | |
| Lepisosteus | L. sp. | Ceará | Albian to Cenomanian | Scales & Tooth | A gar | |
| Mawsonia | M. gigas | Ceará | Albian to Cenomanian | | A mawsoniid coelacanth | |
| Pycnodontiformes Indet. | Indeterminate | Ceará | Albian | Teeth | | |
| Tharrhias | T. castelhanoi | Ceará | Albian | Scales | A gonorynchiform fish | |
| Tribodus | T. limae | Ceará | Albian to Cenomanian | | A hybodont shark | |
| Vidalamiinae Indet. | Indeterminate | Ceará | Albian | | | |

=== Crustaceans ===
Crustaceans of the Açu Formation
| Genus | Species | Location | Stratigraphic position | Material | Notes | Images |
|---|---|---|---|---|---|---|
| Unusuropode | U. castroi | Ceará | Albian | | A isopod | |

=== Molluscs ===
==== Bivalves ====
Bivalves of the Açu Formation
| Genus | Species | Location | Stratigraphic position | Material | Notes | Images |
|---|---|---|---|---|---|---|
| Brachidontes | B. sp. | Ceará | Albian | | A mytilid mussel | |
| Mytilus | M. rosadoi | Ceará | Albian | | A mytilid mussel | |

==== Gastropods ====
Gastropods of the Açu Formation
| Genus | Species | Location | Stratigraphic position | Material | Notes | Images |
|---|---|---|---|---|---|---|
| Gastropoda Indet. | Indeterminate | Ceará | Albian | | | |

=== Echinoderms ===
Echinoderms of the Açu Formation
| Genus | Species | Location | Stratigraphic position | Material | Notes | Images |
|---|---|---|---|---|---|---|
| Echinodermata Indet. | Indeterminate | Rio Grande do Norte | Albian | | | |

=== Plants ===
Plants of the Açu Formation
| Genus | Species | Location | Stratigraphic position | Material | Notes | Images |
|---|---|---|---|---|---|---|
| Palmoxylon | P. sp. | Rio Grande do Norte | Albian | | | |

=== Bibliography ===
- Gomes da Costa Pereira, Paulo Victor; Ribeiro, Theo Baptista; Brusatte, Stephen Louis; Dos Anjos Candeiro, Carlos Roberto; da Silva Marinho, Thiago; Paglarelli Bergqvist, Lilian (2020), "Theropod (Dinosauria) diversity from the Potiguar basin (Early-late Cretaceous Albian – Cenomanian), Northeast Brazil" (PDF), Cretaceous Research, in press 104517, doi:10.1016/j.cretres.2020.104517, hdl:20.500.11820/849a673d-9aa1-4b8e-be0c-f630af8a5d5e
- Maraschin, Anderson; Mizusaki, Ana Maria P.; Vasconcelos, P.M.; Hinrichs, Ruth (2010), "Depositional age definition of the Açu Formation (Potiguar Basin, northeastern Brazil) through 40Ar-39Ar dating of early-authigenic K-feldspar overgrowths", Pesquisas em Geociências, 37: 85–96, doi:10.22456/1807-9806.22649
