= Cryptobicuspidon =

Cryptobicuspidon Temporal range: Aptian, ~125 Ma

Scientific classification
- Kingdom: Animalia
- Phylum: Chordata
- Class: Reptilia
- Order: Squamata
- Clade: †Polyglyphanodontia
- Genus: †Cryptobicuspidon; Carvalho & Santucci, 2024
- Species: †C. pachysymphysealis

Binomial name
- †Cryptobicuspidon pachysymphysealis Carvalho & Santucci, 2024

Extinct genus of lizards

Cryptobicuspidon is an extinct genus of polyglyphanodontid lizard from the Early Cretaceous Quiricó Formation of Brazil. The type species is C. pachysymphysealis.

== Discovery and naming ==
The holotype, specimen FUP-Pv 000018, was discovered within massive and reddish sandstones from the Quiricó Formation, directly within the city of Campo Azul. The specimen was named as Cryptobicuspidon pachysymphysealis by Carvalho & Santucci (2024).
