= Dinosaur Beds =

Geological formation in Malawi

- Stratigraphic range: Barremian–Aptian
- Type: Geological formation
- Unit of: Lupata Group
- Sub-units: Lower Member, Upper Member
- Underlies: Unconformity with Pliocene Chiwondo Beds
- Overlies: Precambrian metamorphic basement
- Thickness: Upper member is 210 m (690 ft) thick in vicinity of CD-9 locality

Lithology
- Primary: Sandstone, siltstone, mudstone

Location
- Coordinates: 10.28°S 34.04°E
- Region: Northern Region
- Country: Malawi
- Extent: Karonga District
- Dinosaur Beds (Malawi)

The Dinosaur Beds is a geological formation in Malawi whose strata date back to the Early Cretaceous. The age of the deposit is poorly constrained, but is likely to date from the Barremian to Aptian. Dinosaurs, turtles and crocodylomorphs remains are among the fossils that have been recovered from the formation. It is correlated with the Galula Formation in Tanzania. It consists of two members, a lower unfossiliferous member consisting of deep red stained sandstones, and an upper fossiliferous member consisting of white sands and grey to red mudstones and siltstones. The upper member is 210 m thick in the vicinity of the CD-9 locality.

== Fossil content ==
Color key: Taxon / Reclassified taxon / Taxon falsely reported as present / Dubious taxon or junior synonym / Ichnotaxon / Ootaxon / Morphotaxon	Notes; Uncertain or tentative taxa are in small text; ~~crossed out~~ taxa are discredited.

=== Dinosaurs ===
==== Sauropoda ====
Sauropods of the Dinosaur Beds
Genus	Species	Location	Stratigraphic position	Material	Notes	Images
Karongasaurus	K. gittelmani				A titanosaurian sauropod	
Malawisaurus	M. dixeyi				A titanosaurian sauropod	

==== Theropoda ====
Theropods of the Dinosaur Beds
Genus	Species	Location	Stratigraphic position	Material	Notes	Images
Theropoda indet.	Indeterminate					

=== Crocodyliformes ===
Crocodyliformes of the Dinosaur Beds
Genus	Species	Location	Stratigraphic position	Material	Notes	Images
Malawisuchus	M. mwakasyungutiensis					A candidodontid notosuchian

=== Turtles ===
Turtles of the Dinosaur Beds
Genus	Species	Location	Stratigraphic position	Material	Notes	Images
Platycheloides	P. nyasae				A pelomedusid turtle	

=== Amphibians ===
Amphibians of the Dinosaur Beds
Genus	Species	Location	Stratigraphic position	Material	Notes	Images
Anura indet.	Indeterminate					

=== Crutaceans ===
Crustaceans of the Dinosaur Beds
Genus	Species	Location	Stratigraphic position	Material	Notes	Images
Hourcqia	H. sp.					A non-marine ostracod

== See also ==
- List of dinosaur-bearing rock formations
- List of fossiliferous stratigraphic units in Malawi
