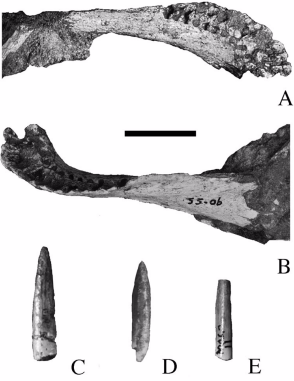
- Holotype elements: mandible seen from two angles, and three teeth

Scientific classification
- Kingdom: Animalia
- Phylum: Chordata
- Class: Reptilia
- Clade: Dinosauria
- Clade: Saurischia
- Clade: †Sauropodomorpha
- Clade: †Sauropoda
- Clade: †Macronaria
- Clade: †Titanosauria
- Genus: †Karongasaurus; Gomani, 2005

Type species
- Karongasaurus gittelmani Gomani, 2005

= Karongasaurus =

Karongasaurus Temporal range: Early Cretaceous, ~120–113 Ma

Extinct genus of dinosaurs

Karongasaurus (meaning Karonga lizard) is a genus of titanosaur sauropod dinosaur from the Early Cretaceous. The type species, K. gittelmani, was described by Elizabeth Gomani in 2005.

== Discovery and naming ==
The holotype (specimen Mal-175), consisting solely of part of a lower mandible and twenty isolated teeth, were found in the Dinosaur Beds of Malawi between 1987 and 1992. Karongasaurus was the first dinosaur named in a publication that was published solely online; Karongasaurus gittelmani was named and described by Gomani (2005).

== Description ==
The mandible of Karongasaurus is U-shaped in dorsal view and the teeth are described as slender and conical in shape, being more cylindrical than those of Malawisaurus.

== Classification ==
Gomani (2005) placed Karongasaurus within Titanosauria.
