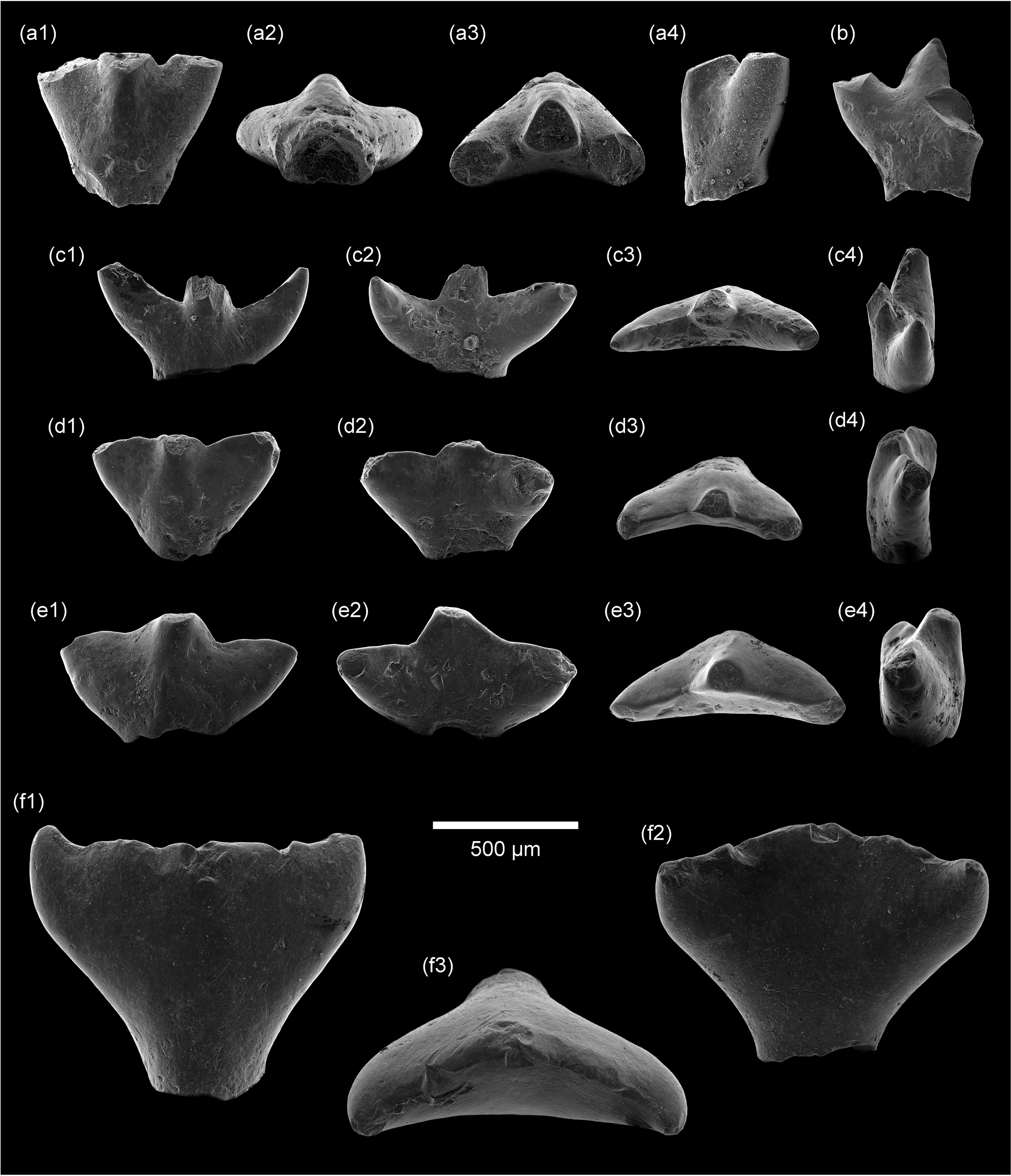
- Teeth of L. trifurcatum
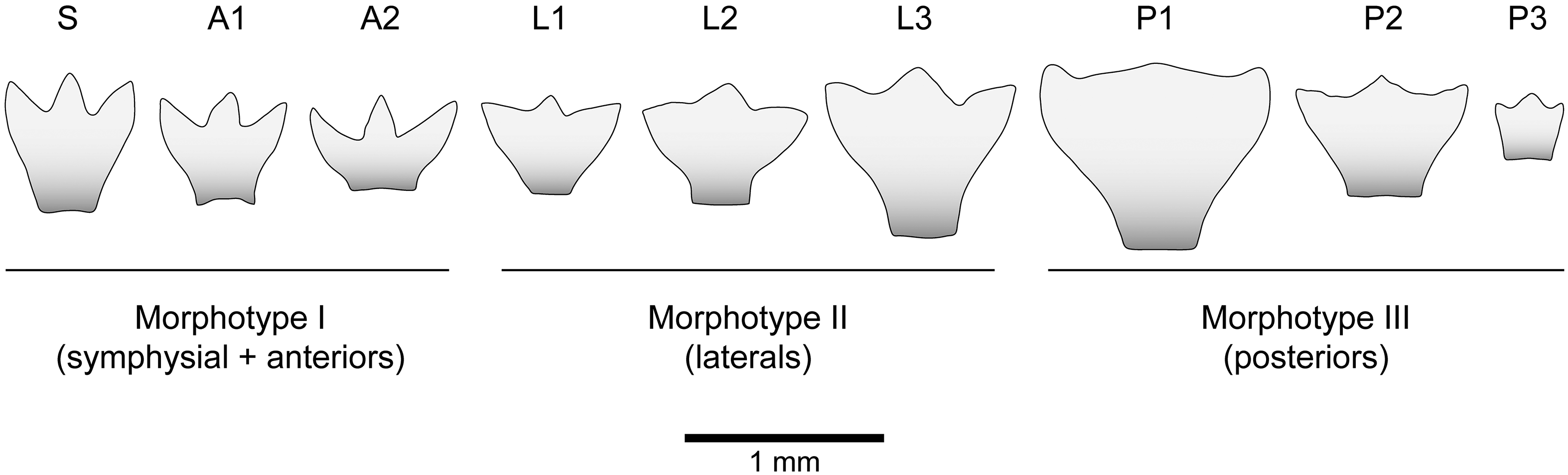
- Tentative reconstruction of the dentition of the lower jaw of L. trifurcatum

Scientific classification
- Kingdom: Animalia
- Phylum: Chordata
- Class: Chondrichthyes
- Order: †Hybodontiformes
- Family: †Lonchidiidae
- Genus: †Lonchidionoides; Vullo et al., 2026

Type species
- †Lonchidionoides trifurcatum Vullo et al., 2026

= Lonchidionoides =

Lonchidionoides Temporal range: Cretaceous, Barremian–Cenomanian

Extinct genus of hybodont chondrichthyans

Lonchidionoides is an extinct genus of hybodont in the family Lonchidiidae. The genus contains a single named species, Lonchidionoides trifurcatum, known from the 'mid'-Cretaceous (latest Albian–early Cenomanian ages) Tiout Formation of Algeria. Teeth of this genus are also known from the Early Cretaceous (Barremian–Aptian ages) Quiricó Formation of Brazil, and have been left in open nomenclature as L. sp. pending new material.

== Discovery and naming ==
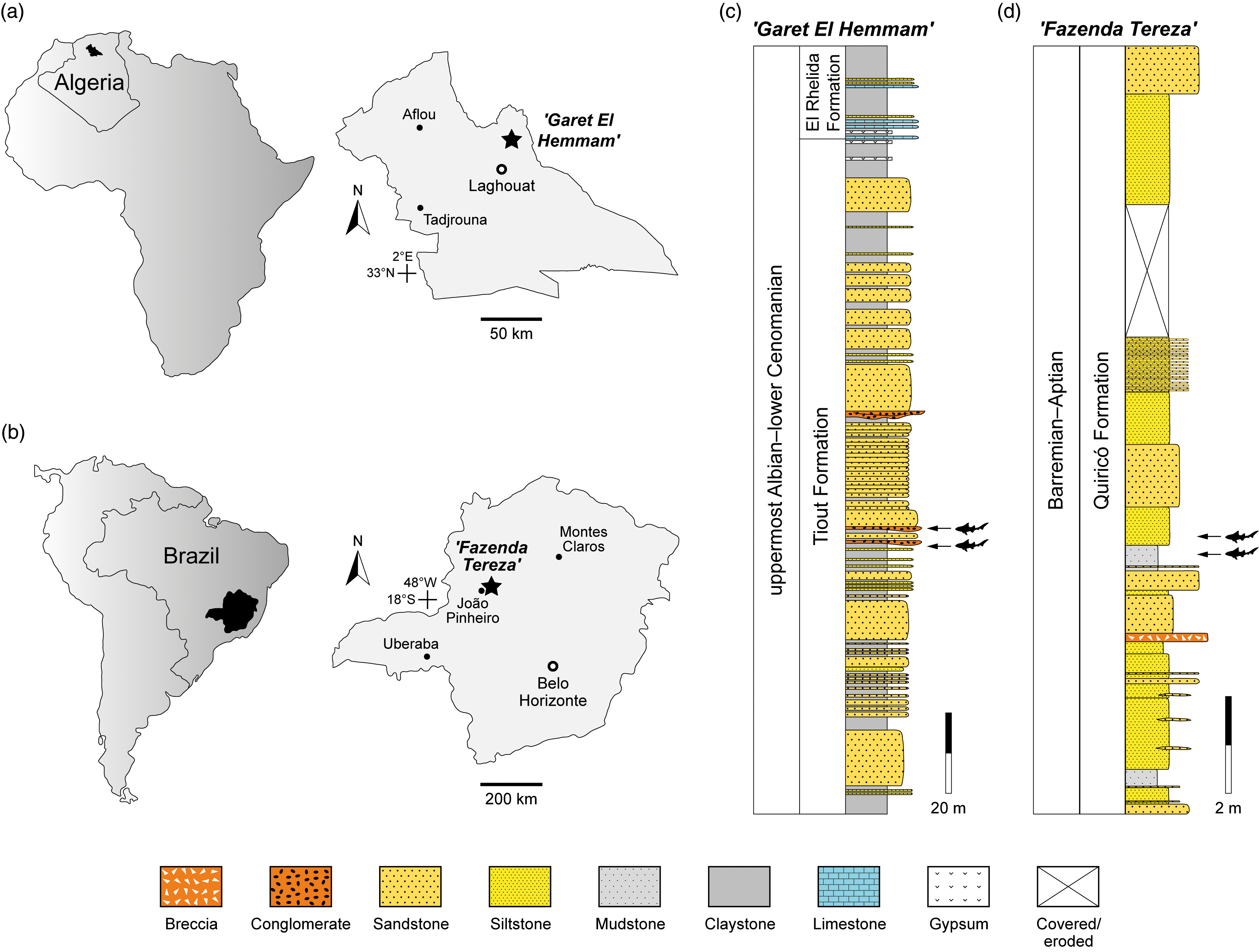
Localities where Lonchidionoides teeth have been found

In 2026, Romain Vullo and colleagues described Lonchidionoides trifurcatum as a new genus and species of lonchidiid hybodont based on five teeth from the Tiout Formation ('Garet El Hemmam' locality) of Laghouat Province, northern Algeria. The generic name, Lonchidionodes, derives from its similarity to the teeth of Lonchidion, the namesake of the family Lonchidiidae. The specific name, trifurcatum, refers to the trident-like morphology of the anterior dentition.

Nine isolated teeth from the Early Cretaceous Quiricó Formation ('Fazenda Tereza' locality) were initially described as ?Lonchidiidae in 2021. These are nearly identical in morphology and size to L. trifurcatum, but remain in open nomenclature as L. sp., awaiting further specimens that would allow more precise taxonomy.
