= Areado Group =

Geologic group in southeastern Brazil

- Stratigraphic range: Tithonian-Albian; ~150–100 Ma
- Type: Group
- Sub-units: Três Barras, Quiricó & Abaeté Formations
- Underlies: Mata da Corda Group
- Overlies: Bambuí Group

Lithology
- Primary: Sandstone, claystone, conglomerate

Location
- Coordinates: 18.2°S 45.7°W
- Approximate paleocoordinates: 17.1°S 12.1°W
- Region: Minas Gerais
- Country: Brazil
- Extent: São Francisco Basin

Type section
- Named by: Cardoso
- Year defined: 1968
- Areado Group (Brazil)

The Areado Group is a Late Jurassic to Early Cretaceous (Tithonian to Albian; covering approximately 50 million years) geologic group in southeastern Brazil. The group was defined by Cardoso in 1968.

Various fossil theropod tracks have been reported from the aeolic sandstones of the group.

== Stratigraphy ==
The group contains the following formations from young to old:

- Albian Três Barras Formation - eolian and fluvio-deltaic sandstones
- Aptian Quiricó Formation - lacustrine claystones
- Tithonian-Barremian Abaeté Formation - fluvial conglomerates

== See also ==
- List of dinosaur-bearing rock formations
  - List of stratigraphic units with theropod tracks

== Bibliography ==
- Cristóvão Baptista, Marcos (2004), Estratigrafia e evolução geológica da região de Lagoa Formosa (MG) (MSc. thesis) (PDF), Universidade Federal de Minas Gerais, pp. 1–116
- Weishampel, David B.; Dodson, Peter; Osmólska, Halszka (2004), The Dinosauria, 2nd edition, Berkeley: University of California Press, pp. 1–880, ISBN 0-520-24209-2
- Carvalho, I. d. S.; Kattah, S. d. S. (1998), "Dinosaur footprints from Sanfranciscana Basin, Minas Gerais State, Brazil", Anais da Academia Brasileira de Ciências, 70: 53–67
