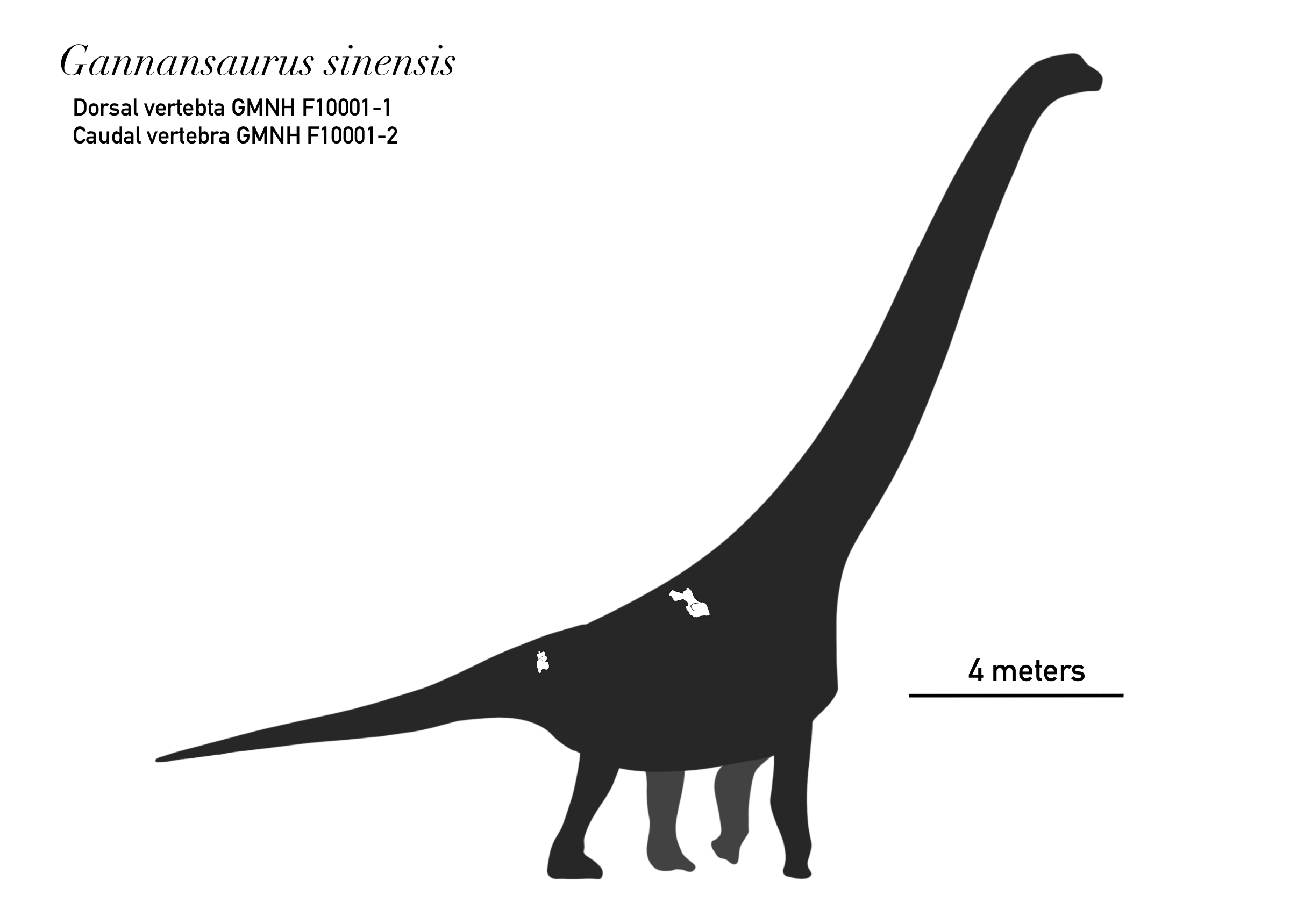
- Skeletal restoration of Gannansaurus sinensis.

Scientific classification
- Kingdom: Animalia
- Phylum: Chordata
- Clade: Dinosauria
- Clade: Saurischia
- Clade: †Sauropodomorpha
- Clade: †Sauropoda
- Clade: †Macronaria
- Genus: †Gannansaurus; Lü et al., 2013
- Species: †G. sinensis

Binomial name
- †Gannansaurus sinensis Lü et al., 2013

= Gannansaurus =

Gannansaurus Temporal range: Late Cretaceous, 66.7–66 Ma

Extinct genus of dinosaurs

Gannansaurus (meaning "Gannan lizard") is an extinct genus of somphospondylan sauropod dinosaur known from the Upper Cretaceous Nanxiong Formation of Ganzhou Basin, Jiangxi Province of southern China. It is known from specimen GMNH F10001 which consists of a single, nearly complete dorsal vertebra and a mid-caudal vertebra. Gannansaurus was first named by Lü Junchang, Yi Laiping, Zhong Hui and Wei Xuefang in 2013 and the type species is Gannansaurus sinensis. Gannansaurus shares some characters with Euhelopus, indicating that it is more closely related to it rather than to other titanosauriforms.

== History of discovery ==
The type specimen was collected from a construction site near Longling Town in Ganzhou, China. Most of the specimen was destroyed as a result of the construction work, but one dorsal vertebra was able to be pieced back together from fragments. A caudal vertebra was also saved. The two vertebrae are stored at the Ganzhou Museum of Natural History with the catalog number GMNH F10001. In 2013, Lü Junchang, Yi Laiping, Zhong Hui and Wei Xuefang described the remains as a new genus and species of sauropod, Gannansaurus sinensis. The genus name refers to the Gannan district of Ganzhou, where the specimens were found, and the species name refers to the specimens being found in China. The two vertebrae are assumed to represent the same individual based on their recovery from the same quarry.

== Classification ==
In their original description of Gannansaurus, Lü and colleagues suggested that it was closely related to Euhelopus, on the basis of a K-shaped arrangement of vertebral laminae uniquely shared by the two taxa. Gannansaurus was included in a phylogenetic analysis by Mo and colleagues in 2023, and was recovered as a basal titanosauriform.

== Paleoecology ==
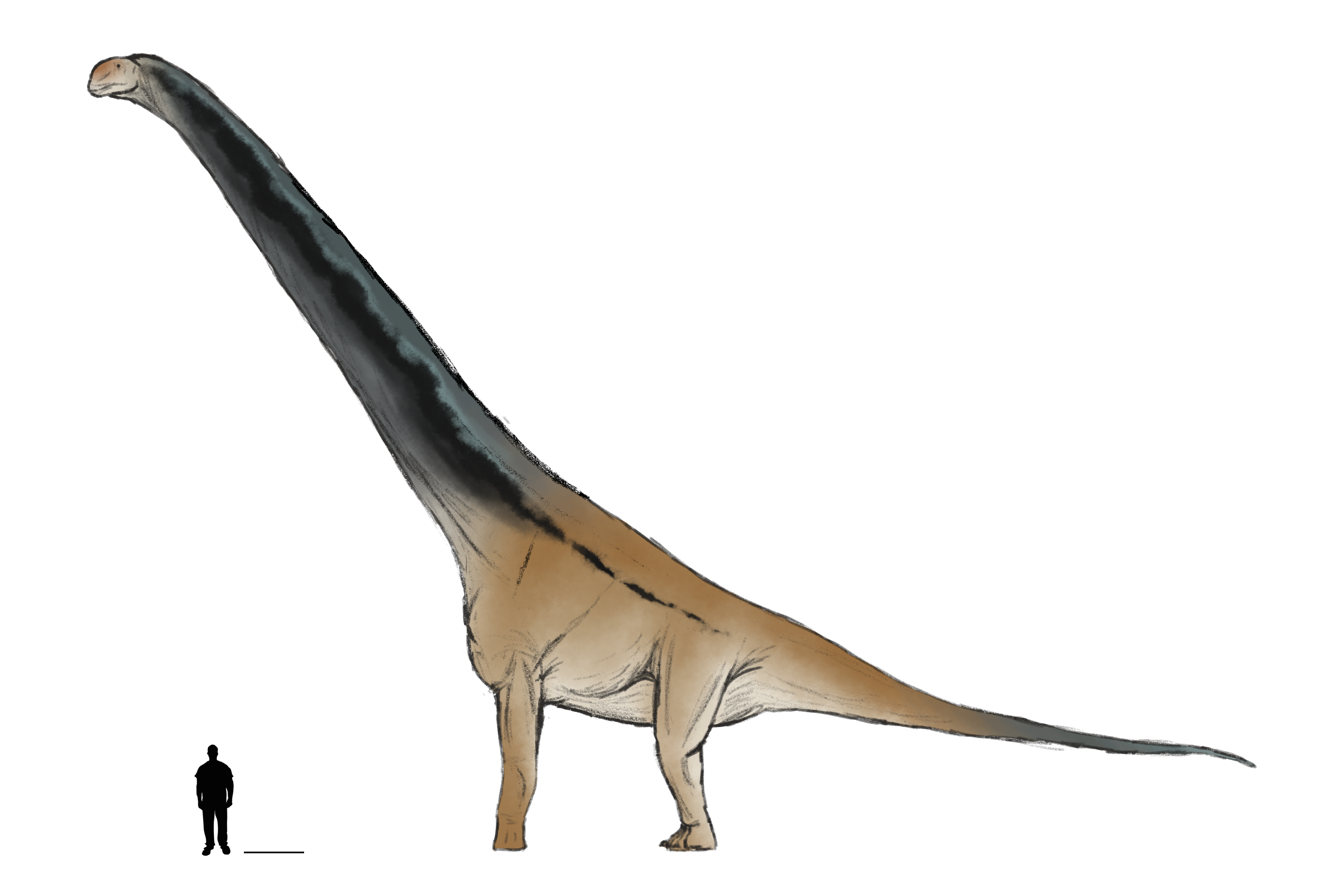
Size estimation of Gannansaurus compared to human

The ecosystem preserved in the Nanxiong Formation contained at least one other sauropod, Jiangxititan. The top predator of the ecosystem was the tyrannosaurid Qianzhousaurus. Gannansaurus has been estimated at 25 metres (82 ft) long.
