= Lavocatchampsa =

Lavocatchampsa Temporal range: Late Cretaceous

Scientific classification
- Kingdom: Animalia
- Phylum: Chordata
- Class: Reptilia
- Clade: Archosauria
- Clade: Pseudosuchia
- Clade: Crocodylomorpha
- Clade: †Notosuchia
- Family: †Candidodontidae
- Genus: †Lavocatchampsa; Martin and de Lapparent de Broin, 2016
- Species: †L. sigogneaurusselae

Binomial name
- †Lavocatchampsa sigogneaurusselae Martin and de Lapparent de Broin, 2016

Extinct genus of mesoeucrocodylian

Lavocatchampsa is an extinct genus of notosuchian mesoeucrocodylian known from the Late Cretaceous Kem Kem Beds in Morocco. It contains a single species, Lavocatchampsa sigogneaurusselae.
