= Tribodus =

Tribodus Temporal range: Albian–Cenomanian

Scientific classification
- Kingdom: Animalia
- Phylum: Chordata
- Class: Chondrichthyes
- Order: †Hybodontiformes
- Genus: †Tribodus; Brito & Ferreira, 1989

Type species
- †Tribodus limae Brito & Ferreira, 1989

Other species
- Tribodus morlati Landemaine, 1991

Genus of hybodont shark from the Early Cretaceous period

Tribodus is an extinct genus of hybodont. It lived during the mid Cretaceous (Albian-Cenomanian) with fossils being known from northern South America, North Africa, and southern Europe.

== Description ==
This genus is known from articulated and somewhat complete specimens of Tribodus limae from the Romualdo Formation, Açu Formation and Alcântara Formation of northeastern Brazil, making it one of the few hybodonts to be known from full body remains. Like other hybodonts, Tribodus had dorsal fin-spines and cephalic spines in male individuals. The skin of Tribodus had two distinct types of dermal denticles. Tribodus limae reached a total length of about 1 metre (3.3 ft). The lower jaw was relatively short and did not extend to the snout region and articulated with the upper jaw at exclusively at the hyoid arch unlike other hybodonts, with a number of cartilage struts connecting the upper and lower jaws which enhanced jaw strength. The teeth of Tribodus were specialised for durophagy (consuming hard shelled organisms). They were small, less than 5 millimetres (3/16 in) across and polygonal with a low cusp, and collectively formed a flat pavement that was effective at grinding, similar to those of living myliobatoid rays. It is suggested to have been a benthic feeder, with shrimp being discovered as stomach contents in some specimens.

Species of Tribodus have been found in shallow marine as well as fluvial and deltaic environments. It may have spawned in shallow-water vegetated areas.

== Classification ==
Its placement within the Hybodontiformes is uncertain. Historically it has been asserted to be a member of the family Acrodontidae with other durophagous hybodonts, based on the presence of columnar osteodentine in its teeth. However, other authors have suggested that it should instead be placed in the family Distobatidae due to the morphology of its teeth closely resembling members of that family.
