= Louis L. Jacobs =

American vertebrate paleontologist (born 1948)

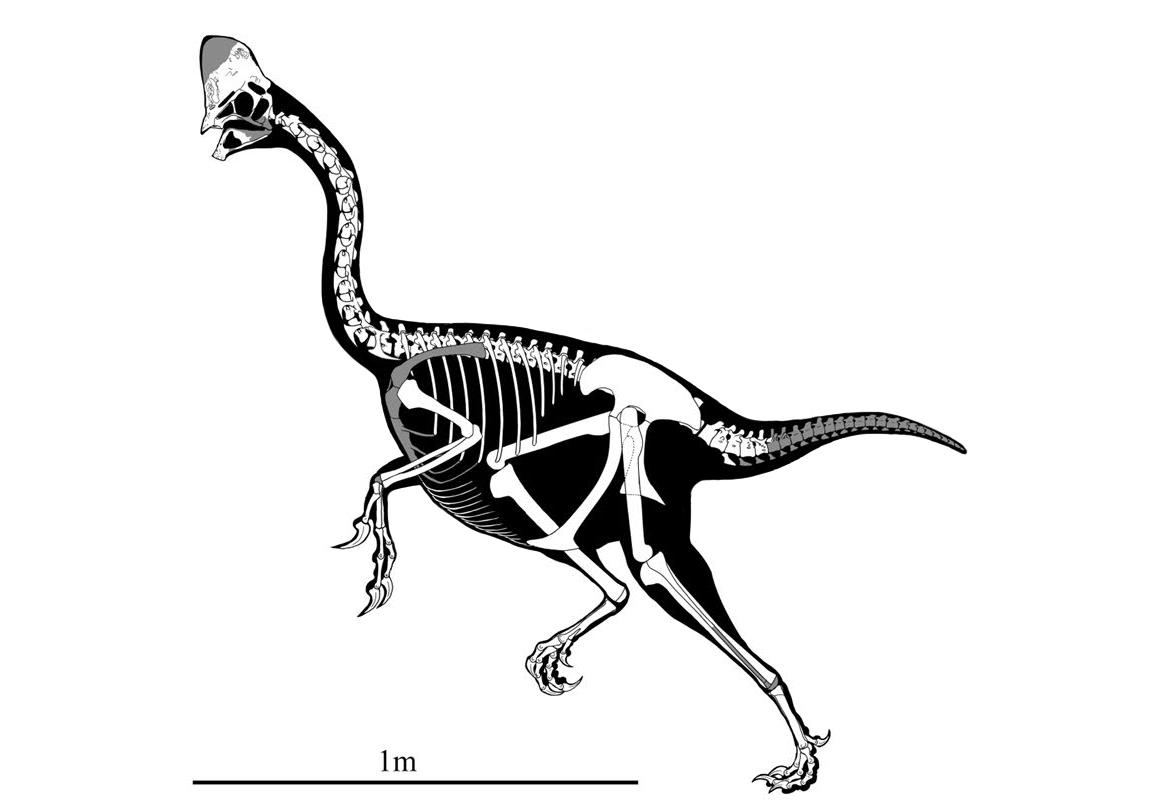
Jacobs' namesake, Corythoraptor jacobsi (67–66 Mya)

Louis Leo Jacobs (born August 27, 1948) is an American vertebrate paleontologist who discovered Malawisaurus while on an expedition in Malawi. Much of his research concerns the interrelationships of biotic and abiotic events through time. In 2010, he has focused on the middle portion of the Cretaceous and the Cenozoic, especially with respect to terrestrial ecosystems. In 2018, he retired from the Dedman College as Professor Emeritus of Earth Sciences.

He used to be the president of the Society of Vertebrate Paleontology and is currently a professor of geological sciences at Dedman College and the president of the Institute for the Study of Earth and Man (ISEM) at Southern Methodist University (SMU). At one point in time, he was the director of the Museum of Natural History in Dallas, Texas.

Louis Jacobs is a vertebrate paleontologist who utilizes the fossil record to answer significant questions about Earth and life history. His fieldwork is currently focused in Angola, Antarctica, Alaska, and Mongolia. The oviraptorosaurian theropod dinosaur Corythoraptor jacobsi was named after him by students he mentored at SMU. He is married to paleobotanist Bonnie Jacobs.

== Career ==
He earned his Ph.D. from the University of Arizona. While he was accomplishing this, Jacobs was also working with Kenyan anthropologist Richard Leakey. Afterward, he began working at SMU in 1983.

== Books written ==
- A Global View of Early Cretaceous Dinosaurs (1997)
- Cretaceous Dinosaurs of Africa: Examples from Cameroon and Malawi, Memoirs of the Queensland Museum (Co-writer) (1996)
- Lone Star Dinosaurs (1995)
- Cretaceous Airport - The Surprising Story of Real Dinosaurs at DFW (1993)
- Quest for the African Dinosaur: Ancient Roots of the Modern World (1993)
- Evolution of Tertiary Mammals of North America: Terrestrial carnivores, ungulates, and ungulatelike mammals (Co-editor)
- Late Miocene Small Mammal Faunal Dynamics: The Crossroads of the Arabian Peninsula (Co-writer)
- A Dinosaur from the Republic of Yemen (Co-writer)
- Aspects of Vertebrate History: Essays in Honor of Edwin Harris Colbert (1980)

== See also ==
- Malawisaurus
- Lone Star Dinosaurs
