= Geology of Malawi =

The geology of Malawi formed on extremely ancient crystalline basement rock, which was metamorphosed and intruded by igneous rocks during several orogeny mountain building events in the past one billion years. The rocks of the Karoo Supergroup and newer sedimentary units deposited across much of Malawi in the last 251 million years, in connection with a large rift basin on the supercontinent Gondwana and the more recent rifting that has created the East African Rift, which holds Lake Malawi. The country has extensive mineral reserves, many of them poorly understood or not exploited, including coal, vermiculite, rare earth elements and bauxite.

== Stratigraphy and geologic history ==
The oldest rocks in Malawi are crystalline metamorphic basement rocks in the south that formed nearly two billion years ago. The oldest rocks may have originated from marine sediments and igneous rocks, based on the presence of marble. The Rusizi-Ubendia orogeny, a mountain building event 1.8 billion years ago in the Paleoproterozoic deformed and metamorphosed the rocks in the north of the country, affecting a large swath of what is now central Africa including southern Tanzania, northern Zambia, Burundi, Rwanda and the Democratic Republic of the Congo.

The region affected by the Mozambique orogeny may have extended as far south as the Limpopo Orogenic Belt in South Africa, but subsequent tectonic activity has erased traces in the rock.

=== Mesoproterozoic (1.6–1 billion years ago) ===
The Irumide orogeny began 1.6 billion years ago, at the start of the Mesoproterozoic and continued until 900 million years ago. The event caused regional deformation, metamorphism and igneous intrusions preserved in northern Malawi, Tanzania and Zambia. The Nyika granite and perhaps also the Dzalanyama granite emplaced in the north, followed by the mudstones, sandstones and conglomerates of the Mafingi Group, which deposited in a shallow marine environment. The Dzalanyama granite intruded into the preexisting Mchinji Group calcareous mudstones.

=== Neoproterozoic (1 billion – 539 million years ago) ===
The Mozambique orogeny began in the Neoproterozoic, subdivided by structural geologists into the Katangan and Damaran episode. Basement rocks were deformed and metamorphosed, in many cases forming migmatites. The event produced large areas of high-grade metamorphism in southern Malawi, producing rocks such as charnockite granulites, gneiss, hornblende schist and biotite. Perthite gneisses and granulites formed in areas with isoclinal folding. The Mchinji Group experienced some low-grade metamorphism.

=== Paleozoic (539–251 million years ago) ===
As the Mozambique orogeny came to an end, brittle deformation produced phyllonite in older gneisses in northern Malawi. Granite, syenite and nepheline syenite intruded rocks and the Mafingi Group experienced low-grade metamorphism.

=== Mesozoic (251–66 million years ago) ===
In the Permian a large rift valley opened up across the southern part of the supercontinent Gondwana, spanning into what is now southern South America. Throughout the Mesozoic, the basin filled with sediments forming the Karoo Supergroup, the most extensive sedimentary unit in southern Africa. In Malawi, the Karoo Supergroup deposited between the Permian and the Late Jurassic, creating sequences of mudstone, sandstone, marl and even coal seams. Sediment deposition was followed by dolerite intrusions and basalt flows in southern Malawi, which now comprise the Stormberg Group.

In the Late Jurassic and Early Cretaceous, carbonatites, feldspar, granulites and feldspathoid syenites intruded, forming the Chilwa Alkaline Province in southern Malawi. The Zomba Mountains and Mulanje Mountains both formed during this period as ring complexes related to the intrusion. Complex faulting created opportunities for sediment to accumulate in fault troughs, generating the dinosaur beds in the north and calcareous sandstones in the south.

=== Cenozoic (66 million years ago – present) ===
With the creation of the East Africa Rift beginning in the late Mesozoic, fault-trough sedimentation created the Sungwa Bed, Chitimwe Bed and Chiwondo Beds in the Paleogene, Neogene and Quaternary. These three beds preserve the early sedimentation of Lake Malawi. The water surface was probably 300 meters higher above sea level than it is presently, confined to an area a quarter of its present size in the north.

Geologists believe that down-faulting allowed the lake water to flow to lower elevations, extending to Cape Maclear Peninsula. The Dwangwa gravels, found along the shores of the lake are probably remnant beach deposits. The Songwe Volcanoes in northern Malawi erupted in the Pleistocene.

== Structural geology and tectonics ==
After the Karoo Supergroup rocks deposited in tectonically controlled basins, the rocks were down-faulted into several normal fault troughs in northern and southwestern Malawi. Down-faulting in the late Mesozoic through the Cenozoic formed the East Africa Rift, which filled in with Lake Malawi and other lakes. The Rift Valley continues from the Zambezi River to the Red Sea.

== Hydrogeology ==
Precambrian crystalline basement rock is the main groundwater source underlying Malawi. Although permeability is low, the water is generally good quality except in places where it encounters and dissolves evaporite deposits where it can have high salinity. Unconsolidated saprolite forms a weathered, unconfined aquifer in Precambrian material between 15 and 30 meters thick in plateau areas. Well-sorted, unconsolidated alluvial and lake bed sediments are important near surface aquifers in parts of the country, with water five to 10 meters below ground, but they tend to be more mineralized than water from basement rock. In fact, groundwater is not potable in the Shire Valley and Bwanje Valley due to high salinity from dissolved evaporates.

Plutonic rocks contain hardly any groundwater and Karoo Supergroup sedimentary rocks are usually too cemented to have much permeability, except for small quantities of water 20 to 30 meters below the surface. Malawi has some locally productive aquifers in weather fractures around lava flows in the Stormberg volcanic rocks as well as Cretaceous and Quaternary sedimentary rocks.

== Natural resource geology ==
Malawi has extensive mineral reserves, but most are undeveloped. The Songwe Carbonatite and the Kangankunde Carbonatite near Mulanje and Ntcheu respectively, each contain rare earth elements as well as pyrochlore, barite, apatite and strontianite. Seventy five kilometers west of Blantyre there is a uranium deposit at Thambani. Mpatamanga in the same area has commercially viable vermiculite deposits.

Historically, Malawi imported coal from Mozambique even though coal deposits were known in the north. There are now two coal mines on the Livingstonia Coalfield. Bauxite is found on the Mlanje syenographic massif, 25 kilometers northeast of Mlanje. Unexploited deposits of porcelain clay, graphite and sand usable for silicon production exist throughout the country. Geologists are in the process of exploring for hydrocarbons, gold, gypsum, chromite, copper, nickel, rutile and salt.
