= Malawisuchus =

Malawisuchus Temporal range: Aptian ~120–113 Ma

Scientific classification
- Kingdom: Animalia
- Phylum: Chordata
- Class: Reptilia
- Clade: Pseudosuchia
- Clade: Crocodylomorpha
- Clade: †Notosuchia
- Family: †Candidodontidae
- Genus: †Malawisuchus; Gomani, 1997

Species
- †M. mwakasyungutiensis Gomani, 1997 (type)

Extinct genus of reptiles

Malawisuchus (meaning "Malawi crocodile") is an extinct genus of notosuchian mesoeucrocodylian from the Early Cretaceous Dinosaur Beds of Malawi.

== Description ==
Malawisuchus was described in 1997 by Elizabeth Gomani as a member of the family Notosuchidae. The type species is M. mwakasyungutiensis, referring to Mwakasyunguti, the area of northern Malawi where it was found. It was classified as a member of the family Itasuchidae by Carvalho and colleagues in 2004.

Malawisuchus was first discovered in 1989, but not formally described for several years. It had unusual, mammal-like teeth, including teeth with multiple cusps in the rear of the jaw. Its jaw joint suggests it processed food with a forward motion. The neck was strong, and the articulations of the hind leg suggest an upright posture and an ability to run, while the muscle attachments on the upper arm suggest digging; additionally, the taphonomy of articulated specimens suggests that they had been preserved in burrows. It was a small crocodilian, only about 60 centimetres long (24 in).
