= Candidodontidae =

Candidodontids Temporal range: 120–92 Ma Aptian - Turonian

Scientific classification
- Kingdom: Animalia
- Phylum: Chordata
- Class: Reptilia
- Clade: Pseudosuchia
- Clade: Crocodylomorpha
- Clade: †Notosuchia
- Clade: †Ziphosuchia
- Family: †Candidodontidae; Carvalho et al., 2004

Genera
- †Candidodon; †Lavocatchampsa; †Malawisuchus; †Pakasuchus; †Thilastikosuchus

Extinct family of reptiles

Candidodontidae is a family of notosuchian crocodyliforms. It was originally used in 2002 as a name for a clade that includes the genera Araripesuchus, Candidodon, and Malawisuchus. Later in 2004 the family was formally defined as a node-based taxon including Candidodon itapecuruense and Mariliasuchus amarali. A 2009 study redefined Candidodontidae as a stem-based taxon which included Candidodon, Malawisuchus, and possibly Mariliasuchus.

== Phylogenetics ==
The first formal definition of the family does not fit well with many phylogenetic studies of notosuchians that place Candidodon and Mariliasuchus far apart. If this definition were to be used, Candidodontidae would include the last common ancestor of Candidodon and Mariliasuchus and all of its descendants. According to these studies, these descendants would include many other genera and families, some of which were named before Candidodontidae and thus would have priority over it.

A new definition was given in 2009 in which Candidodontidae was considered a stem-based taxon. Under this definition, Candidodontidae includes all taxa more closely related to Candidodon itapecuruensis than to Notosuchus terrestris, Uruguaysuchus aznarezi, Comahuesuchus brachybuccalis, Sphagesaurus huenei, Baurusuchus pachecoi, and Crocodylus niloticus. The number of species that are less closely related to these taxa are called specifiers, and were used to insure that Candidodontidae did not become overly inclusive if Candidodon was placed in a different phylogenetic position in the future. According to the 2009 study, Candidodontidae included Candidodon, Malawisuchus, and possibly Mariliasuchus. However, the 2018 cladistic analysis of Roxochampsa recovered Mariliasuchus as a close relative of Sphagesauridae.

== Description ==
Members of Candidodontidae can be defined on the basis of synapomorphies, characteristics shared between taxa and present in their most recent common ancestor. When the family was first defined, several synapomorphies were used to diagnose it. For example, one synapomorphy was the large size of the supratemporal fenestrae, two holes that occupy most of the surface of the skull roof. Another synapomorphy was the similar size and shape of the postcaniniform teeth, those that are behind the caniniforms and in front of the molariforms. The distance between the front of the eye sockets and the tip of the snout is greater than or equal to the distance between the front of the eye sockets and the back of the skull. Inside the skull, the internal nares are not separated from one another.

The 2009 definition was from a study that focused on the teeth of notosuchians. Several features of the teeth of candidodontids were identified. These include a constricted crown base, a bulbous shape to the tooth, and several distinctive cusps. In candidodontids, namely Candidodon and Malawisuchus, there is a main cusp and several smaller cusps surrounding it.
