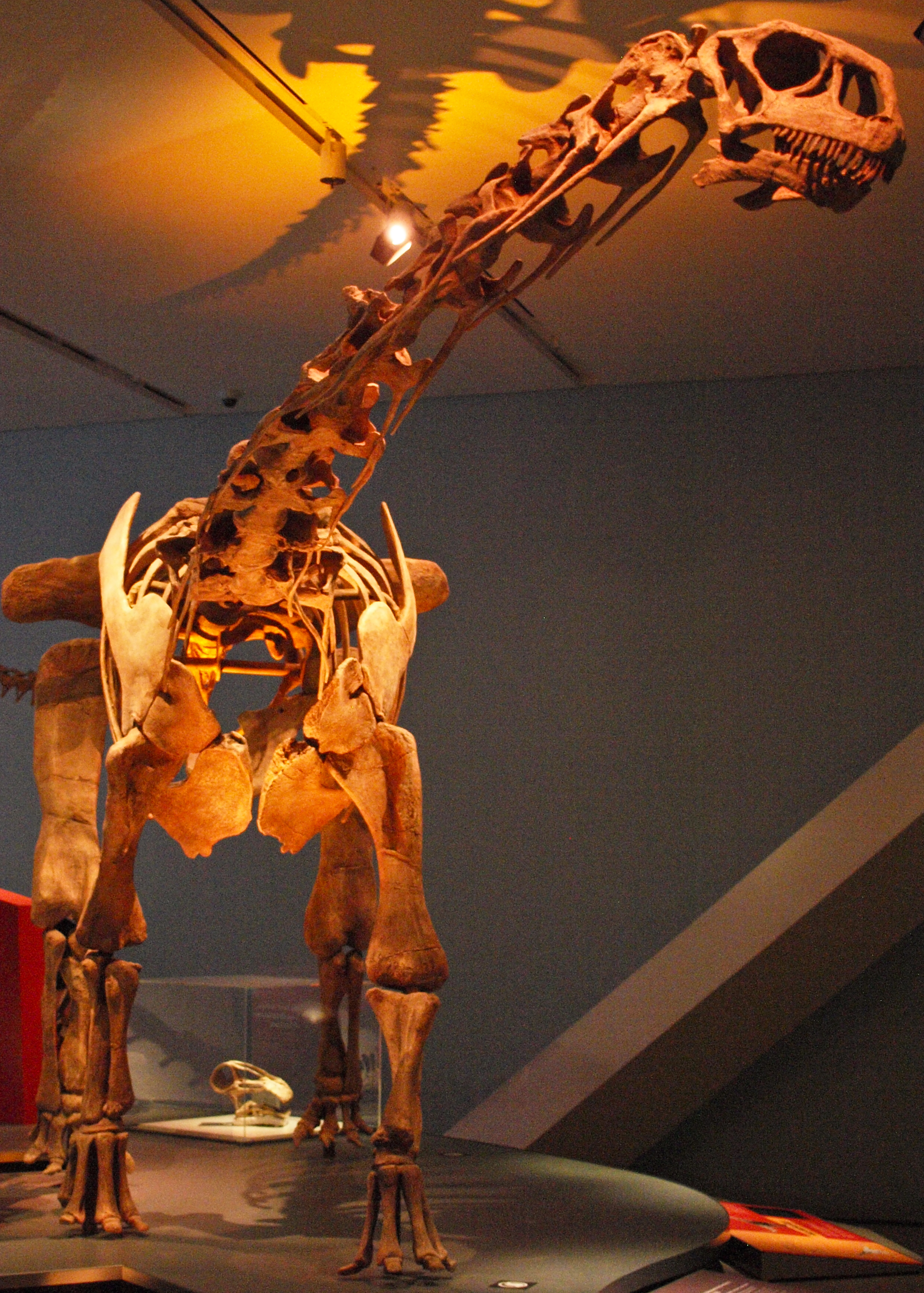
- Display at the Royal Ontario Museum

Scientific classification
- Kingdom: Animalia
- Phylum: Chordata
- Class: Reptilia
- Clade: Dinosauria
- Clade: Saurischia
- Clade: †Sauropodomorpha
- Clade: †Sauropoda
- Clade: †Macronaria
- Clade: †Titanosauria
- Clade: †Lithostrotia
- Genus: †Malawisaurus; Jacobs et al., 1993
- Species: †M. dixeyi

Binomial name
- †Malawisaurus dixeyi (Haughton, 1928) [originally Gigantosaurus, preoccupied]

Synonyms
- Gigantosaurus dixeyi Haughton, 1928 (preoccupied); Tornieria dixeyi (Haughton, 1928); Janenschia dixeyi (Haughton, 1928)

= Malawisaurus =

Malawisaurus Temporal range: Early Cretaceous Aptian

Extinct genus of dinosaurs

Malawisaurus (meaning "Malawi lizard") is an extinct genus of titanosaurian sauropod dinosaur. It is known from the Dinosaur Beds of northern Malawi, which probably date to the Aptian stage of the Early Cretaceous. The type species is M. dixeyi and the specific name honours Frederick Augustus Dixey.

== Discovery and naming ==
Size comparison

Malawisaurus dixeyi was originally described in 1928 by Sidney H. Haughton as a species of Gigantosaurus (an invalid name for the diplodocid currently known as Tornieria). Haughton considered it closely related to the species G. robustus (later the type species of Janenschia). The holotype was discovered c. 1924 in the "Dinosaur Beds" of Malawi (then known as the Nyasaland Protectorate), which are usually considered to be of Barremian-Aptian age based on K–Ar dating, though they have also been suggested to be Late Cretaceous in age based on the vertebrate assemblage. In 1993 it was placed in the newly named genus Malawisaurus by Louis L. Jacobs and colleagues, based on newly collected material from the locality. The holotype is SAM 7405, a partial skeleton and its type locality is Mwakasyunguti.

Malawisaurus is not known outside of Africa - however, an isolated tooth resembles those associated with Malawisaurus and was found in the Late Cretaceous (Cenomanian)-aged Alcântara Formation of Brazil according to a report in 2007.It is currently listed as "Titanosauria indet., possibly Malawisaurus .sp".

== Description ==
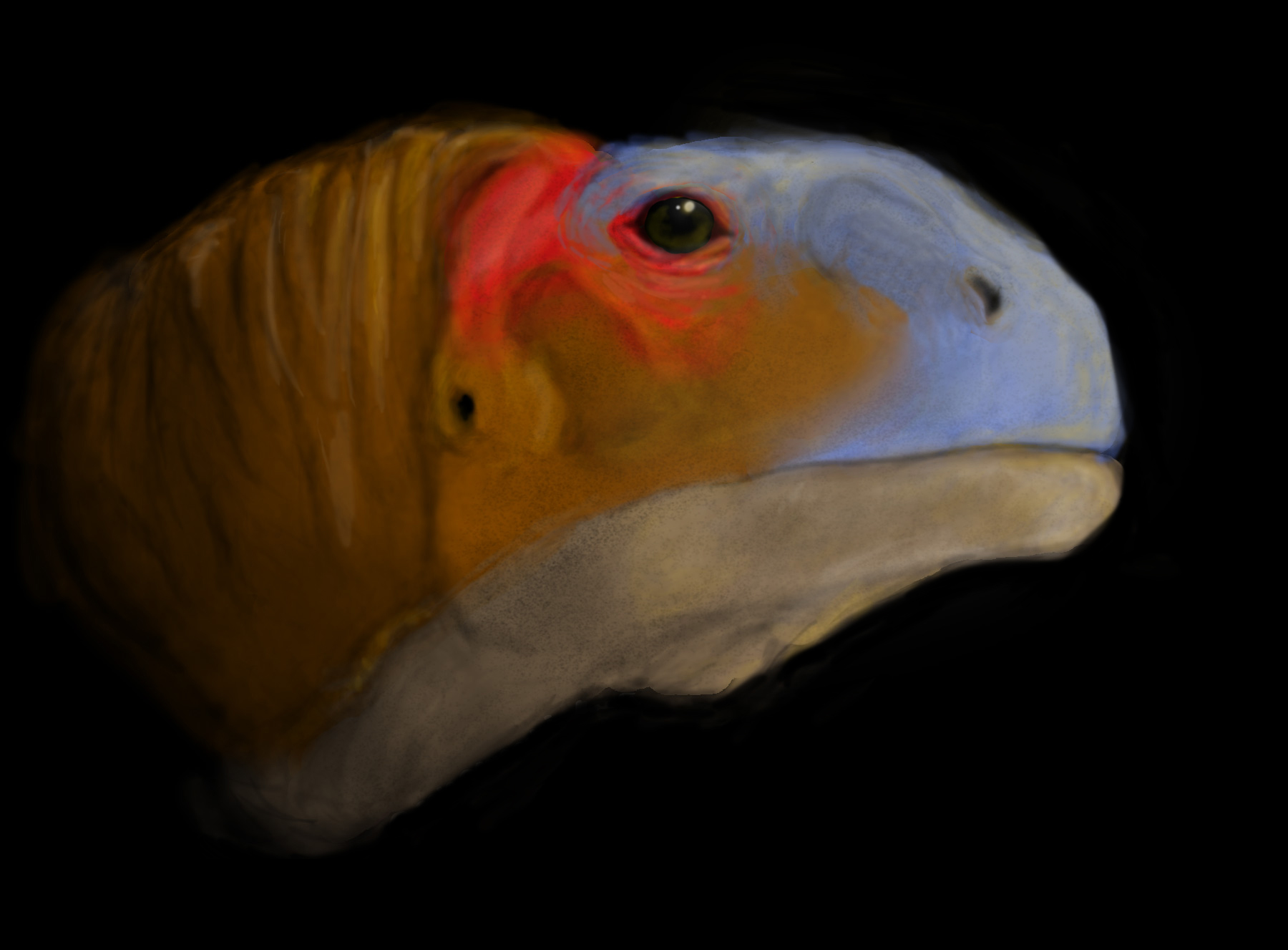
A reconstruction of the head

Relatively small by sauropod standards, Malawisaurus reached lengths of about 15 metres (49 ft), and weighed about 10 tonnes (11 short tons). In 2020 it was given a smaller estimation of 11 meters (36 ft) and 2.8 tonnes (3.1 short tons). Like some other titanosaurs, ossicles have been found which are believed to represent dermal scutes that covered the skin.

The vertebrae from the middle part of its tail had elongated centra. Malawisaurus had vertebral lateral fossae that resembled shallow depressions. Fossae that similarly resemble shallow depressions are known from Saltasaurus, Alamosaurus, Aeolosaurus, and Gondwanatitan.

== Classification ==
By definition, Malawisaurus has to be the most basal lithostrotian. The cladogram below follows Franca et al. (2016).

- Lithostrotia
  - Malawisaurus
  - - Muyelensaurus
    - - Nemegtosauridae
        - Nemegtosaurus
        - - Tapuiasaurus
          - Rapetosaurus
      - Saltasauroidea
        - Diamantinasaurus
        - Baurutitan
        - Isisaurus
        - Saltasauridae
          - - Alamosaurus
            - Opisthocoelicaudia
          - - Neuquensaurus
            - Saltasaurus
        - Aeolosaurini
          - Maxakalisaurus
          - Panamericansaurus
          - Rinconsaurus
          - - Gondwanatitan
            - - Aeolosaurus maximus
              - - Aeolosaurus colhuehuapensis
                - Aeolosaurus rionegrinus

== See also ==
- Dinosaur Beds

== Footnotes ==
- S. H. Haughton. 1928. On some reptilian remains from the Dinosaur Beds of Nyasaland. Transactions of the Royal Society of South Africa 16:67-75
- Paul, Gregory S. (2010) The Princeton Field Guide to Dinosaurs.
- Tidwell, V., Carpenter, K. & Meyer, S. 2001. New Titanosauriform (Sauropoda) from the Poison Strip Member of the Cedar Mountain Formation (Lower Cretaceous), Utah. In: Mesozoic Vertebrate Life. D. H. Tanke & K. Carpenter (eds.). Indiana University Press, Eds. D.H. Tanke & K. Carpenter. Indiana University Press. 139-165.
