= Bemaraha Formation =

Geologic formation in Madagascar

- Stratigraphic range: Early Bajocian-Early Bathonian; ~170–168 Ma
- Type: Geological formation
- Unit of: Morondava Basin
- Underlies: Sakaraha Formation
- Overlies: Isalo III Formation

Lithology
- Primary: Lime mudstone
- Other: Grainstone, limestone

Location
- Coordinates: 19.2°S 45.0°E
- Approximate paleocoordinates: 24.9°S 21.8°E
- Region: Morondava District, Menabe
- Country: Madagascar
- Extent: ~300 km (190 mi)

Type section
- Named for: Tsingy de Bemaraha National Park
- Outcrops of the formation in Madagascar

The Bemaraha Formation is a Middle Jurassic (early Bajocian to early Bathonian) geological formation of the Morondava Basin of Madagascar. The lime mudstones, grainstones and limestones of the formation were deposited in lagoonal and reefal environments. Fossils of groups of invertebrates and theropod and sauropod tracks have been found in the formation. The Sahalaly River tracksite yielded a single trackway belonging to a quadrupedal dinosaur, possibly a sauropod. Sauropod tracks are rare, making up as little as 1 percent of the present sample. The best-preserved tracks are assigned to the ichnogenus Kayentapus.

== Description ==
The limestones of the Bemaraha Formation have been interpreted as a coastal barrier/lagoon complex of Middle Jurassic age (Bajocian, about 170 Ma). At that time, Madagascar had already separated from Africa, but was still attached to India and Antarctica. Since Antarctica was connected to southern Africa, a land bridge really existed between Madagascar and all major southern hemisphere landmasses. Faunal exchanges were possible and endemism was probably very low. Madagascar was to become an island only some 80-90 million years later, during the Late Cretaceous. During Bajocian times, a narrow seaway stretched between eastern Africa and western Madagascar, much in the same position as today's Mozambique Channel. Along the shores of western Madagascar, coral reefs separated wide lagoons from the open sea. The remnants of this reef/lagoon complex is what today, after the coastline shifted several tens of kilometers westward, is seen in the limestones of the Bemaraha Formation.

The Bemaraha limestones stretches over an area of roughly 300 kilometres (190 mi), and are best exposed in the area between the towns of Bekopaka and Antsalova, in the northern half of the Morondava Basin. The outcropping limestones can roughly be divided into a western and an eastern belt with different facies.

In the western belt, the formation mainly consists of massive limestones with metre-scale bedding or no recognizable bedding at all. Oolites and fossils of reefal organisms (mainly corals) are common in places. This region is affected by the spectacular karst features known as "tsingy" and for this reason most of the area is part of the Tsingy de Bemaraha National Park, included in the UNESCO World Heritage Sites list. The facies in the eastern belt is made up mainly of fine-grained and well-bedded limestones with the average thickness of the individual beds being a few tens of centimeters. Beds are often laminated and invertebrate fossils (gastropods, bivalves, brachiopods, echinoids and isolated coral fragments) are common in some beds, while others are devoid of fossils.

In the south-western Majunga Basin, interbedded limestones and mudstones (shales and marls) above the Aalenian Sandstone were attributed to a Bajocian carbonate platform formed by the Bemaraha Formation. The carbonate platform at the Manambolo and Tsiribihina River gorges, which cut through the Bemaraha plateau, are likewise assigned to the Early Bajocian. At the eastern margin of the Bemaraha Plateau, the carbonate succession directly rests on Isalo sandstones. Farther south at Besabora (along National Road RN35), limestones with the foraminifera Mesoendothyra croatica and Protopeneroplis striata support a Middle Jurassic (Bajocian to Early Bathonian) age.

== See also ==
- List of stratigraphic units with dinosaur tracks
  - List of stratigraphic units with theropod tracks
  - List of stratigraphic units with sauropodomorph tracks
- List of fossiliferous stratigraphic units in Madagascar
- Geology of Madagascar
- Isalo III Formation
- Kandreho Formation
- Etjo Sandstone
