= List of fossiliferous stratigraphic units in Tanzania =

Major fossiliferous stratigraphic units in Tanzania
Olduvai Formation
Peninj Gorge Group
Pemba Formation
Wembere-Manonga Formation
Nsungwe Formation
Kilwa Group and Kingongo Marl
Galula Formation
Tendaguru Formation
Tanga Limestone
Manda Formation
Middle Tanga Formation
Hatambulo Formation

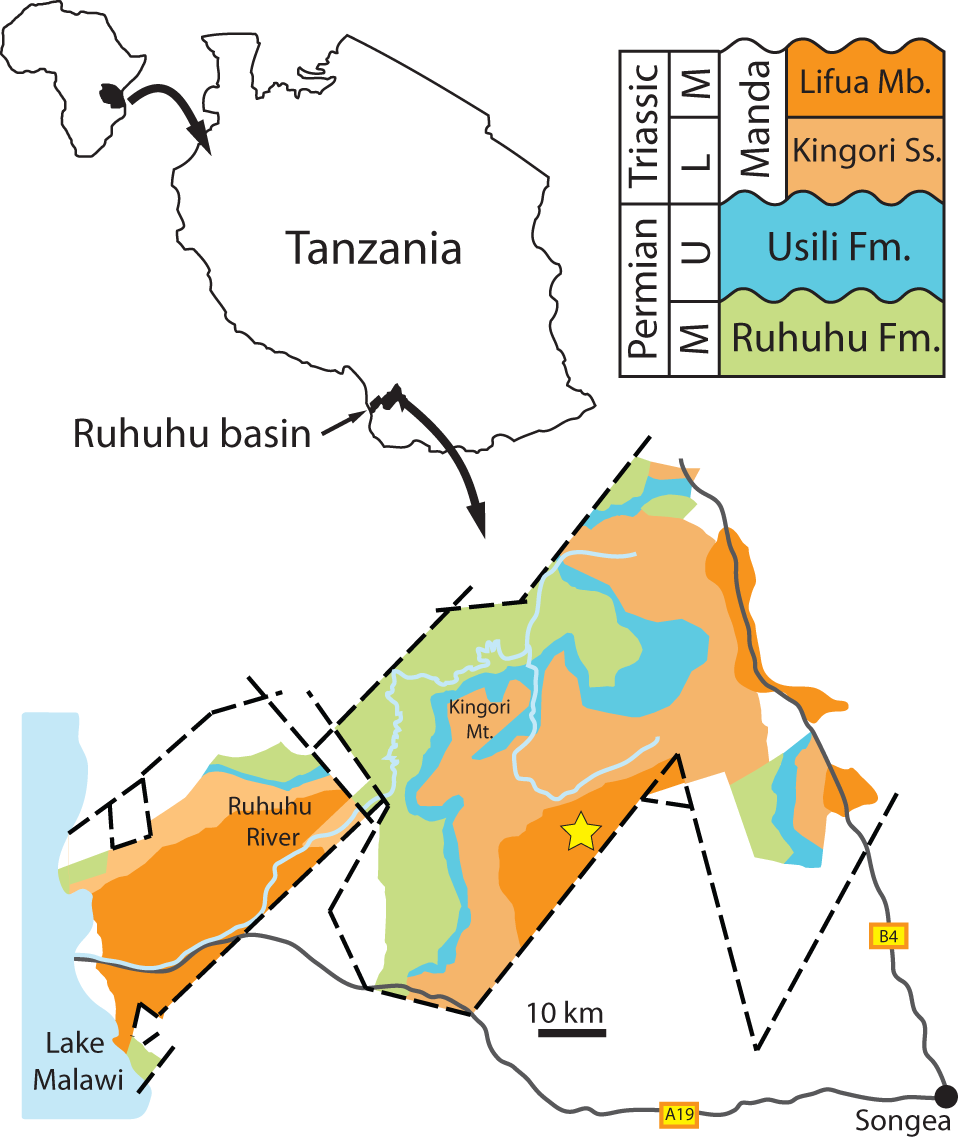
Map of the Ruhuhu Basin with Manda Formation in orange Usili Formation in blue Ruhuhu Formation in green

This is a list of fossiliferous stratigraphic units in Tanzania.

== List of fossiliferous stratigraphic units ==
Group	Formation	Period	Notes
	Mbuga Clays Formation	Pleistocene-Holocene	
Peninj Gorge	Humbu Formation	Gelasian-Calabrian	
Peninj Gorge	Sambu Lavas Formation	Zanclean-Calabrian	
Vogel River	Olduvai Formation	Pleistocene	
Vogel River		Zanclean-Gelasian	
Vogel River	Upper Laetolil Beds	Zanclean	
	Mikindani Formation	Messinian-Pliocene	
	Wembere-Manonga Formation	Miocene-Pliocene	
	Pemba Formation	Early-Middle Miocene	
	Masingini Formation	Early Miocene	
	Pugu Formation	Early Miocene	
Red Sandstone	Nsungwe Formation	Late Oligocene	
Red Sandstone	Galula Formation	Aptian-Campanian	
Kilwa	Kivinje Formation	Selandian	
Kilwa	Nangurukuru Formation	Santonian-late Campanian	
Kilwa	Lindi Formation	early Cenomanian-late Turonian	
	Kingongo Marl	early Cenomanian	
	Tendaguru Formation	Oxfordian-Berriasian	
	Tanga Limestone	Bathonian	
Songea	Manda Formation	Anisian	
Songea	Usili Formation	Lopingian	
Songea	Ruhuhu Formation	Wordian-Capitanian	
Beaufort	Middle Tanga Formation	Lopingian	
Karoo	Hatambulo Formation	Wordian-Changhsingian	

== See also ==
- Lists of fossiliferous stratigraphic units in Africa
  - List of fossiliferous stratigraphic units in the Democratic Republic of the Congo
  - List of fossiliferous stratigraphic units in Madagascar
  - List of fossiliferous stratigraphic units in Malawi
  - List of fossiliferous stratigraphic units in Mozambique
  - List of fossiliferous stratigraphic units in Seychelles
  - List of fossiliferous stratigraphic units in Zambia
- Geology of Tanzania
