= Kandreho Formation =

Early Jurassic geological formation of Madagascar

- Stratigraphic range: Toarcian; ~180–176 Ma
- Type: Geological formation

Lithology
- Primary: Marly limestone

Location
- Coordinates: 17.5°S 45.3°E
- Approximate paleocoordinates: 22.3°S 24.0°E
- Region: Mahajanga Province
- Country: Madagascar
- Extent: Mahajanga Basin

Type section
- Named for: Kandreho
- Named by: Geiger
- Year defined: 2004
- Kandreho Outcrop of the formation in Madagascar

The Kandreho Formation is an Early Jurassic (middle or late Toarcian) geological formation of the Mahajanga Basin of Madagascar. The marly limestones of the formation were deposited in a subtidal lagoonal environment. The formation overlies the Bouleiceras and Spiriferina beds of the early Toarcian and has been correlated to the Marrat Formation of Saudi Arabia. Fossils of the marine teleosaurid thalattosuchian as well as bivalves and the ammonite Nejdia have been found in the formation. The name Kandreho Formation was proposed by Geiger in 2004.

== Fossill content ==
Color key: Taxon / Reclassified taxon / Taxon falsely reported as present / Dubious taxon or junior synonym / Ichnotaxon / Ootaxon / Morphotaxon	Notes; Uncertain or tentative taxa are in small text; ~~crossed out~~ taxa are discredited.

=== Crocodylomorphs ===
Crocodylomorphs of the Kandreho Formation
Genus	Species	Location	Stratigraphic position	Material	Notes	Image
Teleosauridae Indet.	Indeterminate	Behazonaty	Toarcian	Upper jaw fragment	A teleosaurid thalattosuchian; originally known as "Steneosaurus".	

== See also ==
- List of fossiliferous stratigraphic units in Madagascar
- Geology of Madagascar
- Isalo III Formation
