= Ambolafotsy Formation =

Geologic formation in Madagascar

- Stratigraphic range: Turonian; ~93.52–89.77 Ma
- Type: Geological formation
- Unit of: Diego Basin
- Sub-units: Lower, Middle and Upper units

Lithology
- Primary: Claystone, shale, sandstone

Location
- Coordinates: 13.8°S 49.5°E
- Approximate paleocoordinates: 33.4°S 40.4°E
- Region: Antsiranana Province
- Country: Madagascar
- Location of the formation in Madagascar

The Ambolafotsy Formation is a Turonian aged geological formation in the Diego Basin of Antsiranana Province in Madagascar. It is a mostly terrestrial unit deposited during a marine regression close to the shoreline. The dinosaur Dahalokely has been discovered in the formation.

== Description ==
The section containing the Dahalokely site is informally termed the "Ambolafotsy Formation" and is divided into lower, middle (containing the type locality), and upper units. The lower unit has produced several biostratigraphically informative foraminifera, including Whiteinella aprica, W. baltica, Helvetoglobotruncana praehelvetica, and H. helvetica, and the nannofossil Quadrum gartneri, placing the sample within the Q. gartneri and H. helvetica zones. The upper unit contains the ammonite Subprionocyclus neptuni.

The sediments of most of the middle unit of the Ambolafotsy Formation are interpreted as terrestrial, deposited during a marine regression. Carbonized plant fragments are quite common in the middle unit, along with claystones, shales, and cross-bedded sandstones. Marine microfossils and macrofossils are generally absent, although a deposit of ostreids several meters above the type locality for Dahalokely suggests that the area was deposited close to the shoreline.

== See also ==
- List of fossiliferous stratigraphic units in Madagascar
- Geology of Madagascar
