= Ankarafantsika Formation =

Geologic formation in Madagascar

- Stratigraphic range: Cenomanian
- Type: Geological formation
- Underlies: Basalt

Lithology
- Primary: Sandstone

Location
- Coordinates: 16.4°S 46.9°E
- Approximate paleocoordinates: 37.8°S 36.6°E
- Region: Boeny, Mahajanga Province
- Country: Madagascar
- Extent: Mahajanga Basin

Type section
- Named for: Ankarafantsika National Park
- Location of the formation in Madagascar

The Ankarafantsika Formation is a Late Cretaceous (Cenomanian) geologic formation of the Mahajanga Basin in the Boeny region of Madagascar, Africa. The fine-grained sandstones of the formation were deposited in a fluvial to lacustrine environment.

== Fossil content ==
The following fossils have been reported from the formation:

Color key: Taxon / Reclassified taxon / Taxon falsely reported as present / Dubious taxon or junior synonym / Ichnotaxon / Ootaxon / Morphotaxon	Notes; Uncertain or tentative taxa are in small text; ~~crossed out~~ taxa are discredited.

=== Dinosaurs ===
==== Sauropods ====
Sauropods of the Ankarafantsika Formation
Genus	Species	Location	Stratigraphic position	Material	Notes	Image
Sauropoda indet.	Indeterminate				An indeterminate sauropod	

== See also ==
- List of dinosaur-bearing rock formations
- List of stratigraphic units with indeterminate dinosaur fossils
- List of fossiliferous stratigraphic units in Madagascar
- Geology of Madagascar
