= Ambondromahabo =

- Village
- Location in Madagascar
- Country: Madagascar
- Region: Boeny
- District: Ambato-Boeni
- Municipality: Ambondromamy
- Time zone: UTC3 (EAT)
- Postal code: 403

Ambondromahabo is a village near Ambondromamy, Boeny, Madagascar.

An extinct mammal from the Jurassic period, Ambondro mahabo, is named after the village, which is close to the locality within the Isalo III geological formation where the fossil was found.
