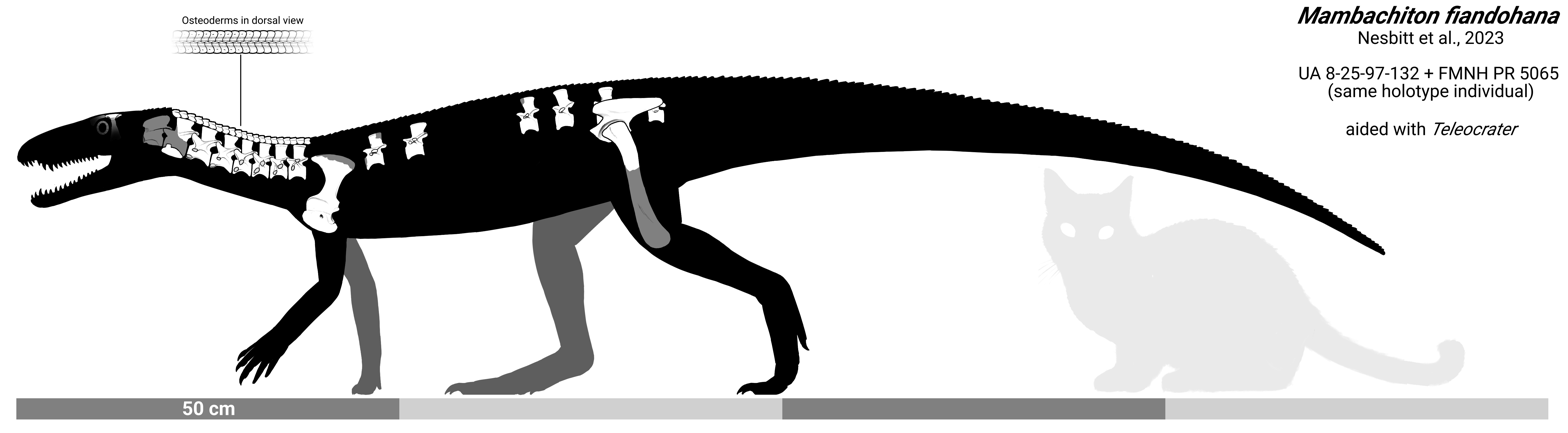
- Skeletal reconstruction (known remains in white)

Scientific classification
- Kingdom: Animalia
- Phylum: Chordata
- Class: Reptilia
- Clade: Eucrocopoda
- Clade: Archosauria
- Clade: Avemetatarsalia
- Genus: †Mambachiton; Nesbitt et al., 2023
- Species: †M. fiandohana

Binomial name
- †Mambachiton fiandohana Nesbitt et al., 2023

= Mambachiton =

Mambachiton Temporal range: Middle/Late Triassic, Ladinian–Carnian

Genus of basal avemetatarsalians

Mambachiton (meaning "crocodile armour") is an extinct genus of basal avemetatarsalian from the Middle/Upper Triassic Makay Formation (Isalo II beds) of Madagascar. The genus contains a single species, M. fiandohana, known from a partial skeleton with articulated osteoderms.

== Discovery and naming ==
The Mambachiton fossil specimens were discovered in sediments of the Makay Formation near Sakaraha in the southern Morondava Basin of Madagascar, and excavated later in 1997, 1998, and 2003. The holotype specimen, UA 8-25-97-132, consists of an articulated series of cervical vertebrae with associated osteoderms, a cervical rib, and a nearly-complete right postfrontal. An additional referred specimen, FMNH PR 5065, was found near the holotype and includes dorsal, sacral, and caudal vertebrae, both scapulocoracoids, the right ilium, and a partial femur.

The specimen was first mentioned in a 2019 abstract. In 2023, Nesbitt et al. described Mambachiton fiandohana as a new genus and species of avemetatarsalian archosaurs based on these fossil remains. The generic name, "Mambachiton", combines the Swahili word "mamba", meaning "crocodile" with the Ancient Greek "khiton" ("χιτών"), meaning "a suit of armour". The name also references chiton molluscs, as the armour of Mambachiton superficially resembles that of polyplacophorans. The specific name, "fiandohana", is derived from a Malagasy word meaning "source" or "beginning", as Mambachiton is phylogenetically close to the crocodile-bird split.

== Description ==
Size of Mambachiton compared to a human

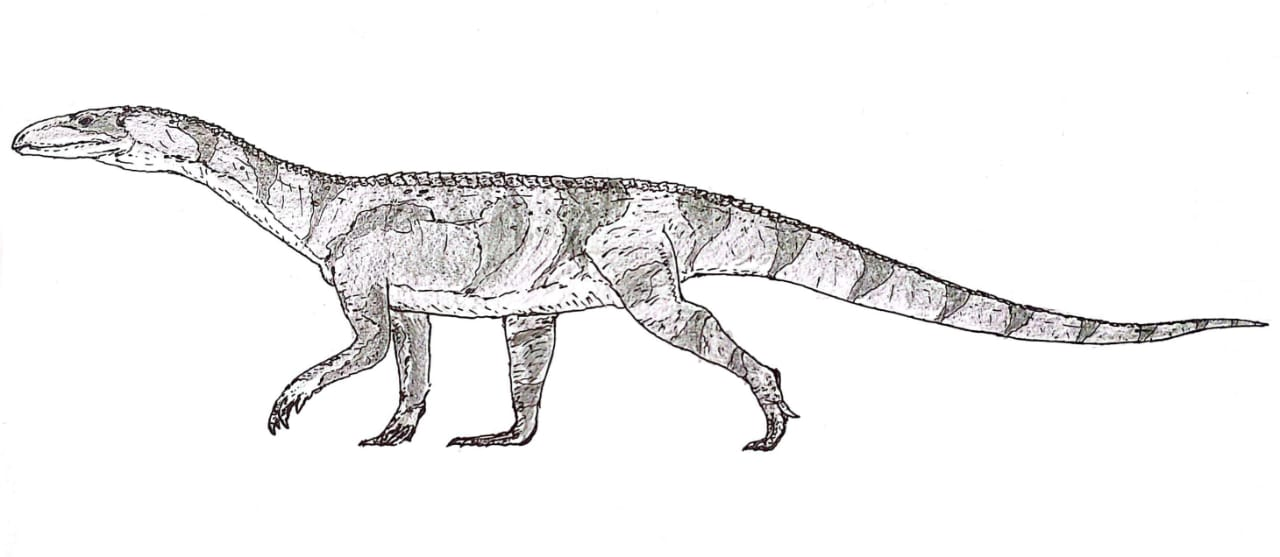
Speculative life restoration

Mambachiton was a similar size to the Tanzanian aphanosaur Teleocrater. Osteoderms were found articulated with the fossilized vertebrae of Mambachiton, including three pairs of osteoderms above each cervical vertebra. The cervical vertebrae were relatively elongated, but not as much compared to those of Teleocrater

== Classification ==
Nesbitt et al. (2023) recovered Mambachiton as the earliest diverging member of Avemetatarsalia. They specifically noted that it lacks multiple characters of the minimally inclusive clade containing aphanosaurs and ornithodirans, and is thus nested outside of that clade. Preliminary analyses considered Mambachiton to be a basal poposauroid (a clade of pseudosuchians), though the later recognition of aphanosaurs as early-diverging avemetatarsalians corrected this view. The results of the phylogenetic analyses of Nesbit et al. are shown in the cladogram below:

- Archosauria
  - Pseudosuchia
  - Avemetatarsalia
    - Mambachiton
    - - Aphanosauria
      - Ornithodira
        - - Lagerpetidae
          - Pterosauria
        - - Lagosuchus
          - - Silesauridae
            - Dinosauria

In the preliminary results of their novel phylogenetic analyses, Garcia & Müller (2025) did not exclude the possibility that Mambachiton was a member of the Aphanosauria; depending on the analysis constraints, it was recovered within a polytomic Aphanosauria, within a polyphyletic Aphanosauria in a clade including Teleocrater and Spondylosoma, or as the sister taxon to Dinosauriformes within the Dinosauromorpha.

== Paleoenvironment ==
Mambachiton was discovered in layers of Isalo II, also referred to as the Makay Formation, which dates to the Middle/Late Triassic period (Ladinian–Carnian ages), though the exact numerical age is currently unknown. The traversodontids Menadon and Dadadon, the rhynchosaur Isalorhynchus, and the lagerpetid Kongonaphon have also been described from the type locality, as well as the remains of unnamed reptiles, synapsids, and possibly amphibians.
