= List of fossiliferous stratigraphic units in Madagascar =

Fossiliferous stratigraphic units in Madagascar
Cretaceous
Jurassic
Triassic
Permian

Several fossiliferous stratigraphic units in Madagascar have provided fossils, most notably the Maastrichtian Maevarano Formation and the Jurassic Isalo III Formation. The oldest fossil-bearing formations date to ages before the break-up of Madagascar from Africa and India; the units of the Sakoa Group are found in both India and Madagascar, while the Beaufort Group is shared with southern Africa.

Group	Formation	Period	Stage	Notes
	Berivotra Formation	Cretaceous	Maastrichtian	
	Maevarano Formation	Cretaceous	Maastrichtian	
	Ankazomihaboka Formation	Cretaceous	Coniacian	
	Ambolafotsy Formation	Cretaceous	Turonian	
	Ankarafantsika Formation	Cretaceous	Cenomanian	
	Kandreho Formation	Jurassic	Middle or Late Toarcian	
	Bemaraha Formation	Jurassic	Early Bajocian-Early Bathonian	
Isalo Group	Isalo III Formation	Jurassic	Bajocian-Bathonian	
Isalo Group	Isalo II Formation	Triassic	Ladinian-Carnian	
Isalo Group	Isalo I Formation	Triassic	~Middle–Late Triassic	
Sakamena Group	Upper Sakamena Formation	Triassic	~Middle Triassic	
Sakamena Group	Middle Sakamena Formation	Triassic	Induan	
Sakamena Group	Lower Sakamena Formation	Permian	Capitanian-Wuchiapingian	
Beaufort Group		Permian	Capitanian	
Sakoa Group	Sakoa Formation	Permian	Sakmarian-Artinskian	
Sakoa Group	Karharbari Formation	Permian	Sakmarian-Artinskian	
Sakoa Group	Talchir Formation	Permian	Asselian-Sakmarian	

== See also ==
- Lists of fossiliferous stratigraphic units in Africa
  - List of fossiliferous stratigraphic units in Mozambique
  - List of fossiliferous stratigraphic units in Seychelles
  - List of fossiliferous stratigraphic units in South Africa
- Geology of Madagascar
