= Ankazomihaboka Formation =

Geologic formation in Madagascar

- Stratigraphic range: Coniacian; ~89–86 Ma
- Type: Geological formation
- Underlies: Marovoay Beds
- Overlies: Basalt

Lithology
- Primary: Claystone, sandstone

Location
- Coordinates: 16.2°S 46.7°E
- Approximate paleocoordinates: 34.9°S 37.8°E
- Region: Boeny, Mahajanga Province
- Country: Madagascar
- Extent: Mahajanga Basin
- Location of the formation in Madagascar

The Ankazomihaboka Formation is a Coniacian geologic formation in the Mahajanga Basin of northwestern Madagascar. The formation comprises claystones and sandstones deposited in a fluvial to lacustrine environment. The formation is overlain by the Marovoay Beds and overlies basalt.

Dinosaur remains diagnostic to the genus level are among the fossils that have been recovered from the formation.

== Fossil content ==
- "Titanosaurus" madagascariensis
- Majungasaurus crenatissimus (theropod indet.)
- Axelrodichthys sp.
- Ferganoceratodus madagascariensis

== See also ==
- List of dinosaur-bearing rock formations
  - List of stratigraphic units with few dinosaur genera
- List of fossiliferous stratigraphic units in Madagascar
- Geology of Madagascar
