= Microsuchus =

Microsuchus Temporal range: Santonian ~85.8–84.9 Ma

Scientific classification
- Domain: Eukaryota
- Kingdom: Animalia
- Phylum: Chordata
- Class: Reptilia
- Clade: Archosauria
- Clade: Pseudosuchia
- Clade: Crocodylomorpha
- Clade: Crocodyliformes
- Clade: †Notosuchia
- Genus: †Microsuchus; De Saez, 1928

Type species
- †Microsuchus schilleri De Saez, 1928

Extinct genus of reptiles

Microsuchus is an extinct genus of mesoeucrocodylians, belonging to Notosuchia. Fossils have been found in the Bajo de la Carpa Formation, dating to the Santonian stage of the Late Cretaceous.

== Classification ==
Originally classified as a goniopholidid on the basis of the platycoelous vertebral centra, Microsuchus was recently redescribed and recovered as either a neosuchian or notosuchian. Diagnostic features include the presence of a bulge lateral to the prezygapophyses of the second sacral vertebra, elongated posterior zeugopodia, and proximal caudal centra with a triangular cross section. A 2017 cladistic analysis of Razanandrongobe further clarified the phylogenetic position of Microsuchus by recovering it as a primitive notosuchian.
