= Ambondromamy =

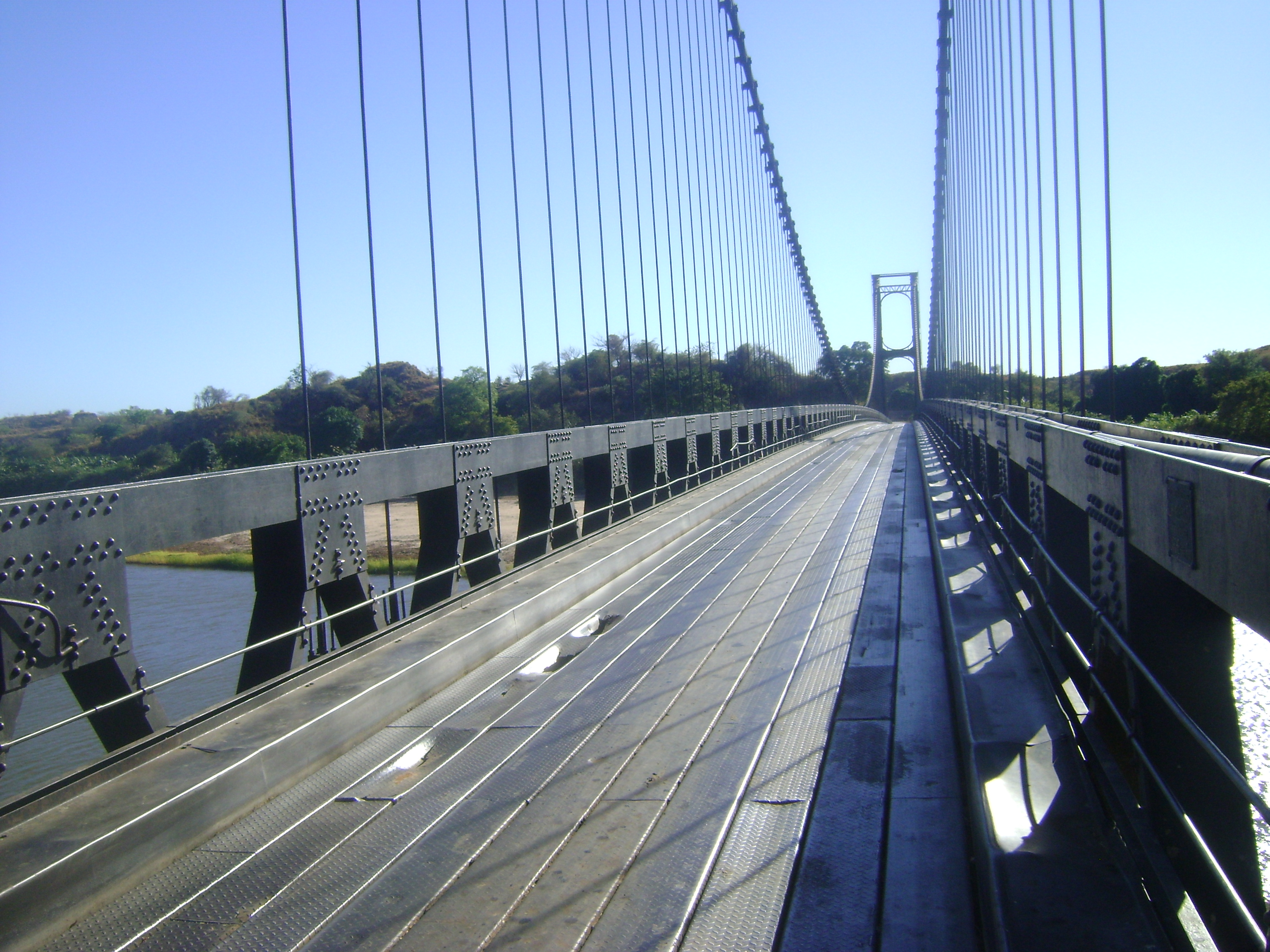
- Bridge of the Kamoro river

- Location in Madagascar
- Coordinates: 16°26′S 47°9′E
- Country: Madagascar
- Region: Boeny
- District: Ambato-Boeni
- Elevation: 43 m (141 ft)

Population (2001)
  - Total: 8,000
- Time zone: UTC3 (EAT)
- Postal code: 403

Ambondromamy is a rural municipality in Madagascar. It belongs to the district of Ambato-Boeni, which is a part of Boeny Region. The population of the commune was estimated to be approximately 8,000 in 2001 commune census.

Primary and junior level secondary education are available in town. The majority 60% of the population of the commune are farmers, while an additional 30% receives their livelihood from raising livestock. The most important crop is peanuts, while other important products are maize and sweet potatoes. Services provide employment for 5% of the population. Additionally fishing employs 5% of the population.

== Geography ==
Ambondromamy is situated at the intersection of the Route nationale 6 (to Diego Suarez - 706 km) and RN 4 (Mahajanga - Antananarivo (450km)).

== Fossils ==
Some species of dinausaurs and fossils of a kind of praehistoric crocodile (Razanandrongobe sakalavae) were discovered in Ambondromamy and Ambondromahabo, a village that belongs to this municipality.
