= List of fossiliferous stratigraphic units in Seychelles =

Fossiliferous stratigraphic units in Seychelles
Aldabra, Esprit & Takamaka Limestones

This is a list of fossiliferous stratigraphic units in Seychelles.

Formation	Member	Period	Notes
	Aldabra Limestone	Late Pleistocene	
	Esprit Limestone	Late Pleistocene	
	Takamaka Limestone	Late Pleistocene	

== See also ==
- Lists of fossiliferous stratigraphic units in Africa
  - List of fossiliferous stratigraphic units in Madagascar
- Geology of Seychelles
