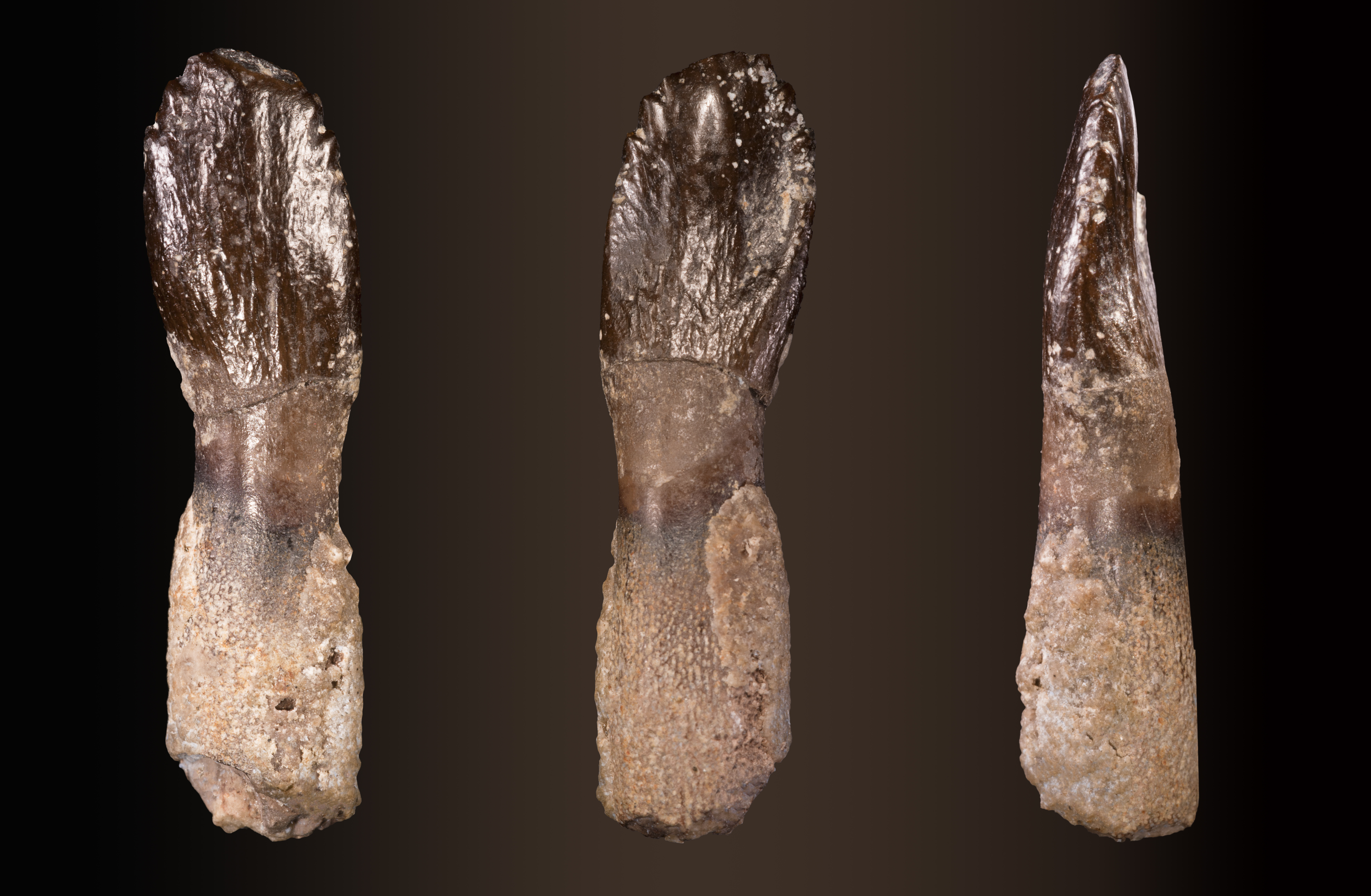
- Multiple views of a tooth

Scientific classification
- Kingdom: Animalia
- Phylum: Chordata
- Class: Reptilia
- Clade: Dinosauria
- Clade: Saurischia
- Clade: †Sauropodomorpha
- Clade: †Sauropoda
- Genus: †Archaeodontosaurus; Buffetaut, 2005
- Species: †A. descouensi

Binomial name
- †Archaeodontosaurus descouensi Buffetaut, 2005

= Archaeodontosaurus =

Archaeodontosaurus Temporal range: Bajocian-Bathonian ~168–165 Ma

Sauropod dinosaur genus from Middle Jurassic Madagascar

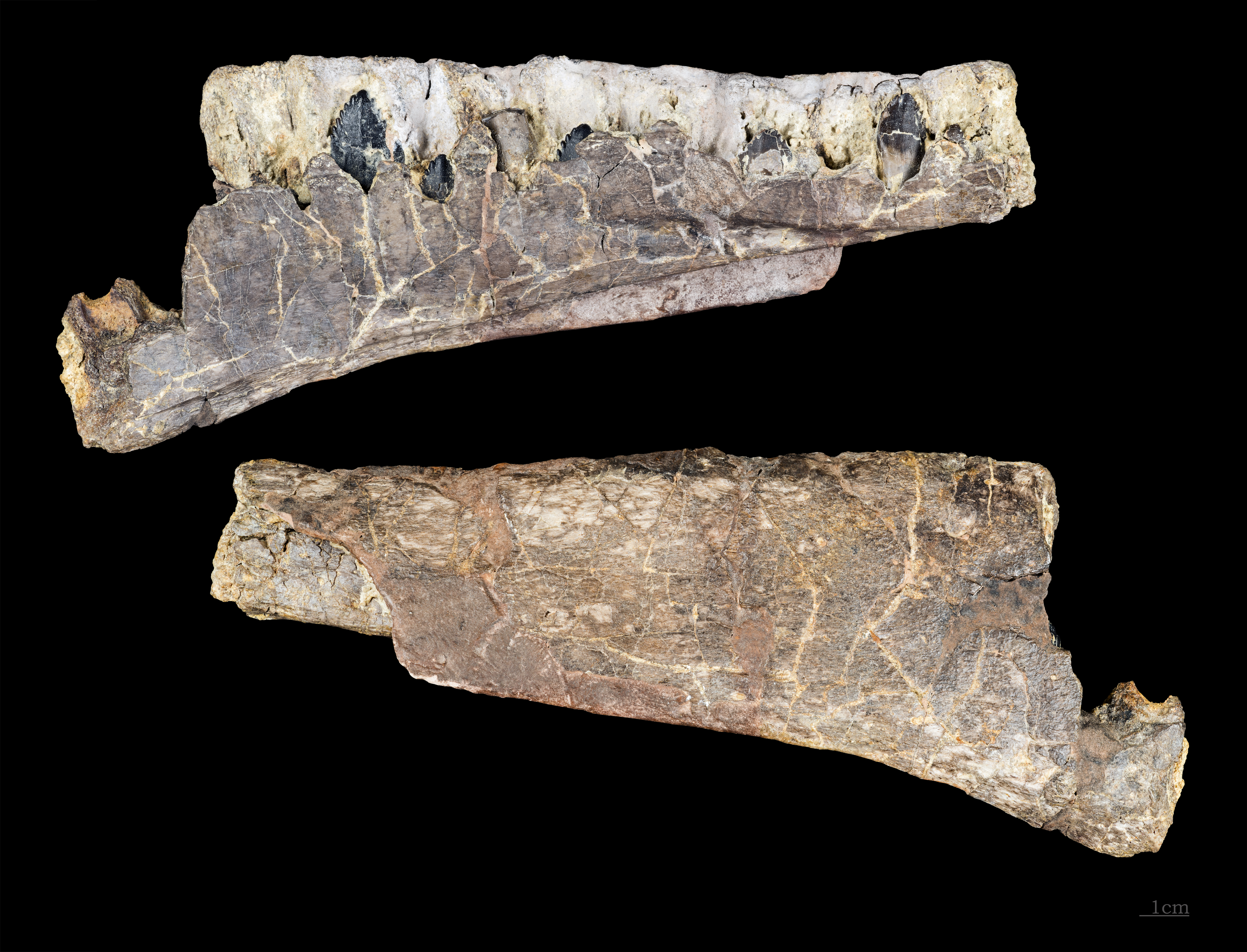
Archaeodontosaurus descouensi right mandible

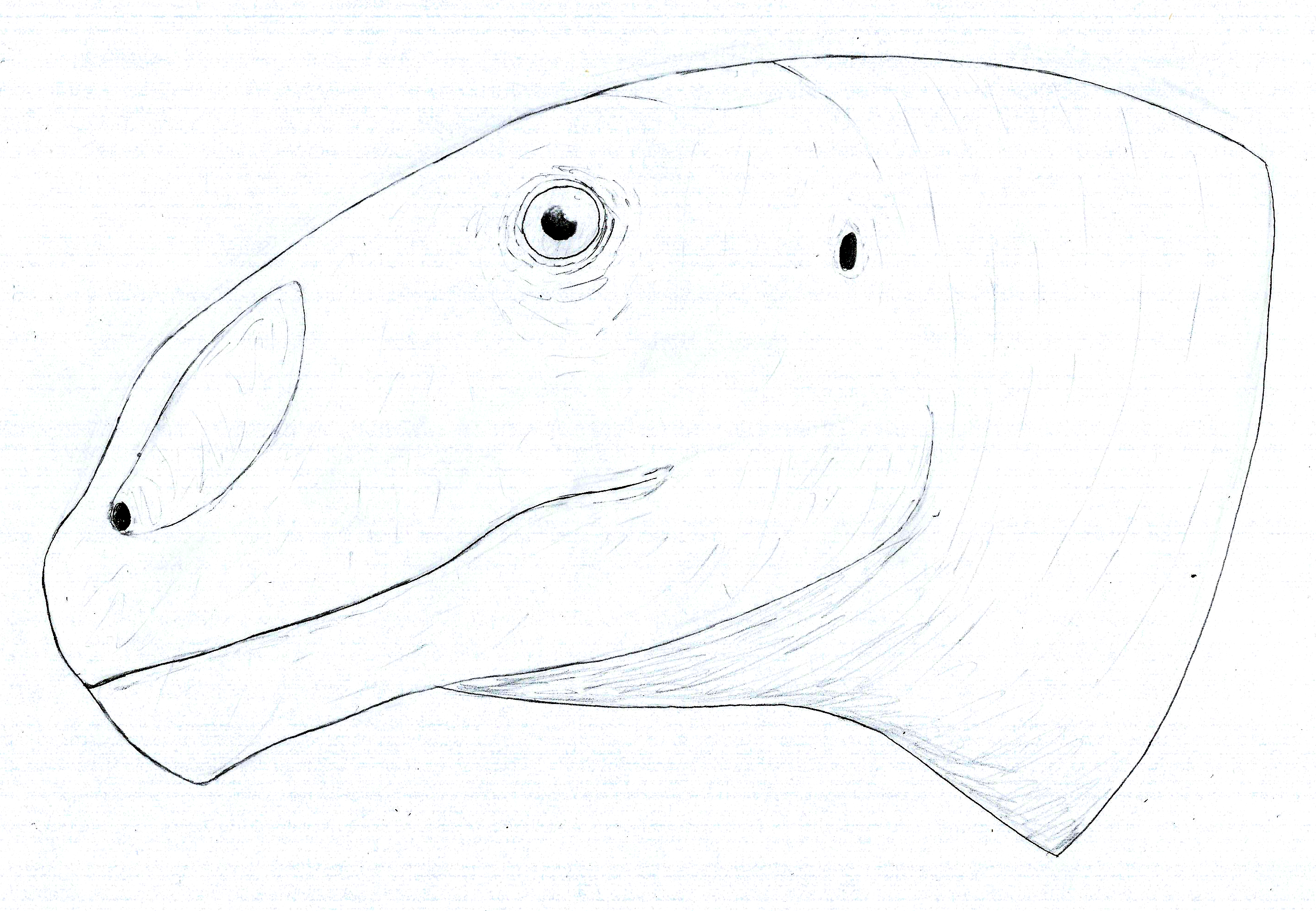
Hypothetical reconstruction

Archaeodontosaurus ("ancient-toothed lizard") is a genus of sauropod dinosaur from the Middle Jurassic. Its fossils were found in the Isalo III Formation of Madagascar. The type species, Archaeodontosaurus descouensi, was described in September 2005. The specific name honours the collector, Didier Descouens. It is a probable sauropod, with prosauropod-like teeth. It may be a basal member of Gravisauria.
