= Menadon =

Menadon Temporal range: Late Triassic ~235–222 Ma

Scientific classification
- Kingdom: Animalia
- Phylum: Chordata
- Clade: Synapsida
- Clade: Therapsida
- Clade: Cynodontia
- Family: †Traversodontidae
- Subfamily: †Gomphodontosuchinae
- Genus: †Menadon; Flynn et al. 2000
- Species: †M. besairiei

Binomial name
- †Menadon besairiei Flynn et al. 2000

Extinct genus of cynodonts

Menadon is an extinct genus of traversodontid cynodonts. The type and only species is Menadon besairiei.

Fossils of Menadon were first found in Isalo II (the Makay Formation) of Madagascar, which preserves sediments from the Middle to Late Triassic period. They have also been recovered from the Santa Maria Formation of the Paraná Basin near Santa Cruz do Sul in Rio Grande do Sul, Brazil.

Menadon was unique among non-mammalian synapsids for the presence of hypsodont (high-crowned) postcanine teeth. Hypsodont teeth grow continuously to counteract high wear caused by a diet of abrasive plant material. Menadon's teeth convergently resemble those of hypsodont xenarthrans such as sloths and armadillos, due to their column-like form and dentine which grows from the crown towards the root.
