= Isalo III Formation =

Geological formation in Madagascar

- Stratigraphic range: Bathonian-Callovian; ~168–165 Ma
- Type: Geological formation
- Sub-units: Isalo IIIa or Beronono Formation; Isalo IIIb or Sakaraha Formation
- Overlies: Isalo II Formation (unconformity)

Lithology
- Primary: Sandstone
- Other: Claystone, marl

Location
- Coordinates: 16.6°S 47.0°E
- Approximate paleocoordinates: 23.9°S 25.1°E
- Region: Mahajanga & Fianarantsoa Provinces
- Country: Madagascar
- Extent: Mahajanga Basin

The Isalo III Formation is a geological formation in Madagascar, off the eastern coast of Africa. It dates back to the Middle Jurassic. The use of the term "Isalo III" is somewhat controversial as the two prior units Isalo I and II are Triassic cross-bedded sandstone units that form a continuous depositional sequence, while the "Isalo III" sandstones are not part of the same depositional sequence, and were deposited considerably later. and are perhaps better treated as part of several separate formations. It is traditionally divided into two subunits the lower, Bajocian aged Isalo IIIa unit also known as the Beronono Formation and the upper, Bathonian aged Isalo IIIb unit also known as the Sakaraha Formation or Sakahara Formation. The Sakaraha Formation consists of sandstones, marls and carbonates and represents a coastal plain environment, and is laterally equivalent to the predominantly carbonate Bemaraha Formation, which represents a coastal barrier lagoon complex. The formation is found in the northwest and in the southeast of the country and has provided a variety of fossils.

== Fossil content ==
Pterosaur teeth referred to Rhamphorhynchoidea are known from the formation.

Color key: Taxon / Reclassified taxon / Taxon falsely reported as present / Dubious taxon or junior synonym / Ichnotaxon / Ootaxon / Morphotaxon

Notes
Uncertain or tentative taxa are in small text
~~crossed out~~ taxa are discredited.

=== Dinosaurs ===
==== Sauropods ====
Sauropods of the Isalo III Formation
| Genus | Species | Location | Stratigraphic position | Material | Notes | Images |
|---|---|---|---|---|---|---|
| Archaeodontosaurus | A. descouensi | Ambondromamy, Majunga | | Teeth and mandible | A eusauropod sauropod | |
| Lapparentosaurus | L. madagascariensis | Faritany Majunga | | "More than [four] partial skeletons lacking skulls and teeth" | A cetiosaurid sauropod | |
| Narindasaurus | N. thevenini | Ankinganivalaka | | Right tibia, left pubis, caudal vertebrae, right fibula | A turiasaurian sauropod | |
| ?Diplodocoidea indet. | Indeterminate | IIIb | Teeth | | | |
| ?Titanosaurifomes indet. | Indeterminate | IIIb | Teeth | | | |

==== Theropoda ====
Theropods of the Isalo III Formation
| Genus | Species | Location | Stratigraphic position | Material | Notes | Images |
|---|---|---|---|---|---|---|
| Abelisauridae indet. | Indeterminate | IIIb | | MSNM V5778, V5779, V5781, V5789, V5799, V5809; FC-DPV 3531; PVL 3672, 515 4062-1 to 4062-4, 4173, 4174, 4175; NHMUK R4190 - all isolated shed crowns | The earliest record of Abelisauridae | |
| Theropoda indet. | Indeterminate | IIIb | | MSNM V6234 "a large, serrated tooth crown" MSNM V5804 vertebra, isolated teeth representing 8 morphotypes | | |
| Ceratosauria indet. | Indeterminate | IIIb | | MSNM V6235 Pedal ungual | | |

=== Crocodyliformes ===
Crocodyliformes of the Isalo III Formation
| Genus | Species | Location | Stratigraphic position | Material | Notes | Images |
|---|---|---|---|---|---|---|
| Andrianavoay | A. baroni | IIIb | | | A machimosaurine thelattosuchian | |
| Razanandrongobe | R. sakalavae | IIIb | | | A notosuchian | |

== See also ==
- List of dinosaur-bearing rock formations
- List of fossiliferous stratigraphic units in Madagascar
- Geology of Madagascar
