= Isalo II =

Informal Triassic geological unit in Madagascar

Isalo II Formation
- Stratigraphic range: Ladinian-Carnian
- Type: Geological formation
- Unit of: Isalo Group
- Underlies: Isalo III Formation (unconformity)
- Overlies: Isalo I Formation

Lithology
- Primary: Sandstone, mudstone

Location
- Coordinates: 20.3°S 45.4°E
- Approximate paleocoordinates: 23.1°S 24.7°E
- Region: Mahajanga & Toliara Provinces
- Country: Madagascar
- Extent: Morondava Basin, Mahajanga Basin
- Isalo II (Madagascar)

Isalo II, also known as the Makay Formation, is an informal Triassic geological unit in Madagascar.

It is described as "thick beds of mottled red or green clays associated with soft cross-bedded sandstones, light in colour and much finer-grained than the Isalo I sandstones." It is prominent in the Makay Massif.

== Fossil content ==
=== Amphibians ===
Amphibians
Taxon	Material	Notes
Metoposauridae indet.	An interclavicle, skull fragments, and intercentra	Indeterminate metoposaurid remains similar to those of Indian metoposaurids. Some fossils were the basis for the dubious species "Metoposaurus hoffmani". May be from Isalo II or III.
Stereospondyli indet.	Interclavicles	Indeterminate stereospondyl remains. May be from Isalo II or III.

=== Reptiles ===
Synapsids
Taxon	Material	Notes
Archosauriformes sp.	Teeth, a coracoid, a centrum fragment, and cranial fragments	Various indeterminate fragments, some of which may belong to dinosaurs.
Azendohsaurus madagaskarensis	Numerous skulls and postcranial fossils	An allokotosaurian archosauromorph, originally mistakenly identified as a "prosauropod" dinosaur.
Isalorhynchus genovefae	Numerous fossils representing parts of the skull and postcrania	A rhynchosaur sometimes considered a species of Hyperodapedon. Possibly represents two taxa. Reported sphenodontian fossils are most likely juvenile rhynchosaurs instead.
Kongonaphon kely	A maxilla and postcranial material	A tiny lagerpetid avemetatarsalian
Mambachiton fiandohana	A partial skeleton	An armored basal avemetatarsalian
Phytosauria indet.	Teeth	Similar to Rutiodon teeth.
Procolophonidae sp.	A jaw fragment and other remains	An unnamed procolophonid parareptile
Pseudosuchia indet.	Osteoderms	Likely referable to stagonolepid aetosaurs, though similar to goniopholidid crocodylomorphs as well.
Silesauridae sp.		An unnamed silesaurid dinosauromorph

=== Synapsids ===
Synapsids
Taxon	Material	Notes
Chiniquodon kalanoro	Part of a jaw	A chiniquodontid cynodont
Dadadon isaloi	Several skulls and jaw fragments	A massetognathine traversodontid cynodont
Kannemeyeriiformes sp.		An unnamed kannemeyeriiform dicynodont
Menadon besairiei	Skulls, jaws, and postcranial material	A traversodontid cynodont
