= Geology of Madagascar =

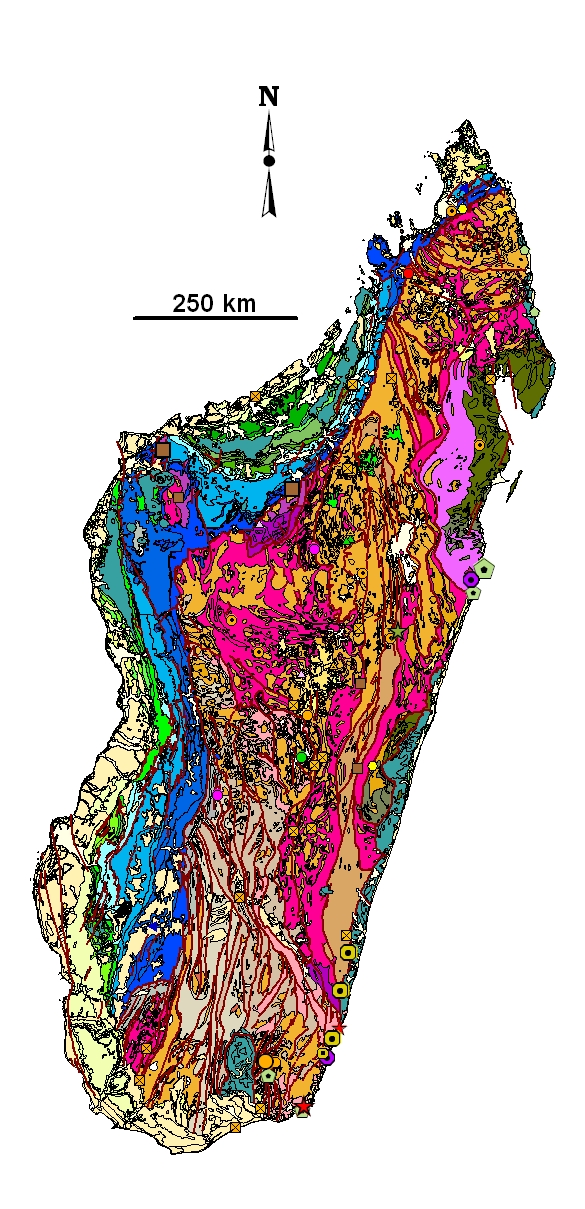
Geologic map of Madagascar

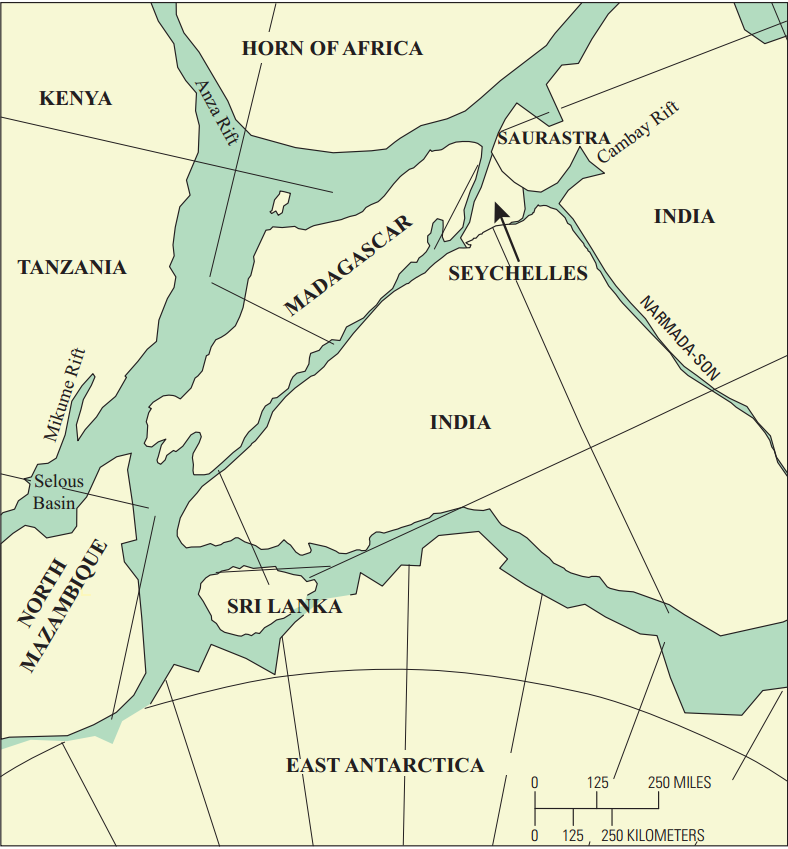
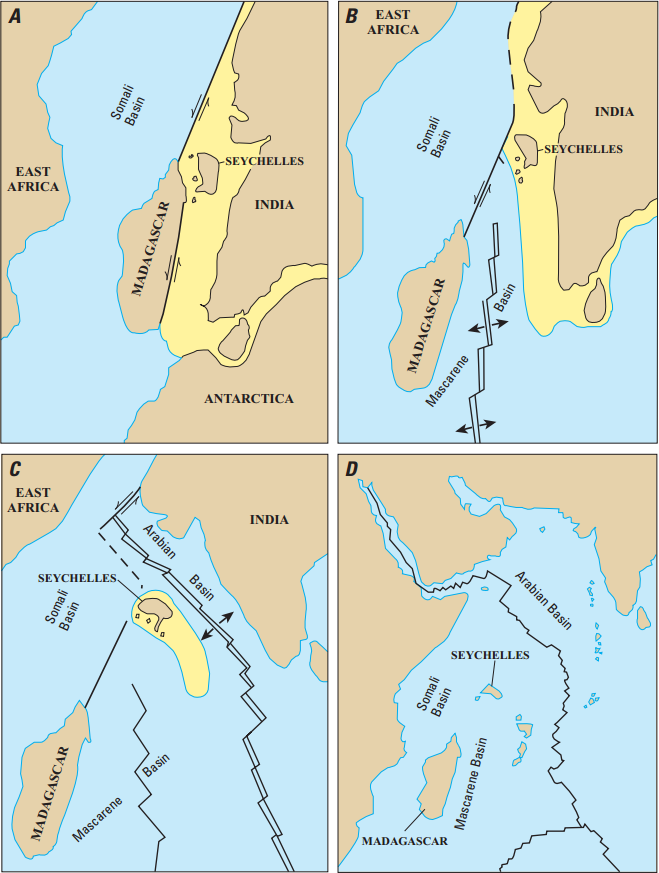
Early Jurassic breakup of Gondwana (left) and A- Early Cretaceous, B- Late Cretaceous, C-Paleocene, D- Present Day (right)

The geology of Madagascar comprises a variety of rocks of Precambrian age which make up the larger part of the east and centre of the island. They are intruded by basalts and rhyolites of Mesozoic to Cenozoic age. In contrast, the western part of the island is formed from sedimentary rocks of Carboniferous to Quaternary age. Archean rocks occur from the northeast portion of the island down to the south in the Ranotsara shear zone. Rocks in the northern portion of Madagascar are greenstone belts, from the Archean or Paleoproterozoic age.

== Summary ==
The center and eastern portions of the island consist primarily of metamorphic and igneous Precambrian basement granites, migmatites, and schists, ranging in age from 3 billion to 550 million years old. They are mostly overlain by laterite clays. The Itremo Massif consists of quartzite and marble outcrops 630 million years in age. The Morondava, Mahajanga and Ambilobe sedimentary basins occur along the western third of the island, and consist of terrestrial deposits that range in age from 350 million years ago to recent times. The western margins of Madagascar include Mesozoic and Tertiary limestones. These outcrop in the Ankarana and Bemaraha Massifs, Namoroka, Analamerana, and Ankara Plateau (172-162 million years in age), and the Mahafaly Plateau (54-38 million years in age) respectively. Flood basalts that ring Madagascar include the Mahajanga lavas (87.6 to 88.5 million years in age), the Toliara lavas and Ejeda-Bekily dike swarm (84.5-84.8 million years old), and the Androy lava flow (84.4 million years in age). These igneous rocks were emplaced during the interval when India and Madagascar were together (91 million years ago), and when apart (84 million years ago). More recent volcanic activity includes the formation of the Ankaratra Massif over the past 5 million years, and Montagne d'Ambre, which erupted from 50 to 2 million years ago.

== Tectonics ==
A NW-SE trending sinistral shear belt separates northern and southern crustal terranes. The Ampanihy ductile shear zone was created by flattening events associated with granulite metamorphism, isoclinal folding, flattened sheaths, steep to vertical foliations and sheath-like geometry of massif-type anorthosite bodies.

== Paleontology ==
- The Maevarano Formation, dated to late Maastrichtian age, has provided a diverse faunal assemblage, including the giant frog Beelzebufo, gondwanathere mammals, dinosaurs, crocodylians and other groups.
- The Middle Jurassic Isalo III Formation contains fossil dinosaurs.
- Typical Gondwanan flora of Glossopteris is found in the Permian formations in Madagascar.
- The four main Mesozoic sedimentary basins, the Diego Basin, the Majunga Basin, the Morondava Basin and the eastern coast Basin, contain a variety of ammonite faunas from the Permian–Triassic, the Jurassic and the Cretaceous.

== Economic geology ==
Madagascar is the world's leading producer of many colored gemstones, including sapphires, rubies, multi-coloured tourmalines, emeralds, amethysts, cordierites, aquamarines and garnets. Madagascar is also a major source of graphite, making it the second-largest producer in Africa. Additionally, Madagascar is Africa's third leading producer of chromite. Titanium oxide is found in significant quantities in beach sands located near Toalagnaro, however, 75% of the coastal forest zone in that area would have to be destroyed in order to exploit it, which has not been done.

Huge oil fields lie to the west of Madagascar, however they would require steam injection to extract, which is both technologically difficult and expensive. The oil fields of Tsimiroro and Bemolanga are estimated to hold combined reserves of 11.5 billion barrels.

== See also ==
- Madagascar Plate
- Geology of India
- Geology of Mozambique
- Geology of South Africa
