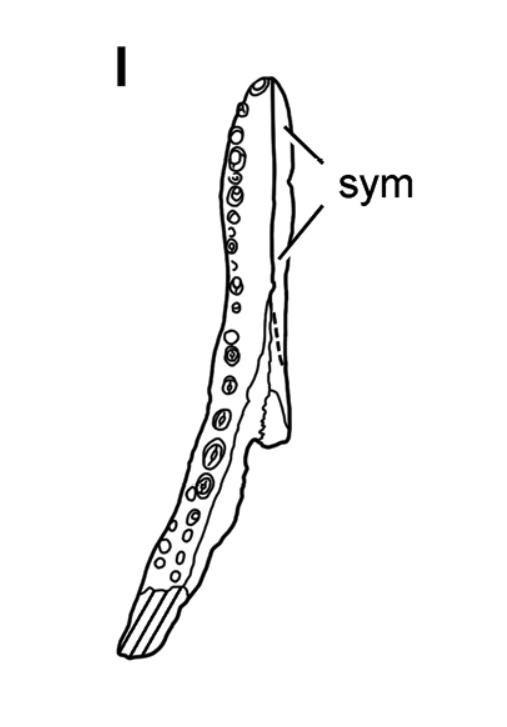
- Specimen MNHN-INA 25, the holotype of Fortignathus

Scientific classification
- Kingdom: Animalia
- Phylum: Chordata
- Class: Reptilia
- Clade: Pseudosuchia
- Clade: Crocodylomorpha
- Clade: †Notosuchia
- Family: †Itasuchidae
- Genus: †Fortignathus; Young et al., 2016
- Species: †F. felixi

Binomial name
- †Fortignathus felixi (de Lapparent de Broin, 2002)

Synonyms
- Elosuchus felixi de Lapparent de Broin, 2002

= Fortignathus =

Fortignathus Temporal range: Cretaceous, ~Albian–Cenomanian

Extinct genus of crocodylomorph

Fortignathus is an extinct genus of crocodylomorph known from the Cretaceous Echkar Formation or Farak Formation in Niger. It is known from a limited amount of material, namely three incompletely preserved lower jaws that broadly indicate that the animal had a long and narrow snout. Fortignathus was originally described under the name Elosuchus felixi by France de Lapparent de Broin in 2002, who placed it, Elosuchus cherifiensis and Stolokrosuchus in the family Elosuchidae. However, this family was considered to have been established prematurely by subsequent authors and the specific placement of E. felixi would change repeatedly in the following decades. While regarded as a pholidosaurid by some authors, a redescription published in 2016 that coined the name Fortignathus argued that the animal was an early-branching relative of the family Dyrosauridae, a group that nonetheless was closely related to pholidosaurids and Elosuchus. However some even more recent works have called this into question as well, instead arguing that Fortignathus, like Stolokrosuchus, was part of a distinct semi-aquatic radiation of notosuchians known as Itasuchidae. Fortignathus inhabited Niger during the late Early to early Late Cretaceous, though this too is a matter of debate. Traditionally the sediments it came from have been attributed to the Echkar Formation, but recent work by Paul Sereno and colleagues has suggested that the site might actually be better attributed to the overlying Farak Formation. The genus Fortignathus is monotypic, meaning it only contains a single species, Fortignathus felixi.

== History and naming ==
The fossils of Fortignathus were first discovered in the early 1950s during an expedition to the west of In Abangharit region of Niger led by French paleontologist Albert Felix de Lapparent. From there Lapparent and his team recovered over 300 fossil specimens, mostly dinosaurs and crocodyliforms, which stem from sediments now interpreted as the Echkar or Farak Formation. The collected fossils were subsequently deposited within the collection of the Museum national d’Histoire naturelle in Paris. In 1965 France de Lapparent de Broin, the niece of Albert Felix de Lapparent, first described and figured the material that would later become known as Fortignathus under the name "Eleiosuchus africanus" in a PhD thesis, however the thesis was never published, therefore making the name a nomen nudum. De Lapparent de Broin eventually returned to the material in 2002, this time publishing her research. In this study she coined the genus Elosuchus, with Elosuchus cherifiensis (formerly Thoracosaurus cherifiensis) serving as the type species and the material from Abangharit being described as the new species Elosuchus felixi, both of which were placed in the family Elosuchidae alongside Stolokrosuchus.

While Elosuchus cherifiensis was known from some well preserved material, E. felixi was significantly more fragmentary. The holotype, specimen MNHN.F INA 25, is represented by a deformed and incomplete lower jaw of what may have been a juvenile consisting of the dentary and the splenial, neither of which were preserved in full. Despite the already limited nature of the material, de Lapparent de Broin did not provide a full description of the specimen, instead only giving a brief diagnosis. In a move considered even more problematic by subsequent researchers, de Lapparent de Broin also referred some 50 specimens to the newly named species, most of which did not overlap with what was known for E. felixi. These specimens went largely unfigured, their inclusion was not justified by the study and as stated by de Lapparent de Broin herself may have actually represented two different taxa.

In their 2016 publication on Elosuchus Meunier and Larsson also comment on the state of E. felixi, voicing their doubts on whether or not it was a valid species while alluding to upcoming work dealing with the matter. The doubts surrounding Elosuchus felixi eventually lead to a full redescription of the animal published by Mark T. Young and colleagues in 2016. Given that the species was established on the basis of a lower jaw, all the postcranial material initially attributed to the species by de Lapparent de Broin was removed from the hypodigm, leaving the taxon with only three confirmed specimens. These three were the holotype, a fragmentary dentary tip (MNHN.F INA 22) and a more complete lower jaw (MNHN.F INA 21) that is both larger and more complete than the holotype. Through the course of the redescription the team recognized that E. felixi was not just morphologically distinct from Elosuchus cherifiensis, but also unlikely to be closely related, having been recovered as a dyrosaurid by Young and colleagues. For this reason the animal was placed in its own genus, Fortignathus. Some studies took this separation even further, proposing that Fortignathus was not even a neosuchian but instead a notosuchian closely related to the family Peirosauridae or within the family Itasuchidae.

The name Fortignathus is a combination of the Latin word "fortis", meaning "strong" or "powerful", and "gnathus", latinized Greek for "jaw". This choice of name was specifically made in light of not the holotype but the larger and more robust specimen MNHN.F INA 21. The species was named in honor of Albert Felix de Lapparent.

== Description ==
Fortignathus is known from rather limited material, the three specimens attributed to the genus only consisting of incomplete dentary and splenials, though the more complete specimens do preserve the full mandibular symphysis. Overall the tip of the lower jaw has been described as gladius-shaped, reaching its greatest width at the position of the fourth dentary teeth and tapering towards the front. This sets it apart from the generally more spatulate dentary tips seen in pholidosaurids. Following the writings of Jouve and colleagues, the shape of the symphysis is likely related to the elongation of the lower jaw as a whole, which is more pronounced than in peirosaurids with an "intermediate" condition such as Pepesuchus, Hamadasuchus and Kinesuchus. The lower jaw also subtly narrows behind the fourth dentary tooth until eventually reaching its smallest width at the position of the eighth tooth, at which point it grows wider again, surpassing the greatest width of the symphysis by the 13th tooth position. The narrowing of the mandible has also been used to set apart Fortignathus from pholidosaurids, with Young and colleagues noting that in the case of Sarcosuchus and Chalawan thailandicus the narrowing takes place just behind the spatulate dentary tip while taxa like Elosuchus and Terminonaris display little to no narrowing in the pre-splenial region. The splenial contributes to the mandibular symphysis via an elongated triangular process that tapers towards the snout tip before ending at approximately the level of the seventh dentary tooth.

Viewing the lower jaw from the side shows a strongly sinusoidal dorsal surface, known as festooning. More precisely, the lower jaw displays a clear concavity between the first and fourth teeth, then again from the 4th to the 13th alveoli (the largest) and a shallow third that spans the space between the 13th tooth and the beginning of the mandibular fenestra. Young and colleagues also note that the surface of the dentary next to the toothrow within the second concavity is noticeably smooth in the holotype and may have been similarly smooth in the more complete referred mandible. This pattern of concavities does provide some information on the morphology of the upper jaw as well, suggesting a convex premaxilla and a maxilla that featured two festoons. This double festooning helps set apart Fortignathus from many similar forms, as most pholidosaurids lack festooning period while non-hyposaurine dyrosaurids tend to have only one festoon or none at all in the case of Chenanisuchus. Double festooning in the maxilla is however present in some early tomistomines.

Overall the outer surface of the mandible has been described as gently convex and possibly covered by a series of large, closely spaced and subcircular foramina as well as raised ridges, though there is some uncertainty on this due to the damage to the bone's surface.

The dentition of Fortignathus consists of 19 teeth in each half of the lower jaw, 13 of which as part of the mandibular symphysis, six of which positioned before the contribution of the splenial bones. The first dentary tooth is angled anterolaterally, meaning forward and outward, and is of similar size to the fourth and 13th dentary teeth, which make up the largest teeth in the lower jaw. Young and colleagues specifically highlight the size of the first and fourth alveoli relative to the second and third, describing them as noticeably larger, though Jouve and colleagues later described the first four alveoli as being of the same size. Contrary to what has originally been illustrated by de Lapparent de Broin, the fourth dentary tooth was positioned further dorsally than the preceding two teeth. The fourth and 13th have also been noted for having a suboval or subrectangular crosssection with a mesiodistal orientation. Some features of the tooth spacing have been noted to resemble non-hyposaurine dyrosaurids, namely the fact that the first and second teeth as well as the third and fourth teeth are more closely spaced to each other than the second and the third, which may be explained by the presence of an enlarged third premaxillary teeth that separates these pairs. Although recently hypothesized to be a member of the family Itasuchidae, Fortignathus does not display the same pattern of paired dentary alveoli seen in several itasuchid genera where the sixth and seventh as well as the eighth and ninth dentary teeth form couplets separated by a distinct diastema.

== Phylogeny ==
The position of Fortignathus among crocodylomorphs has been subject to some debate. Originally, when it was still known as Elosuchus felixi, it was placed in the family Elosuchidae alongside Elosuchus cherifiensis and Stolokrosuchus. However this grouping did not find widespread use and eventually came to be regarded as premature and poorly defined, with subsequent authors specifically pointing out how many of the clades defining features were questionable or unknown in Stolokrosuchus, which since then has been regarded as either a basal neosuchian or a notosuchian closely allied with peirosaurids.

The first paper to specifically test the phylogenetic relationship between Fortignathus and other crocodylomorphs was the 2016 redescription by Young and colleagues, which agreed that Elosuchidae had been coined prematurely as Fortignathus and Elosuchus were never recovered as sister taxa in their analyses. Their results placed Elosuchus among pholidosaurids such as Sarcosuchus whereas Fortignathus was placed in an early diverging position within Dyrosauridae, specifically in a basal polytomy alongside Chenanisuchus.

- - - Crocodylus niloticus (Nile crocodile)
    - Alligator mississipiensis (American alligator)
  - Goniopholis
  - - †Chalawan
    - †Sarcosuchus imperator
    - †Sarcosuchus hartti
    - †Elosuchus
    - - †Vectisuchus
      - - †Pholidosaurus sp.
        - †Pholidosaurus purbeckensis
        - - †Terminonaris
          - - †Pholidosaurus schaumbergensis
            - †Oceanosuchus
  - - †Chenanisuchus
    - †Fortignathus
    - - - †Sokotosuchus
        - †Phosphatosaurus
      - - †Cerrejonisuchus
        - †Anthracosuchus
        - - †Arambourgisuchus
          - - †Dyrosaurus
            - - †Congosaurus
              - †Hyposaurus
              - †Acherontisuchus
              - †Rhabdognathus
              - - - †Guarinisuchus
                  - †Atlantosuchus

A position within Neosuchia, though not always within Dyrosauridae, was recovered by other researchers as well. Groh and colleagues actually recovered both Elosuchus and Fortignathus as sister taxa within Pholidosauridae while Souza and colleagues recovered Fortignathus at the very base of Neosuchia as the sister taxon to Batrachomimus. Most recently among these was the 2025 description of Wadisuchus by Saber and colleagues, however this particular study used the premaxilla that Young and colleagues attributed to Elosuchus sp. and can not be assigned to Fortignathus.

However, other studies following the redescription have come to call the idea of Fortignathus as a neosuchian into question. Jouve and colleagues voiced their doubts on the matter in a 2021 paper, explaining the absence of Fortignathus in their phylogeny as having been a choice made due to their suspicion that the animal was actually a peirosaurid notosuchian, not a neosuchian. They reason that two phylogenetic characters used by Young and colleagues are actually merely related to the elongation of the lower jaw and that several other anatomical features not further elaborated on also support this interpretation. This, combined with an increase in research on various platyrostral peirosaurids, culminated in the hypothesis that Fortignathus was part of the family Itasuchidae, which in addition to semi-aquatic forms from South America like Pepesuchus also includes Stolokrosuchus, a genus originally proposed to be closely related to Fortignathus and Elosuchus by de Lapparent de Broin. However the position of Fortignathus within Itasuchidae is unclear, as Wilberg and colleagues recovered multiple alternative placements, both in a more basal position (although generally more derived than Kinesuchus) or among the most derived genera in a polytomy with Itasuchus, Caririsuchus, Roxochampsa and Amargasuchus.

- - †Doratodon
  - - †Mahajangasuchidae
    - - †Sebecidae
      - - †Peirosauridae
        - †Itasuchidae
          - †Kinesuchus
          - - †Fortignathus
            - - †Stolokrosuchus
              - - †Fortignathus
                - - †Rukwasuchus
                  - - †Fortignathus
                    - - †Epoidesuchus
                      - - - †Sissokosuchus
                          - †Barreirosuchus
                        - - †Pepesuchus
                          - - †Caririsuchus
                            - †Itasuchus
                            - †Fortignathus
                            - †Amargasuchus
                            - †Roxochampsa

== Paleobiology ==
Traditionally the sediments in Niger that yielded the remains of Fortignathus have been attributed to the upper parts of the Tegama Group, with authors generally identifying the rock layers as the late Albian to early Cenomanian Echkar Formation. However, this interpretation has been challenged by Sereno and colleagues in a 2026 study that argues that the true Echkar Formation is actually barren and that the fossiliferous layers, such as those of Iguidi west of In Abangharit, are actually part of the early to middle Cenomanian (100 to 95 Ma) Farak Formation.

Regardless of what stratigraphic unit the sediments belonged to, they are known for their diverse fauna of both dinosaurs and crocodylomorphs. Large herbivores are represented by both diplodocoid and titanosaurian sauropods, with studies making reference to Rebbachisaurus and fossils tentatively referred to Aegyptosaurus. The theropod fauna on the other hand is known to include the small abelisaur Rugops, the large terrestrial carcharodontosaur Carcharodontosaurus and Spinosaurus mirabilis, though this animal's ecology remains a matter of debate. In addition to Fortignathus several other crocodylomorphs have been recovered from the region as well. These include a species of Elosuchus, as evidenced by the premaxillary remains once attributed to Fortignathus, the flat-snouted stomatosuchid Laganosuchus and the mahajangasuchid Kaprosuchus, well known for its multiple pairs of large tusks. Other animals from this part of Niger indicate the presence of the sawskate Onchopristis, bichirs, turtles and azhdarchoid pterosaurs. What specific niche Fortignathus might have filled in this faunal assemblage has not been studied in detail, however Young and colleagues have made the argument that given the abundance of large-bodied predators, among them putatively semi-aquatic forms like Spinosaurus, it may have been religated to the rolle of a semi-aquatic mesopredator. Young and colleagues further suggest that it might have avoided competition with the other local crocodylomorphs through their differing snout morphologies, allowing for niche partitioning.

Serenno and colleagues describe the Farak Formation as having been deposited by a river in a riparian environment and note the preservation of fossil wood including tree trunks. They note the absence of sediments associated with marshy or intertidal conditions and highlight that during the time of deposition the region would have been much more inland than the possibly contemporary Kem Kem Group of Morocco, with the nearest coastline lying 500–1.000 km (310.686–0.621 mi) to the southeast. The lack of marine influence is also felt in the fish fauna, with the otherwise widespread Onchopristis being notably rarer than in other more brackish or even marginally marine sediments and hybodonts or other elasmobranchs not having been recovered at all. Wilberg and colleagues have also discussed the environment of early Cretaceous Niger in their description of the itasuchid Sissokosuchus from the Continental Intercalaire of Mali. While their work focused on older sediments thought to be contemporary with the Elrhaz Formation, they nonetheless use the fauna of the Echkar Formation to illustrate the vast size of what they dub the Paleo-Tegama River, which seems to have drained northwest into the Tethys sea.
