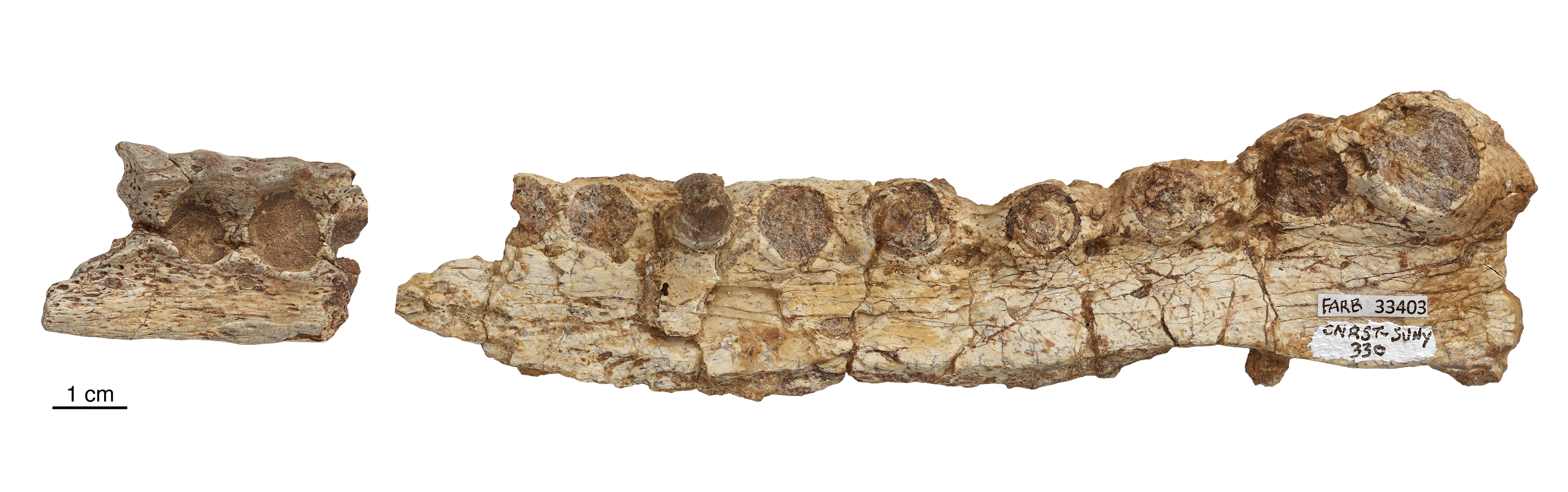
- Referred maxilla in palatal view

Scientific classification
- Kingdom: Animalia
- Phylum: Chordata
- Class: Reptilia
- Clade: Pseudosuchia
- Clade: Crocodylomorpha
- Clade: †Notosuchia
- Family: †Itasuchidae
- Genus: †Sissokosuchus; Wilberg et al., 2025
- Species: †S. maliensis

Binomial name
- †Sissokosuchus maliensis Wilberg et al., 2025

= Sissokosuchus =

Sissokosuchus Temporal range: Early Cretaceous Aptian–Albian

Genus of reptile

Sissokosuchus is an extinct genus of itasuchid notosuchian from the Early Cretaceous Continental intercalaire of Mali. Like other itasuchids, Sissokosuchus had relatively narrow jaws with numerous partially interlocking teeth, somewhat resembling modern crocodilians moreso than the oreinorostrine peirosaurids it's most closely related to. It has therefore been speculated that it may have been semi-aquatic, an idea that matches the fact that the Continental intercalaire has been interpreted as a downstream part of what is dubbed the Paleo-Tegama river system, which also included the fluvial systems of what is now Niger. Sissokosuchus is among the few itasuchids known from Africa and the first deeply nested members from the continent, though the exact implications of this remain somewhat poorly understood. The genus is monotypic, meaning it only includes a single species: S. maliensis.

== History and naming ==
The fossil remains of Sissokosuchus were discovered in 1999 in the poorly defined sediments of the "Continental intercalaire" of Mali, an informal name for a series of rock layers spanning the Carboniferous to Cenomanian. The specific layers where the fossils originates from have been correlated to other western African sediments that suggest a rough Aptian to Albian age. The holotype is one of several specimens found spread across a 10 square meter area and the most complete, consisting of a partial dentary tip, parts of the maxilla and several cranial elements that are almost articulated with each other. Some postcranial material, such as vertebrae, osteoderms and limb bones are also part of the holotype.

The name Sissokosuchus is an eponym, combining the last name of Dr. Famory Sissoko with the Greek word "souchos" (meaning crocodile after the Egyptian deity Sobek). The species name on the other hand is a reference to the Republic of Mali.

== Description ==
The maxilla and its toothrow flare outward following the third maxillary tooth, suggesting that Sissokosuchus had an overall broadly triangular head-shape. Towards the back the maxilla comes into contact with the jugal along a crescent-shaped suture, with the maxilla bearing several prominent neurovascular foramina just before the contact. Closer towards the midline of the skull the maxilla forms a so-called posterodorsal process, an extension of the bone that inserts itself in-between the jugal and the lacrimal bone. Notably, this process preserves part of a shallow depression that could be interpreted as part of the antorbital fossa. However, the region is poorly preserved and the presence of such an opening is inconsistent among members of Itasuchidae, being present in some taxa and absent in others. Therefore whether or not Sissokosuchus had an antorbital fenestra is not confirmed. Even closer to the midline the maxilla forms another tapering process, this time inserting itself into the space between the lacrimal and the nasal bones and even coming into contact with the prefrontal bone. Like in Barreirosuchus, this effectively prevents the lacrimal and nasal from coming into contact with one-another.

Like so much of the skull, only few parts of the nasals are preserved, among them what might be the contact with the maxilla, which appears to have been following a straight suture. More concretely understood is the contact between the nasal and the prefrontal. The prefrontal forms a prominent anterior process that essentially splits the nasal into a posterolateral and a posteromedial process. As the name suggests, the posterolateral process is oriented towards the outside of the skull, forming a narrow tapering point that extends around the outer edge of the prefrontal and is just barely prevented from contacting the lacrimal by the posterodorsal maxillary process. The posteromedial process on the other hand is broader, directed inward and though it likely would have contacted the frontal bone, damage to this part of the skull means its true extent is unclear.

The eyesockets were circular and formed by the combined lacrimal, prefrontal, frontal, postorbital and jugal bones all contributing to its margins. Though no palpebral bones were discovered, they were clearly present as evidenced by the fact that the bones surrounding the eyesocket still preserve points of articulation for them. The anterior articular facet is a semicircular depression spanning the prefrontal and the lacrimal while the posterior facet is located on the postorbital. The space between the eyesockets is composed of both the rectangular prefrontals and the singular frontal bone, divided into a narrower anterior section and a wider posterior region that forms part of the skull table and connects with the postorbitals. The contact between frontal and prefrontal is visible as a square suture that emerges from the edge of the orbit and runs transversely to the skull before taking a turn, extending forward nearly parallel to the midline to form the anterior frontal process.

The most significant part of the lower orbital margin is composed of the jugal, which can be split into three sections. The anterior process extends anterior to the maxilla and bears a trapezoid depression just below its contact with the lacrimal. This depression is split into two halves by a ridge descending from its upper margin and gradually decreasing in prominence until disappearing around halway through the depression. Towards the bottom the jugal bears a line of pits that stretches from the jugal depression, runs below the orbit and eventually ends just beneath the postorbital bar. The second major section of the jugal is the ascending process, an inset peg that rises up and joins the descending process of the postorbital to form the postorbital bar just behind the eyesocket. Like in Barreirosuchus, the postorbital bar is described as robust. Finally, the posterior jugal process is a downwards sloping and narrow element that forms much of the lower edge of the infratemporal fenestra. While already being very narrow, it is also mediolaterally compressed, meaning it is even thinner than it is tall.

The jugal is directly followed by the quadratojugal, which ascends and forms a slender process that formsthe posterior edge of the infratemporal fenestra. Most notably, the quadratojugal of Sissokosuchus contributes heavily to the formation of the craniomandibular joint, making up 20% of the joint surface of the lateral condyle. While the quadratojugal also contributes in this way in some other itasuchids, Araripesuchus and certain sebecids, none of these have as much quadratojugal participation as Sissokosuchus. The remaining 80% of the condylar surface are formed by the quadrate, including the entire medial condyle. Looking at the skull from behind shows that the surface is oval and much wider than high (the height is only about 25% of its width), with the two condyles being separated by a shallow depression.

=== Mandible ===
A feature often accepted to distinguish itasuchids from peirosaurids is the shape of the mandible, which is generally described as broadly U-shaped in the former and much narrower in the latter. The mandibular symphysis appears to have been relatively straight, with the toothrows running almost parallel to each other rather than diverging from each other towards the back. The mandibular symphysis is the fused anterior region of the lower jaw and formed by the dentary and the splenial bones. The former meet along the midline of the lower jaw and remain connected until the position of the sixth dentary tooth, at which point the splenials form a tapering wedge that inserts itself between and separate the dentaries. With the splenials initially also being fused along the midline, the symphysis continues on until the 11th dentary tooth, at which point the two halves of the mandible split from each other to form the mandibular rami. While the lower surface of the dentary is ornamented by a series of deep furrows and pits, Wilberg and colleagues note that the outer surface of the splenial is smooth with the exception of three major features. These are an elongated pit located right down the midline and two step-like depressions located between the midline pit and the end of the symphysis. Looking at the mandibular symphysis from the side shows that its rather uniform in height, only tapering towards the very tip of the snout.

=== Dentition ===
Given that Sissokosuchus is only known from fragmentary remains, the exact number of teeth is unknown. No premaxilla has been recovered and what is preserved of the maxilla suggests a presence of at least 13 teeth (11 alveoli starting with the third). The dentary is equally poorly understood, but appears to have contained 11 teeth on the mandibular symphysis with an unknown number of teeth behind these.

While the anterior alveoli of the maxilla are placed close to the outer edge of the bone, further towards the back the tooth sockets are inset further medially with a lateral lip running along their outer edge. Such inset posterior maxillary teeth are unique within Itasuchidae, nor are they found in peirosaurids or even mahajangasuchids, with the only exception possibly being a single specimen referred to Pepesuchus Overall the toothrow appears to flare outward following the enlarged third maxillary tooth, with the following fourth maxillary tooth slightly more laterally and the remaining teeth all positioned in a more or less straight line.

Both the upper and lower jaw show signs of reception pits, marks that indicate where the teeth of the opposing jaw came into contact with the bone. Within the upper jaw, several reception pits are clearly visible more medially to the maxillary teeth and especially prominent from the fourth to eight maxillary teeth. Here, their position suggests that the maxillary and dentary teeth might have interlocked, though the dentary teeth would have still been positioned somewhat more medially than those of the upper jaw. Meanwhile, a lateral concavity in the lower jaw, located between the seventh and eight dentary teeth, suggests that an enlarged maxillary tooth broke up the toothrow of the lower jaw. Such an enlarged tooth is actually a common feature not just in itasuchids but also in peirosaurids and mahajangasuchids.

While preservation makes observation hard, the orientation of the alveolus suggests that the first tooth in the lower jaw of Sissokosuchus was directed forward, with the second dentary tooth likewise probably having been at least slightly procument. The fourth alveolus is described as being notably larger than the rest, around twice as wide as the surrounding alveoli and slightly elevated above the rest. The presence of reception pits and gaps in the toothrow becomes especially important in the lower jaw, where spacing and tooth size are a key feature that sets itasuchids apart from peirosaurids. For instance, the large fourth dentary alveolus is separated from the fifth by a small but distinct diastema, and yet another is present at the lateral concavity following the seventh dentary alveolus. Whats even more distinct is the arrangement and size of the alveoli in this region. The two alveoli right before the diastema, six and seven, are confluent with each other and the latter is only half the diameter of the former. The reverse is true for alveoli eight and nine, in which the former is smaller and the latter larger, though both are also confluent with each other. This essentially means that the diastema is surrounded by two alveolar couplets, with the alveoli immediately adjacent to the gap being smaller than the outer ones. While the overall pattern of differing spacing and variation in tooth size is common in itasuchids, the particular coupling of alveoli is unique to Sissokosuchus.

While the alveoli give a good overview over the spacing of the teeth, their orientation and the tooth size, only a single actual tooth is known from Sissokosuchus. This tooth, which was part of the maxillary toothrow, is conical in shape with a circular crosssection and a slight constriction at the base of the tooth crown. Fine striations run down the length of the tooth and a small section of a carina (cutting edge) is preserved. The preservation of the carina segment is too poor to show whether or not the teeth of Sissokosuchus were serrated. According to Wilberg and colleagues, most peirosaurids had teeth that are regarded as being truly ziphodont, meaning they bear prominent serrations along the cutting edge. Itasuchids on the other hand tend to either have smooth teeth, as exemplified by Epoidesuchus and Stolokrosuchus, or false ziphodonty, meaning that the cutting edge was merely crenulated due to being intersected by ridges rather than having real serrations.

== Phylogeny ==
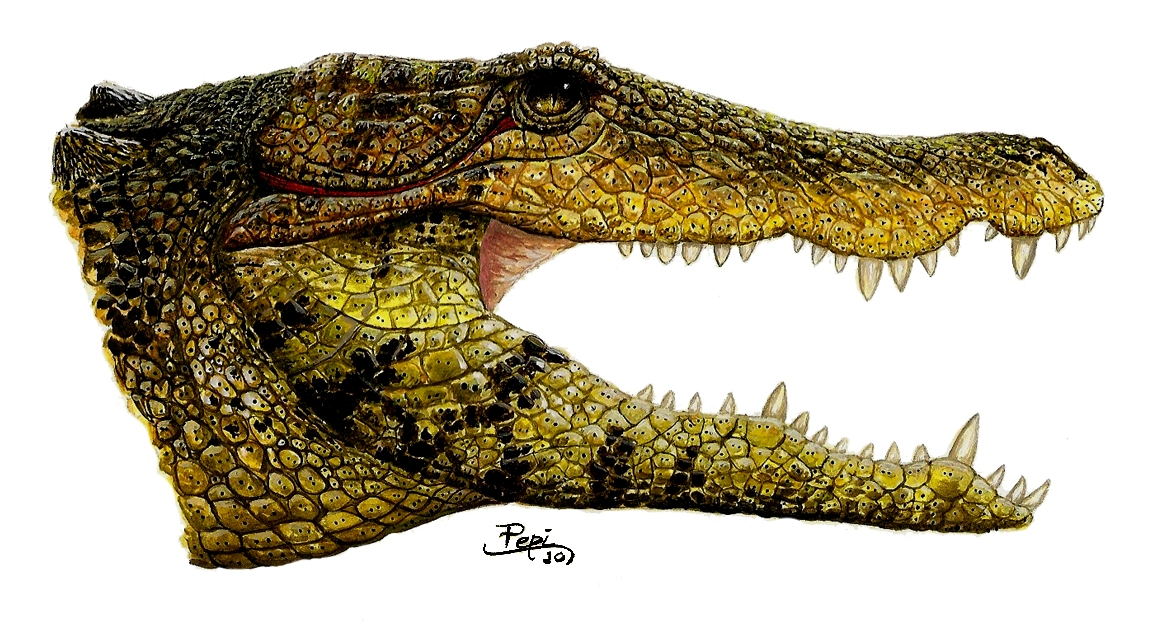
Barreirosuchus franciscoi may have been the closest relatives to Sissokosuchus

Phylogenetic analysis indicates that Sissokosuchus was a member of the Itasuchidae, a group of notosuchians with slender, platyrostral skulls closely related to the oreinirostral members of Peirosauridae. Within Itasuchidae the Argentinian Kinesuchus is the basalmost taxon, followed by the African genera Stolokrosuchus and Rukwasuchus. Despite also coming from Africa, Sissokosuchus is deeply nested within Itasuchidae, having been recovered as the sister taxon to Barreirosuchus from the Late Cretaceous of Brazil.

- - Doratodon
  - - Mahajangasuchidae
    - - Sebecidae
      - - Peirosauridae
        - Itasuchidae
          - Kinesuchus
          - - Stolokrosuchus
            - - Rukwasuchus
              - - Epoidesuchus
                - - - Sissokosuchus
                    - Barreirosuchus
                  - - Pepesuchus
                    - - Caririsuchus
                      - Itasuchus
                      - Amargasuchus
                      - Roxochampsa

== Paleogeography ==
Historically itasuchids have been regarded as an exclusively South American clade, though this idea has since then been challenged by the repeated recovery of Stolokrosuchus as an early branching member of the clade and the inclusion of Rukwasuchus by Ruiz et al. (2024), likewise in a basal position. Wilberg and colleagues reason that the reason for the lack of African itasuchids is twofold, being partially rooted in the fact that itasuchids are rarely featured in phylogenetic analysis and a genuine absence of fossil material of the group from outside of South America. With most basalmost itasuchids (sans Kinesuchus) and the basalmost member of Peirosauridae all being African, Wilberg and colleagues hypothesize that these groups might have originated in Africa and only dispersed into South America later during their evolution. They also note that the breakup of Africa and South America began in the south, with a land bridge remaining in West Africa not far from Mali until the Albian, meaning that the Paleo-Tegama River System inhabited by Sissokosuchus could have been one of the last faunal corridors between the two continents, with its outlet into the Tethys possibly allowing for the dispersal of semi-aquatic animals like itasuchids possibly even after the break up concluded. The team finds support for this idea in the fact that South America and North Africa have some prominent fauna, including not only itasuchids but also members of the genus Araripesuchus (which ranged as far east as Madagascar), members of Candidodontidae and even the genus Sarcosuchus, which is known from both the African species S. imperator and the Brazilian species S. hartti. However, Wilberg and colleagues also highlight that further research into the matter is required, including more stable topologies and more modern methodology.

== Paleobiology ==
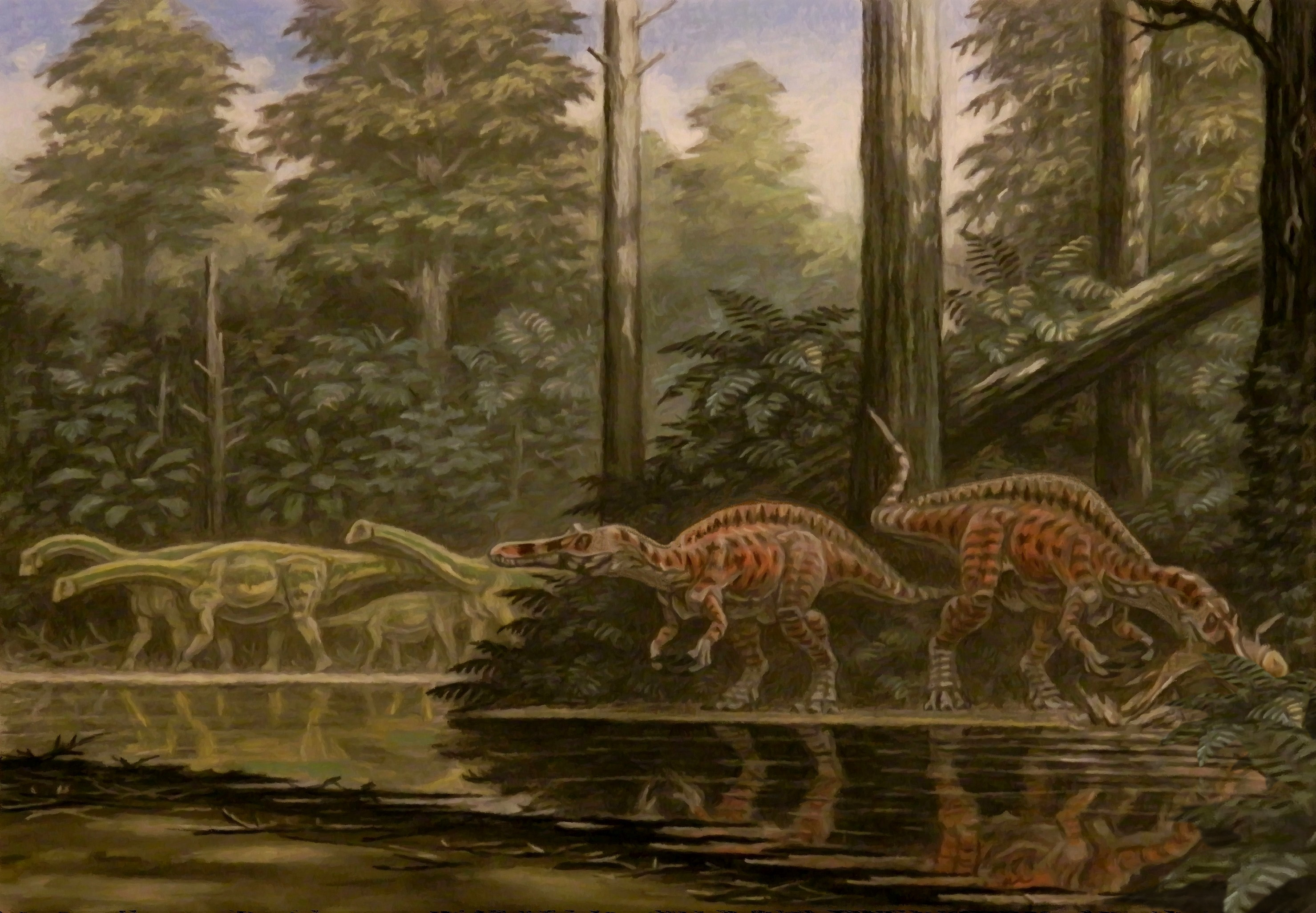
The Continental intercalaire may have been part of the same river system as Niger's Elrhaz Formation.

=== Paleoenvironment ===
Sissokosuchus is known from the locality of Mali 12 of the Continental intercalaire, which are correlated to the Aptian or Albian stages of the Early Cretaceous. The same locality has also yielded the fossil remains of titanosaurs, fish and turtles. The sediments of Mali 12 and paleocurrent measurements suggest that during the Cretaceous this part of Africa was part of a floodplain featuring breaded river systems that may have been subject to seasonal changes in river flow and possible flooding events, explaining the condition the fossil material was found in. Wilberg and colleagues note that the paleocurrent of the contemporary Tegama Group (which includes the Echkar and Elrhaz Formations of Niger) suggest rivers that flowed westward into Mali, with other Cretaceous river systems seemingly also following a broadly northwestern course. Wilberg and colleagues conclude that Mali 12 and the Tegama Group represent both the downstream and upstream parts of the same river system, referred to as the Paleo-Tegama River System by the team. Overall this river system may have been fed by tributaries coming from the southwest and southeast as evidenced by other Cretaceous fluvial sediments, which ultimately came together to form a trunk river system emptying north into the Tethys Sea, which had begun to form an embayment that would later form the Trans-Saharan seaway.

This river system appears to have been quite productive, having supported a wide array of semi-aquatic animals, including the large crocodyliforms Sarcosuchus, Stolokrosuchus and Fortignathus as well as the enigmatic theropod Spinosaurus, all known from the upriver Tegama Group. The Paleo-Tegama River System could have furthermore functioned as a faunal corridor throughout West Africa, seeing as semi-aquatic crocodyliforms and spinosaurids are also known from contemporary sediments of Cameroon.

=== Paleoecology ===
Itasuchids are generally distinguished from their more deep-skulled relatives of the Peirosauridae by having narrow, elongated and flattened (platyrostral) snouts, something which has been argued to be evidence for itasuchids having been more semiaquatic than most notosuchians other than the closely related members of the Mahajangasuchidae. The reasoning behind this is that platyrostral snouts, as also seen in modern crocodilians, reduce drag when the animal sweeps its head side to side when underwater, which would be beneficial when capturing prey items. However, this hypothesis is largely based on skull shape alone, with itasuchid postcrania being very poorly understood and requiring additional research.
