= Ibirasuchus =

Ibirasuchus Temporal range: Late Cretaceous, Santonian

Scientific classification
- Kingdom: Animalia
- Phylum: Chordata
- Class: Reptilia
- Clade: Archosauria
- Clade: Pseudosuchia
- Clade: Crocodylomorpha
- Clade: †Notosuchia
- Family: †Itasuchidae
- Genus: †Ibirasuchus; Iori et al., 2025
- Species: †I. gelcae

Binomial name
- †Ibirasuchus gelcae Iori et al., 2025

Extinct crocodylomorph genus

Ibirasuchus is an extinct genus of itasuchid notosuchian from the Late Cretaceous São José do Rio Preto Formation of Brazil's Bauru Group. The genus contains a single species, Ibirasuchus gelcae, known from a few bones representing the animal's skull table.

== History and naming ==
The holotype of Ibirasuchus was discovered in 2008 by biologist Angélica Fernandes dos Santos at the Zero Um Paleontological Site of the Santonian São José do Rio Preto Formation, a unit of the famous Bauru Group of Brazil. It was subsequently described in 2025 as part of a larger review of the crocodyliform fauna of the São José do Rio Preto Formation by Fabiani Vidoi Iori and colleagues.

The name Ibirasuchus derives from the municipality of Ibira of São Paulo State, where most important fossil sites of the São José do Rio Preto Formation are located, and the Greek word "suchus" for crocodile. The species name honors the discoverer of the holotype, Angélica Fernandes dos Santos, nicknamed "Gelca".

== Description ==
Ibirasuchus is only known from a few bones of the skull table, specifically the squamosal, parietal and supraoccipital, though only a small portion of the squamosal is preserved.

=== Size ===
Ibirasuchus is described as a medium to large-sized itasuchid specifically likened to Epoidesuchus and Barreirosuchus based on the length of the parietal bone. Assuming that the length of the parietal makes up about 16% of the total skull length as in the well-preserved longirostrine peirosaur Hamadasuchus from Morocco, Ibirasuchus could have measured up to 4 m (13 ft) in length. The maximum size could be even greater when using other proxies such as Stolokrosuchus, which has the longest snout among peirosaurs and whose parietal only constitutes 8% of the total skull length.

== Paleobiology ==
Fossils of Ibirasuchus are known from the Late Cretaceous São José do Rio Preto Formation of Brazil. The sediments of this formation previously yielded the fossil remains of turtles, fish, dinosaurs (including Antarctosaurus, Thanos and Ibirania) and a wide range of crocodyliforms, specifically notosuchians. This includes members of Baurusuchidae and Sphagesauridae, both of which are rare within these strata, peirosaurids and itasuchids, of which the formation preserves at least two. The second itasuchid from the formation—in addition to Ibirasuchus—is Epoidesuchus.

The abundance of itasuchids in the São José do Rio Preto Formation may relate to the fact that these strata represent a fluvial or fluvial-lacustrine environment, as itasuchids are generally interpreted as having been semi-aquatic animals.
