= Collection of fossils in the National Museum of Brazil =

Fossil Collection

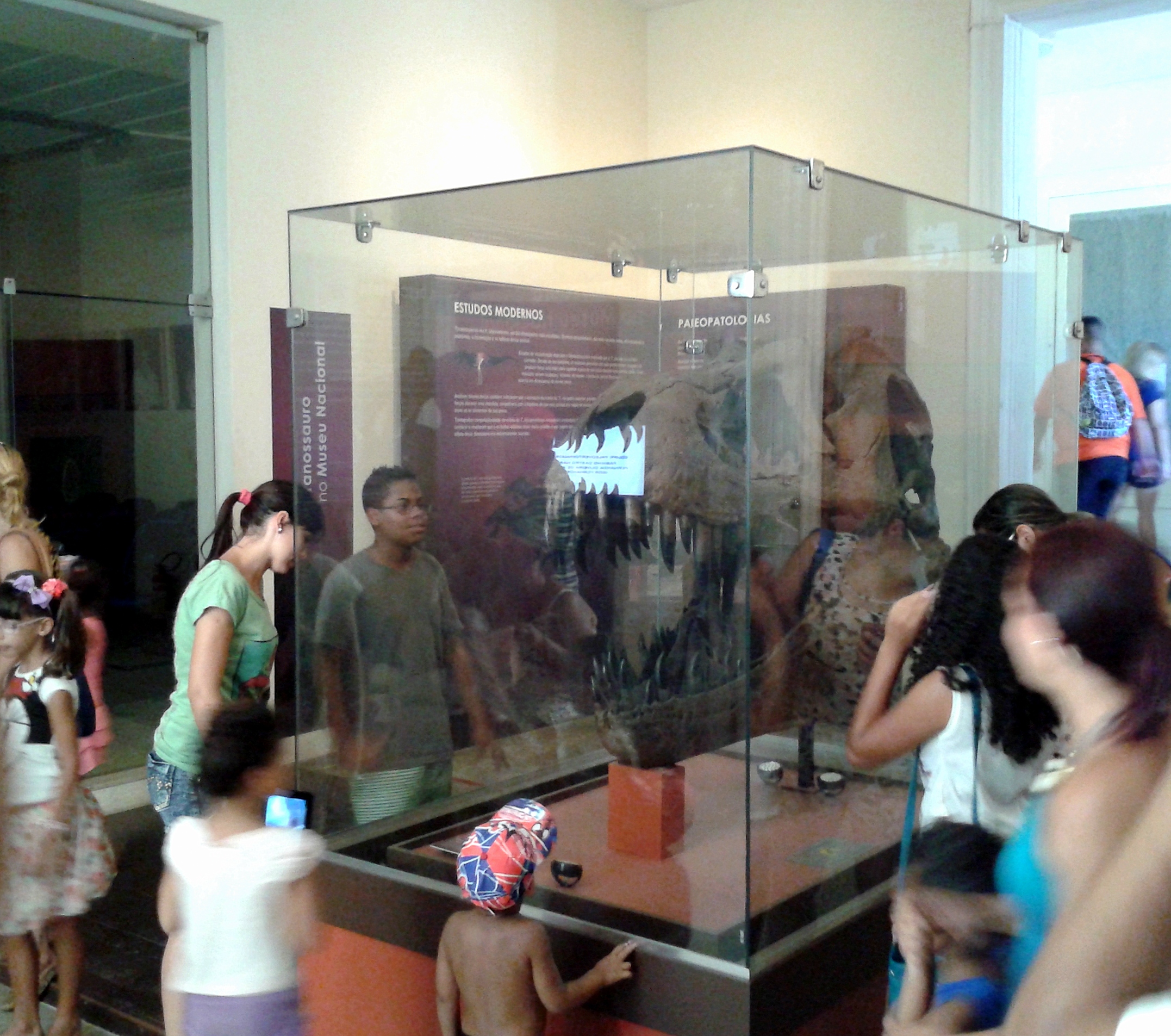
Exhibition of a Tyrannosaurus rex skull in the museum

The National Museum of Brazil collections included an exhibition of fossils.

The current status of the collection is unknown after the fire that destroyed the museum in September 2018.

Image	Name	Age	Period	Origin	Notes
	Angaturama limai skeleton, indeterminate pterosaur skeleton and a spinosaur sacrum (possibly belonging to Angaturama or Irritator)	110 Ma	Early Cretaceous	Santana Formation	
	Lambeosaurus skull	75 Ma	Late Cretaceous	Dinosaur Park Formation	
	Tyrannosaurus rex skull	65 Ma	Late Cretaceous		
	Luzia Woman	11 ka		Found in Lapa Vermelha IV, Lagoa Santa, Minas Gerais, Brazil	
	Dinodontosaurus skeleton	290-225 Ma	Permian-Triassic	Santa Maria Formation	
	Santanaraptor skeleton	110 Ma	Early Cretaceous	Santana Formation	
	Saber-toothed cat skeleton	1.8 Ma	Pleistocene		
	Odonata fossil	105 Ma	Early Cretaceous	Crato Formation	
	Maxakalisaurus topai skeleton (replica)	80 Ma	Late Cretaceous	Adamantina Formation	
	Pterosaur wing				
	Eremotherium skeleton	1.8 Ma			
	Ruffordia goepperti				
	Tupandactylus skeleton	115 Ma	Early Cretaceous	Crato Formation	
	Tropeognathus mesembrinus skeleton	110 Ma	Early Cretaceous	Santana Formation	
	Dastilbe crandalli	105-110 Ma	Early Cretaceous	Crato & Santana Formations	
	Psaronius brasiliensis	270 Ma	Permian	Piauí	
	Spiders	105 Ma	Early Cretaceous	Crato Formation	
	Annularia, Asplenites, Bornia, Calamites, Cyclopteris, Equisetites, Glockeria, Hymenophylites, Lepidodendron, Lepidophyllum, Neuropteris, Odontopteris, Pecopteris, Sphenopteris, Sigillaria, Stigmaria, Volkmannia, Woodwardites		Carboniferous	Europe	
	Protoischnurus axelrodorum	105 Ma	Early Cretaceous	Crato Formation	
	Araripemys barretoi	110 Ma	Early Cretaceous	Santana Formation	
	Bauruemys elegans	80 Ma	Late Cretaceous	Presidente Prudente Formation	
	Beurlenia araripensis	105 Ma	Early Cretaceous	Crato Formation	
	Araripichthys castilhoi	105-110 Ma	Early Cretaceous	Crato & Santana Formations	
	Stereosternum	275 Ma	Permian	Irati Formation	
	Lizard	105 Ma	Early Cretaceous	Crato Formation	

== See also ==
- National Museum of Brazil
