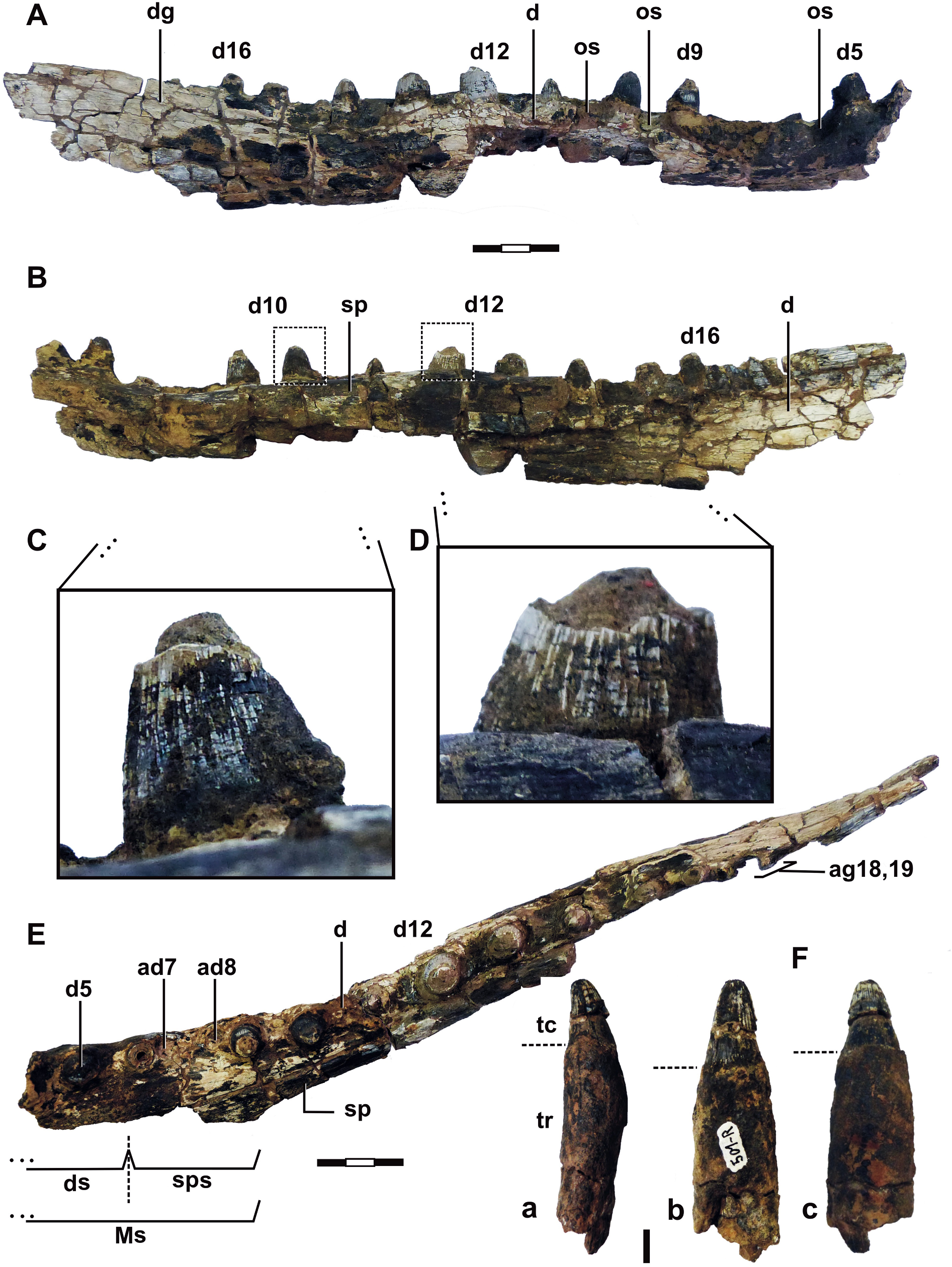
- Referred mandibular remains of Roxochampsa

Scientific classification
- Kingdom: Animalia
- Phylum: Chordata
- Class: Reptilia
- Clade: Pseudosuchia
- Clade: Crocodylomorpha
- Clade: †Notosuchia
- Family: †Itasuchidae
- Genus: †Roxochampsa; Piacentini Pinheiro et al., 2018
- Species: †R. paulistanus

Binomial name
- †Roxochampsa paulistanus Roxo, 1936

Synonyms
- Goniopholis paulistanus Roxo, 1936

= Roxochampsa =

Roxochampsa Temporal range: Late Cretaceous ~Campanian–Maastrichtian

Extinct genus of reptiles

Roxochampsa is an extinct genus of itasuchid notosuchian from the Late Cretaceous of Brazil. Fossil remains have been found in the sediments of the Adamantina and Presidente Prudente Formations and were originally described as a species of Goniopholis. Roxochampsa had narrow and elongated jaws that indicate a mesorostrine and flattened skull shape. The teeth were interlocking as in modern crocodiles and bear carinae with crenulations, making it pseudo-ziphodont. Among the most distinguishing features of Roxochampsa is the fact that the teeth furthermore bear prominent crenulated ridges that form secondary cutting edges in addition to the main carinae. It is interpreted as a semi-aquatic generalist predator, feeding both on small terrestrial vertebrates, fish, carrion and hard-shelled prey it was able to crack with its blunter posterior teeth. The genus is monotypic, the type species is R. paulistanus.

== History and naming ==
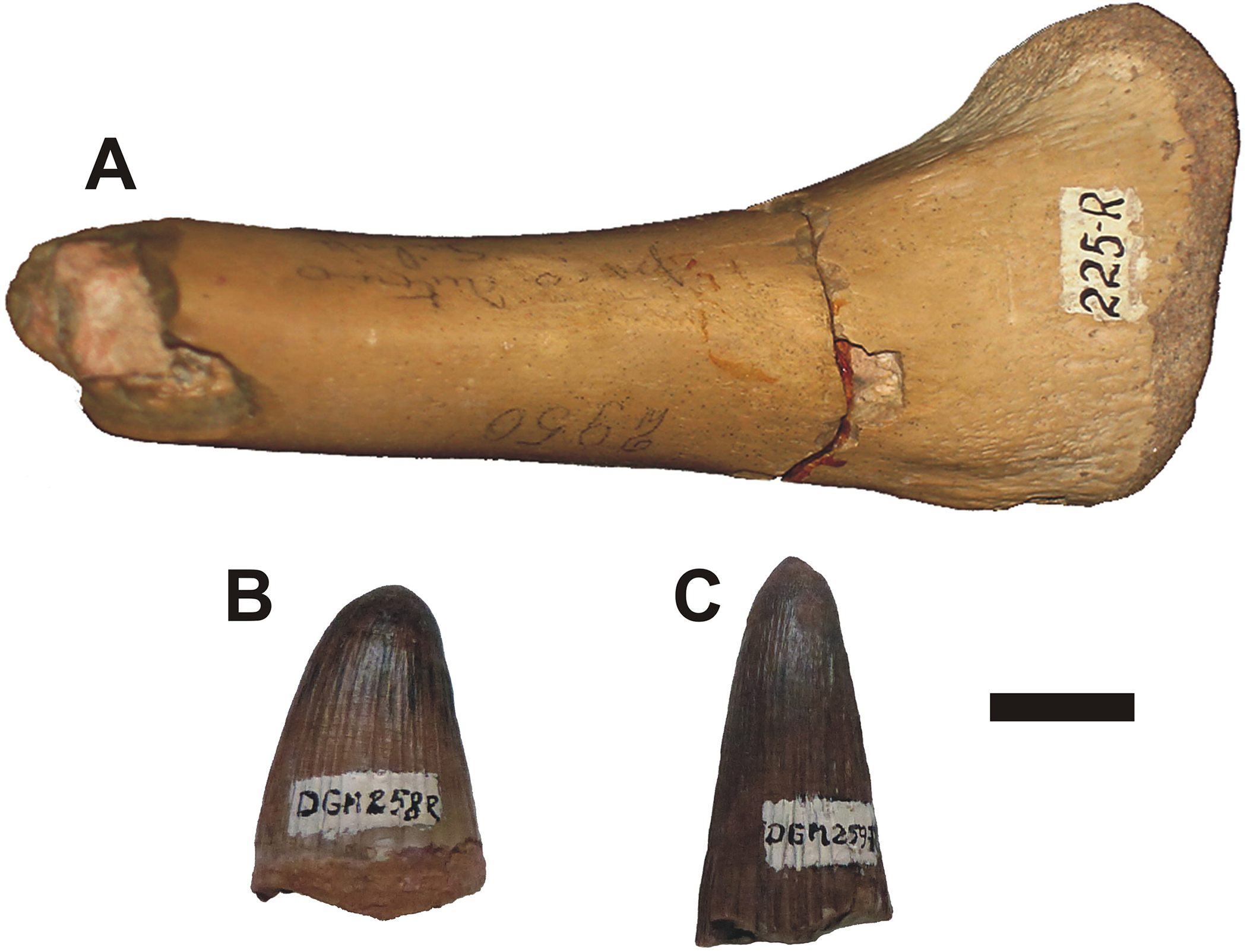
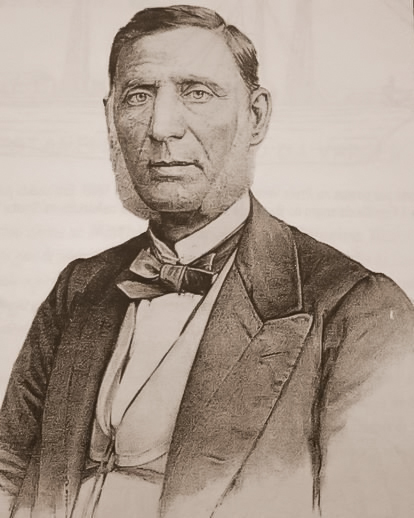
The original material (left) described by Roxo (right), including the lectotype teeth and an assigned tibia.

=== Early discoveries ===
Teeth similar to those of Roxochampsa have been recognized from Brazil's Bauru Group as early as 1911, when Hermann von Ihering analyzed two isolated teeth recovered a few years prior from a well in São José do Rio Preto municipality. Von Ihering compared the teeth to those of the thalattosuchian Machimosaurus and the neosuchian Goniopholis, but due to his own uncertainty simply assigned them to the family Goniopholididae rather than any particular genus. Concurrently with von Iherings description of the isolated teeth in 1911, a second collection of fossils from the region was assembled, including additional isolated teeth. These were described in 1913 by Joviano A. Pacheco, who like van Ihering recognized similarities to the European genus Goniopholis, but unlike the former actually assigned the material to it. Both von Iherings and Pacheco's fossils were then later studied by Friedrich von Huene in 1931. In the case of the van Ihering teeth, von Huene likewise drew comparison to Machimosaurus, specifically referring one of the teeth to the species Machimosaurus hugii. Von Huene was less certain on Pacheco's identification, instead simply regarding the teeth as having come from a long-snouted mesoeucrocodylian rather than Goniopholis specifically. In 1950 Llewellyn Ivor Price called the interpretation of the supposed Machimosaurus tooth into question, arguing that the morphological difference to the other tooth described by von Ihering could be due to tooth wear. Price also cast doubt over the "Goniopholis hypothesis", though the relevant fossil has now been lost.

=== Description of Goniopholis paulistanus ===
Even more fragmentary remains were discovered through the early 1900s, including two teeth (DGM 259-R and DGM 258-R) recovered in 1935 near Amandaba city in Mirandópolis, which corresponds to the Cretaceous Adamantina Formation, a partial tibia (DGM 225-R) found in a well in Valparaíso and a now missing tail vertebra. This material was described under the name Goniopholis paulistanus in 1936 by Mathias Gonçalves de Oliveria Roxo, who regarded this new species as a close relative to "Goniopholis" affinis. While the two teeth found in 1935 served as the syntype material, Roxo also assigned the fragmentary postcrania as well as the teeth previously described by von Ihering and Pacheco to this new species.

As a consequence, various teeth of similar morphology and even some other cranial remains from the Bauru Group came to be assigned to the family Goniopholididae in the subsequent years. However, even with a formal species of Goniopholis established from South America, some authors remained suspicious of the groups presence on the continent. After Eric Buffetaut established the family Trematochampsidae in 1974, several teeth of similar morphology to those of Goniopholis paulistanus were instead referred to this family and even several more complete longirostrine taxa such as Itasuchus and Pepesuchus. However, Trematochampsidae was eventually regarded as an unnatural grouping, being centered around a chimeric taxon and including multiple ultimately unrelated forms.

=== Revisions and reassessment ===
2011 saw a revision of the genus Goniopholis published by Andrade and colleagues. In this study, the team warned that though useful in recognizing broader morphotypes, tooth crowns alone are not sufficient in recognizing specific clades or even species and would require either the support of a phylogenetic framework of more substantial fossil remains. Accordingly Goniopholis paulistanus, which was named on the basis of isolated teeth, was regarded as a nomen dubium due to the absence of diagnostic features and overall scarcity of fossil material.

Pinheiro et al. (2018) described new jaw material from the Presidente Prudente Formation of the Alfredo Marcondes municipality in São Paulo state, and noted that the tooth crowns in the jaw material morphologically matched the teeth in the syntype series of G. paulistanus. They coined the new genus name Roxochampsa for the species, designating DGM 259-R and DGM 258-R as the lectotype and paralectotype respectively, while regarding the tibia (collected at a different locality than the teeth) as having belonged to an indeterminate taxon. Five years after this redescription Pinheiro and colleagues published another study describing various additional itasuchid fossils, among them a mandibular symphysis from the same site as the 2018 material tentatively assigned to Roxochampsa paulistanus.

=== Etymology ===
The name Roxochampsa combines the Greek suffix Xαμψαι (champsa), which translates to "crocodile" and the last name of Mathias Gonçalves de Oliveria Roxo, who originally described the species as Goniopholis paulistanus in 1936.

== Description ==
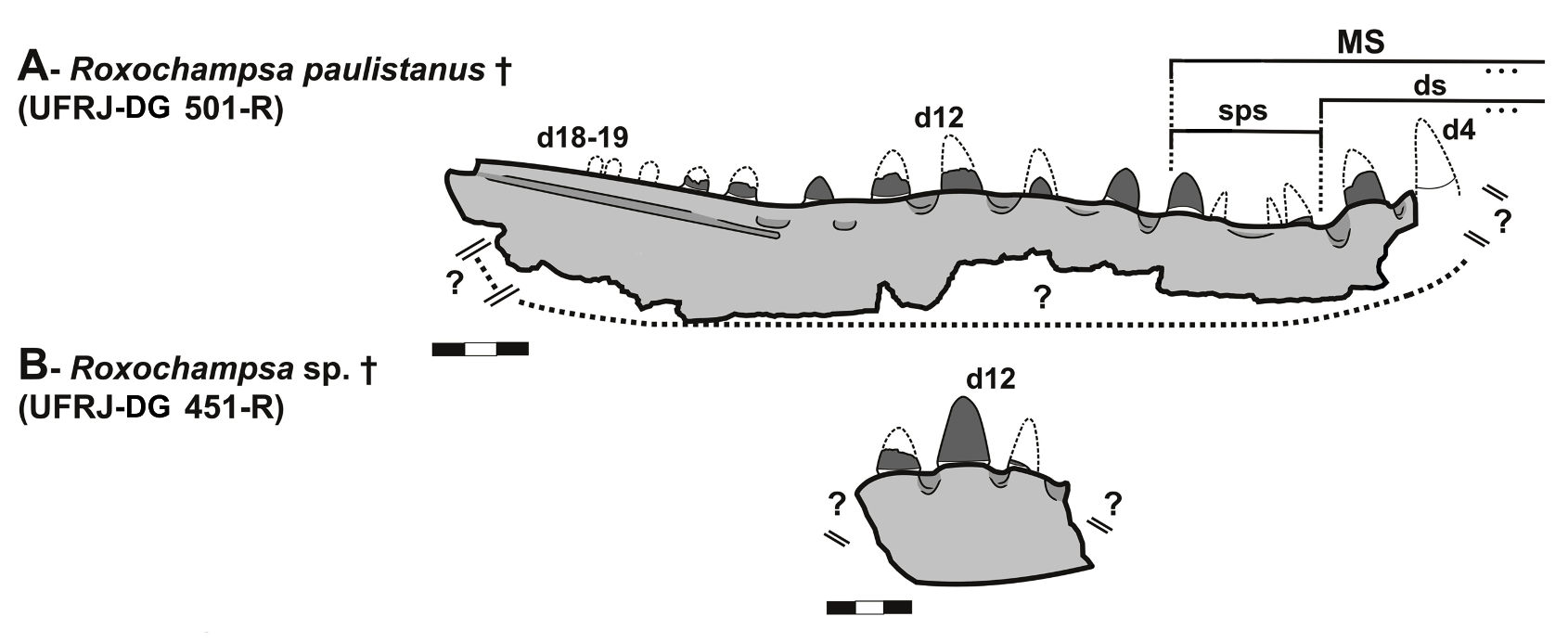
Reconstruction of lower jaw material of Roxochampsa.

In the 2018 description of Roxochampsa, Pinheiro and colleagues interpret it as having been platyrostral and mesorostrine, which translates to a skull of moderate or "normal" length with an overall flattened morphology likened to other itasuchids and modern crocodiles. In their 2023 morphospace analysis Pinheiro and colleagues find itasuchids to occupy an intermediate between brevirostrine (broad-snouted) and longirostrine (long-snouted) taxa.

The snout of Roxochampsa is interpreted as having been mesorostrine and platyrostral, meaning it was of moderate or "normal" length and flattened much like those of modern crocodiles. This morphology can also be found in related notosuchians like Itasuchus, Pepesuchus and Barreirosuchus. In lateral view the lower jaw shows two distinct waves that festoon the mandible, one that peaks around the level of the fourth and fifth dentary teeth and a second, shallower peak between the eight and fourteenth teeth. Conversely, the occlusal margin of the mandible performs downard slopes that reach their lowest points around the region between the fifth and ninth dentary teeth and further back between the 13th and 15th teeth. Behind these the mandible grows slightly in height, though the increase is less prominent than even Pepesuchus and Itasuchus.

The symphyseal region, where the two halves of the lower jaw are conjoined, is formed by both the dentaries and splenials and about as broad as it is tall. The symphysis is moderately long as in Itasuchus and Pepesuchus and is thought to extend across nine teeth, with the dentary symphysis containing the first five and the subsequent four being positioned alongside the splenial's contribution to the element. The surface of the symphysis was relatively flat to slightly convex and situated higher than the toothrow. Behind the symphysis with its straight lateral margin the mandible expands outward at a 25° angle with a convex outline, giving the entire mandible the shape of a narrow Y. Towards the back of the dentary the outer surface bears a sulcus that ends in a nutrient foramen and would have presumably extended onto the surangular, though the bone is missing in the known fossil of Roxochampsa.

While most of the mandibles surface is obscured it seems to follow the general pattern seen in other mesoeucrocodylians that sees a pitted ornamentation in the front and a sulci pattern towards the rear of the lower jaw.

=== Dentition ===
Based on the referred mandibular remains Roxochampsa is thought to have had 19 teeth in each hemimandible with most of them nestled in distinct alveoli formed by the dentary bone, though from the space between the 13th and 14th tooth onward the splenial forms the medial wall of the alveoli and the last two teeth are situated in an alveolar groove. This tooth count is slightly higher than what has been described for Pepesuchus and Itasuchus but lower than the reported tooth count of Caririsuchus. The first teeth in the jaw are procumbent, meaning they were pointing more forward and oriented sub-horizontal relative to the mandibular symphysis. Pinheiro and colleagues describe the distance between the individual teeth as ranging from "normal to well interspaced" throughout most the jaw. Exceptions to this are seen in two parts of the jaw, the first being the third and fourth teeth which are contiguous with each other. The spacing is also much closer just behind the symphysis from the sixth to ninth dentary teeth. Both the seventh and eight are very small and essentially contiguous with the sixth and ninth respectively, forming a pair of couplets similar to what is seen in Itasuchus and Pepesuchus. The closely spaced couplets are in turned separated from another by a short diastema.

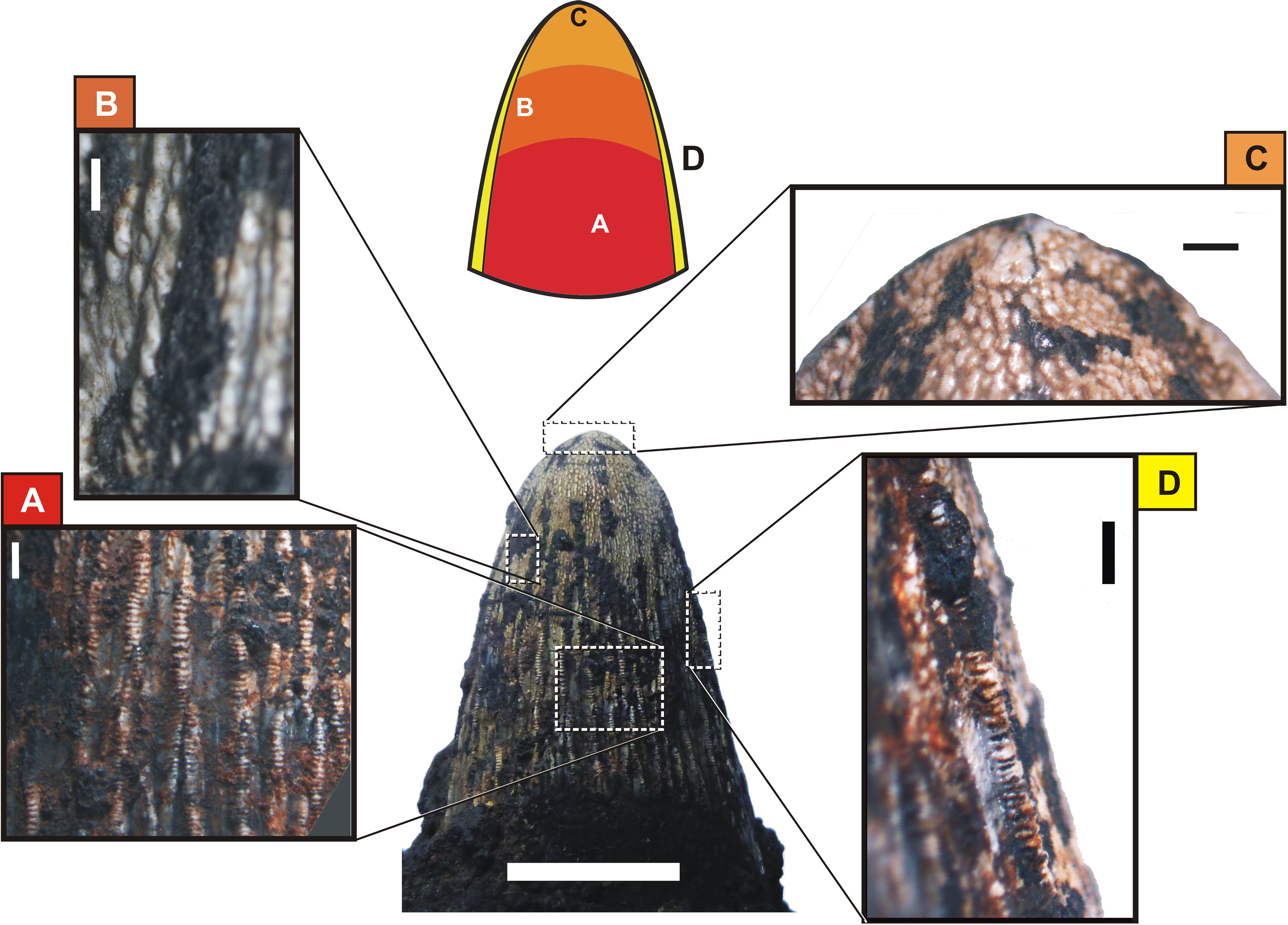
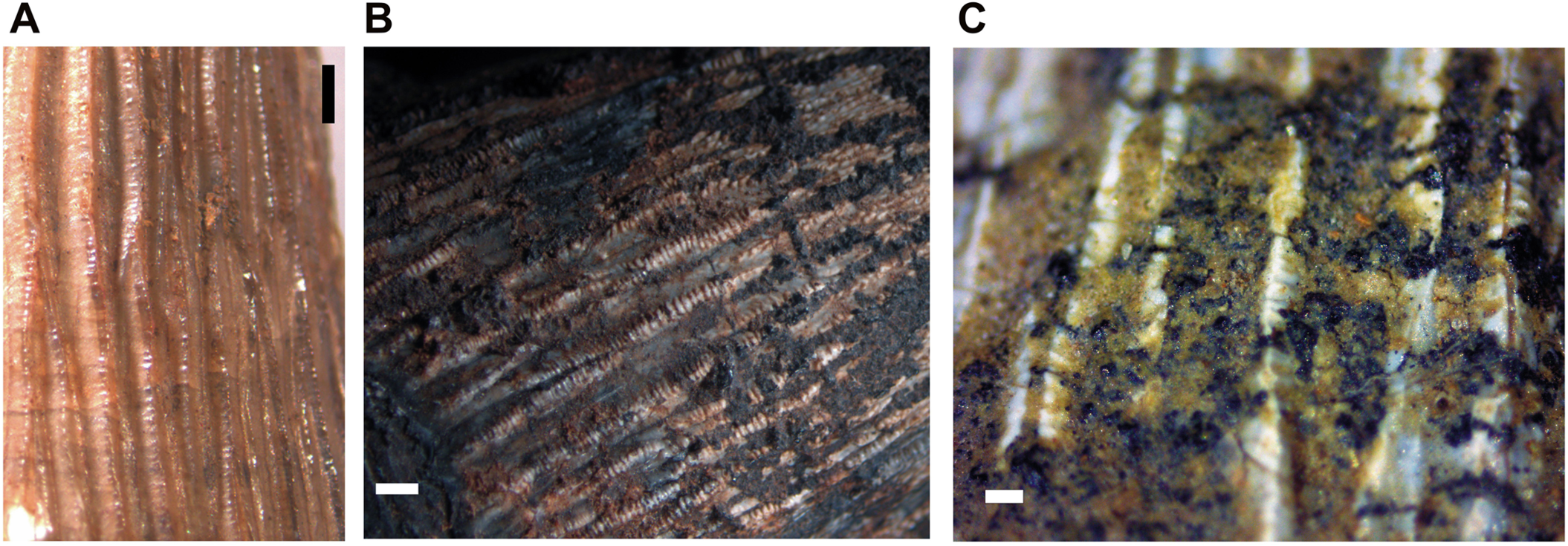
The teeth of Roxochampsa bear not only crenulated carinae as well as additional apicobasal ridges that might have served as additional cutting edges.

The tooth size varies throughout the jaw, a condition that depending on the authorship may be referred to as moderate heterodonty, anisodonty or pseudoheterodonty. The seventh and the eight teeth are the smallest in the lower jaw and the teeth posterior to the 14th grow increasingly smaller until the end of the toothrow. Though only small parts of the fourth alveolus are preserved, Pinheiro and colleagues hypothesize that the respective tooth would have been the largest in the lower jaw, as is commonly the case in crocodylomorphs. The second biggest tooth was the 12th dentary tooth just like in Pepesuchus, while in Itasuchus its the 11th. The anterior-pointed first pair of teeth is also noted for its large size.

Overall Roxochampsa appears to have possessed three slightly different tooth morphotypes. The teeth in the front of the lower jaw are more pointed with rounded crosssections, towards the middle of the jaw become more lanceolate and the posterior-most teeth are relatively blunt. The individual teeth are subconical and monocuspid with generally blunt and rounded tips and a circular crosssection. Between the root and the crown the teeth bear a discretely constricted neck that is not as prominent as what is seen in peirosaurids. The tooth crowns in the anterior and middle parts of the lower jaw show a degree of asymetry, with the outer (labial) surface being wider and convex while the inner (lingual) surface is narrower and ranges from concave to straight due to the tooths inward curvature. The teeth furthermore display "false ziphodonty", which means that the cutting edges of the teeth (carinae) bear crenulations, as opposed to the distinct denticles that define true ziphodonty.

In addition to the crenulated main carinae the teeth of Roxochampsa are furthermore adorned by a number of irregular keels or crests formed by the enamel and the dentine. These crests extend from the base of the base of the tooth crown, where they are sometimes braided, towards the midpoint subparallel to each other, essentially functioning as secondary carinae. Some of the crests found on the anteromedial teeth are furthermore crenulated, something which is especially well developed in the enlarged 12th dentary tooth. However, Pinheiro and colleagues highlight that the crenulation of these ridges differs markedly from the crenulation observed on the primary cutting edge of the teeth, possessing coarser, more individualized crenulations. The presence of such crenulated apico-basal ridges, which lead Pinheiro and colleagues to coin the term "multicrenulated tooth", can also be observed in species of the entirely unrelated Machimosaurus, a thalattosuchian from the Late Jurassic and Early Cretaceous. The crown of the 12th dentary tooth furthermore features blunt, overlapping and hooked structures that extend from the middle of the crown through its topmost quarter before transitioning into what Pinheiro and colleagues describe as a rugose and "scaly" texture at the tooth's apex.

While the upper jaw is not preserved, the occlusal pattern can be determined thanks to scars left by the dentition of the upper jaw on the lateral surface of the dentary. The scars left in Roxochampsa are described to be similar to those also seen in Itasuchus, whereas they are more subtle in Pepesuchus. Based on these, all three taxa would have had interlocking dentition similar to modern crocodiles, which is why this particular pattern is also referred to as "crocodyloid occlusion".

=== Size ===
While no complete skull remains of Roxochampsa are known, attempts to determine its size have been made based on the overall proportions of longirostrine crocodyliforms and the closely related genus Caririsuchus. Following the assumption that longirostrine taxa have a mandibular symphysis that makes up about 60% of the entire mandible length, Pinheiro and colleagues estimate a minimum mandibular length of 25 cm (9.8 in), but concede that since none of the posterior parts are actually preserved in the more complete specimens it may have been even longer. Comparing the mandibular length estimate with the proportions of the much more complete Caririsuchus yields an approximate size of 1–2 m (3 ft 3 in – 6 ft 7 in). Even more fragmentary remains could indicate the existence of individuals around 10 to 15% larger than that.

== Phylogeny ==
The phylogenetic position of what is now known as Roxochampsa has changed drastically across its history, having been initially placed in the neosuchian family Goniopholididae before its 2018 redescription. Pinheiro and colleagues recovered the taxon within Ziphosuchia, which the team broadly split into Notosuchia (consisting of Uruguaysuchidae, Baurusuchidae and Sphagesauridae) and Sebecia. Sebecia itself was found to consist of four families by the team, namely Sebecidae, Mahajangasuchidae, Peirosauridae and Itasuchidae. The family Itasuchidae was originally established in 2004 to include the genera Itasuchus and Malawisuchus as a sister group to Peirosauridae, but eventually fell into disuse as both forms stopped being recovered as close relatives. However, Pinheiro and colleagues recovered a clade formed by Roxochampsa, Itasuchus, Caririsuchus and Pepesuchus all within a polytomy, which they reason should bear the rehabilitated name Itasuchidae. The team specifically redefines the group as every taxon more closely related to Itasuchus than to Sebecus, Mahajangasuchus, Barreirosuchus and Montealtosuchus. In the study′s phylogenetic tree itasuchids are the sister group to a clade formed by Barreirosuchus and Ayllusuchus while Stolokrosuchus was found to be the basalmost member of this branch. Together this clade was recovered as the basalmost offshoot of Sebecia. A similar topology was again recovered by Pinheiro and colleagues in 2023, differing in that Stolokrosuchus and Antaeusuchus were included among itasuchids while Ayllusuchus and Caririsuchus were not found to be part of the clade. In this study′s consensus tree Roxochampsa was recovered in a polytomy alongside Barreirosuchus and Itasuchus basal to Antaeusuchus and Pepesuchus.

Pinheiro et al. (2018)

- Ziphosuchia
  - Notosuchia
  - Sebecia
    - - Stolokrosuchus
      - - - Ayllusuchus
          - Barreirosuchus
        - Itasuchidae
          - Pepesuchus
          - Itasuchus
          - Roxochampsa
          - Caririsuchus
    - - Peirosauridae
      - - Mahajangasuchidae
        - Sebecidae

Pinheiro et al. (2023)

- Ziphosuchia
  - Notosuchia
  - Sebecia
    - Itasuchidae
      - Stolokrosuchus
      - - Itasuchus
        - Barreirosuchus
        - Roxochampsa
        - - Pepesuchus
          - Antaeusuchus
    - - Peirosauridae
      - - Mahajangasuchidae
        - Sebecidae

Also in 2018 the discovery of additional Pepesuchus remains lead to the independent creation of the clade Pepesuchinae, which was similar in its contents to Pinheiro's newly redefined Itasuchidae but placed as a subfamily of Peirosauridae. Since then the contents of both families have similarly expanded, resulting in Ruiz et al. (2024) and Wilberg et al. (2025) recovering almost identical clades but under different names. The former using the name Pepesuchinae and the latter the name Itasuchidae. In both cases Roxochampsa was found to be among the most derived members of its clade, but once again appeared in a polytomy much like in the 2018 Pinheiro publication. The key difference is that in these more recent analysis Pepesuchus was recovered as just outside this grouping, while Amargasuchus is now part of the polytomy. Wilberg and colleagues furthermore provide a semi-strict consensus alternative in an attempt to resolve this polytomy, which indicates that Roxochampsa and Amargasuchus may be sister taxa. The 2025 description of Ibirasuchus also recovers a phylogentic tree similar to those of Ruiz et al. and Wilberg et al., only differing in the presence of Ibirasuchus and absence of Sissokosuchus.

Ruiz et al. (2024)

- - Notosuchia
    - Eunotosuchia
    - Sebecia
      - Doratodon carcharidens
      - - Mahajangasuchidae
        - - Sebecidae
          - Peirosauridae
            - Peirosaurinae
            - Pepesuchinae
              - Kinesuchus
              - - Stolokrosuchus
                - - Rukwasuchus
                  - - Epoidesuchus
                    - - Barreirosuchus
                      - - Pepesuchus
                        - - Amargasuchus
                          - Caririsuchus
                          - Itasuchus
                          - Roxochampsa

Wilberg et al. (2025) (strict consensus)

- - Doratodon
  - - Mahajangasuchidae
    - - Sebecidae
      - - Peirosauridae
        - Itasuchidae
          - Kinesuchus
          - - Stolokrosuchus
            - - Rukwasuchus
              - - Epoidesuchus
                - - - Sissokosuchus
                    - Barreirosuchus
                  - - Pepesuchus
                    - - Caririsuchus
                      - Itasuchus
                      - Amargasuchus
                      - Roxochampsa

Wilberg et al. (2025) (semi-strict consensus)

- - - Sissokosuchus
    - Barreirosuchus
  - - Pepesuchus
    - - Caririsuchus
      - - Itasuchus
        - - Amargasuchus
          - Roxochampsa

== Paleobiology ==
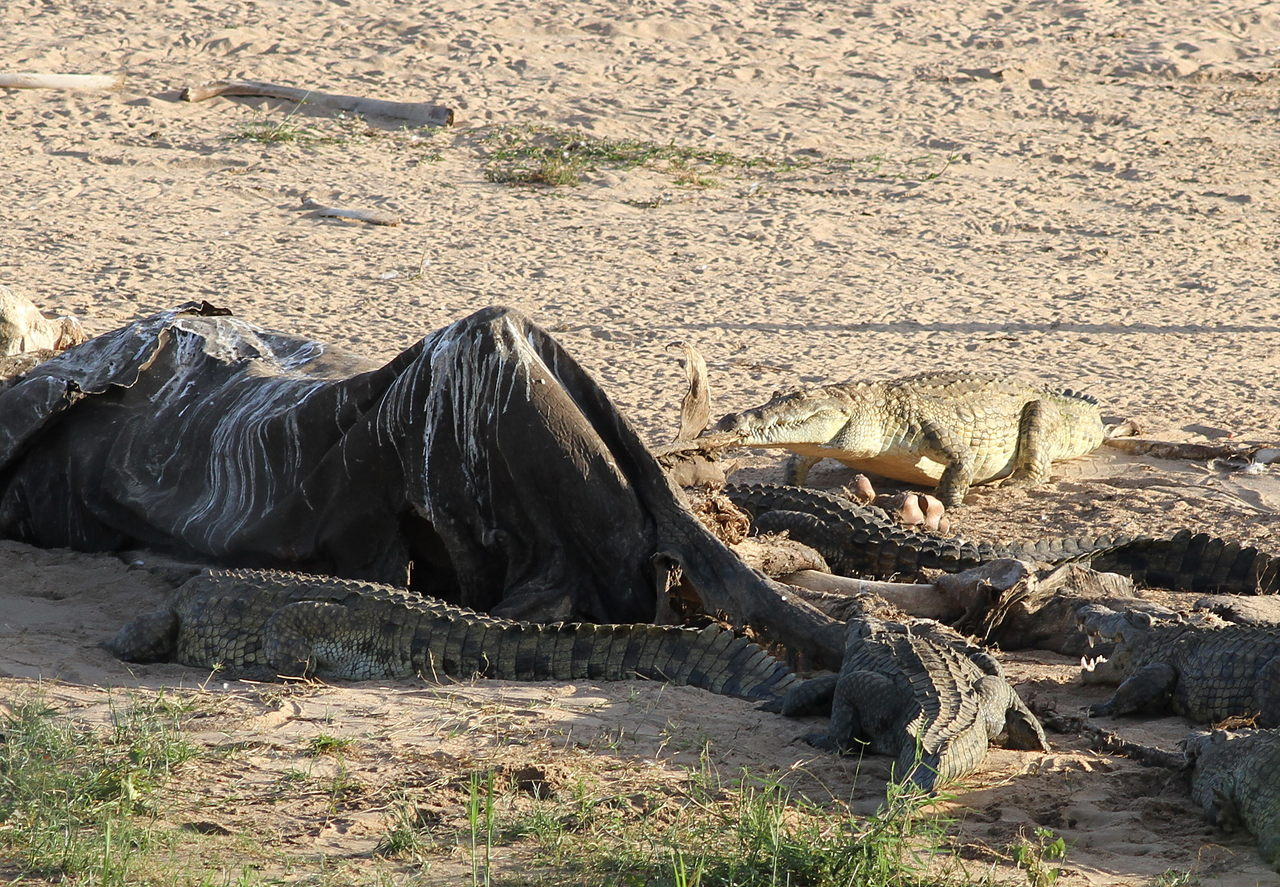
Like modern crocodiles Roxochampsa was likely a generalist predator not above scavenging on the carcasses of large sauropods.

=== Diet ===
Roxochampsa is thought to have been a semi-aquatic predator with a relatively generalist diet consisting of fish, turtles and other hard-shelled animals, small to mid-sized terrestrial vertebrates and possibly the occasional carcass. This hypothesis is based on the festooning of the lower jaw and the more robust mandible, which is closer to modern generalist crocodilians rather than to piscivorous forms such as gharials. The idea of Roxochampsa engaging in scavenging is furthermore supported by a 2021 paper published by Pereira and colleagues in which the team describes the fragmentary epiphysis of a sauropod dinosaur from the Presidente Prudente Formation bearing various bite marks. The oval shape and lack of marks left by true serrations excludes both larger theropods and scavenging mammals. Instead the additional shallow grooves present on the fossil match the kinds of traces left by modern crocodylians when grasping bone and thrashing their head around in order to rip a carcass into smaller pieces. Death rolling, the spinning maneuver performed by modern crocodiles, is not supported due to the absence of other characteristic traces and is unconfirmed behavior in itasuchids. The team ultimately conclude that it was likely an itasuchid such as Roxochampsa to have scavenged on the sauropod, regarding active predation as unlikely both due to the position of the bone and the shere size difference between the sauropod and the suspected trace maker.

The interlocking crocodyloid-like occlusion seen in Roxochampsa is present in both generalist and piscivorous taxa, but serves different functions depending on the ecology. Given the mesorostrine proportions and inferred generalist diet, the interlocking teeth of Roxochampsa would have served to stab and crush prey rather than to strike and impale as in gharials. Another pointer against a specialized piscivorous diet comes in the shape of the posterior teeth, which despite the narrowness of the jaws were relatively blunt. This, combined with the greater force generated in this part jaw, would allow it to crack the shells of hard-shelled prey, which may include various molluscs, crabs, small turtles and perhaps even bone.

The distinct ornamentation of the teeth with crenulated ridges may have played a role in the diet and prey capture methods of Roxochampsa as well. On the one hand the pseudo-denticles could have served a slicing function, on the other they may have come into use when handling wet prey, improving the animal's grip through increased friction and yet another hypothesis suggests that the structures helped strengthen the enamel.

=== Paleoenvironment ===
Roxochampsa is known from two geological formations of Brazil′s Bauru Group, the Late Campanian to Early Maastrichtian Presidente Prudente Formation and the Early Maastrichtian Upper Adamantina Formation. The former is interpreted to have featured high sinuosity meandering river channels during the time of its deposition with sandy bars, crevasse splay and floodplains with an arid to semi-arid climate. The Adamantina Formation preserves what was once an environment defined by braided and meandering rivers in its later strata. It is well known for its great diversity of fossil crocodylomorphs, though their distribution across the various localities and layers of the formation means they were not necessarily all contemporaries.

The site that yielded the best remains of Roxochamspa, AM1 of the Presidente Prudente Formation, preserves the fossils of several dinosaurs. Theropods are represented by a abelisaurid and an indeterminate coelurosaur. The Presidente Prudente Formation also yielded the sauropod Austroposeidon alongside other remains of the clade Aeolosaurini.

The Bauru Group can also be divided into distinct Crocodyliformes Assemblages Zones (CAZs) that encompass specific intervalls across the formations of the group, with site AM1 falling into CAZ4. This assemblage zone also preserves the fossil remains of the closely related Itasuchus (from the AM1 Site of the Presidente Prudente Formation and the Serra da Galga Formation) and Pepesuchus (from the Adamantina Formation). Non-itasuchid crocodyliforms of CAZ4 includes the more robust peirosaurids Uberabasuchus and Peirosaurus (both from the Serra da Galga Formation) as well as the sphagesaurids Labidiosuchus, Morrinhosuchus and Sphagesaurus.
