= Kinesuchus =

Kinesuchus Temporal range: Late Cretaceous, Santonian

Scientific classification
- Kingdom: Animalia
- Phylum: Chordata
- Class: Reptilia
- Clade: Pseudosuchia
- Clade: Crocodylomorpha
- Clade: †Notosuchia
- Family: †Itasuchidae
- Genus: †Kinesuchus; Fillipi et al., 2018

Type species
- †Kinesuchus overoi Fillipi et al., 2018

Extinct genus of reptiles

Kinesuchus (meaning "one crocodile") is an extinct genus of notosuchian crocodylomorph from the Late Cretaceous Bajo de la Carpa Formation of Argentina. The type species, K. overoi, was described in 2018 from the holotype MAU-Pv-CO-583, a partial mandible. The genus hows affinities with the clade Peirosauria, specifically narrow-snouted forms placed in the clades Pepesuchinae or Itasuchidae. While the fossil remains are incomplete, it is distinguished from other peirosaurians by the shape of the lower jaw, which features of an elongated and rounded mandibular symphysis that is marked by a prominent constriction, giving it a somewhat spoon-shaped appearance. It inhabitet what is now northern Patagonia, which during the Santonian featured a warm and semi-arid floodplain environment with extensive river systems and sand dunes that was inhabited by a wide variety of other notosuchians as well as sauropods and theropod dinosaurs.

== History and naming ==
The holotype of Kinesuchus, MAU-Pv-CO-583, is an incomplete lower jaw that was recovered from the Cerro Overo locality of Argentina′s Bajo de la Carpa Formation. The locality, which is located southwest of Rincón de Los Sauces in the Neuquen Province, had previously only yielded fragmentary vertebrate fossils other than the sauropod Overosaurus. The mandible was described in 2018 by Leonardo S. Filippi, Francisco T. Barrios and Alberto C. Garrido.

The genus name Kinesuchus combines the Mapuche word "kiñe", which means "one", and the Ancient Greek "souchos", derived from the Egyptian crocodile-headed deity Sobek. The species name "overoi" meanwhile is a reference to the Cerro Overo locality where the holotype was found. Together the names were chosen to reflect that Kinesuchus was the first of its group to have been recovered from this locality.

== Description ==
Kinesuchus is characterized by possessing an elongated and spatulate mandibular symphysis somewhat resembling that of Itasuchus that indicates a relatively long snout. The mandibular symphysis reachests its greatest width at the level as the presumably enlarged fourth dentary tooth, after which the entire mandible grows narrower until the position of the eight and ninth alveoli, where it is markedly constricted before diverging again from this point onward. Such a constriction is not typical in long-snouted peirosaurids, only found to a lesser degree in Itasuchus and oreinirostral forms like Montealtosuchus.

The dentary bone is dorsoventrally compressed and shallow compared to those of more robust peirosaurids with only slight festooning being present. Ventrally the dentary is flat with only the very front being slightly elevated and forming a gradual curve towards the tip of the jaw. The dentary symphysis extends back until the seventh dentary alveolus like in Itasuchus and ventrally until the 9th alveolus. The splenials contact the dentaries along a V-shaped suture with a pointed end and slightly concave edges similar to what can be observed in other long-snouted peirosaurids. The splenial's contribution to the mandibular ramus is described as comparably broad as in Montealtosuchus and Uberabasuchus. In Kinesuchus the splenial also contributes to the mandibular symphysis, continuing on from the end of the dentary symphysis and making up around 44% of the mandibular symphysis′ length. Through the splenials contribution the symphysis extends until roughly the 12th alveolus, which is further back than in most other peirosaurids. While the extent is unclear in Itasuchus, the symphysis only extends until the 8th alveolus in Gasparinisuchus, the 9th to 10th in Patagosuchus and Pepesuchus, the 10th in Montealtosuchus and Bayomesasuchus and the 11th in Hamadasuchus. The surface of the symphysis is largely flat with the exception of a convex region around the position of the enlarged fourth dentary tooth.

Just behind the mandibular symphysis lies an oval foramen intermandibularis oralis, a feature also seen in a variety of notosuchians. In Kinesuchus this opening is located especially close to the midline suture between the two splenials, with the medial margin located on this suture, a feature that helps distinguish this taxon from other peirosaurs. Like in modern crocodiles this opening likely served as an exit for the mandibular branch of the trigeminal nerve.

=== Dentition ===
The lower jaw of Kinesuchus preserves 18 dental alveoli on either side which are organized into two waves of increasing and decreasing size. The first wave peaks with the fourth alveoli, which is over twice the diameter of the fifth alveolus and as in many other crocodylomorphs would have held the largest tooth in the lower jaw The second peak in size can be seen with the 12 and 13th alveoli, which mirrors the condition seen in Hamadasuchus, Gasparinisuchus and Montealtosuchus rather than what is seen in the narrow snouted Itasuchus, Pepesuchus and Stolokrosuchus. The alveoli in the space between these peaks are described as subequal in size, but larger than the first three alveoli of the lower jaw. The fourth alveolus is separated from its immediate successor by a short toothless gap or diastema as is seen in Bayomesasuchus and most of the alveoli are well separated by distinct bony septa. Conversely, further in the back of the jaw, behind the tenth alveolus, the alvoeli are confluent with each other, sitting in a groove located between the dentary and splenial.

The individual teeth can be separated into incisiviforms, caniniforms and postcaniniforms, though very few are actually preserved in the type specimen and all share a conical shape. The preserved incisiform is described as medium-sized with an anterodorsal (forward and upward) curvature and lacking a cutting edge. The fourth alveolus would have housed an enlarged caniniform, the largest in the lower jaw. The other preserved teeth are located much further in the back of the jaw, being the tenth and 12th. The tenth tooth is described as almost triangular with a slight labiolingual curvature while being positioned in a way that causes it to project outward from the jaw. The much larger 12th tooth meanwhile is described as more triangular but less curved while projecting outward at the same 75° angle. Unlike the anterior incisiform these posteriorforms not only possess carinae but furthermore preserve denticles lining the cutting edge, making them ziphodont.

== Phylogeny ==
The relationship between Kinesuchus and other notosuchians has been subject to change throughout its research history. Filippi and colleagues initially assigned Kinesuchus simply to the family Peirosauridae, but did not provide a more in-depth phylogenetic analysis. In their description of Colhuehuapisuchus Lamanna and colleagues likewise do not provide a full phylogenetic analysis, but do indicate that they regard Kinesuchus as more closely related to narrow-snouted peirosaurids such as Itasuchus and Pepesuchus.

Both the phylogenetic analyses of Wilberg et al. 2025 and Ruiz et al. 2024 place Kinesuchus as the basalmost members of nearly identical clades composed of a number of putatively semi-aquatic and narrow-snouted notosuchians. The two studies chiefly differ in the nomenclature of these clades rather than their contents, with Wilberg and colleagues placing these forms in the family Itasuchidae while Ruiz and colleagues use the name Pepesuchinae. The former places the clade as the sister group to Peirosauridae, the latter as a subfamily of it and sister to Peirosaurinae. The same position was also recovered by Iori et al. in 2025 in their description of Ibirasuchus.

- - Notosuchia
    - Eunotosuchia
    - Sebecia
      - Doratodon carcharidens
      - - Mahajangasuchidae
        - - Sebecidae
          - Peirosauridae
            - Peirosaurinae
            - Pepesuchinae
              - Kinesuchus
              - - Stolokrosuchus
                - - Rukwasuchus
                  - - Epoidesuchus
                    - - Barreirosuchus
                      - - Pepesuchus
                        - - Amargasuchus
                          - Caririsuchus
                          - Itasuchus
                          - Roxochampsa

- - Doratodon
  - - Mahajangasuchidae
    - - Sebecidae
      - - Peirosauridae
        - Itasuchidae
          - Kinesuchus
          - - Stolokrosuchus
            - - Rukwasuchus
              - - Epoidesuchus
                - - - Sissokosuchus
                    - Barreirosuchus
                  - - Pepesuchus
                    - - Caririsuchus
                      - Itasuchus
                      - Amargasuchus
                      - Roxochampsa

== Paleobiology ==
Kinesuchus was discovered at the Cerro Overo locality of Argentina′s Bajo de la Carpa Formation. The Bajo de la Carpa Formation has yielded a plethora of fossil remains across its various localities, including fish, turtles, squamates and a variety of both avian and non-avian dinosaurs. Among the largest animals were sauropods such as Overosaurus, Bonitasaura, Traukutitan, Rinconsaurus, Inawentu and Yeneen. The top predator of the formation was most likely the large megaraptoran Tratayenia, but the fauna also included the mid-sized abelisaur Viavenator and Llukalkan as well as several smaller theropods such as Velocisaurus, Alvarezsaurus and Achillesaurus. Early birds are also known from Bajo de la Carpa, namely the basal avialeans Patagopteryx and Neuquenornis. Crocodylomorph remains are likewise common, with five taxa known from the area around Neuquen City, namely Notosuchus, Microsuchus, Comahuesuchus and Wargosuchus alongside an additional peirosaurid. Other Bajo de la Carpa crocodylomorphs in addition to these and Kinesuchus include Gasparinisuchus, Cynodontosuchus, Peirosaurus, Neuquensuchus and Barrosasuchus. Aquatic fauna is represented by the remains of lungfish and side-necked turtles such as podocnemidids and the chelid Lomalatachelys. While most of these are spread out across multiple localities, Overosaurus, Yeneen, Inawentu, both Llukalkan and Viavenator as well as the elasmarian ornithopod Mahuidacursor all come from the Cerro Overo – La Invernada locality that also yielded Kinesuchus.

The environment of the Bajo de la Carpa Formation varied across its range. Around Sierra Barrosa the deposits indicate wide and shallow rivers with low-sinuosity, meaning their flow was relatively straight rather than winding and meandering. In the Cerro Senillosa sector the river channels appear to have been intertwined and are associated with sand dunes in the distal parts of the floodplain. A distal floodplain environment also dominates the Neuquén area, with the intertwined river channels being subject to periods of drying. The Cerro Overo – La Invernada area specifically indicates an anastomosed river system within a muddy floodplain with sandy load paleochannels deposits. Overall the climate of the Cretaceous Bajo de la Carpa Formation has been described as warm and semi-arid.
