= Presidente Prudente Formation =

Geological formation in Brazil

- Stratigraphic range: Late Campanian-Early Maastrichtian
- Type: Geological formation
- Unit of: Bauru Group
- Overlies: Adamantina Formation

Lithology
- Primary: Sandstone and mudstone

Location
- Coordinates: 22.1°S 51.4°W
- Approximate paleocoordinates: 26.2°S 34.6°W
- Region: São Paulo
- Country: Brazil
- Extent: Paraná Basin
- Presidente Prudente Formation (Brazil)

The Presidente Prudente Formation is a geological formation of the Bauru Group in the Paraná Basin, located in Brazil whose strata date back to the Late Campanian to Early Maastrichtian.

== History ==
Since at least 1953, parts of this formation, such as where the formation once outcropped along Raposo Tavares Road, have been lost to urban development.

== Paleofauna ==
=== Crocodyliformes ===
Crocodyliformes reported from the Presidente Prudente Formation
Genus	Species	Material	Notes	Images
Pepesuchus	P. deiseae	"a nearly complete skeleton and skull"	A itasuchid notosuchian	
Roxochampsa	R. paulistanus		A Itasuchid notosuchian; previously known as "Goniopholis" paulistanus	

=== Turtles ===
Turtles reported from the Presidente Prudente Formation
Genus	Species	Material	Notes	Images
Bauruemys	B. elegans	Skulls	A podocnemidid side-necked turtle	
Roxochelys	R. wanderleyi		A podocnemidid side-necked turtle	

=== Dinosaurs ===
Dinosaurs reported from the Presidente Prudente Formation
Genus	Species	Material	Notes	Images
Abelisauridae indet.	Indeterminate	Maxilla	A abelisaurid theropod; previously identified as carcharodontosaurid.	
Abelisauridae indet.	Indeterminate	A middle tail vertebra	A abelisaurid; Body length estimates suggest the animal was roughly 3.4 meters long as an adult, making it one of the smallest known abelisaurids.	
Austroposeidon	A. magnificus	"cervical, dorsal, and sacral vertebrae, along with a cervical rib and one complete dorsal vertebra"	A lithostrotian titanosaur	
Brasilotitan	B. nemophagus		A lithostrotian titanosaur	
