= Amargasuchus =

Amargasuchus Temporal range: Early Cretaceous ~Barremian–Aptian

Scientific classification
- Kingdom: Animalia
- Phylum: Chordata
- Class: Reptilia
- Clade: Pseudosuchia
- Clade: Crocodylomorpha
- Clade: †Notosuchia
- Family: †Itasuchidae
- Genus: †Amargasuchus; Chiappe 1988

Species
- A. minor Chiappe 1988 (type)

Extinct genus of reptiles

Amargasuchus is an extinct genus of notosuchian crocodylomorph from the Barremian to Aptian La Amarga Formation of Argentina. Amargasuchus is only known from a single specimen, a partial maxilla of small size described in 1988. It was originally assigned to the family Trematochampsidae, but this clade has since been abandoned. Today, Amargasuchus is associated with either the clade Pepesuchinae or Itasuchidae, which are nearly identical in some studies. Amargasuchus inhabited a terrestrial paleoenvironment that existed during the Early Cretaceous in the Neuquén basin and was characterized by a system of braided rivers, lakes, and alluvial plains. Sauropod, abelisauroid, and stegosaurian dinosaurs have also been found existing in the Neuquén basin at this time.

== History and naming ==
The holotype of Amargasuchus, MACN-N-12, was discovered in 1984 within the lower La Amarga Formation (specifically the Puesto Antigual Member) in association with the dicraeosaurid sauropod dinosaur Amargasaurus. The group that discovered the fossil remains was led by paleontologist José Fernando Bonaparte and supported by the National Geographic Society. The incomplete right maxilla was described in 1988 by Luis M. Chiappe and initially assigned to the family Trematochampsidae.

The name Amargasuchus minor alludes to the La Amarga Formation where the type material was found and the small size of the animal.

== Description ==
Amargasuchus is characterized by a long and narrow snout, initially described by Chiappe as being longer than that of Trematochampsa. The maxilla was moderately high, growing taller towards the back of the skull, but overall remains distinctly shallower than that of the deep snouted sebecosuchians. Looking at the maxilla from above shows that the outer margins form a straight edge rather that being distinctly wave-like in appearance. The ventral edge meanwhile is well festooned when looking at the skull in side view, creating two distinct waves within the toothrow. The first of these waves houses the largest maxillary teeth, which likely sat only a short distance behind the transition from premaxilla to maxilla. Towards the back of the maxilla, approximately at the level of the 13th maxillary alveoli, the bone shows signs of the presence of an antorbital fenestra. The surface of the maxilla is ornamented by heavy sculpting, which is most pronounced along the mid-section of the bone. Here the surface is covered by enlarged and deep pits which transition into elongated grooves towards the back of the element.

The holotype maxilla of Amargasuchus preserves 13 tooth sockets, though the exact count is unknown, as there may be at least one more anterior alveolus that was not preserved. The maxillary alveoli are laterally compressed, which would also extend to the teeth, and show little variation in size. The fifth and sixth alveoli, which may actually be the sixth and seventh, are the largest tooth sockets, while the remaining are smaller and of approximately equal size to each other. Despite the greater size of the aforementioned pair of alveoli, they are not hypertrophied. The tooth sockets are each separated by bony walls of varying thickness. The toothrow extends far back in the maxilla, extending beyond the start of the suborbital fenestra.

As indicated by the species name, Amargasuchus minor was a relatively small animal. The preserved portion of the maxilla measures approximately 4.16 cm (1.64 in) in length, which suggests a total skull length of around 9–10 cm (3.5–3.9 in).

== Phylogeny ==
Amargasuchus was initially considered to be a member of the family Trematochampsidae, at the time placed in the suborder Mesosuchia. Later studies however came to the conclusion that the family's namesake, Trematochampsa taqueti, was a nomen dubium based on undiagnostic and chimeric remains and that the family itself had become a wastebasket taxon. This led to many former trematochampsid taxa being placed in the family Peirosauridae or Itasuchidae. The specific nomenclature and taxonomy varies between authors, as some split Peirosauridae into the subfamilies Peirosaurinae and Pepesuchinae, with the latter being similar in its composition to Itasuchidae, itself considered to be the sister group to Peirosauridae.

This is exemplified by the phylogenetic results of Ruiz et al. 2024 and Wilberg et al. 2025, who effectively recovered the same results but under different naming schemes. In both studies Amargasuchus was recovered as a derived member of its family, with the strict consensus tree placing it in a polytomy consisting of itself, Caririsuchus, Itasuchus and Roxochampsa. Other than the inclusion of Sissokosuchus the two phylogenetic trees differ mostly in the used nomenclature, with Ruiz and colleagues naming the clade Pepesuchinae while Wilberg and colleagues use the name Itasuchidae. Furthermore, the Wilberg recovered a semi-strict consensus tree that does resolve this polytomy, recovering Amargasuchus as the sister taxon to Roxochampsa. A similar result was also recovered by Iori et al. in 2025, retaining the same topology with Amargasuchus in a derived polytomy and only differing in the exclusion of Sissokosuchus and inclusion of Ibirasuchus.

Ruiz et al. (2024)

- - Notosuchia
    - Eunotosuchia
    - Sebecia
      - Doratodon carcharidens
      - - Mahajangasuchidae
        - - Sebecidae
          - Peirosauridae
            - Peirosaurinae
            - Pepesuchinae
              - Kinesuchus
              - - Stolokrosuchus
                - - Rukwasuchus
                  - - Epoidesuchus
                    - - Barreirosuchus
                      - - Pepesuchus
                        - - Amargasuchus
                          - Caririsuchus
                          - Itasuchus
                          - Roxochampsa

Wilberg et al. (2025) (strict consensus)

- - Doratodon
  - - Mahajangasuchidae
    - - Sebecidae
      - - Peirosauridae
        - Itasuchidae
          - Kinesuchus
          - - Stolokrosuchus
            - - Rukwasuchus
              - - Epoidesuchus
                - - - Sissokosuchus
                    - Barreirosuchus
                  - - Pepesuchus
                    - - Caririsuchus
                      - Itasuchus
                      - Amargasuchus
                      - Roxochampsa

Wilberg et al. (2025) (semi-strict consensus)

- - - Sissokosuchus
    - Barreirosuchus
  - - Pepesuchus
    - - Caririsuchus
      - - Itasuchus
        - - Amargasuchus
          - Roxochampsa

== Paleobiology ==
Amargasuchus is known from the Puesto Antigual Member of the Barremian to Aptian La Amarga Formation, located in western Argentina. The sediments of the La Amarga Formation were accumulated by alluvial river systems that featured not just fluvial channels but also swamps and paleosols. The Puesto Antigual Member also preserves other fossil remains, including several specimens of the mammal Vincelestes, the abelisaur Ligabueino and the teeth of what may be a tetanuran theropod. Herbivorous dinosaurs are represented by the fragmentary remains of a stegosaur and the sauropod dinosaurs Amargasaurus and Amargatitanis.
