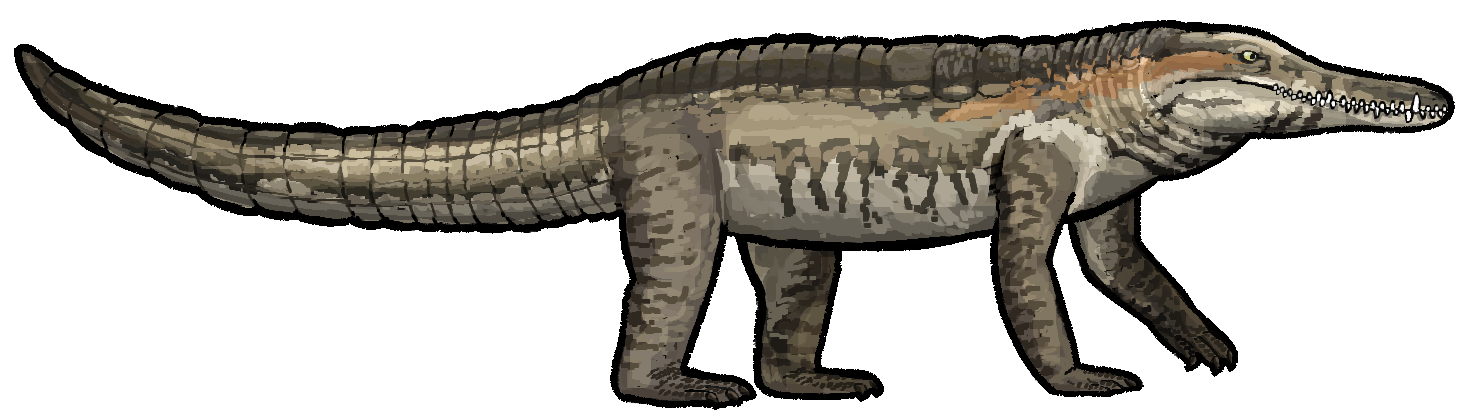
- Life Restoration

Scientific classification
- Kingdom: Animalia
- Phylum: Chordata
- Class: Reptilia
- Clade: Pseudosuchia
- Clade: Crocodylomorpha
- Clade: †Notosuchia
- Family: †Itasuchidae
- Genus: †Epoidesuchus; Ruiz et al., 2024
- Species: †E. tavaresae

Binomial name
- †Epoidesuchus tavaresae Ruiz et al., 2024

= Epoidesuchus =

Epoidesuchus Temporal range: Campanian–Maastrichtian

Extinct genus of reptile

Epoidesuchus is an extinct itasuchid notosuchian from the Late Cretaceous (Campanian to Maastrichtian) Adamantina Formation of Brazil. Like other members of the Pepesuchinae and unlike the closely related members of Peirosaurinae, Epoidesuchus had long and gracile jaws, which may indicate that they were semi-aquatic animals more similar to modern crocodilians. The genus is monotypic, meaning it only contains a single species, Epoidesuchus tavaresae.

== History and naming ==
The holotype specimen of Epoidesuchus were found in 2011 in outcrops of the Adamantina Formation in the Brazilian municipality of Catanduva. The specimen; which consists of a nearly tubular snout, a partial skull roof, parts of the mandible and a single rib; was recovered from a road cut and subsequently sent to the Museu de Paleontologia Professor Antonio Celso de Arruda Campos. The material was first identified as a peirosaurid that same year by Fabiano Iori. The animal was eventually fully described in 2024 and recognized as a distinct species and genus by Juan V. Ruiz and colleagues, who coined the name Epoidesuchus tavaresae.

The name Epoidesuchus is a combination of the Ancient Greek "epoide" meaning "enchanted" and "souchus", a commonly used suffix among crocodilians that hearkens back to the Egyptian god Sobek. The use of "epoide" is a reference to the city of Catanduva, which is also known as the "Magic Spell City". The species name on the other hand honors Sandra Simionato Tavares, a paleontologist and the director of the museum that houses the type specimen.

== Description ==
=== Cranium ===
The skull of Epoidesuchus is known from various incomplete remains, including much of the skull table, a piece of a lacrimal and a skull fragment that preserves parts of the region that sits before the eyes. Unlike modern crocodiles, Epoidesuchus possessed a small opening in the skull before the eyes, known as the antorbital fossa. The fossa is separated from the eyesocket by the lacrimal bone, with the distance between it and the eyesocket being longer than the fossa itself is high. The skull table is dominated by two large openings, the supratemporal fenestra, the rims of which are on level with the rest of the skull roof rather than raised. The skull roof extends the furthest back with the squamosal bones, which project back and upward even after their lateral processes connect to the parietal bone. Notably, beyond this point the bones lack the ornamentation that is present across most the rest of the skull.

=== Lower jaw ===
Another largely complete element of Epoidesuchus is the left hemimandible, which preserves most of the dentary bone. The size and shape of the mandible suggests that Epoidesuchus had a long and narrow snout, with the preserved portion alone measuring 35 cm (14 in). It's roughly constant in height safe for a small increase towards the back of the skull. The dentaries are also not compressed mediolaterally but have a convex outer surface, which supports the placement of Epoidesuchus within Pepesuchinae. The edges of the lower jaw seem to run subparallel to the length of the skull as a whole and don't display noticeable narrowing towards the tip nor widening towards the back. However, there is a noticeable notch in the lower jaw close to the fourth dentary tooth, which might accommodate an enlarged maxillary tooth when the jaws were closed.

=== Dentition ===
The lower jaw preserves a total of 14 teeth of varying size and diameter, with the individual teeth and alveoli separated by prominent gaps that likely serve to allow the teeth of the upper and lower jaw to interlock. The distance between the individual teeth or alveoli is relatively consistent throughout the lower jaw, with the exception of the region between the sixth and ninth dentary teeth. The sixth and seventh tooth are very closely spaced, as are the eight and ninth, with prominent diastemas separating them from each other as well as the fifth and tenth dentary teeth. The eight tooth also happens to be the smallest tooth in the lower jaw, whereas the 11th and 13th are the largest. All teeth are laterally compressed, but unlike other peirosaurids they lack the serrations or crenulations that would make them ziphodont or pseudo-ziphodont, something that Epoidesuchus shares with the African Stolokrosuchus.

=== Size ===
The size of the lower jaw indicates that Epoidesuchus was at least 50% larger than other peirosaurids that inhabited the Adamantina Formation, which includes Itasuchus, Pepesuchus, Roxochampsa and Montealtosuchus.

== Phylogeny ==
The phylogenetic analysis conducted during the description of Epoidesuchus recovers a tree that aligns with the so-called "Sebecia hypothesis", meaning that peirosaurids are found to clade with the families Sebecidae and Mahajangasuchidae. This hypothesis stands opposed to the "Sebecosuchia hypothesis", in which sebecids are most closely related to baurusuchids while peirosaurids clade with mahajangasuchids and uruguaysuchids. Within Peirosauridae, Ruiz and colleagues recovered a clear split between two distinct lineages, peirosaurines and pepesuchines. While the former are described as semi-aquatic to terrestrial animals with oreinirostral snouts (meaning their snouts appeared tall and domed) and includes taxa like Hamadasuchus, Uberabasuchus and Montealtosuchus, the later consists primarily of animals that are hypothesized to be more aquatic, possessing elongated or flattened snouts as seen in Caririsuchus, Roxochampsa and Pepesuchus.

- - Notosuchia
    - Eunotosuchia
    - Sebecia
      - Doratodon carcharidens
      - - Mahajangasuchidae
        - - Sebecidae
          - Peirosauridae
            - Peirosaurinae
            - Pepesuchinae
              - Kinesuchus
              - - Stolokrosuchus
                - - Rukwasuchus
                  - - Epoidesuchus
                    - - Barreirosuchus
                      - - Pepesuchus
                        - - Amargasuchus
                          - Caririsuchus
                          - Itasuchus
                          - Roxochampsa

Though the name Pepesuchinae is used by Ruiz and colleagues to describe the clade, they do note that following the terminology of Pinheiro et al. 2018 Peirosauridae would be restricted to the clade they dub Peirosaurinae. Their version of Pepesuchinae meanwhile would be separated into the clade Itasuchidae (which would be composed of Pepesuchus and the recovered polytomy) and various more basal taxa. Subsequently, following this taxonomy Epoidesuchus would not be regarded as a pepesuchine nor an itasuchid, even though its position would not change. Furthermore, the description of Epoidesuchus does not take into account the 2024 nomenclature published by Leardi and colleagues, in which they coin the clade Peirosauria, which consists of peirosaurids, itasuchids and mahajangasuchids. Within Peirosauria, Peirosauridae and Itasuchidae are roughly equivalent to the clades Peirosaurinae and Pepesuchinae as recovered by Ruiz and colleagues.

Nearly identical results to those of Ruiz and colleagues were later recovered by Wilberg et al. in 2025, only differing in the inclusion of Sissokosuchus as the sister taxon to Barreirosuchus and the use of the Pinheiro et al. 2018 nomenclature.

== Paleobiology ==
Like several other members of Pepesuchinae, Epoidesuchus had elongated and narrow jaws that are wildly different from the tall, deep skulls seen in peirosaurines. Such a skull shape is unique among notosuchians, but much more widespread among neosuchians like goniopholidids and modern crocodilians, which may suggest a similar semi-aquatic lifestyle. Pepesuchines are however not perfect anatomical analogues to neosuchians, as they still have some adaptations seen in more terrestrial groups. Rather than having eyes located atop the head, as would be useful for laying in ambush with the body submerged, the eyes of Epoidesuchus faced towards the side of the skull. Considering both these similarities and differences might suggest that though more semi-aquatic than their relatives, pepesuchines such as Epoidesuchus were still less dependent on water than modern crocodilians. Semi-aquatic habits have also been reported from mahajangasuchine notosuchians, which includes Mahajangasuchus and Kaprosuchus, as well as the sebecid Lorosuchus, with the latter being much closer in anatomy to pepesuchines. This might suggest some degree of convergence between pepesuchines and Lorosuchus specifically. Ruiz and colleagues note that pepesuchines often occur in units were neosuchians are rare or even absent. Epoidesuchus for example was native to Brazil's Adamantina Formation, which is part of the Bauru Group. Though the Bauru Group is renowned for its diverse notosuchian fauna, only a single neosuchian has been recovered from any of the formations that are part of the unit. Said neosuchian is Titanochampsa, which has so far only been found within the sediments of the Marilia Formation.
