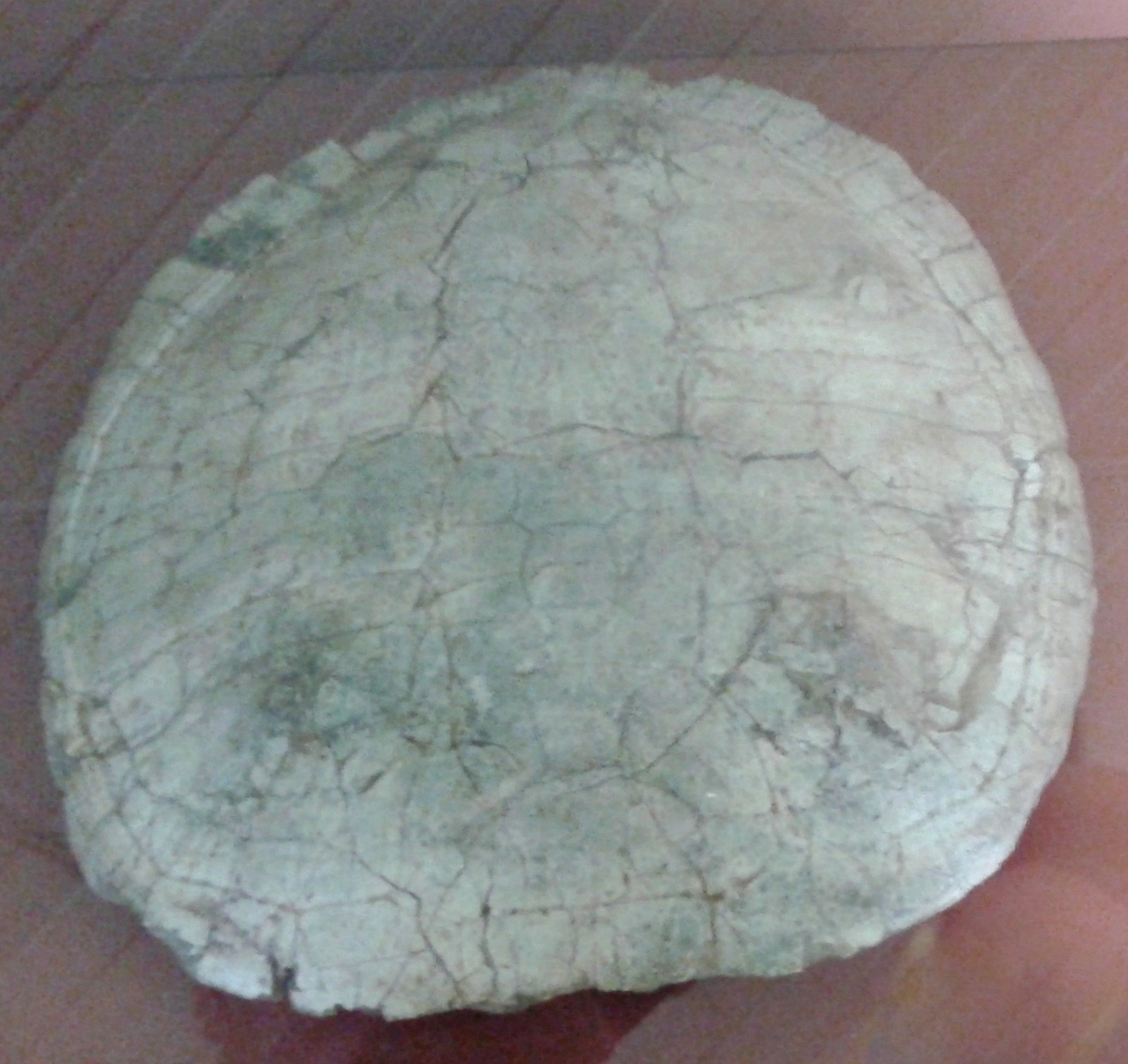

Scientific classification
- Kingdom: Animalia
- Phylum: Chordata
- Class: Reptilia
- Order: Testudines
- Suborder: Pleurodira
- Family: Podocnemididae
- Genus: †Bauruemys; Suárez 1969

Species
- †Bauruemys brasiliensis Staesche, 1937; †Bauruemys elegans Suárez, 1969

= Bauruemys =

Bauruemys Temporal range: Campanian ~84–80 Ma

Extinct genus of turtles

Bauruemys is an extinct genus of turtles in the family Podocnemididae.

A study on the skulls of the Late Cretaceous stem-podocnemidid Bauruemys elegans from the Presidente Prudente Formation in Brazil is published by Mariani & Romano (2017), who interpret all specimens as belonging to the same species and likely to the same population, assess the ontogenetic changes in the skull of B. elegans and tentatively assess the changes of eating preference habits over ontogeny in the species.
