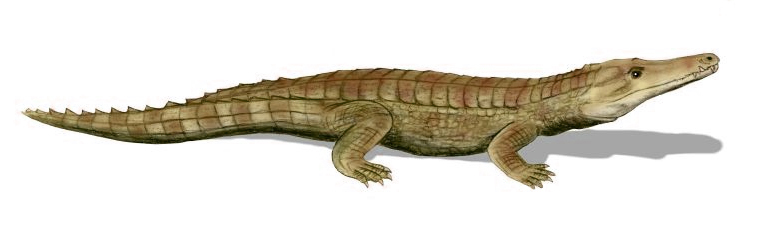
- Restoration of the itasuchid Itasuchus jesuinoi

Scientific classification
- Kingdom: Animalia
- Phylum: Chordata
- Class: Reptilia
- Clade: Pseudosuchia
- Clade: Crocodylomorpha
- Clade: †Notosuchia
- Clade: †Peirosauria
- Family: †Itasuchidae; Carvalho et al., 2004

Genera
- †Amargasuchus; †Barreirosuchus; †Caririsuchus; †Epoidesuchus; †Fortignathus; †Ibirasuchus; †Itasuchus; †Kinesuchus; †Pepesuchus; †Roxochampsa; †Rukwasuchus; †Sissokosuchus; †Stolokrosuchus?

= Itasuchidae =

Itasuchidae Temporal range: Aptian–Maastrichtian

Extinct family of reptiles

Itasuchidae is a Gondwanan family of crocodyliforms that lived during the Cretaceous period. It was a clade of terrestrial crocodyliforms that evolved a rather dog-like form, and were terrestrial carnivores.

== Phylogeny ==
The phylogenetic analysis of Carvalho et al. (2004) found a sister relationship between Malawisuchus and Itasuchus. They named this node family Itasuchidae, and found it to be a member of Peirosauroidea. However, their analysis didn't include any neosuchians or (other than Itasuchus) trematochampsids. Later studies placed Itasuchus as a trematochampsid (and not closely related to the more derived notosuchian Malawisuchus). In their 2018 paper renaming "Goniopholis" paulistanus as Roxochampsa, Pinheiro et al. (2018) redefined Itasuchidae so that only ziphosuchians more closely related to Itasuchus than Barreirosuchus, Montealtosuchus, Mahajangasuchus, and Sebecus were included in the family.
