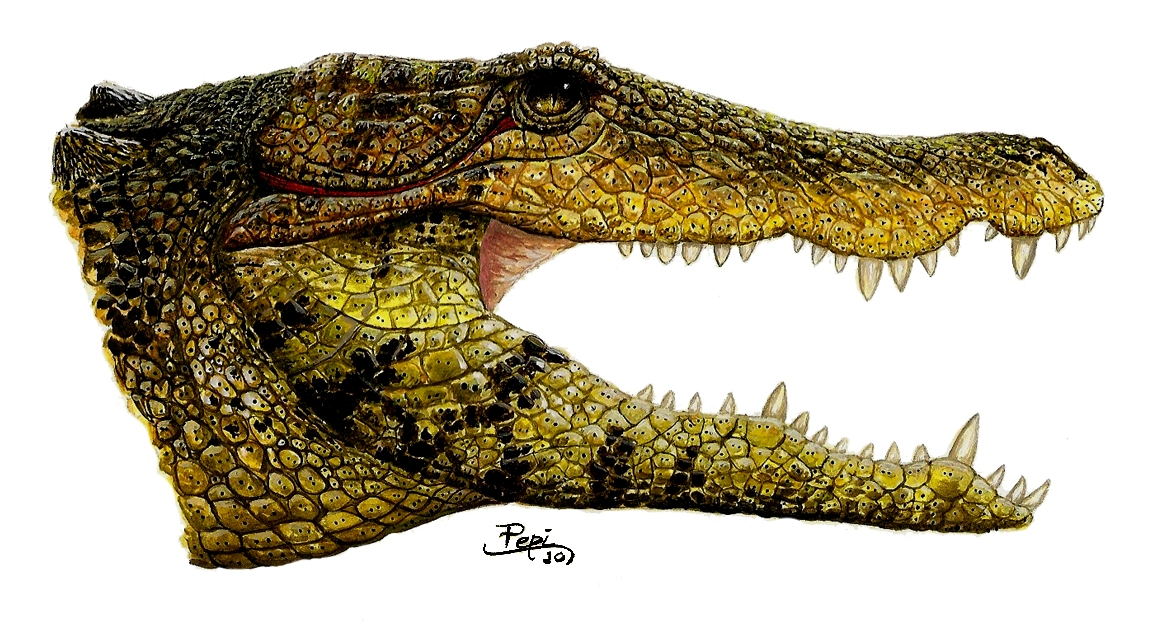
- Profile life restoration

Scientific classification
- Kingdom: Animalia
- Phylum: Chordata
- Class: Reptilia
- Clade: Pseudosuchia
- Clade: Crocodylomorpha
- Clade: †Notosuchia
- Family: †Itasuchidae
- Genus: †Barreirosuchus; Iori & Garcia, 2012

Type species
- †Barreirosuchus franciscoi Iori & Garcia, 2012

= Barreirosuchus =

Barreirosuchus Temporal range: Late Cretaceous, Turonian–Campanian

Extinct genus of reptiles

Barreirosuchus is an extinct genus of itasuchid notosuchian known from the Late Cretaceous of São Paulo State, southeastern Brazil. It contains a single species, Barreirosuchus franciscoi. It most closely resembles Caririsuchus camposi from the Araripe Basin and Itasuchus jesuinoi also from the Bauru Basin, and shares with them several synapomorphies.

== History and naming ==
Barreirosuchus is known only from the holotype specimen MPMA-04-0012/00, an undeformed posterior portion of the skull with six teeth and a series of four vertebrae, two dorsal and two sacral. It was found in the year 2000 four kilometer from Monte Alto County, in the escarpment of the Serra do Jabuticabal within the Bauru Basin, corresponding to the Turonian to Santonian or possibly even Campanian Adamantina Formation. The fossil was recovered near a cave with the upper surface of the skull exposed and the anterior parts of the snout already eroded away. A more detailed redescription of the skull material was later published by Fachini and colleagues in 2025, not simply focusing on the external anatomy of the specimen but also detailing the internal anatomy, which were acquired via computed tomography.

Barreirosuchus was first named by Fabiano Vidoi Iori and Karina Lucia Garcia in 2012 and the type species is Barreirosuchus franciscoi. The generic name is derived from the name of the rural district of Barreiro, where the holotype was found. The specific name honors the paleontologist Cledinei Aparecido Francisco from the Museu de Paleontologia de Monte de Alto, for technical support during the excavations of the holotype.

== Description ==
The skull of Barreirosuchus is described as robust and though moderately tall still wider than tall. While most of the snout is missing the head has been inferred to have been roughly triangular in shape. Overall it closely resembles Caririsuchus and Pepsuchus, two closely related genera. The surface of the skull is ornamented by a pattern of small, circular pits, It has been interpreted as having had a flattened (platyrostral) snout. ridges and grooves, which are most prominent on the jugal and the skull table.

A prominent feature of Barreirosuchus is the presence of a median boss, a raised dome-like structure located before the eyes formed by the maxillae, prefrontals, lacrimal bones, nasal boness, jugals and the frontal bone. Such a boss is also present in Pepesuchus and some species of the extant genus Crocodylus including the Siamese crocodile and the extinct Crocodylus checchiai.

Little is preserved of the maxilla, but based on the holotype skull they were in contact with both the prefrontal and lacrimal bones, the paired nasal bones and the jugal. Iori and Garcia note that the contact between maxilla and jugal is relatively smooth rather than interfingering, suggesting that the bones overlapped each other. A notable feature unique to Barreirosuchus among peirosaurians is that the maxilla also participates in the orbital margin. Dorsally the bone forms a slender and elongated process that extends into the space between lacrimal and jugal until reaching the orbit. The nasals are likewise poorly preserved in the holotype and missing most their length, but it has been observed that they form distinct projections that inserts themselves both into the space between the prefrontal and frontal bone as well as into the space between the prefrontals and lacrimals. Furthermore, each nasal bears a small medial protrusion close to the contact with the prefrontal. There is no evidence for the presence of an antorbital fenestra, but there is a depression where the opening is be located in Stolokrosuchus

The lacrimal has been described as roughly rectangular or columnar and extends anterior beyond the tip of the neighbouring prefrontal. Near what Iori and Garcia described as the contact with the jugal the lacrimal bears a recess that delimits the rostral boss. Following Fachini and colleagues however, the contact between lacrimal and jugal is a lot more limited thanks to the facial process of the maxilla, restricting their meeting to a small part in the anteroventral orbital region. The team further highlights how the orientation of the posterior process the bone changes. Towards the front the lacrimal surface is directed mediolaterally, meaning comparably flat to even concave, but the process becomes increasingly dorsomedially sloping closer to the eyesocket as it forms the outer wall of the rostral boss. While it does not extend as far forward as the lacrimal, the prefrontal is actually more elongated and slightly inclined towards the back of the snout. Both the lacrimal and prefrontal form part of the opening eyesockets and bear a notch thought to be associated with the presence of a palpebral bone. The eyesockets of Barreirosuchus are located dorsolaterally, meaning they were positioned higher up on the skull than in terrestrial forms such as peirosaurids and baurusuchids. The frontal, as is related forms, consists of a wedge-shaped anterior process that makes up half the bones length and inserts itself between the prefrontals and the nasals and a rectangular posterior process located on the skull table. The surface of the anterior process appears slightly concave due to the fact that the edges of the eyesockets are weakly elevated.

The skull table is rectangular and broader than wide. Here the frontal comes in contact with the postorbitals towards its sides and the parietal bone along a highly sinuous suture while also forming a small part of the almost circular supratemporal fenestrae. The outer edge of the skull table is formed by the postorbital and the squamosal, which overhang the side of the skull including the infratemporal fenestra and the ear opening. While the prefrontal and lacrimal show signs of articulating with the palpebral, no such point of articulation is present on the postorbital. The postorbital and squamosal superficially contact each other around halfway down the length of the supratemporal fenestra, but looking at the skull from the side shows that the squamosal actually underlies its neighbour, separating it from the quadratojugal. The squamosal extends backward into a long straight process that surpasses the posterior edge of the parietal, which it contacts medially, and the occipital surface before ending in a rounded point. The parietal forms the space between the fenestrae and the medial posterior edge of the skull table, giving it an hourglass-shape. Looking at the skull from behind meanwhile shows that the parietal also bears a depression down along the midline flanked by two irregular processes, starting not far behind the supratemporal fenestrae similar to Pepesuchus and Rukwasuchus. The parietal is solely responsible for forming the posteromedial edge of the skull table while the supraoccipital is not visible on the surface of the element.

Following Fachini and colleagues the postorbital bar, formed by the descending process of the postorbital and the ascending process of the jugal, is long and slender, separating the eyesocket from the infratemporal fenestra. They note that the upper part of the bar is directed lateroventrally (downward but also somewhat flaring outward), but eventually transitions rather abruptly into a more outwards orientation towards the contact between the postorbital and jugal contributions of the structure. Overall the shape of postorbital bar of Barreirosuchus contributes to the depth of the skull, distancing the skull roof from the jugal. Aside from its contribution to the postorbital bar the jugal can be separated into an anterior and a posterior region. The former, which precedes the infratemporal fenestra, is described as expanded and robust, whereas the jugal bar is more cylindrical and narrower. Notably, the jugal bears a subtle concavity in its ventral surface that separates the two regions from each other when the skull is viewed from the side. The jugal is immediately followed by the long and narrow quadratojugal, which forms the posterior edge of the infratemporal fenestra, baring the quadrate from participating in the structure, and part of the margin for the external auditory meatus. The infratemporal fenestra itself is large, occupying most of the space below the small external auditory meatus and separating it from the postorbital bar. The bony otic aperture is likewise small, with Fachini and colleagues noting that its even smaller than the supratemporal fenestrae. The quadrate is noted for its significant posterior development, extending beyond the occipital condyle. Towards the skull table the quadrate also comes into contact with the descending process of the squamosal along a long, straight and backwards directed suture towards the edge of the occipital surface.

The quadrate is furthermore responsible for forming the point of articulation for the lower jaw, which projects outward and down from the bones main body beyond even the occipital surface. Here the quadrate bears two slender hemicondyles, one lateral and one medial with the surface of the articular facet half the length of the skull table.

The basicranium is oriented almost vertically and only really visible from the back. At the very top of the occipital surface sits the supraoccipital, which is prevented from appearing on the dorsal surface by the fact that its contact with the parietal sits at the junction between the dorsal and occipital surface. Therefore, the bone is only visible from behind just like in animals like Rukwasuchus and Stolokrosuchus. Overall, the bone is butterfly-shaped and wider than long, stretching across 65% of the width of the skull table. At the contact with the parietal the supraoccipital participates in forming the posttemporal fenestra. The supraoccipital is known to further contact both the occipital exposure of the squamosals and the otoccipitals, though its ventral-most contacts are unclear. It bears a short median crest that is flanked on either side by depressions that are deeper than those seen in Rukwasuchus and Hamdasuchus. The occipitally exposed parts of the squamosals are described as strongly concave and roofed by the overlying parts of the squamosals on the skull roof. The long contact between squamosal and quadrate at the side of the skull helps distinguish Barreirosuchus from Rukwasuchus, as this subsequently creates a long exposure along the outer edge of the occipital surface in contrast with the latter taxon's much shorter contact.

The exoccipitals or otoccipitals forms the lateral edges of the foramen magnum, the top of the occipital condyle and the paraoccipital processes. Compared to Rukwasuchus and several other peirosaurians the dorsal sections of the otoccipitals, which meet each other along the midline, are much less robust. Each paraoccipital process is likewise characterized as long and slender and ends far backward near the respective hemicondyle of the quadrate. Compared to related forms the paraocciptal processes of Barreirosuchus are bent further back and lack a rugose surface. The upper and lower parts of the otoccipital are separated by a pronounced step in the bone and also differentiated by their differing textures, with the part above the step being described as smooth while the ventral section is covered by striations. The ventral margin, near the contact to the parabasisphenoid and basioccipital, bears a long depression similar to Stolokrosuchus and less sharply defined than that of Rukwasuchus. The surface of the ventral otoccipital is perforated by a variety of openings for nerves such as the hypoglossal, vagus and glossopharyngeal nerves as well as the cranioquadrate passage.

The basioccipital is hexagonal and overall wider than tall. It forms the lower part of the occipital condyle, ventral to which it bears a depression around an emissary foramen and the eustachian foramen at the contact with the basisphenoid. The emissary foramen is accompanied by a pair of scars, one on either side, which begin dorsally as flaps and become more crest-like ventrally, possibly extending downward to join a third medially-placed crest. The basioccipital is also pierced by a pair of teardrop-shaped pharyngotympanic tubes (lateral eustachian foramina), which compared to the median eustachian foramen are placed further up and not overlain by the basioccipital tubera, making the anatomy more similar to Montealtosuchus, dyrosaurids and modern crocodilians. The tubera are located at the outer and lower corners of the basioccipital plate, rugose and end in a crest-like structure. Overall, they are much better developed than in several other notosuchians, though not quite as prominent as in dyrosaurids and Aegisuchus. The parabasisphenoid then forms the floor of the braincase, though little of it is visible on the surface as its mostly overlapped by other bones like the pterygoids. From the side it is visible between the pterygoid process of the quadrate in front of it and the basioccipital behind it, bearing two grooves similar to Stolokrosuchus. The only other exposed part of the parabasisphenoid is the elongated parabasisphenoid rostrum or cultrifrom process, which can be seen through the opening of the median pharyngeal tube. Even less is known of the laterosphenoid other than that they formed the anterolateral walls of the braincase, appearing within the supratemporal fenestrae and bearing a rough cotylar crest at the contact with the frontal bone.

Ventrally the maxilla forms a palatal process that contacts the palatines medially and forms the front and part of the outer margin of the teardrop-shaped suborbital fenestra. The toothrow extends along the fenestra as in Amargasuchus, but ends shortly before the maxilla contacts the ectopterygoid bone, which extends backwards and forms the rest of the outer edge of the suborbital fenestra. While the front of the palatines is not preserved in the holotype of Barreirosuchus, the middle and posterior sections, which are partially located between the suborbital fenestrae, have been described as relatively broad. Towards the back the palatines form the anterior edge of the choana, from which point they project slightly outward to contact the pterygoids. The pterygoids form the posterior edge of the choana and join the ectopterygoids in forming the ventrally directed pterygoid wings. Between the flanges the pterygoid bears a semicircular recess located just before the eustachian foramen where the pterygoid contacts both the wedge-shaped basisphenoid and basioccipital.

The exact tooth count is not known, but Iori and Garcia suggest that the holotype preserves about a third of the series. The alveoli are well separated from another and shallow, reflecting that the posterior teeth had short roots. A few teeth are also preserved, though most are damaged. Those that were preserved are described as blunt and rounded with an oval cross-section. They are also noted to be low-crowned and following Fachini and colleagues taller than wide. Iori and Garcia furthermore describe them as being subtly labiolingually flattened and bearing striations along close to the base and at least one shows signs of a keel, but no serrations.

=== Endocast and other internal structures ===
The endocast of Barreirosuchus is despite the excellent preservation of the skull table only partially known, as parts of the braincase have been damaged. This leaves the anatomy of several nerve passages including the olfactory and optic nerves, the anterior pituitary gland and the vestibular system of the inner ear unknown. The overall shape closely resembles modern gharials and freshwater crocodiles, with the two hemispheres of the brain broad and tapering both towards the back and the front, where they transition into an elongated and narrow olfactory tract that eventually culminates in a well developed and downturned olfactory bulb resembling that of Rukwasuchus. What differentiates Bareirosuchus and Rukwasuchus is the fact that the olfactory tract of the former extends straight forward, while in the latter and Hamadasuchus there is also a downward aspect to the tracts orientation. The olfactory tract has also been noted for featuring a groove on either side, given the dorsal surface a vaulted appearance. Towards the front these grooves are circumscrabed by what Facchini and colleagues describe as a blade while a subtriangular notch clearly separates the already narrowing tract from the forebrain.

The olfactory bulb lies adjacent to the nasal cavity, which consists of the nasopharyngeal duct and the nasal cavity proper. The cavity is described is noted to be broader than tall and oval in shape, neither as flattened as in modern alligators nor high as in Campinasuchus and the olfactory region is located towards the back close towards the olfactory bulb. Less is known about the nasopharyngeal duct, with the reconstruction limited to a small part of the vomers and the pterygoid sinus. The former indicates a flattened and laterally expanded structure while the latter, together with a part of the duct created by the prefrontal pillars form an oval shape. Overall the nasopharyngeal duct is said to be sub-horizontally aligned and the pterygoid sinus resembles modern crocodiles while differing from some other eusuchians.

Though broad, the cerebrum is not as expanded as in the fellow peirosaurians Rukwasuchus and Hamadasuchus nor the baurusuchid Campinasuchus. The separation between the different regions of the brain; the fore-, mid- and hindbrain; can be observed through the various angles in the endocast referred to as cephalic flexion. More precisely the transition between fore- and midbrain sits at a 170° angle, while the transition from mid- to hindbrain exhibits an angle of around 120°. The forebrain has a convex upper surface with a marked ridge stretching across its width. The midbrain broadly resembles the forebrain, but tapers towards its back and shifts the whole endocast into a more vertical orientation due to being much more ventrally expanded. This verticalisation continues until the end of the hindbrain and is noted as occurring gradually, which sets Barreirosuchus apart from animals like Hamadasuchus in which this shift is a lot more sudden and characterized by sharp angles.

The skull of Barreirosuchus shows well developed cranial pneumaticity thanks to an expanded system of paratympanic sinuses. The system has been noted as being ramified and laterally expanded as in modern semi-aquatic crocodilians rather than the dorsoventrally expanded system seen in terrestrial animals such as Zulmasuchus, although Fachini and colleagues note that some taxa like Hamadasuchus and Campinasuchus likewise resemble the former condition. Like with parts of the nasal cavity and endocast, certain aspects of the paratympanic system are obscured by damage to the holotype skull of Barreirosuchus. The ramification of the pharyngotympanic system for instance reaches into both the inner ear and the pharynx in modern crocodiles, but in Barreirosuchus only its projection into the external auditory meatus is visible and well-developed, with Fachini and colleagues describing the projection as deeper than wide and extending towards the hindbrain. The intertympanic diverticula and the median pharyngeal sinus system are also preserved, the former having been described as splitting into two anterior processes and the latter being positioned below the pharyngotympanic system.

=== Vertebrae ===
The holotype specimen of Barreirosuchus includes four vertebrae, specifically the last two dorsal/lumbar vertebrae and the first two sacral vertebrae. The lumbars are described as slightly amphicoelous (concave at both ends), wider than long with bodies that are approximately as tall as they are wide. The penultimate lumbar vertebrae has flattened sides, making it appear almost rectangular when viewed from below, while the final lumbar expands towards its contact with the following sacral vertebra. The neural spines of the lumbars are described as anteroposteriorly long but slender and make up approximately half the total height of the vertebra. Each vertebra features two depressions on its sides, one located above the opening of the vertebral canal and another before the post-zygapophyseal process.

Like the lumbars, the sacrals are slightly amphicoelous. The first sacral vertebra mirrors the last lumbar in having a slightly expanded anterior region and is similarly as wide as tall. It does however differ in the position of the post-zygapophyseal processes, which appear to have been positioned less laterally than in the lumbar vertebrae. The second preserved lumbar has slightly different proportions, with the body starting off as equally tall as wide but becoming wider posteriorly. Both the pre- and post-zygapophyseal processes are positioned closer to the neural spine, and the sacral wings were directed backwards, extending beyond the body of the vertebra.

Although the holotype specimen is incomplete, the complete skull of Barreirosuchus is estimated to have been about 50 centimetres (20 in) long. The entire body may have been around 4 metres (13 ft). Some of the sutures between bones in the skull are fused, indicating that MPMA-04-0012/00 was an adult when it died.

== Paleoenvironment ==
Barreirosuchus is thought to have been semiaquatic, much like modern crocodilians. Unlike the deep-skulled terrestrial crocodyliforms that lived alongside it, Barreirosuchus had a dorsoventrally flattened skull. Its eyes were angled upward and were positioned higher than most of the skull, allowing the animal to keep its eyes above the surface of the water if it were in a lake or river. The holotype specimen of Barreirosuchus was also found close to a turtle rib and an isolated crocodyliform tooth, evidence that its remains were preserved in an aquatic habitat. Remains of terrestrial crocodyliforms are abundant and well-preserved in the Bauru Basin, while fossils of aquatic and semiaquatic organisms are rarer and often disarticulated. Before the discovery of Barreirosuchus, the only known semiaquatic crocodyliforms from the Bauru Basin were Itasuchus jesuinoi and Roxochampsa paulistanus, and both were known only from isolated bones. Iori and Garcia proposed that terrestrial crocodyliforms were better preserved because they were better suited to drought conditions, possibly borrowing when rainfall was low. If they died in burrows, their skeletons were more likely to be preserved intact. A semiaquatic animal like Barreirosuchus, in contrast, would die in an exposed location if the body of water it lived in dried up. Scavengers may then have disturbed the remains and scattered the bones.
