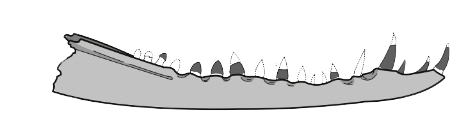
- Left hemimandible of P. deisae, specimen MCT 1788-R

Scientific classification
- Kingdom: Animalia
- Phylum: Chordata
- Class: Reptilia
- Clade: Pseudosuchia
- Clade: Crocodylomorpha
- Clade: †Notosuchia
- Family: †Itasuchidae
- Genus: †Pepesuchus; Campos et al., 2011
- Species: †P. deiseae

Binomial name
- †Pepesuchus deiseae Campos et al., 2011

= Pepesuchus =

Pepesuchus Temporal range: Campanian-Maastrichtian ~84.9–66.0 Ma

Extinct genus of reptiles

Pepesuchus is an extinct genus of carnivorous metasuchian from the Late Cretaceous period. It is a peirosaurid which lived during the Campanian and Maastrichtian stages of the Late Cretaceous in what is now state of São Paulo, Brazil. It was a semiaquatic crocodylomorph.

== Etymology ==
Pepesuchus was named by Diogenes A. Campos, Gustavo R. Oliveira, Rodrigo G. Figueiredo, Douglas Riff, Sergio A.K. Azevedo, Luciana B. Carvalho and Alexander W.A. Kellner in 2011 and the type species is Pepesuchus deiseae. The generic name honours Professor José Martin Suárez (known by his colleagues as "Pepe"), and "suchus", from Greek meaning crocodile. The specific name honours the paleontologist Deise Dias Rêgo Henriques.

== Description ==
Pepesuchus is known from the holotype MN 7005-V, which consists of nearly complete skeleton and skull, and from the paratype MCT 1788-R, a nearly complete skull and lower jaw likely from the same locality of the holotype. The specimens were recovered from the Presidente Prudente Formation of the Bauru Group of the northern Paraná Basin, between the cities of Pirapozinho and Presidente Prudente. In 2019, new fossil material from the Adamantina Formation was described.

The skull of Pepesuchus is roughly triangular when viewed from above and is covered in small pits. The jaws are lined with many small pointed teeth. Like other sebecians, Pepesuchus has ziphodont teeth that are laterally compressed and serrated. A total of 17 teeth are present in each maxilla, the most of any sebecian after Stolokrosuchus. There are also numerous dentary teeth in the lower jaw, with the foremost ones directed in a slight forward position. The snout of Pepesuchus is somewhat wider than those of other peirosaurids and has a slight upward curve.

== Classification ==
Pepesuchus is united with the peirosaurids Peirosaurus, Lomasuchus, and Uberabasuchus on the basis of several shared characteristics. Among these features are five premaxillary teeth with the first two positioned close together and the oval-shaped cross-section of the jugal bone that makes up the lower temporal bar underneath the eye sockets. Pepesuchus also has a ridge on the maxillary shelf of the palate, a feature it shares with all members of the larger clade Sebecia (which includes peirosaurids and the related family Sebecidae).
