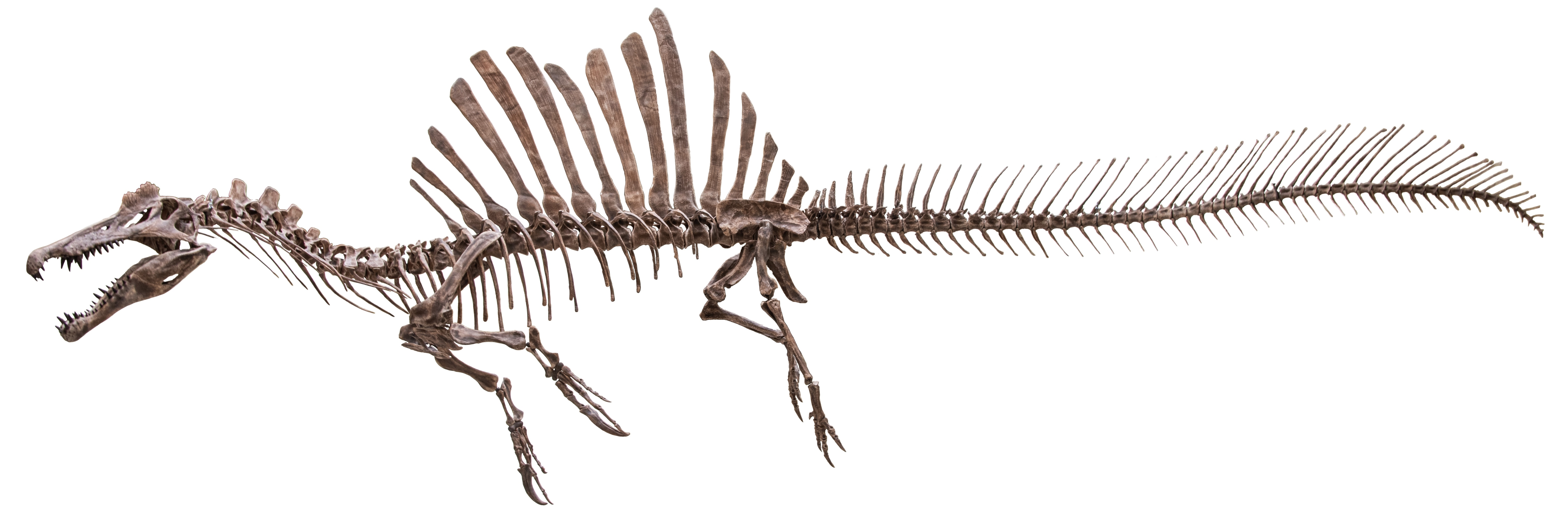
- Reconstructed skeleton in swimming posture based on specimen FSAC-KK-11888, Field Museum of Natural History

Scientific classification
- Kingdom: Animalia
- Phylum: Chordata
- Class: Reptilia
- Clade: Dinosauria
- Clade: Saurischia
- Clade: Theropoda
- Family: †Spinosauridae
- Subfamily: †Spinosaurinae
- Tribe: †Spinosaurini
- Genus: †Spinosaurus; Stromer, 1915

Type species
- †Spinosaurus aegyptiacus Stromer, 1915

Other species
- †S. maroccanus? Russell, 1996; †S. mirabilis Sereno et al., 2026

Synonyms
- †Sigilmassasaurus brevicollis? Russell, 1996; †Oxalaia quilombensis? Kellner et al., 2011

= Spinosaurus =

Spinosaurus Temporal range: Late Cretaceous, Cenomanian (possible Albian records)

Genus of spinosaurid dinosaur

Spinosaurus (/ˌspaɪnəˈsɔːrəs/; lit. 'spine lizard') is a genus of large spinosaurid theropod dinosaurs that lived in what is now North Africa during the Cenomanian age of the Late Cretaceous period, about 100 to 94 million years ago. The genus was known first from Egyptian remains discovered in 1912 and described by German palaeontologist Ernst Stromer in 1915. The original remains were destroyed in World War II, but additional material came to light in the early 21st century. It is unclear whether one or two species are represented in the fossils reported in the scientific literature. The type species, S. aegyptiacus, is mainly known from the Bahariya Formation in Egypt and the Kem Kem beds in Morocco. The other species, S. mirabilis, is known from the Farak Formation in Niger. Possible junior synonyms include Sigilmassasaurus and the dubious S. maroccanus from the Kem Kem beds and Oxalaia from the Alcântara Formation in Brazil, though the distinction and validity of these taxa have been debated.

Spinosaurus is among the largest known terrestrial carnivores; other large carnivores comparable to Spinosaurus include theropods such as Tyrannosaurus, Giganotosaurus and the contemporary Carcharodontosaurus. A 2022 study suggests that S. aegyptiacus could have reached 14 m (46 ft) in length and 7.4 t (8.2 short tons) in body mass. The skull of Spinosaurus was long, low, and narrow, similar to that of a modern crocodilian, and bore straight conical teeth with few to no serrations. It would have had large, robust forelimbs bearing three-fingered hands, with an enlarged claw on the first digit. The distinctive neural spines of Spinosaurus, which were long extensions of the vertebrae, grew to at least 1.65 m (5.4 ft) long and were likely to have had skin connecting them, forming a sail-like structure. The hip bones of Spinosaurus were reduced, and the legs were very short in proportion to the body. Its long and narrow tail was deepened by tall, thin neural spines and elongated chevrons, forming a paddle-like structure.

Spinosaurus is known to have eaten both aquatic and terrestrial prey. Evidence suggests that it was semiaquatic, although the extent of its swimming capability has been strongly contested. Spinosaurus's leg bones had a high bone density, allowing for better buoyancy control. Multiple functions have been put forward for the dorsal sail, including thermoregulation and display (to intimidate rivals and/or attract mates). It lived in a humid environment of tidal flats and mangrove forests alongside many other dinosaurs as well as fish, crocodylomorphs, squamates, turtles, pterosaurs, and plesiosaurs.

== Discovery and naming ==
=== Initial finds ===
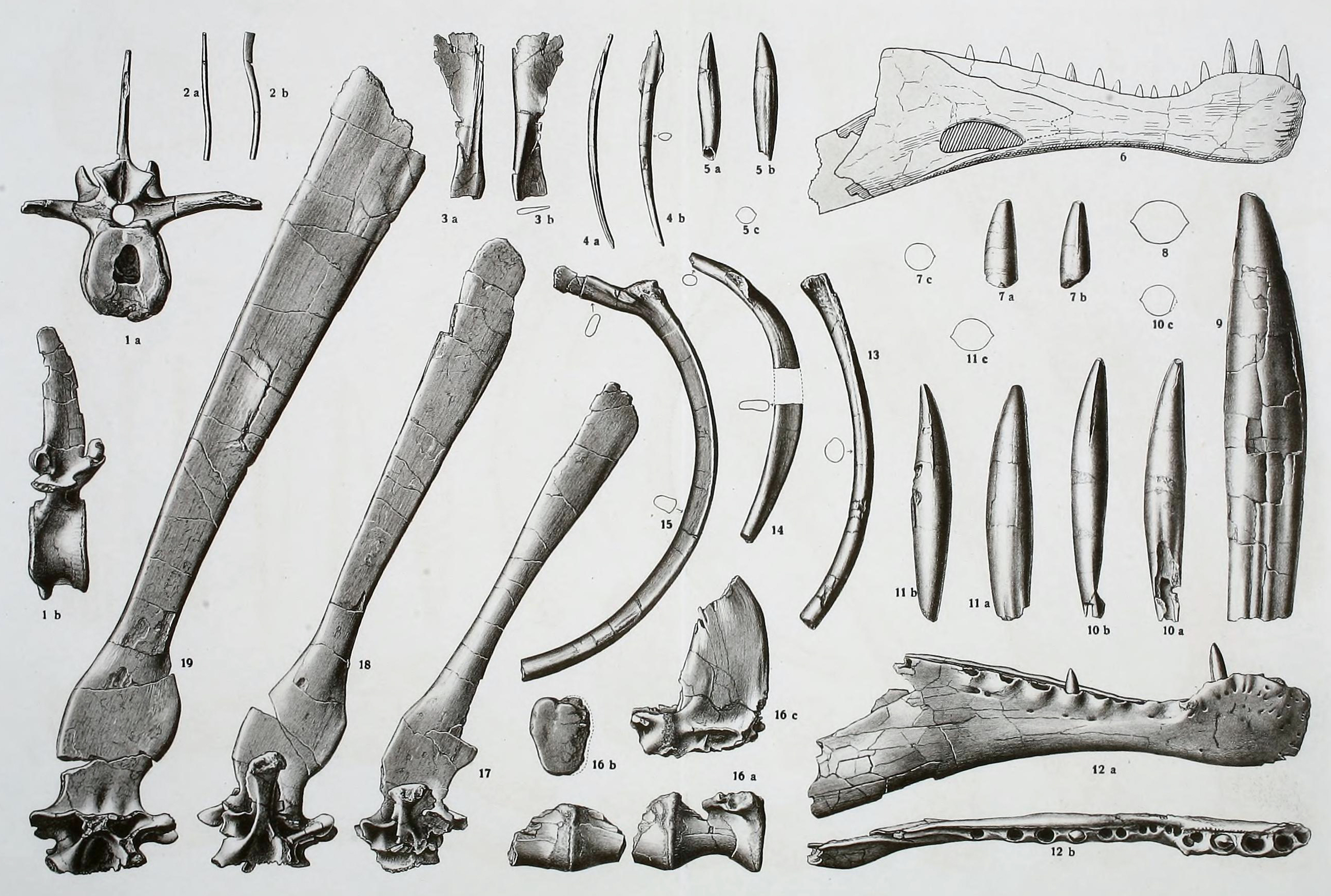
Plate I of elements of the S. aegyptiacus holotype (name-bearing) specimen from Stromer (1915)

The first discovery of Spinosaurus may have been in October 1898, when French geologist Fernand Foureau unearthed two unusual teeth in Cenomanian-aged sediments of the Djoua Escarpment in what is now southern Algeria, then French Algeria. Foreau found the specimens while on the Foureau-Lamy Expedition of 1898-1900, which traveled across the Sahara from Algeria to Lake Chad. In 1905, French geologist Emile Haug described the fossils unearthed while on the expedition, including the two teeth which he assigned to the fish Saurocephalus. However, in 1915 German paleontologist and describer of Spinosaurus Ernst Stromer reassigned the teeth to Spinosaurus. Later studies have agreed with this assessment, however the teeth themselves has since been lost.

The first confidently referable remains of Spinosaurus were discovered in the autumn of 1912 by Austro-Hungarian paleontologist Richard Markgraf, a fossil collector who was financed by Stromer and the Bavarian Academy of Sciences, in deposits of the Bahariya Formation in the Bahariya Oasis of western Egypt. The sediments of the Bahariya Formation come from the Cenomanian stage of the Late Cretaceous period, one of many Cretaceous-aged formations of North Africa. In 1915, Stromer described these remains as belonging to a new genus and species of dinosaur, Spinosaurus aegyptiacus. The generic name Spinosaurus comes from the Latin spina, meaning "spine", and the Greek sauros, meaning "lizard", and thus "spine lizard". The specific name aegyptiacus derives from Egypt, where the fossils were unearthed. Spinosaurus aegyptiacus' type specimen (BSP 1912 VIII 19) consists of elements of the mandible (lower jaw), a maxilla (upper jaw) fragment, cervical (neck), caudal (tail), and dorsal (back) vertebrae, including much of the neural spines, ribs, teeth, and some gastralia (belly ribs).

In April 1914, another expedition to the Bahariya Oasis by Markgraf unearthed an incomplete skeleton (BSP 1922 X45) of a spinosaurid. This skeleton was poorly preserved and, as a result of illegal unpacking and insufficient repacking by Anglo-Egyptians during World War I, was greatly damaged. After much deliberation due to the war and poor Anglo-German relations, the skeleton arrived in Germany in 1922 where it was described by Stromer in 1934. Stromer assigned the skeleton to Spinosaurus, but considered it different enough from S. aegyptiacus that it would belong to its own Spinosaurus species, "Spinosaurus B".

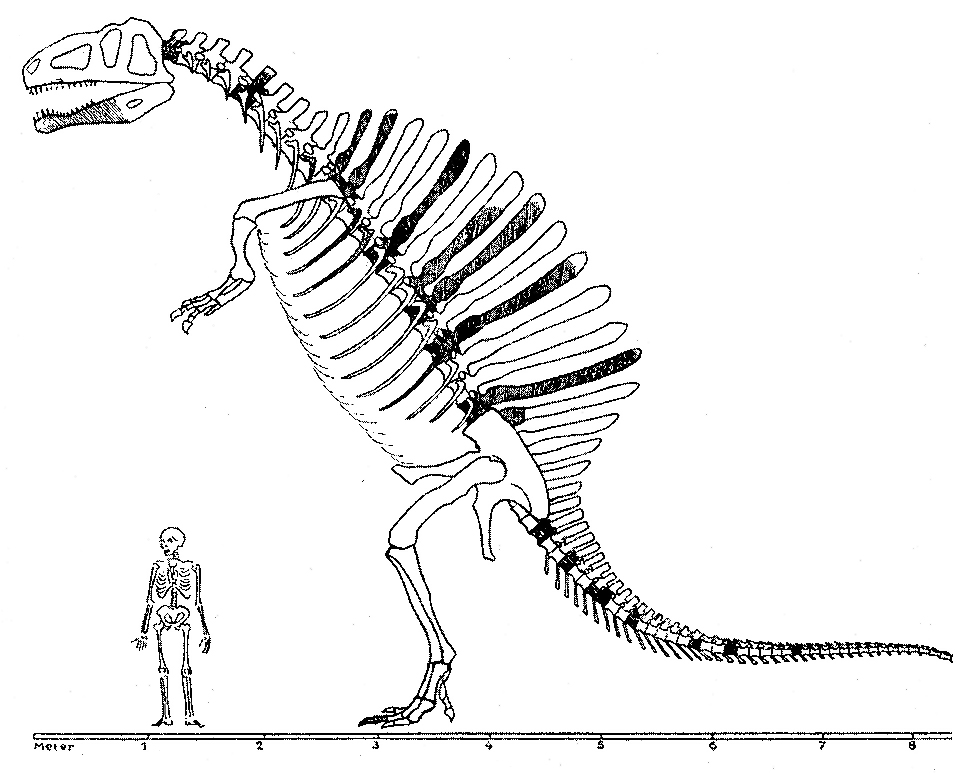
Erhardt's 1936 skeletal reconstruction of S. aegyptiacus, with shaded areas being known parts of the holotype

In 1936, Stromer worked with Dr. Erhardt (the first name is unknown) to create a skeletal reconstruction of Spinosaurus based on fossils of the holotype, "Spinosaurus B", and related taxa. Although Stromer was hesistant about the lack of known remains, he and Erhardt produced a restoration that filled in missing elements of Spinosaurus' skeleton with the tyrannosaurid theropods Tyrannosaurus and Gorgosaurus. Unfortunately, during the night of April 24/25, 1944, the building of the Paläontologisches Museum München (Bavarian State Collection of Paleontology) of the Bavarian Academy of Sciences was severely damaged during the British Bombing of Munich. Due to personal and political tensions between Stromer and the museum's director Karl Beurlen, who was a fervent Nazi, the Spinosaurus fossils held there were not rehoused and subsequently destroyed as a result of the bombing. Stromer's finds, including Spinosaurus, received little academic or public attention. In 1995, Stromer's son donated his father's archives to the Paläontologische Staatssammlung München, leading to a 2006 study by American researcher Joshua Smith and colleagues of the photographs, two of which were of Spinosaurus' holotype. Based on these photographs of the mandible and the entire specimen as mounted, Smith concluded that Stromer's original 1915 drawings were slightly inaccurate. No more spinosaurid material would be described from Africa until the latter half of the 20th century, with Spinosaurus remaining an enigmatic and mysterious theropod.

=== Additional finds ===
Beginning in the 1980s, Spinosaurus material began being described from sites in Algeria, Morocco, and Tunisia, although these fossils were often isolated and fragmentary. In 1986, a paper referred several teeth found in Cretaceous deposits in Tunisia to Spinosaurus, being the first evidence of the taxon's existence in the country. In 1989, French paleontologist Eric Buffetaut assigned two jaw fragments and a tooth that had been unearthed in a deposit of the Kem Kem Beds in Taouz, Morocco to Spinosaurus sp., expanding the known distribution of the genus to Morocco. In the 1990s, a wealth of spinosaurid remains were described from South America, Asia, Africa, and Europe, strengthening the understanding of Spinosaurus and Spinosauridae. However, much of the anatomy of Spinosaurus still remained obscure and many studies proposed that fossils previously assigned to the genus or Sigilmassasaurus were actually from iguanodont ornithischians, megaraptorans, carcharodontosaurids, or other forms of theropod.

Additional fossils of Spinosaurus were recovered from the Kem Kem Beds in the Tafilalt Oasis of Morocco, near the site of the ancient city of Sigilmassa. In 1996, Canadian paleontologist Dale Russell described these fossils, consisting of three cervical vertebrae, two mandible fragments, and the neural spine of a dorsal vertebra, as belonging to a new species of Spinosaurus, S. maroccanus. The specific name, maroccanus, derives from royaume du Maroc ("Kingdom of Morocco"), where the fossils were unearthed. The site where S. maroccanus' fossils were found is located in the south of the country and made up of red sandstone, known by various names, including the Grès rouges infracénomaniens, Continental Red Beds, and lower Kem Kem Beds. Of these fossils, one cervical vertebra (cataloged at the Canadian Museum of Nature as NMC 50791), was selected as the holotype of S. maroccanus.

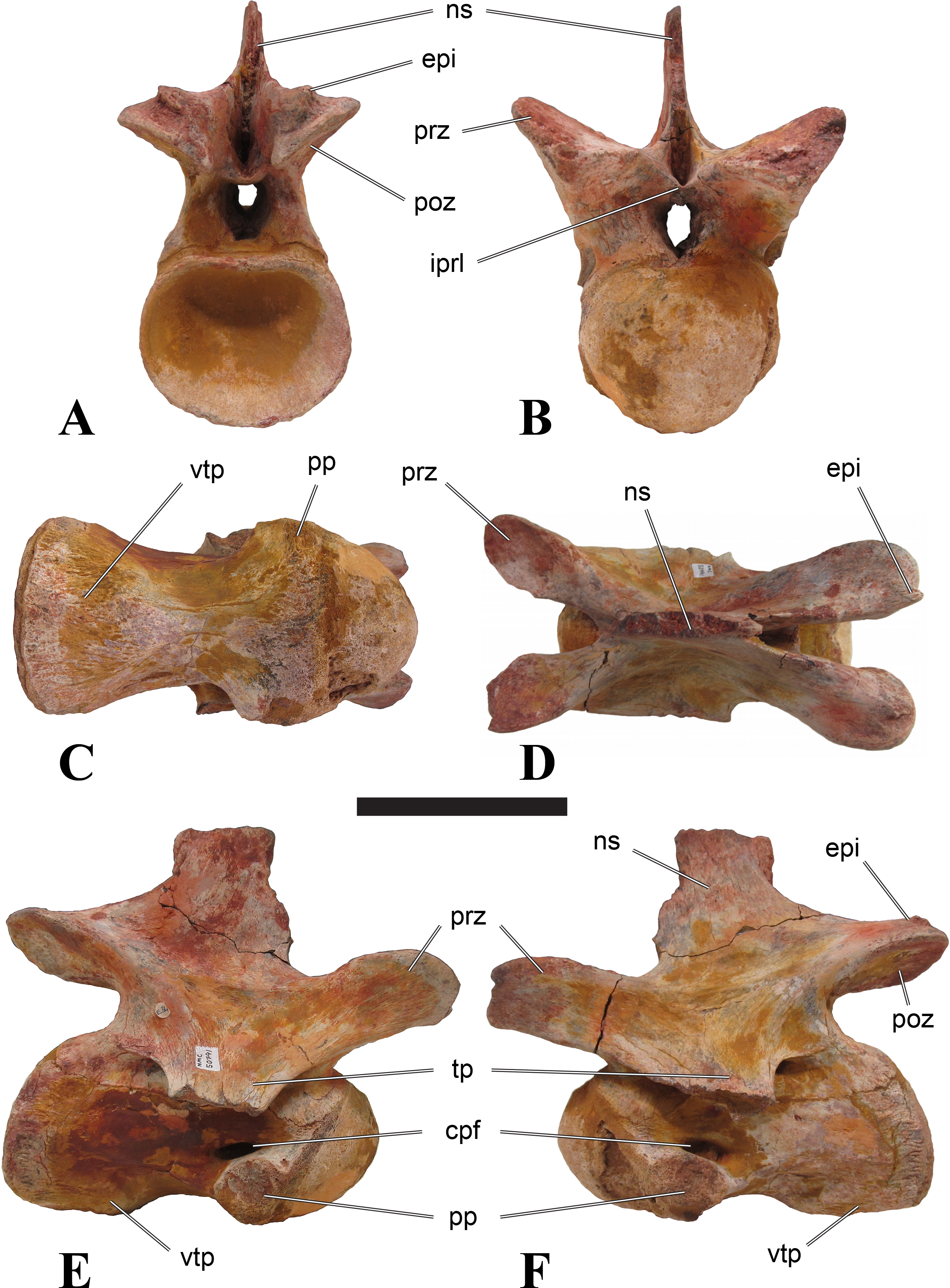
Holotype of S. maroccanus which was later reclassified as a vertabrae of the controversial Sigilmassasaurus

S. maroccanus was differentiated from S. aegyptiacus based on the length of its neck vertebrae. Specifically, Russell claimed that the ratio of the length of the centrum (body of vertebra) to the height of the posterior articular facet was 1.1 in S. aegyptiacus and 1.5 in S. maroccanus. Later authors have been split on this topic, with some authors noting that the length of the vertebrae can vary from individual to individual, that the holotype specimen was destroyed and thus cannot be compared directly with the S. maroccanus specimen, and that it is unknown which cervical vertebrae the S. maroccanus specimens represent. Therefore, though some have retained the species as valid without much comment, most researchers regard S. maroccanus as a nomen dubium (dubious name), a junior synonym of S. aegyptiacus, or a junior synonym of Sigilmassasaurus brevicollis. Some studies have referred to the holotype and other referred specimens of S. maroccanus (NMC 50791 and MNHN SAM 124–128) as S. cf. aegyptiacus. The specimens previously ascribed as paratypes of S. maroccanus (NMC 41768 and NMC 50790) were reidentified as spinosaurid specimens that are currently not identifiable at the generic level.

In 1996, a study by American paleontologist Paul Sereno and colleagues assigned cervical vertebrae referred to "Spinosaurus B" and the spinosaurid Sigilmassasaurus (a possible synonym of Spinosaurus) to the carcharodontosaurid Carcharodontosaurus. This was based on the erroneous belief that a cervical vertebra (SGM Din-3) found nearby a skull of Carcharodontosaurus (SGM Din-1) belonged to the same individual. Sereno and colleagues also reasoned that stout cervicals like those of Sigilmassasaurus would be needed to carry the skulls of carcharodontosaurids, however later analyses have proven that "Spinosaurus B" and Sigilmassasaurus are not synonyms or contain fossils from Carcharodontosaurus. Some studies have continued to refer "Spinosaurus B" to Sigilmassasaurus, although this is still debated. In 2003, Oliver Rauhut suggested that Stromer's Spinosaurus holotype (name-bearing) specimen was a chimera, composed of vertebrae and neural spines from a carcharodontosaurid similar to Acrocanthosaurus and a mandible from Baryonyx or Suchomimus, an analysis that was rejected in at least one subsequent paper.

=== Proposed neotype ===
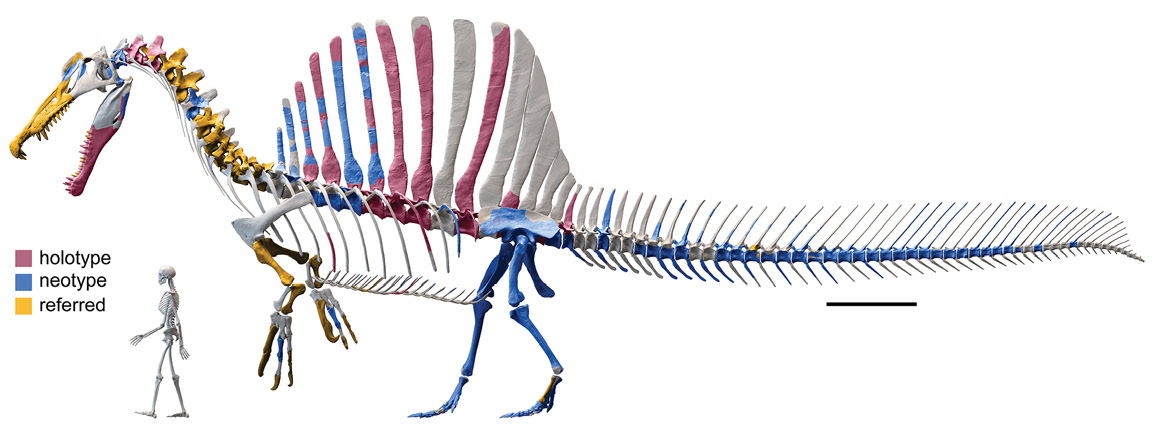
Digital skeletal reconstruction of Spinosaurus, showing known bones based on the holotype (red), proposed neotype (blue), and referred specimens (yellow), according to Sereno et al. (2022)

In 2008, a Moroccan fossil collector based in Erfoud presented a few fragmentary dinosaur fossils to Italian paleontologist Nizar Ibrahim, who suspected they may belong to Spinosaurus. The next year, several other fossils, constituting a partial skeleton, were acquired by the Museo di Storia Naturale di Milano (MSNM) from an Italian fossil dealer who had purchased them from the same who showed the remains to Ibrahim the previous year. Later, Ibrahim visited the MSNM and was presented the material by Italian paleontologists Cristiano Dal Sasso and Simone Maganuco. Ibrahim recognized that the MSNM fossils and the ones he had seen in 2008 were from a similar sandstone matrix and that the neural spines of the MSNM fossils were similar to those depicted by Stromer in 1915, leading him to think that they may be from the same individual and belonged to Spinosaurus.

Following this, an international collaboration began between Ibrahim and other paleontologists to study the bones and visit the original site, with fossils from the MSNM getting sent to the University of Chicago for study. In 2013, Ibrahim, Moroccan paleontologist Samir Zouhri, and British paleontologist David Martill ventured to Casablanca in search of the original fossil dealer, who they were able to track down. Subsequently, the dealer took them back to the site where the fossils had been found. Over the course of several years, a skeleton of a subadult individual consisting of skull fragments, some cervical, dorsal, and caudal vertebrae, neural spines, a complete sacrum, much of the hindlimbs, several pedal phalanges, and several dorsal ribs was unearthed. This skeleton comes from a locality of the Douria Formation of the Kem Kem Beds in Zrigat, Morocco, dated to the Cenomanian stage of the mid-Cretaceous period. It was deposited at the Casablanca Museum under specimen number FSAC-KK-11888.

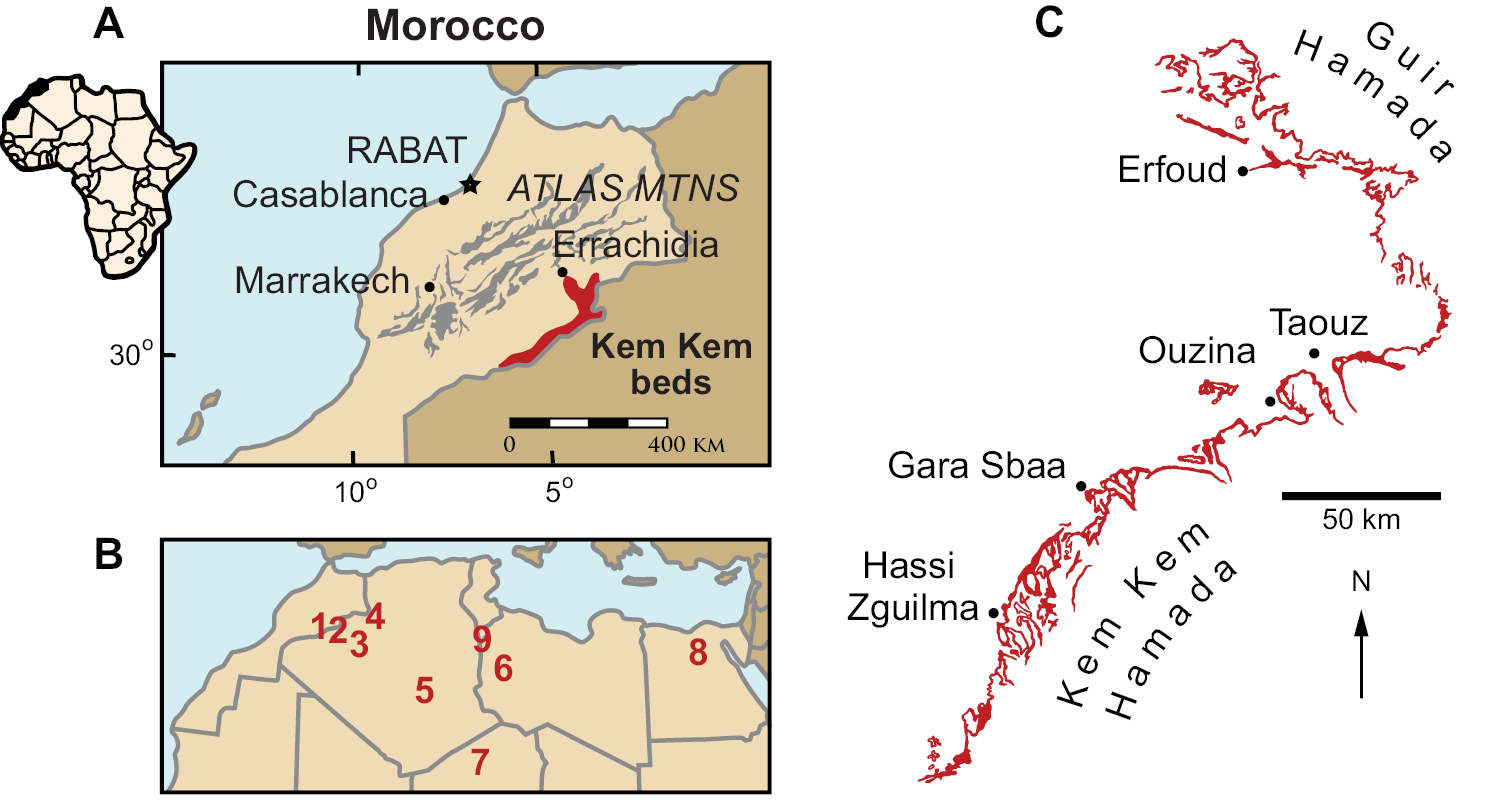
Geographical setting of the Kem Kem region and outcrops, with Kem Kem and Guir Hamadas outcrops in red.

In 2014, Ibrahim and colleagues assigned the fossils to S. aegyptiacus, proposed it the neotype (replacement holotype), and stated that all North African Cenomanian spinosaurid material belongs to S. aegyptiacus. The description of these remains were met with intrigue, surprise, and controversy, as the authors claimed that Spinosaurus was a possibly quadrupedal, semiaquatic, short-limbed spinosaurid. The body proportions of the specimen have been debated, as the hind limbs are disproportionately shorter in the specimen than in previous reconstructions. However, it has been demonstrated by multiple paleontologists that the specimen is not a chimera, and is indeed a specimen of Spinosaurus that suggests that the animal had much smaller hind limbs than previously thought.

In 2015, British paleontologist Serjoscha Evers and colleagues rejected the neotype proposal for FSAC-KK-11888 on the basis of the lack of association or locality information for FSAC-KK-11888, the geographical separation between the holotype and FSAC-KK-11888 localities, and anatomical differences between FSAC-KK-11888 and the holotype. Evers and colleagues argue for the validity of both S. marrocanus and S. aegyptiacus, stating that FSAC-KK-11888 likely belongs to the former. Additionally, they state that the geographical separation of FSAC-KK-11888 and the holotype as well as the detailed description of the holotype by Stromer are evidence that FSAC-KK-11888 does not meet the ICZN (International Code of Zoological Nomenclature)'s requirements for a neotype and that the creation of a neotype is unnecessary for S. aegyptiacus. Additionally, some paleontologists have suggested that the proportions of the dorsal vertebrae compared to the legs of FSAC-KK-11888 when compared to the proportions of "Spinosaurus B" illustrate that either the former is a composite (a specimen composed of multiple individuals of the same species)/chimera (a specimen composed of material from two or more species) between an individual known from dorsal vertebrae and an individual known from limb, pelvic, and tail material or that FSAC-KK-11888 is not from Spinosaurus.

Between 2015 and 2019, several additional expeditions to the site unearthed additional fossils of FSAC-KK-11888 including many caudal vertebrae, composing about 80% of the tail with a preserved length of 4 m (13 ft), elements of the pes and hindlimbs, skull fragments, and more. Around 90% of this new material was found in late 2018, whereas some fragments including cranial material were found in debris of previous expeditions. In 2020, Ibrahim and colleagues described the tail of FSAC-KK-11888, which they stated closely compares to the caudal vertebrae of the holotype and "Spinosaurus B". The material found on these expeditions perfectly matches elements of the FSAC-KK-11888, proving that they come from a single individual. The body length of the proposed neotype excluding the tail portion, from the anterior tip of the skull to the posterior region of the pelvic girdle, is estimated up to 5.88 m (19.3 ft),^{Table S1} and the total length of the tail is estimated up to 5.3 m (17 ft).

== Description ==
=== Size ===
Size comparison of selected giant theropod dinosaurs, S. aegyptiacus in red

Since its discovery, Spinosaurus has been a contender for the largest theropod dinosaur. Both Friedrich von Huene in 1926 and Donald F. Glut in 1982 listed it as among the most massive theropods in their surveys, at 15 m (49 ft) in length and upwards of 6 t (6.6 short tons) in weight. In 1988, Gregory S. Paul also listed it as the longest theropod at 15 m (49 ft), but gave a lower mass estimate of 4 t (4.4 short tons).

Estimated size of the largest known, holotype, neotype, and smallest known specimen with a human

In 2005, Dal Sasso and colleagues assumed that Spinosaurus and the related Suchomimus had the same body proportions in relation to their skull lengths, and estimated that Spinosaurus was 16 to 18 m (52 to 59 ft) long and weighed 7 to 9 t (7.7 to 9.9 short tons). In their 2007 paper using scaling to extrapolate theropod body size based on skull length, François Therrien and Donald Henderson challenged previous estimates of the size of Spinosaurus. Based on estimated skull lengths of 1.5 to 1.75 m (4 ft 11 in to 5 ft 9 in), they estimated a body length of 12.6 to 14.3 m (41 to 47 ft) and a body mass of 12 to 20.9 t (13.2 to 23.0 short tons); they also suggested that contrary to Dal Sasso et al. (2005), their scaling based on a 11 m (36 ft) long Suchomimus would produce an estimated body mass of 11.7 to 16.7 t (12.9 to 18.4 short tons). The lower estimates for Spinosaurus would imply that the animal was shorter and lighter than Carcharodontosaurus and Giganotosaurus. In 2020, Nicolás Campione and David Evans suggested to take caution with the approach using skull length for extrapolation, namely that of Spinosaurus, since the preorbital region of some dinosaurs grow allometrically (disproportionately with body size) and the cranial properties were likely under different selection pressures unrelated to body size.

In 2014, Ibrahim and his colleagues suggested that an adult Spinosaurus aegyptiacus could reach over 15 m (49 ft) in length. In 2022, however, Paul Sereno and his colleagues suggested that Spinosaurus aegyptiacus reached a maximum body length of 14 m (46 ft) and a maximum body mass of 7.4 t (8.2 short tons) by constructing a CT-based 3D skeletal model "with the axial column in neutral pose." They argued that the 2D graphical reconstruction of the aquatic hypothesis by Ibrahim and his colleagues in 2020 overestimated the presacral column length by 10%, ribcage depth by 25%, and forelimb length by 30% over dimensions based on CT-scanned fossils; these proportional overestimates shift the center of mass anteriorly when translated to a flesh model, and thus the estimate from Ibrahim and his colleagues cannot be considered a reliable body size estimate.

=== Skull ===
Annotated diagram of the reconstructed skull of Spinosaurus

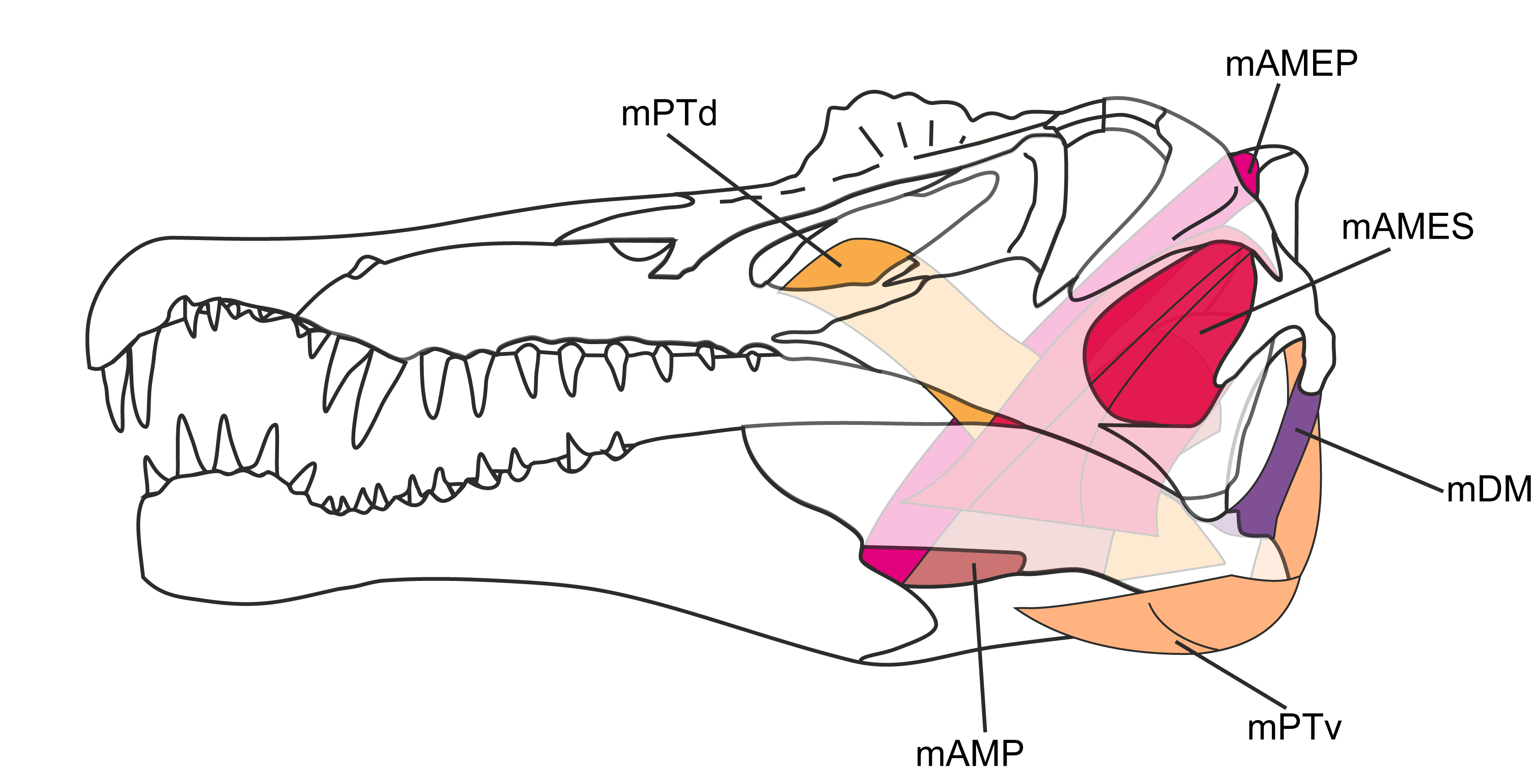
Annotated diagram of the reconstructed skull muscles of Spinosaurus

Its skull had a narrow snout filled with straight conical teeth that lacked serrations. There were six or seven teeth on each side of the very front of the upper jaw, in the premaxillae, and another twelve in both maxillae behind them. The second and third teeth on each side were noticeably larger than the rest of the teeth in the premaxilla, creating a space between them and the large teeth in the front of the maxilla; large teeth in the lower jaw faced this space. The very tip of the snout holding those few large front teeth was expanded, and a small crest was present in front of the eyes. Using the dimensions of three specimens known as MSNM V4047, UCPC-2, and BSP 1912 VIII 19, and assuming that the postorbital region of MSNM V4047 had a shape similar to the postorbital region of Irritator, Dal Sasso et al. (2005) estimated that the skull of an adult Spinosaurus was 1.75 meters (5.7 ft) long, but Hendrickx et al. (2016) suggested that a length of 1.6 meters (5.2 ft) is more likely. The estimated skull length of the subadult neotype is up to 1.12 meters (3.7 ft).^{Table S1} A 2026 study analyzed cranial material of two Spinosaurids, including two specimens referred to the controversial species S. maroccanus, their findings were interpreted as indicative of a highly developed, sensitive neurovascular system and a high tooth replacement rate in Spinosaurids from a young age.

=== Postcranial skeleton ===
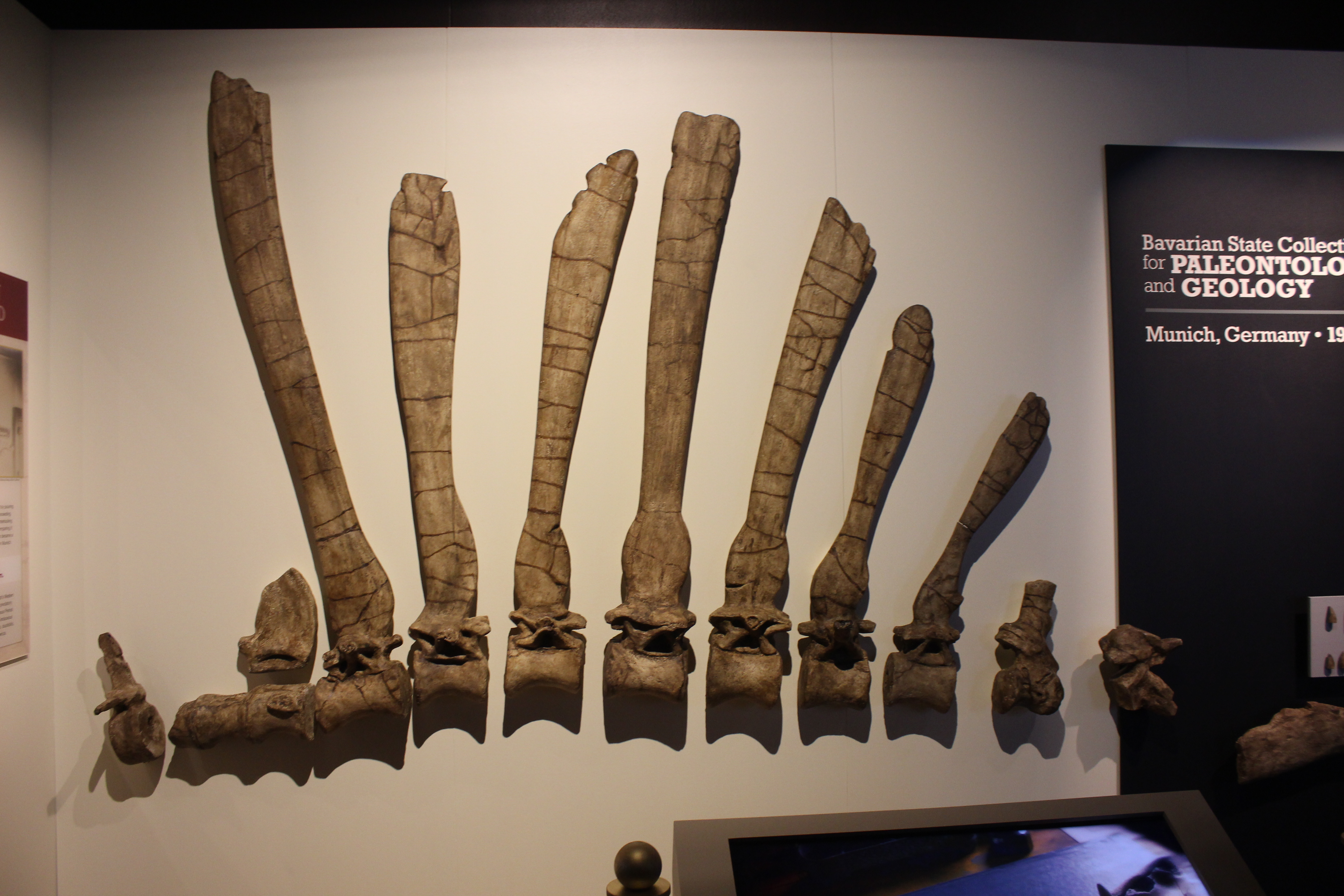
Reconstructed replicas of the holotype vertebrae, National Geographic Museum, Washington, D. C.

As a spinosaurid, Spinosaurus would have had a long, muscular neck, curved in a sigmoid, or S-shape. Its shoulders were prominent, and the forelimbs large and stocky, bearing three clawed digits on each hand. The first finger (or "thumb") would have been the largest. Spinosaurus had long phalanges (finger bones), and only somewhat recurved claws, suggesting that its hands were longer compared to those of other spinosaurids.

Very tall neural spines growing on the back vertebrae of Spinosaurus formed the basis of what is usually called the animal's "sail". The lengths of the neural spines reached over 10 times the diameters of the centra (vertebral bodies) from which they extended. The neural spines were slightly longer front to back at the base than higher up, and were unlike the thin rods seen in the pelycosaur finbacks such as Edaphosaurus, Ianthasaurus and Dimetrodon, contrasting also with the thicker spines in the iguanodontian Ouranosaurus.

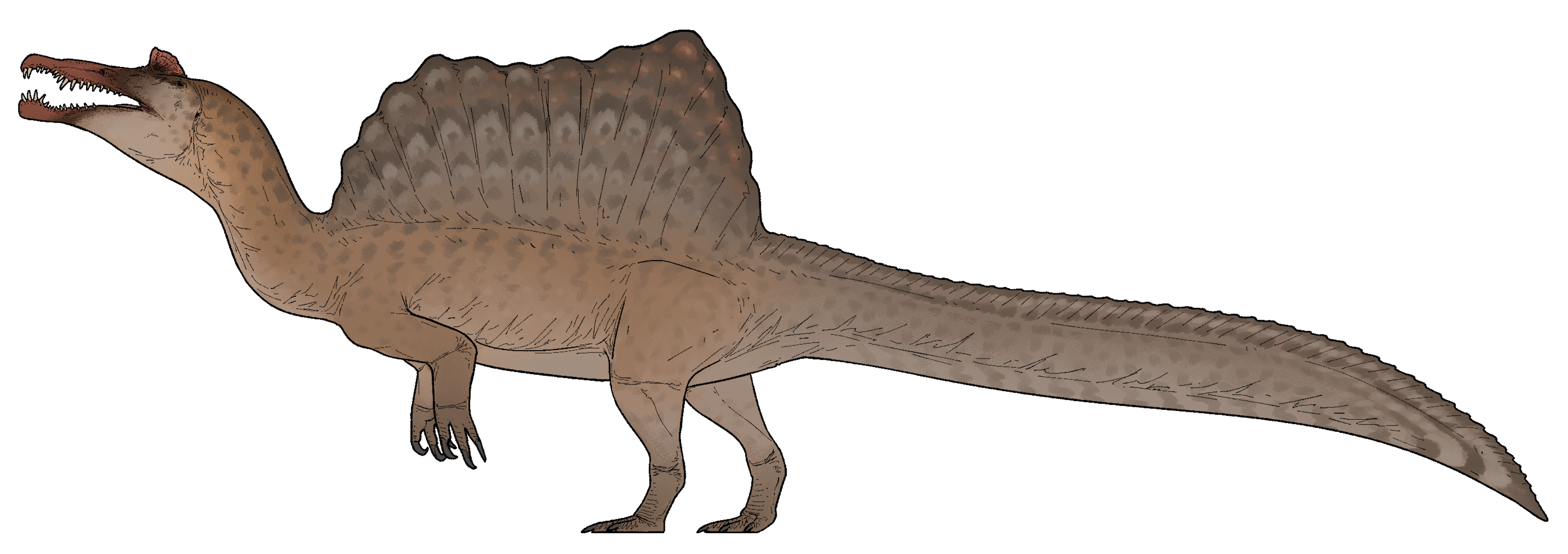
Life restoration

Spinosaurus sails were unusual, although other dinosaurs, namely Ouranosaurus, which lived a few million years earlier in the same general region as Spinosaurus, and the Early Cretaceous South American sauropod Amargasaurus, might have developed similar structural adaptations of their vertebrae. The sail may be an analog of the sail of the Permian synapsid Dimetrodon, which lived before the dinosaurs even appeared, produced by convergent evolution.

The structure may also have been more hump-like than sail-like, as noted by Stromer in 1915 ("one might rather think of the existence of a large hump of fat [German: Fettbuckel], to which the [neural spines] gave internal support") and by Jack Bowman Bailey in 1997. In support of his "buffalo-back" hypothesis, Bailey argued that in Spinosaurus, Ouranosaurus, and other dinosaurs with long neural spines, the spines were relatively shorter and thicker than the spines of pelycosaurs (which are known to have sails); instead, the dinosaurs' neural spines were similar to the neural spines of extinct hump-backed mammals such as Megacerops and Bison latifrons. In 2014, Ibrahim and colleagues instead posited that the spines were covered tightly by skin, similar to a crested chameleon, given their compactness, sharp edges, and likely poor blood flow.

Spinosaurus had a significantly smaller pelvis than that of other giant theropods, with the surface area of the ilium half that of most members of the clade. The hind limbs were short, at just over 25 percent of the total body length, with the tibia being longer than the femur. Unlike in other theropods, the hallux (or fourth toe) of Spinosaurus touched the ground, and the phalanges of the toe bones were unusually long and well-built. At their ends were shallow claws that had flat bottoms. This type of foot morphology is also seen in shorebirds, indicating that Spinosaurus's feet evolved for walking across unstable substrate and that they may have been webbed.

From the caudal vertebrae of the tail projected significantly elongated, thin neural spines, akin to the condition observed in some other spinosaurids, though to a more extreme degree. Coupled with the also elongated chevron bones on the underside of the caudals, this resulted in a deep and narrow tail with a paddle or fin-like shape, comparable to the tails of newts and crocodilians.

== Classification ==
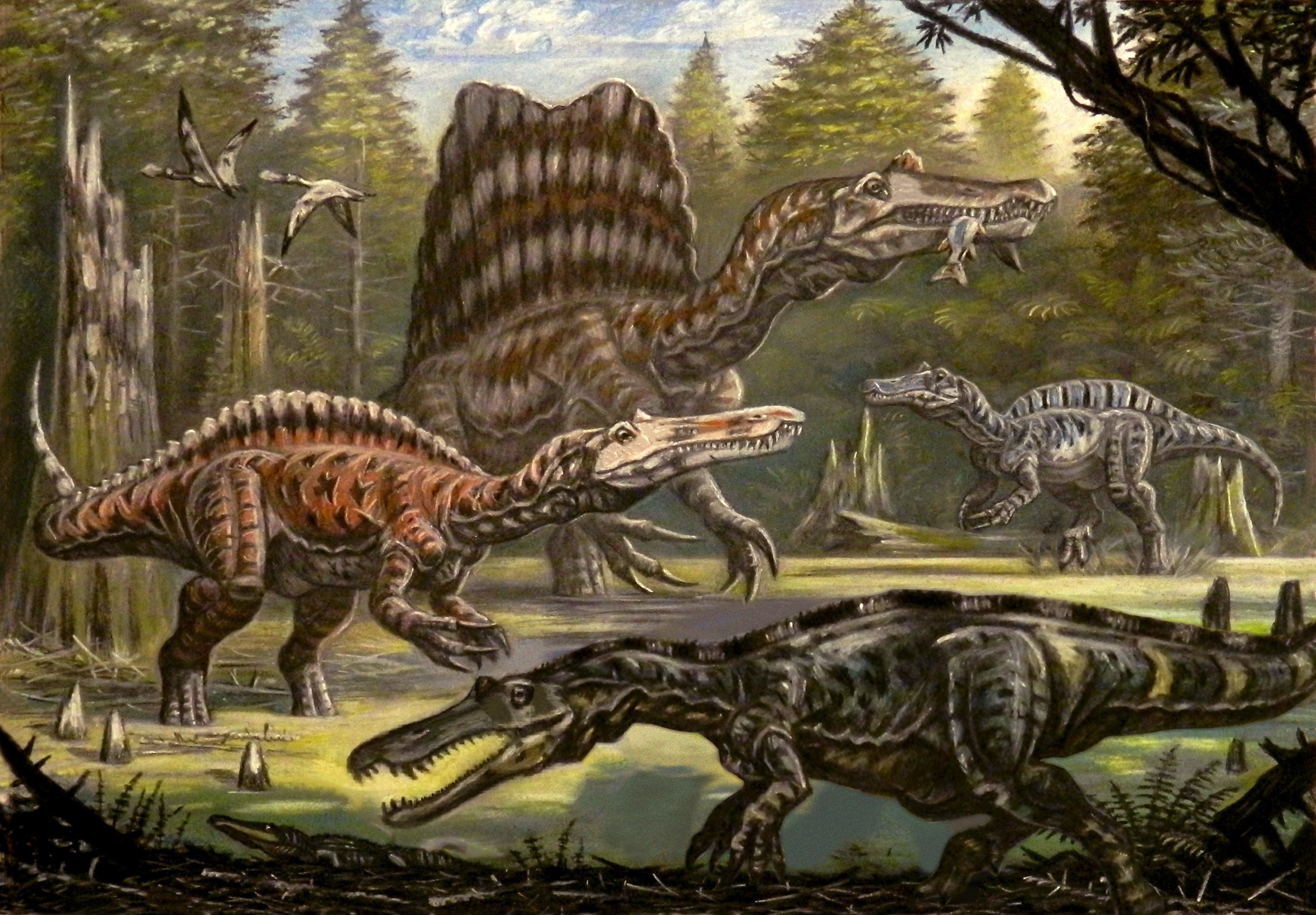
Restoration of various spinosaurids that did not live in the same time or space; Spinosaurus, Baryonyx, Irritator and Suchomimus

Spinosaurus is the type genus of the family Spinosauridae, subfamily Spinosaurinae, and tribe Spinosaurini. Spinosaurinae includes Spinosaurus, Oxalaia and Sigilmassasaurus (which may be synonyms of Spinosaurus), Irritator, Angaturama (which may be synonymous with Irritator) and possibly Ichthyovenator, Siamosaurus, and Camarillasaurus. Spinosaurini is defined as a clade including all spinosaurids closer to Spinosaurus aegyptiacus than Irritator challengeri and Oxalaia quilombensis, which are distinguished from spinosaurins due to their less elongate premaxillae and premaxillae which are excluded from the external naris. Spinosauridae was a clade named by Stromer for just Spinosaurus. Stromer noted some similarities of Spinosaurus to other theropods known at the time like Dryptosaurus and Tyrannosaurus, however due to the unique and specialized nature of Spinosaurus' teeth, vertebrae, and jaw he opted to put it in its own clade of theropods. Stromer proposed that Streptospondylus and Antrodemus (now Allosaurus) were possible ancestors of Spinosaurus, but stated that the remains of Spinosaurus were too fragmentary to be sure. From the 1920s to 1980s, Spinosaurus was typically classified as the sole member of Spinosauridae, a megalosaurid, or a carnosaur. However, some studies by paleontologists like American researcher Alfred Romer included the high-spined theropods Acrocanthosaurus and Altispinax in Spinosauridae based on their tall neural spines. This has not been supported by later studies, which typically classify these taxa as members of Carcharodontosauridae or Allosauroidea instead of Spinosauridae.

In 1986, British paleontologists Alan Charig and Angela Milner described Baryonyx, which they considered distinct enough to be classified in its own family of theropod dinosaurs: Baryonychidae. However, in 1988 American paleontologist Gregory S. Paul argued that Baryonyx and Spinosaurus were related based on their notched snouts and stated they may be late-surviving dilophosaurids. In a 1989 paper, Buffetaut supported this conclusion, stating that they were both piscivorous, related theropods. Descriptions of Irritator, Cristatusaurus, and other spinosaurids (as well as additional fossils of Spinosaurus) led to the realization of a transcontinental clade of spinosaurids. As more spinosaurids were named, the interrelationships of Spinosauridae became better understood. In 1998, Sereno and colleagues described Suchomimus, a spinosaurid from the Cretaceous of Niger. In their description, Sereno and colleagues defined Spinosauroidea as a clade including spinosaurids and torvosaurids, however this clade is considered synonymous with Megalosauroidea, and Spinosauridae as a clade composed of spinosauroids closer related to Spinosaurus aegyptiacus than Torvosaurus tanneri. Additionally, Sereno and colleagues recognized the existence of two subfamilies within Spinosauridae: Baryonychinae, which included Suchomimus and Baryonyx, and Spinosaurinae, which included Spinosaurus and Irritator. In 2004, American researcher Thomas Holtz and colleagues defined Spinosaurinae as including all spinosaurids closer related to Spinosaurus aegyptiacus than Baryonyx walkeri. The spinosaurines share unserrated straight teeth that are widely spaced (e.g., 12 on one side of the maxilla), as opposed to the baryonychines, which have serrated curved teeth that are numerous (e.g., 30 on one side of the maxilla). Since the 1990s, spinosaurids have been recognized from the Cretaceous, and possibly Jurassic, of Africa, Asia, Europe, and South America.

=== Phylogeny ===
Spinosauridae has been the subject of many different phylogenetic analyses, with Spinosaurus commonly found in a clade with spinosaurids like Irritator and Oxalaia whereas Baryonychinae often includes Baryonyx and Suchomimus. However, research by Brazilian paleontologist Marcos Sales and colleagues (2017) indicate that the South American spinosaurids Angaturama, Irritator, and Oxalaia were intermediate between Baronychinae and Spinosaurinae based on their craniodental features and cladistic analysis. This indicates that Baryonychinae may in fact be non-monophyletic and that Spinosaurinae is reduced, including only Angaturama, Spinosaurus, and Oxalaia. Their cladogram can be seen below.

- Spinosauridae
  - Baryonyx
  - Cristatusaurus
  - Suchomimus
  - - Angaturama
    - - Oxalaia
      - Spinosaurus

To test the relationships and affinities of Spinosaurus mirabilis, Sereno and colleagues included it in an updated version of the phylogenetic matrix published by Sereno et al. (2022). They consistently recovered the Nigerian taxon as the sister group to the better-known S. aegyptiacus, supporting their assignment to the same genus. The results of their Bayesian analysis are shown below:

- Spinosauridae
  - Camarillasaurus cirugedae
  - - Baryonychinae
      - Riojavenatrix lacustris
      - - - Suchomimus tenerensis
          - - Ceratosuchops inferodios
            - Sao Khua Fm. spinosaurid ('Phuwiang spinosaurid B')
        - - Baryonyx walkeri
          - - Iberospinus natarioi
            - Protathlitis cinctorrensis
    - Spinosaurinae
      - Ichthyovenator laosensis
      - - - Vallibonavenatrix cani
          - Khok Kruat Fm. spinosaurid (SM-KK14)
        - - Irritator challengeri
          - Spinosaurini
            - Oxalaia quilombensis
            - - Undescribed Brazilian spinosaurine (UFMA ITA1)
              - Spinosaurus
                - Spinosaurus aegyptiacus
                - Spinosaurus mirabilis

== Paleobiology ==
=== Function of neural spines ===
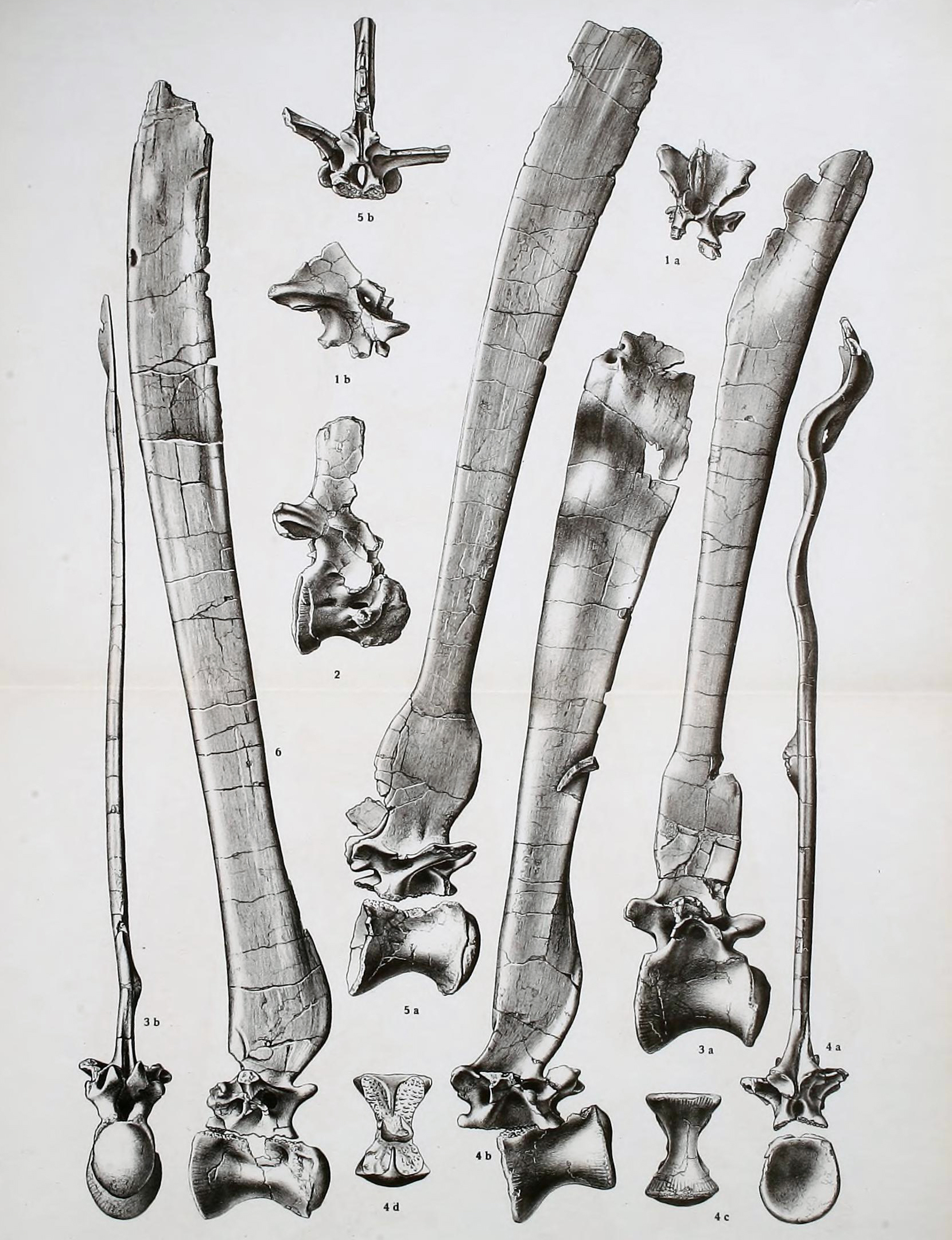
1915 illustration of S. aegyptiacus dorsal vertebrae

The function of the dinosaur's sail or hump is uncertain; scientists have proposed several hypotheses including heat regulation and display. In addition, such a prominent feature on its back could make it appear even larger than it was, intimidating other animals.

The structure may have been used for thermoregulation. If the structure contained abundant blood vessels, the animal could have used the sail's large surface area to absorb heat. This would imply that the animal was only partly warm-blooded at most and lived in climates where night-time temperatures were cool or low and the sky usually not cloudy. It is also possible that the structure was used to radiate excess heat from the body, rather than to collect it. Large animals, due to the relatively small ratio of surface area of their body compared to the overall volume (Haldane's principle), face far greater problems of dissipating excess heat at higher temperatures than gaining it at lower. Sails of large dinosaurs added considerably to the skin area of their bodies, with minimum increase of volume. Furthermore, if the sail was turned away from the sun, or positioned at a 90 degree angle towards a cooling wind, the animal would quite effectively cool itself in the warm climate of Cretaceous Africa. However, Bailey (1997) was of the opinion that a sail could have absorbed more heat than it radiated. Bailey proposed instead that Spinosaurus and other dinosaurs with long neural spines had fatty humps on their backs for energy storage, insulation, and shielding from heat.

Many elaborate body structures of modern-day animals serve to attract members of the opposite sex during mating. It is possible that the sail of Spinosaurus was used for courtship, in a way similar to a peacock's tail. Stromer speculated that the size of the neural spines may have differed between males and females.

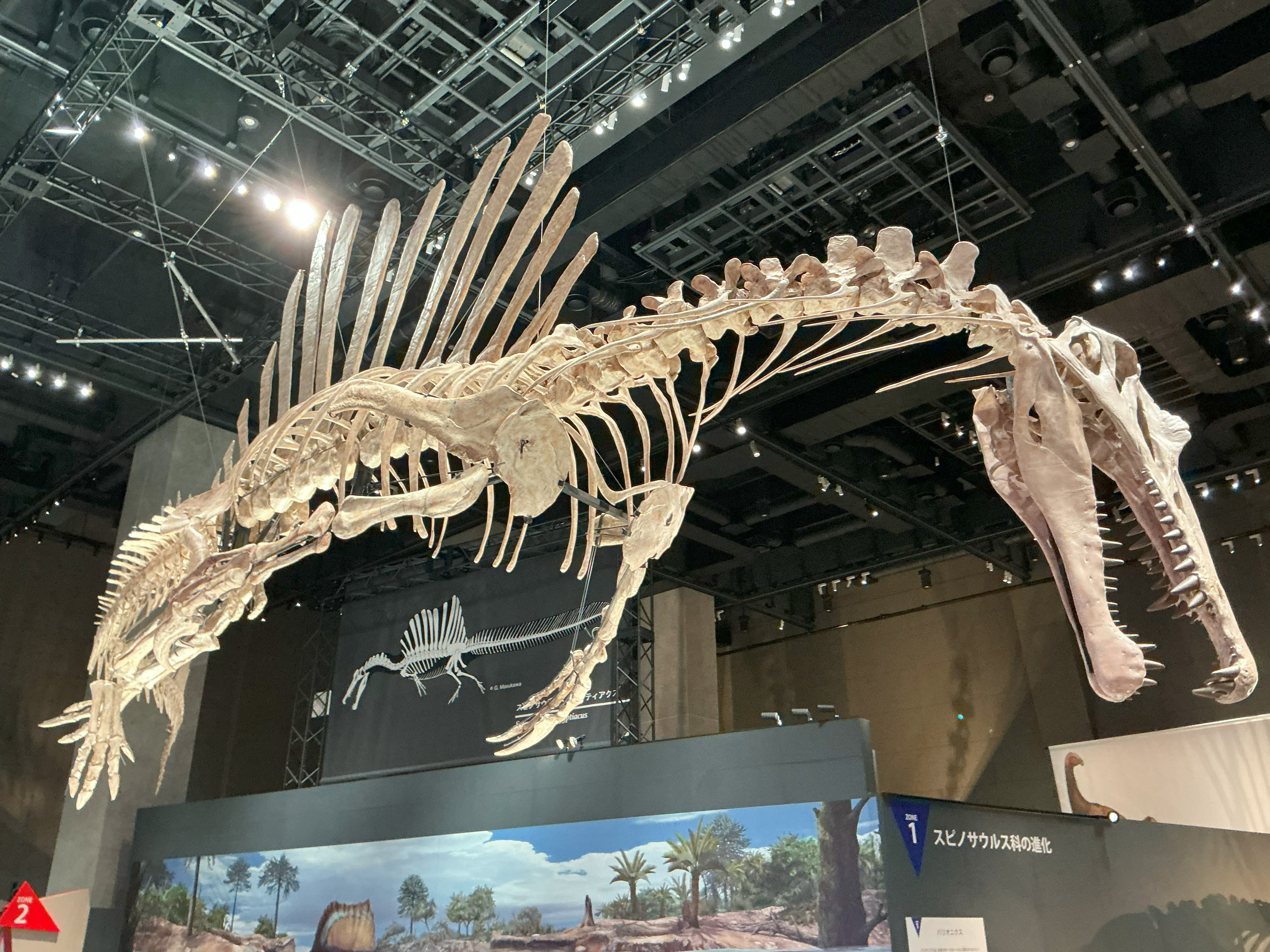
Reconstructed skeleton in Fukui Prefectural Dinosaur Museum

Gimsa and colleagues (2015) suggest that the dorsal sail of Spinosaurus was analogous to the dorsal fins of sailfish and served a hydrodynamic purpose. Gimsa and others point out that more basal, long-legged spinosaurids had otherwise round or crescent-shaped dorsal sails, whereas in Spinosaurus, the dorsal neural spines formed a shape that was roughly rectangular, similar in shape to the dorsal fins of sailfish. They therefore argue that Spinosaurus used its dorsal neural sail in the same manner as sailfish. Sailfish employ their dorsal fins for herding schools of fish into a "bait ball" where they cooperate to trap the fish into a certain area where the sailfish can snatch the fish with their bills. The sail could have possibly reduced yaw rotation by counteracting the lateral force in the direction opposite to the slash as suggested by Gimsa and colleagues (2015).

Spinosaurus anatomy exhibits another feature that may have a modern analogy: its long tail resembled that of the thresher shark, employed to slap the water to herd and stun shoals of fish before devouring them (Oliver and colleagues, 2013). The strategies that sailfish and thresher sharks employ against shoaling fish are more effective when the shoal is first concentrated into a 'bait ball' (Helfman, Collette & Facey, 1997; Oliver and colleagues, 2013; Domenici and colleagues, 2014). Since this is difficult for individual predators to achieve, they cooperate in this effort. When herding a shoal of fish or squid, sailfish also raise their sails to make themselves appear larger. When they slash or wipe their bills through shoaling fish by turning their heads, their dorsal sail and fins are outstretched to stabilize their bodies hydrodynamically (Lauder & Drucker, 2004). Domenici and colleagues (2014) postulate that these fin extensions enhance the accuracy of tapping and slashing. The sail can reduce yaw rotation by counteracting the lateral force in the direction opposite to the slash. This means that prey is less likely to recognize the massive trunk as being part of an approaching predator (Marras and colleagues, 2015; Webb & Weihs 2015).

Spinosaurus exhibited the anatomical features required to combine all three hunting strategies: a sail for herding prey more efficiently, as well as flexible tail and neck to slap the water for stunning, injuring or killing prey. The submerged dorsal sail would have provided a strong centreboard-like counterforce for powerful sidewards movements of the strong neck and long tail, as performed by sailfish (Domenici and colleagues, 2014) or thresher sharks (Oliver and colleagues, 2013). While smaller dorsal sails or fins make the dorsal water volume better accessible for slashing, it can be speculated that their smaller stabilization effect makes lateral slashing less efficient (e.g. for thresher sharks). Forming a hydrodynamic fulcrum and hydrodynamically stabilizing the trunk along the dorsoventral axis, Spinosaurus' sail would also have compensated for the inertia of the lateral neck by tail movements and vice versa not only for predation but also for accelerated swimming. This behavior might also have been one reason for Spinosaurus' muscular chest and neck reported by Ibrahim and colleagues (2014).

=== Diet and feeding ===
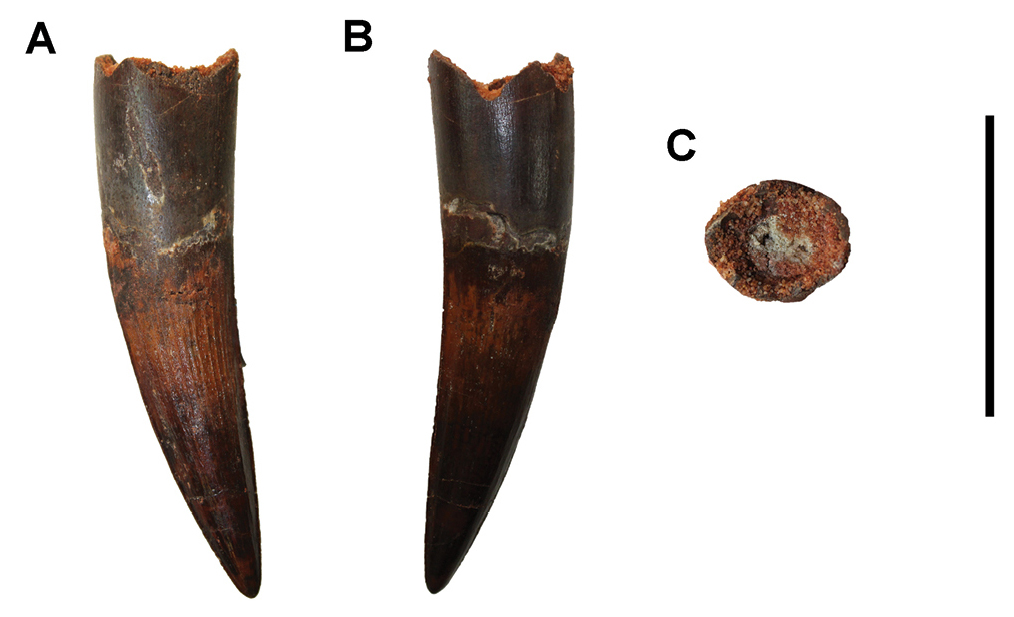
Tooth from Morocco in various views

CT scan of possible Spinosaurus snout NHMUK 16665

It is unclear whether Spinosaurus was primarily a terrestrial predator or a piscivore, as indicated by its elongated jaws, conical teeth and raised nostrils. The hypothesis of spinosaurs as specialized fish eaters has been suggested before by A. J. Charig and A. C. Milner for Baryonyx. They base this on the anatomical similarity with crocodilians and the presence of digestive acid-etched fish scales in the rib cage of the type specimen. Large fish are known from the faunas containing other spinosaurids, including the Mawsonia, in the mid-Cretaceous of northern Africa and Brazil. Direct evidence for spinosaur diet comes from related European and South American taxa. Baryonyx was found with fish scales and bones from juvenile Iguanodon in its stomach, while a tooth embedded in a South American pterosaur bone suggests that spinosaurs occasionally preyed on pterosaurs, but Spinosaurus was likely to have been a generalized and opportunistic predator, possibly a Cretaceous equivalent of large grizzly bears, being biased toward fishing, though it undoubtedly scavenged and took many kinds of small or medium-sized prey.

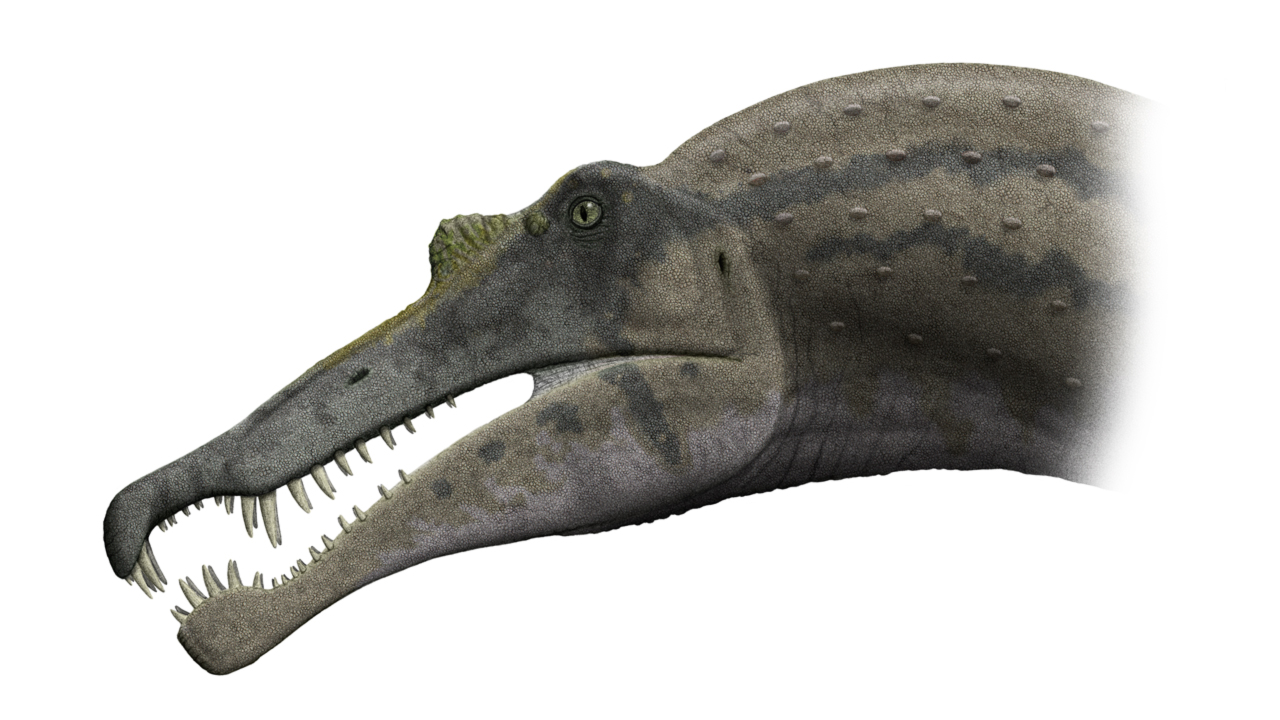
S. aegyptiacus head based on the 2005 reconstruction by Cristiano Dal Sasso

In 2009, Dal Sasso and colleagues. reported the results of X-ray computed tomography of the MSNM V4047 snout. As the foramina on the outside all communicated with a space on the inside of the snout, the authors speculated that Spinosaurus had pressure receptors inside the space that allowed it to hold its snout at the surface of the water to detect swimming prey species without seeing them. A 2013 study by Andrew R. Cuff and Emily J. Rayfield concluded that bio-mechanical data suggests that Spinosaurus was not an obligate piscivore and that its diet was more closely associated with each individual's size. The characteristic rostral morphology of Spinosaurus allowed its jaws to resist bending in the vertical direction, but its jaws were poorly adapted with respect to resisting lateral bending compared to other members of this group (Baryonyx) and modern alligators. This suggests that Spinosaurus preyed more regularly on fish than it did on land animals, although considered predators of the former too. In 2022, Sakamoto estimated that Spinosaurus had an anterior bite force of 4,829 newtons and a posterior bite force of 11,936 newtons. Based on this estimate, he asserted that the jaws of Spinosaurus are adapted for generating relatively faster shutting speeds with less muscle input force, indicating that the animal likely killed its prey with fast-snapping jaws rather than slow-crushing bites, a trait commonly observed in animals which have a semi-aquatic feeding habit.

A 2024 paper suggests that Spinosaurus and other spinosaurines in addition to fish also preyed upon small to medium-sized terrestrial vertebrates, and had relatively weak bite forces compared to those of other theropods.

A 2026 study suggested, based on the analysis of cranial remains of two genera of Spinosaurids including specimens referred to the controversial Spinosaurus maroccanus, that Spinosaurids had a highly developed and sensitive neurovascular system and a high tooth replacement rate from a young age.

=== Aquatic habits ===
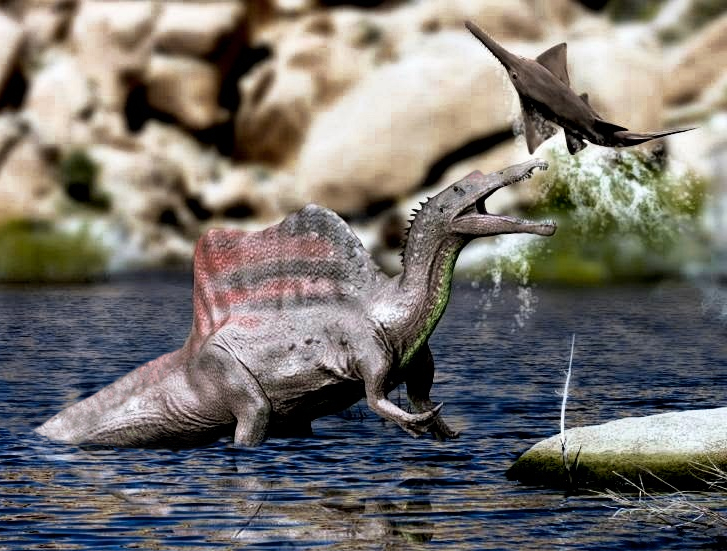
Restoration of Spinosaurus attacking the sawskate Onchopristis

A 2010 isotope analysis by Romain Amiot and colleagues found that oxygen isotope ratios of spinosaurid teeth, including teeth of Spinosaurus, indicate semiaquatic lifestyles. Isotope ratios from tooth enamel and from other parts of Spinosaurus (found in Morocco and Tunisia) and of other predators from the same area such as Carcharodontosaurus were compared with isotopic compositions from contemporaneous theropods, turtles, and crocodilians. The study found that Spinosaurus teeth from five of six sampled localities had oxygen isotope ratios closer to those of turtles and crocodilians when compared with other theropod teeth from the same localities. The authors postulated that Spinosaurus switched between terrestrial and aquatic habitats to compete for food with large crocodilians and other large theropods respectively. A 2018 study by Donald Henderson, however, refutes the claim that Spinosaurus was semiaquatic. By studying the buoyancy in lungs of crocodilians and comparing it to the lung placement in Spinosaurus, it was discovered that Spinosaurus could not sink or dive below the water surface. It was also capable of keeping its entire head above the water surface while floating, much like other non-aquatic theropods. Furthermore, the study found that Spinosaurus had to continually paddle its hind legs to prevent itself from tipping over onto its side, something that extant semiaquatic animals do not need to perform. Henderson therefore theorized that Spinosaurus probably did not hunt completely submerged in water as previously hypothesized, but instead would have spent much of its time on land or in shallow water.

Later studies of the tail vertebrae of Spinosaurus refute Henderson's proposal that Spinosaurus mainly inhabited areas of land near and in shallow water and was too buoyant to submerge. Studies of the tail, thanks to fossils recovered and analyzed by Ibrahim, Pierce, Lauder, and Sereno and colleagues in 2018 indicate that Spinosaurus had a keeled tail that was well adapted to propelling the animal through water. The elongated neural spines and chevrons, which run to the end of the tail on both dorsal and ventral sides, indicate that Spinosaurus was able to swim in a similar manner to modern crocodilians. Through experimentation by Lauder and Pierce, the tail of Spinosaurus was found to have eight times as much forward thrust as the tails of terrestrial theropods like Coelophysis and Allosaurus, as well as being twice as efficient at achieving forward thrust. The discovery indicates that Spinosaurus may have had a lifestyle comparable to modern alligators and crocodiles, remaining in water for long periods of time while hunting.

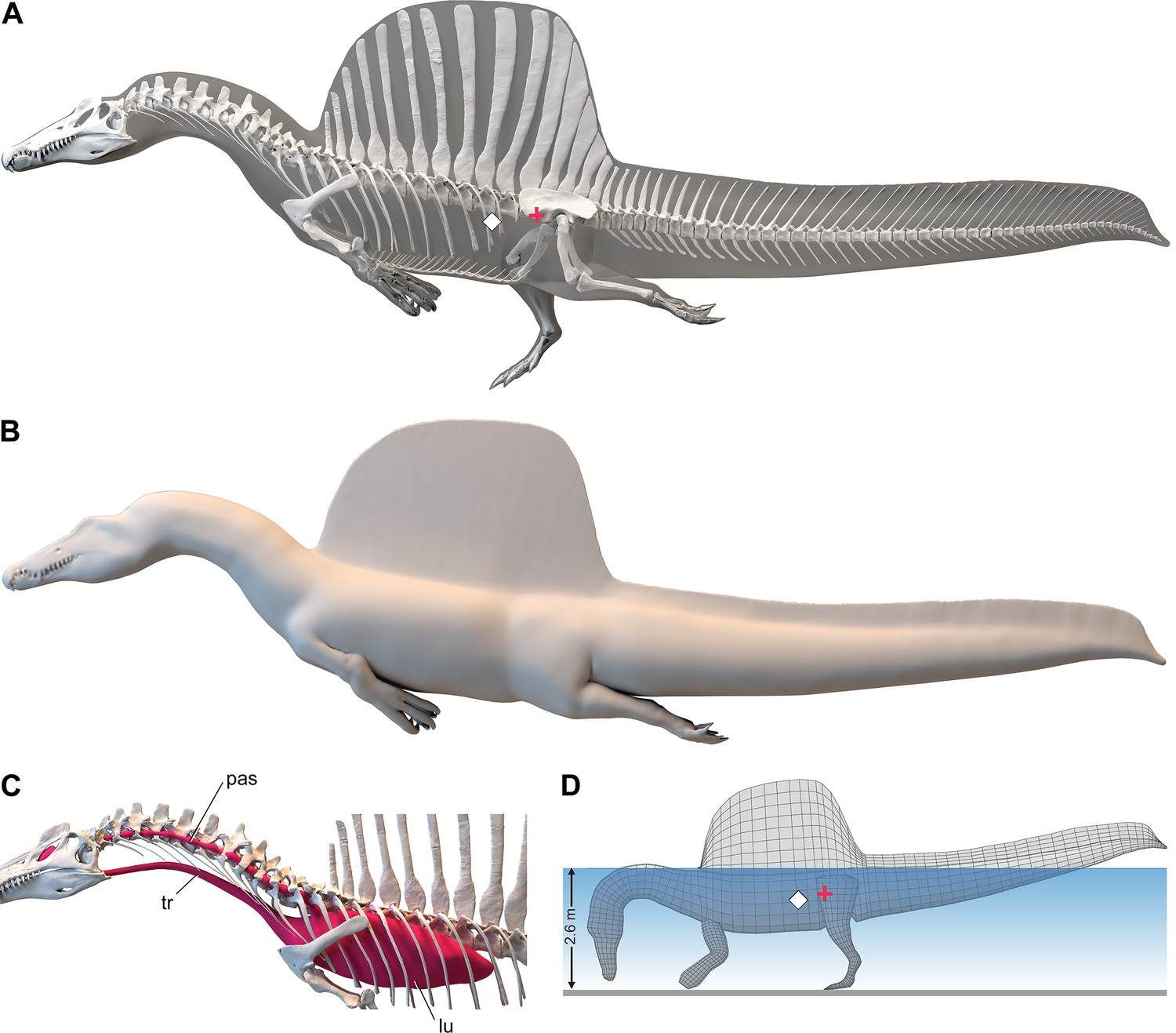
Flesh model of S. aegyptiacus used for a 2022 buoyancy study

David Hone and Thomas Holtz published a paper in 2021 in which they argue that the anatomy of Spinosaurus is more consistent with a shoreline generalist lifestyle rather than an active aquatic pursuit predator as suggested by Ibrahim. They highlight the positioning of the nostrils and orbits as one reason why a crocodile-like lifestyle is unlikely: they are ventrally positioned in such a way that the whole head would have to be lifted inefficiently out of the water in order to breathe. Additionally, they argue that the general body shape of Spinosaurus is poorly adapted for this lifestyle, drawing on the amount of water drag and aquatic instability from the sail, as well as the rigid trunk and seemingly scarcely-muscled tail. Animals like crocodilians require a flexible body in order to move through the water and make sharp turns when chasing prey, and this is directly contradicted by Hone and Holtz's findings.

In 2022, Fabbri and colleagues made comparisons of Spinosaurus' bone structure and compared it to that of Baryonyx and Suchomimus. The study revealed that Spinosaurus and Baryonyx had dense bones, which allowed them to dive and pursue prey underwater. Compared to these, Suchomimus had more hollow bones, suggesting it preferred to hunt in shallow water. These findings also suggest that various spinosaurid genera were more ecologically disparate than previously believed, as some were better suited to hunting in subaqueous environments than other, closely related genera.

In the same year, contradicting the study by Fabbri and colleagues, Sereno and his colleagues suggested that Spinosaurus was wholly bipedal on land and an unstable, slow moving surface swimmer in deep water. Their results, taken from reconstructing a CT model of the skeleton, and then adding internal air and muscles. Their results, coupled with fossils from Spinosaurus that showed it also lived further inland along rivers and lakes, suggest it was a semi-aquatic, ambush piscivore that preferred waterside environments both along the coasts and further inland along rivers and lakes. Simultaneously, they suggested that the large tail fin was probably utilized more for display than swimming, as tails in living animals have the same function when they possess comparably tall neural spines.

A 2024 paper by Myrhvold and colleagues also disputes that Spinosaurus and Baryonyx were diving pursuit predators. Instead, they also argue that Spinosaurus and Baryonyx hunted more like herons instead of diving after prey. Another paper in the same year analyzed the linear measurements of the skull of Spinosaurus, and concluded that the skull morphology and hunting method of Spinosaurus would likely be the most similar to those of wading birds like herons, though the authors noted that they are uncertain how beneficial the skull would have been for the diving pursuit predation method.

A 2026 paper by Cau and colleagues analyzed five spinosaurine skulls (including Spinosaurus specimen MSNM V4047) and found evidence for the presence of salt glands similar to those of semi-aquatic and aquatic birds. They suggested that Spinosaurus and other derived, related spinosaurines were able to hunt in brackish and saltwater environments. They noted that the evidence of salt glands do not necessarily confirm whether spinosaurines are fully aquatic, diving pursuit predators, or hunted prey like modern wading birds.

=== Locomotion and posture ===
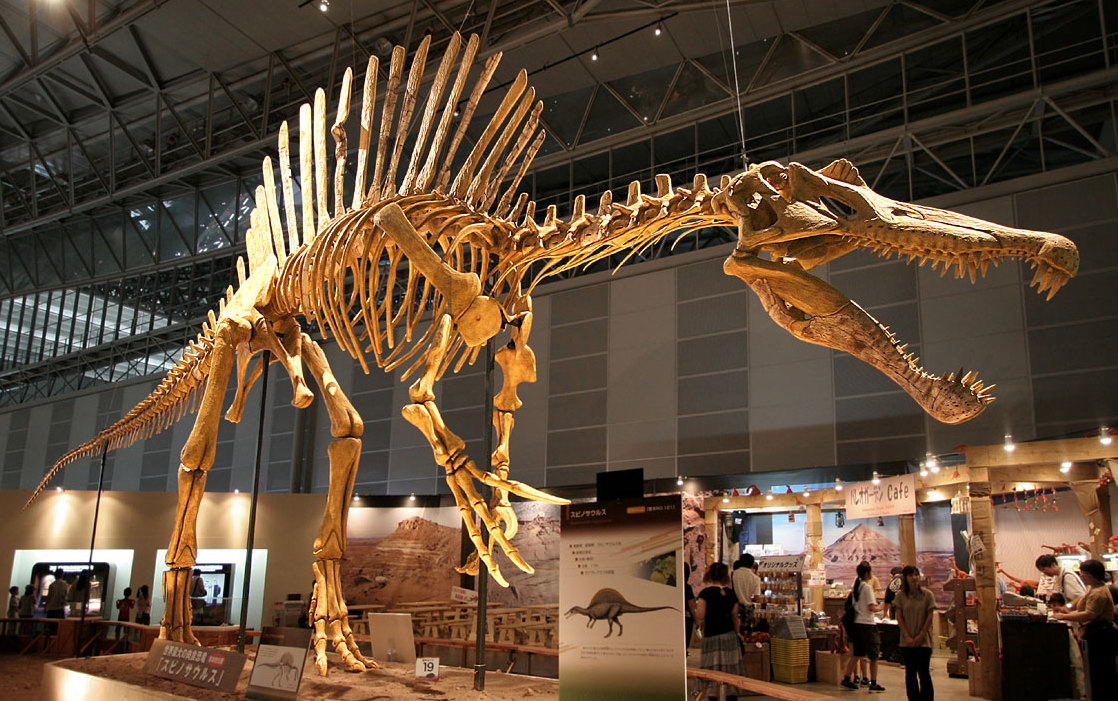
Reconstructed skeleton with traditional, long-legged posture

Although traditionally depicted in the scientific community as a biped, Spinosaurus was occasionally depicted in the mid-20th century as an obligate quadruped akin to Dimetrodon. Starting in the mid-1970s, it was hypothesized Spinosaurus was at least an occasional quadruped, bolstered by the discovery of Baryonyx, a relative with robust arms. Because of the mass of the hypothesized fatty dorsal humps of Spinosaurus, Bailey (1997) was open to the possibility of a quadrupedal posture, leading to new restorations of it as such. Theropods, including spinosaurids, could not pronate their hands (rotate the forearm so the palm faced the ground), but a resting position on the side of the hand was possible, as shown by fossil prints from an Early Jurassic theropod. The hypothesis that Spinosaurus had a typical quadrupedal gait since fell out of favor, however it was still believed that spinosaurids may have crouched in a quadrupedal posture, due to biological and physiological constraints.

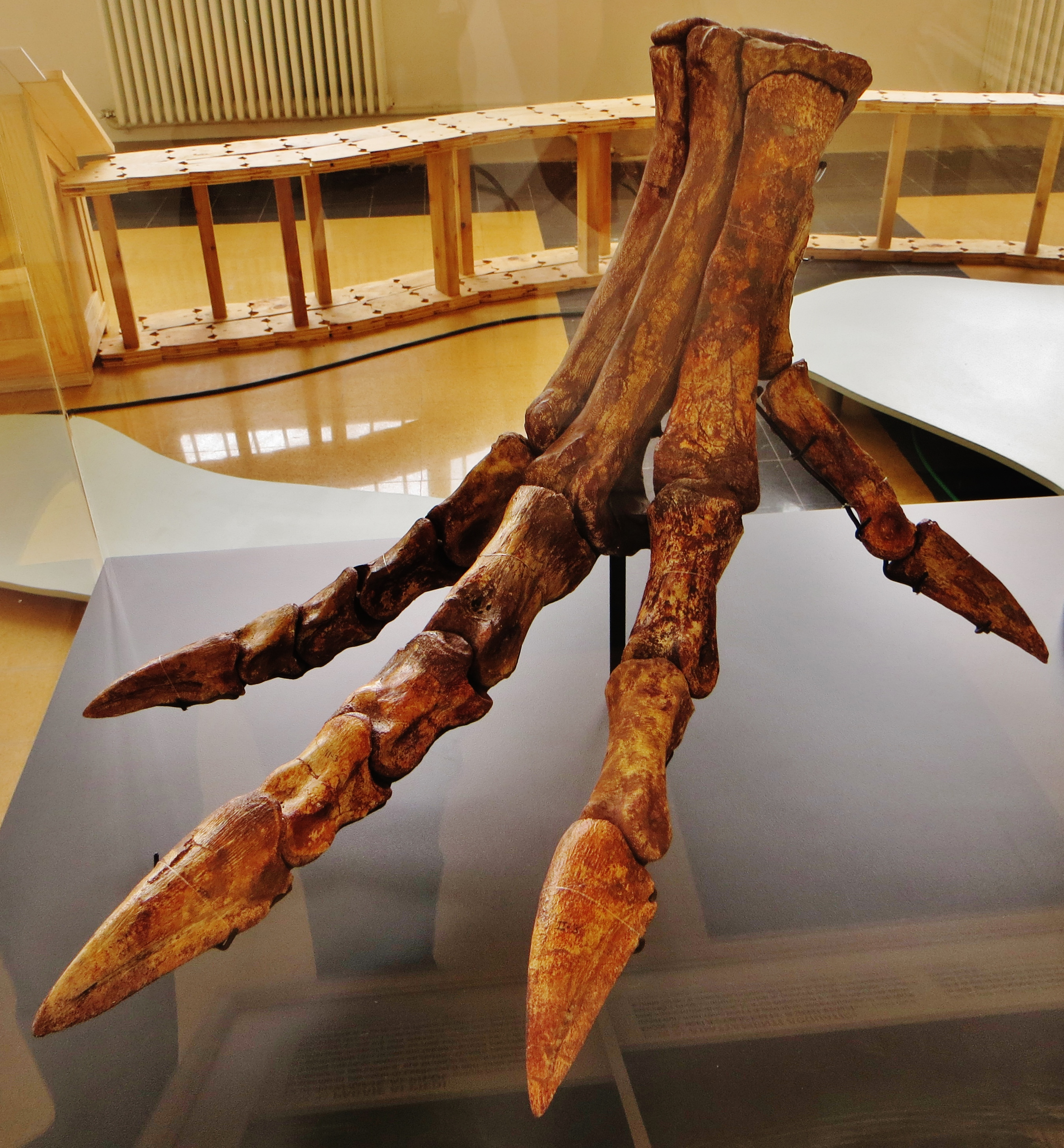
Reconstructed foot, note straight claws and large hallux

The possibility of a quadrupedal Spinosaurus was revived by a 2014 paper by Ibrahim and colleagues that described new material of the animal. The paper found that the hind limbs of Spinosaurus were much shorter than previously believed, and that its center of mass was located in the midpoint of the torso region, as opposed to near the hip as in typical bipedal theropods. It was therefore proposed that Spinosaurus was poorly adapted for bipedal terrestrial locomotion, and must have been an obligate quadruped on land. The reconstruction used in the study was an extrapolation based on different sized individuals, scaled to what were assumed to be the correct proportions. Paleontologist John Hutchinson of the Royal Veterinary College of the University of London has expressed skepticism to the new reconstruction, and cautioned that using different specimens can result in inaccurate chimaeras. Scott Hartman also expressed criticism because he believed the legs and the pelvis were inaccurately scaled (27% too short) and didn't match the published lengths. However, Mark Witton expressed agreement with the proportions reported in the paper. In their 2015 re-description of Sigilmassasaurus, Evers and colleagues argued that Sigilmassasaurus was in fact a distinct genus from Spinosaurus, and therefore doubted whether the material assigned to Spinosaurus by Ibrahim et al. (2014) should be assigned to Spinosaurus or Sigilmassasaurus. In 2018, an analysis by Henderson found that Spinosaurus probably was competent at bipedal terrestrial locomotion; the center of mass was instead found to be close to the hips, allowing Spinosaurus to stand upright like other bipedal theropods.

A 2024 article co-authored by Sereno stated that the previous calculations by Sereno that were used to argue quadrupedality for Spinosaurus had erroneously shifted the center of mass in front of the hips. They instead suggested that the dinosaur fit the criteria of being a graviportal (or slow-moving) biped.

=== Ontogeny ===
An ungual phalanx measuring 21 millimeters (0.83 in) belonging to a very young juvenile cf. S. aegyptiacus indicates that the theropod developed its semiaquatic adaptations at a very young age or at birth and maintained them throughout its life. The specimen, discovered in 1999 and described by Simone Maganuco and Cristiano Dal Sasso in 2018, is believed to have come from an animal measuring 1.78 meters (5.8 ft) (assuming it resembled a smaller version of the adult), making it the smallest specimen of Spinosaurus currently known.

=== Palaeopathology ===
A cf. Spinosaurus sp. tooth from the Ifezouane Formation displays enhanced lingual curvature to the tooth's crown, the development of three deep grooves extending from crown root junction in the direction of the crown's apex, an attenuated carina that does not extend apically nor to the base of the tooth, and a wear facet at the tip.

== Paleoecology ==
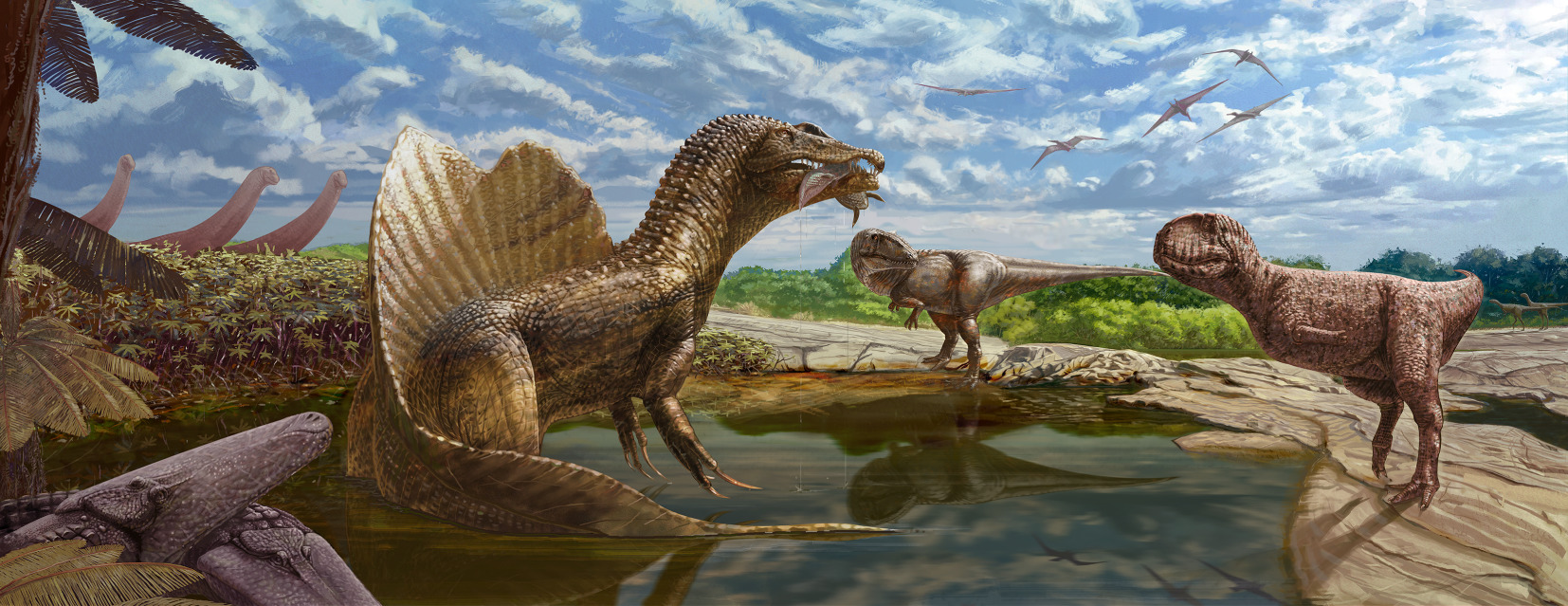
Restoration of the fauna of the Bahariya Formation, with Spinosaurus in the center

The holotype specimen of Spinosaurus is known from the Bahariya Formation, one of many dinosaur-bearing Cretaceous-aged fossil formations in North Africa. However, fossils of Spinosaurus have been described from several sites including the Kem Kem Beds of Morocco, the Farak, and Echkar Formations of Niger, the Gara Samani Formation of Algeria, and the Chenini Sandstones. This would indicate that the distribution of Spinosaurus is similar to that of Bahariasaurus/Deltadromeus, a large theropod of unknown affinities, though Deltadromeus' taxonomy and distribution too is debated. North Africa during this period bordered the Tethys Sea, which transformed the region into a mangrove-dominated coastal environment filled with vast tidal flats and waterways.

The composition of the dinosaur fauna of North Africa at this time is an anomaly, as there are fewer herbivorous dinosaur species relative to carnivorous dinosaur species than in most fossil sites. This abundance of theropods compared to that of non-theropods was dubbed "Stromer's Riddle", which despite suggestions that this is due to ecological, preservation, or other biases, is supported by the fossil record. This over prevalence of theropods indicates that there was niche partitioning between the different theropod clades, with spinosaurids consuming fish while other groups hunted herbivorous dinosaurs. Isotopic evidence supports this, which found greater quantities of sizable, terrestrial animals in the diets of carcharodontosaurids and ceratosaurs from both the Kem Kem Beds and Elrhaz Formation. North Africa was dominated by a triumvirate of Abelisauroidea, Spinosauridae, and Carcharodontosauridae during the mid-Cretaceous, with all of these groups present in the Kem Kem Beds, Echkar, Elrhaz, and Bahariya Formations. The abelisauroid affinities of Deltadromeus/Bahariasaurus suggest that they may be omnivorous or herbivorous. This would indicate niche partitioning in the large theropods in these localities, with Deltadromeus/Bahariasaurus filling a niche typically filled by ornithischians, though no skull material is known from either.

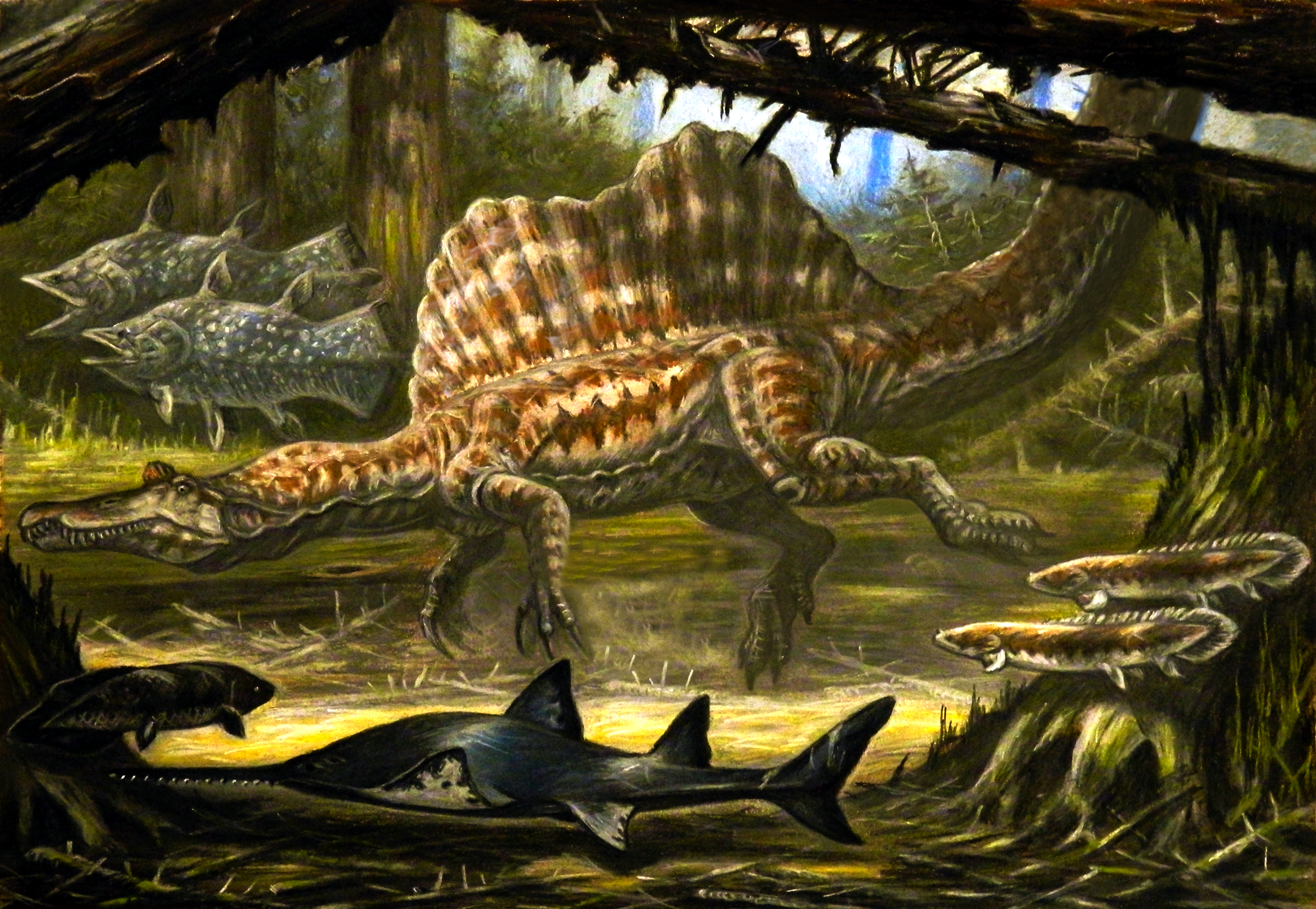
Spinosaurus swimming underwater with an Onchopristis (bottom), a Ceratodus (lower left), two Bawitius (lower right), and a Mawsonia (upper left) in the Bahariya Formation

=== Bahariya Formation ===
Fossils from the Bahariya Formation came from tidal flat deposits containing in the form of fossil leaves and root systems, a mangrove vegetation of seed ferns, Weichselia reticulata. Alongside the coeval theropods Tameryraptor and Bahariasaurus, Spinosaurus is one of several theropod dinosaurs known from the Bahariya Formation. Fossils of sauropods include those of the titanosaurs Paralititan and Aegyptosaurus, the former reaching great sizes. The faunal composition of both the Bahariya Formation and the Kem Kem Beds were thought to be similar in the past, but the describers of Tameryraptor suggested that such superficial comparisons require further examination. Contemporary abelisaurid dinosaurs from the Bahariya Formation were also terrestrial carnivores, preying on other terrestrial fauna. An isolated wing phalanx of a pterosaur, potentially Anhanguera, was unearthed from the Bahariya Formation. A diverse fauna of aquatic animals is known from the Bahariya Formation. Underwater life diversity exploded during this period in the mangroves of North Africa, with turtles represented by the pleurodian Apertotemporalis, large bony fish like Mawsonia and Paranogmius, sawskates Onchopristis and Schizorhiza, sharks like Squalicorax and Cretolamna, and a broad selection of invertebrates. Additionally, several crocodylomorphs like the stomatosuchid Stomatosuchus and the eunotosuchian Libycosuchus are known from the formation.

=== Kem Kem Beds ===
The Kem Kem Beds is composed of three geologic formations: the Gara Sbaa Formation, the Douria Formation, and the Izefouane Formation. Spinosaurus fossils are exclusively known from the latter two formations. Isotopes from Carcharodontosaurus and Spinosaurus fossils suggest that the Kem Kem Beds witnessed a temporary monsoon season rather than constant rainfall, similar to modern conditions present in sub-tropical and tropical environments in Southeast Asia and Sub-Saharan Africa. This river system was freshwater based on the presence of lungfishes and other typically freshwater vertebrates. This indicates that the Kem Kem Beds had a wide variety of features, including river channels, river banks, sandbars, and more. Fossils of giant fishes have been found in the Kem Kem Beds, including the sawskate Onchopristis, coelacanth Axelrodichthys, and bichir Bawitius. The Kem Kem Beds also preserves an abundance of crocodyliformes like the aegyptosuchid Aegisuchus (which Spinosaurus may have preyed on), the stomatosuchid Laganosuchus, the peirosaurid Hamadasuchus, and the pholidosaurid Elosuchus. This region also bore an abundance of pterosaurs like the toothed anhanguerids Siroccopteryx and Nicorhynchus and the edentulous azhdarchoids Alanqa (which Spinosaurus may have preyed on) and Leptostomia.

The Kem Kem Beds preserve many dinosaur fossils. Sauropod dinosaurs are known by the rebbachisaurid sauropod Rebbachisaurus, an indeterminate somphospondylian titanosauriform, and an indeterminate titanosaur, one comparable in size to the giant Paralititan. Ornithischian fossils are extremely rare, only being represented from an isolated thyreophoran tooth and footprints of an ornithopod, possibly similar to Iguanodon. As for theropods, many are known, including Spinosaurus, Sigilmassasaurus, if it is valid, and possibly another distinct spinosaurid taxon, one or two distinct indeterminate abelisaurids, the carcharodontosaurids Carcharodontosaurus and Sauroniops, which may be a nomem dubium, and indeterminate noasaurids. However, many of these dinosaurs are known from isolated or incomplete remains, have complicated taxonomies, or are under study.

== In popular culture ==
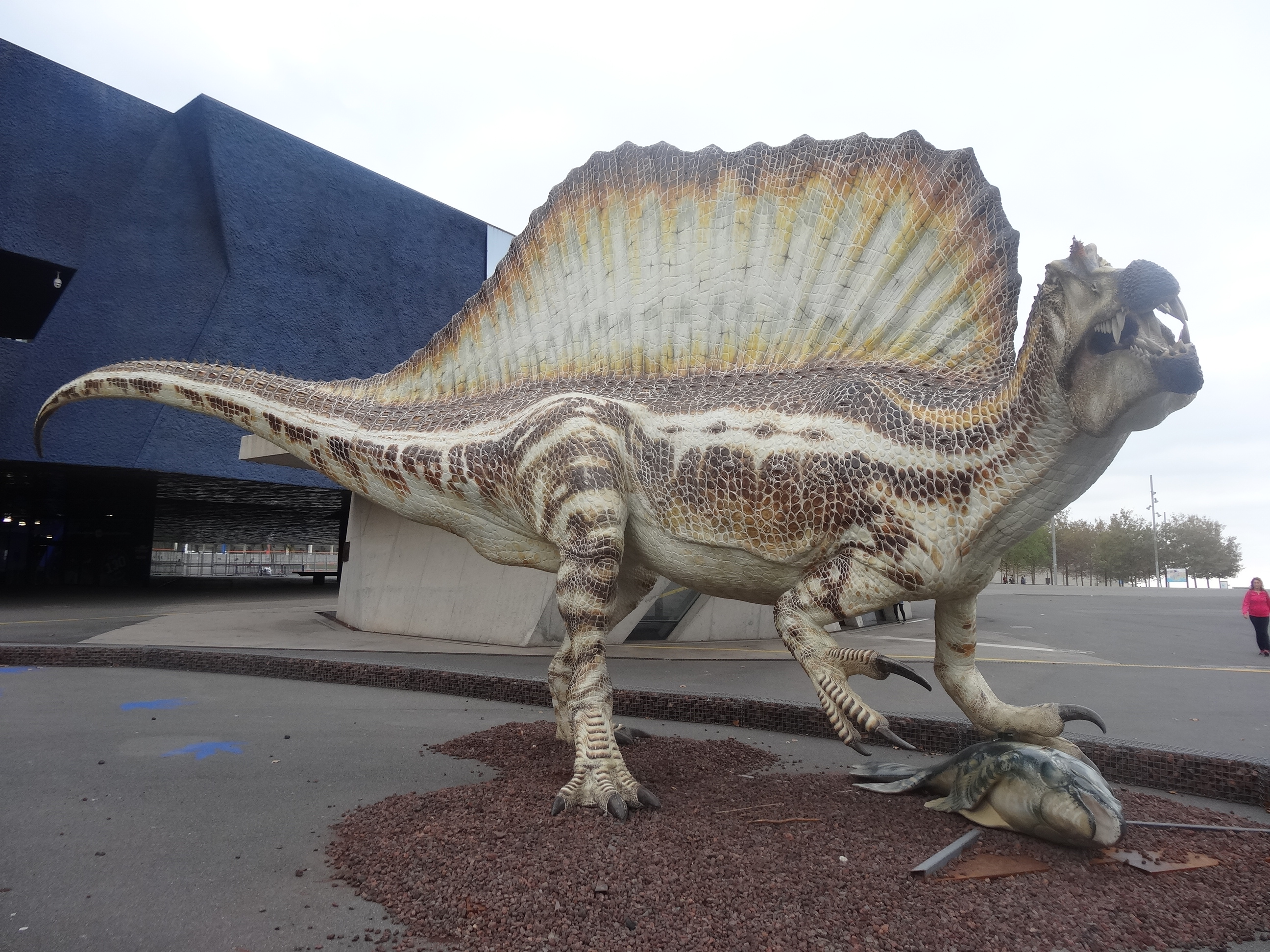
Sculpture based on the 2014 reconstruction, prior to the discovery of the paddle-like tail, Museum of Natural Science, Barcelona

Spinosaurus appeared in the 2001 film Jurassic Park III, replacing Tyrannosaurus as the main antagonist. The film's consulting paleontologist John R. Horner was quoted as saying, "If we base the ferocious factor on the length of the animal, there was nothing that ever lived on this planet that could match this creature [Spinosaurus]. Also my hypothesis is that T-rex was actually a scavenger rather than a killer. Spinosaurus was really the predatory animal." He has since retracted the statement about T. rex being a scavenger. In the film, Spinosaurus was portrayed as larger and more powerful than Tyrannosaurus: in a scene depicting a battle between the two resurrected predators, Spinosaurus emerges victorious by snapping the Tyrannosaurus' neck. In the fourth film, Jurassic World, there is a nod to this fight where the T. rex smashes through the skeleton of a Spinosaurus in the climactic fight near the end of the film. The Spinosaurus would appear in many Jurassic Park games, most notably Jurassic World Evolution and its sequels. The same Spinosaurus from the third film returns in the fourth, and fifth season of Jurassic World Camp Cretaceous, this time battling two T. rex. Spinosaurus return in Jurassic World Rebirth in a more realistic depiction, and having a coexisting relationship with a Mosasaurus.

Spinosaurus has long been depicted in popular books about dinosaurs, although only recently has there been enough information about spinosaurids for an accurate depiction. After an influential 1955 skeletal reconstruction by Lapparent and Lavocat based on a 1936 diagram by Stromer, it has been treated as a generalized upright theropod, with a skull similar to that of other large theropods and a sail on its back, even having four-fingered hands.

In addition to films, action figures, video games, and books, Spinosaurus has been depicted on postage stamps from countries such as Angola, The Gambia, and Tanzania.

== See also ==
- Baryonyx
- Halszkaraptor
- Koreaceratops
- Liaoningosaurus
- Lurdusaurus
- Suchomimus
