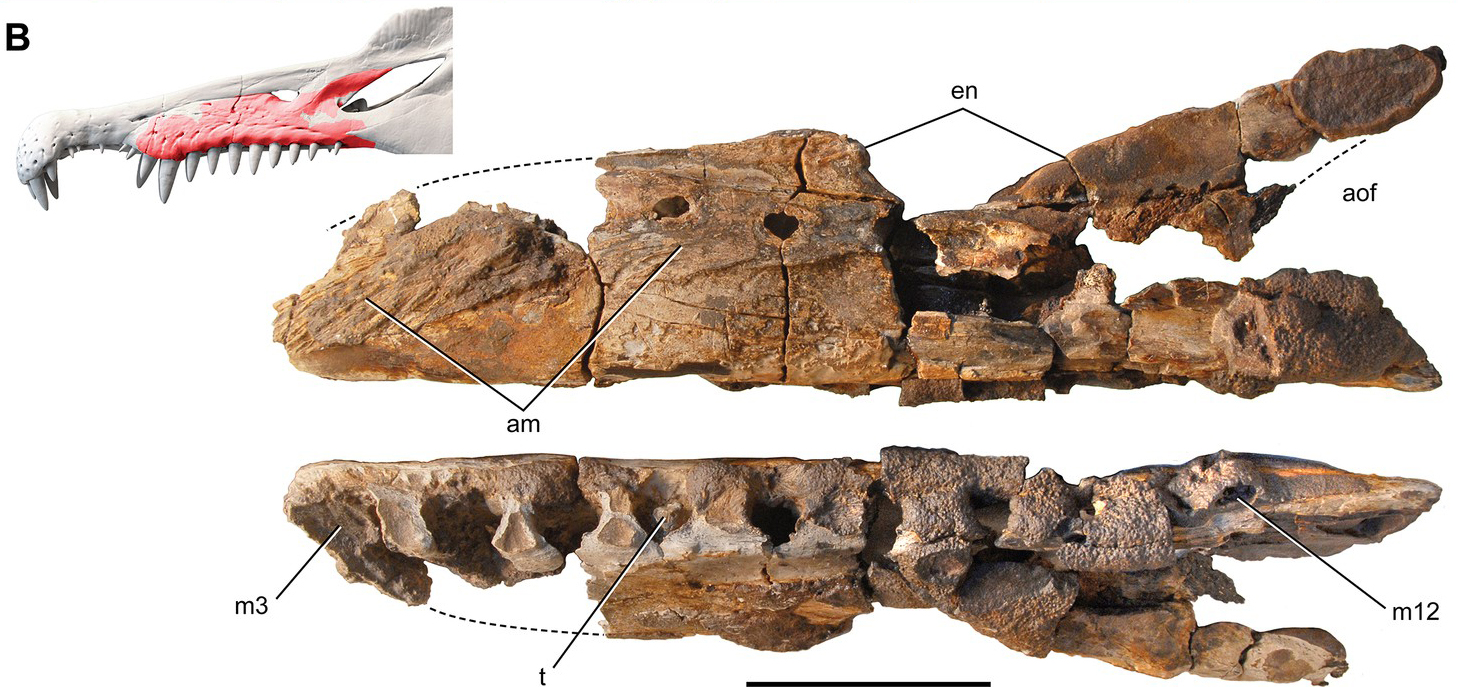
- Maxilla of the S. mirabilis holotype

Scientific classification
- Kingdom: Animalia
- Phylum: Chordata
- Class: Reptilia
- Clade: Dinosauria
- Clade: Saurischia
- Clade: Theropoda
- Family: †Spinosauridae
- Tribe: †Spinosaurini
- Genus: †Spinosaurus
- Species: †S. mirabilis

Binomial name
- †Spinosaurus mirabilis Sereno et al., 2026

= Spinosaurus mirabilis =

Spinosaurus mirabilis Temporal range: Late Cretaceous (Cenomanian), ~95 Ma

Species of theropod dinosaurs

Spinosaurus mirabilis is a large extinct species of the spinosaurid theropod dinosaur genus Spinosaurus, known from the Late Cretaceous Farak Formation of Niger. The species was named and described in 2026, based on various cranial and postcranial bones collected in two localities. It is characterized by a long, low snout, a scimitar-shaped midline crest on the top of the skull, and a large sail over the back.

== Discovery and naming ==
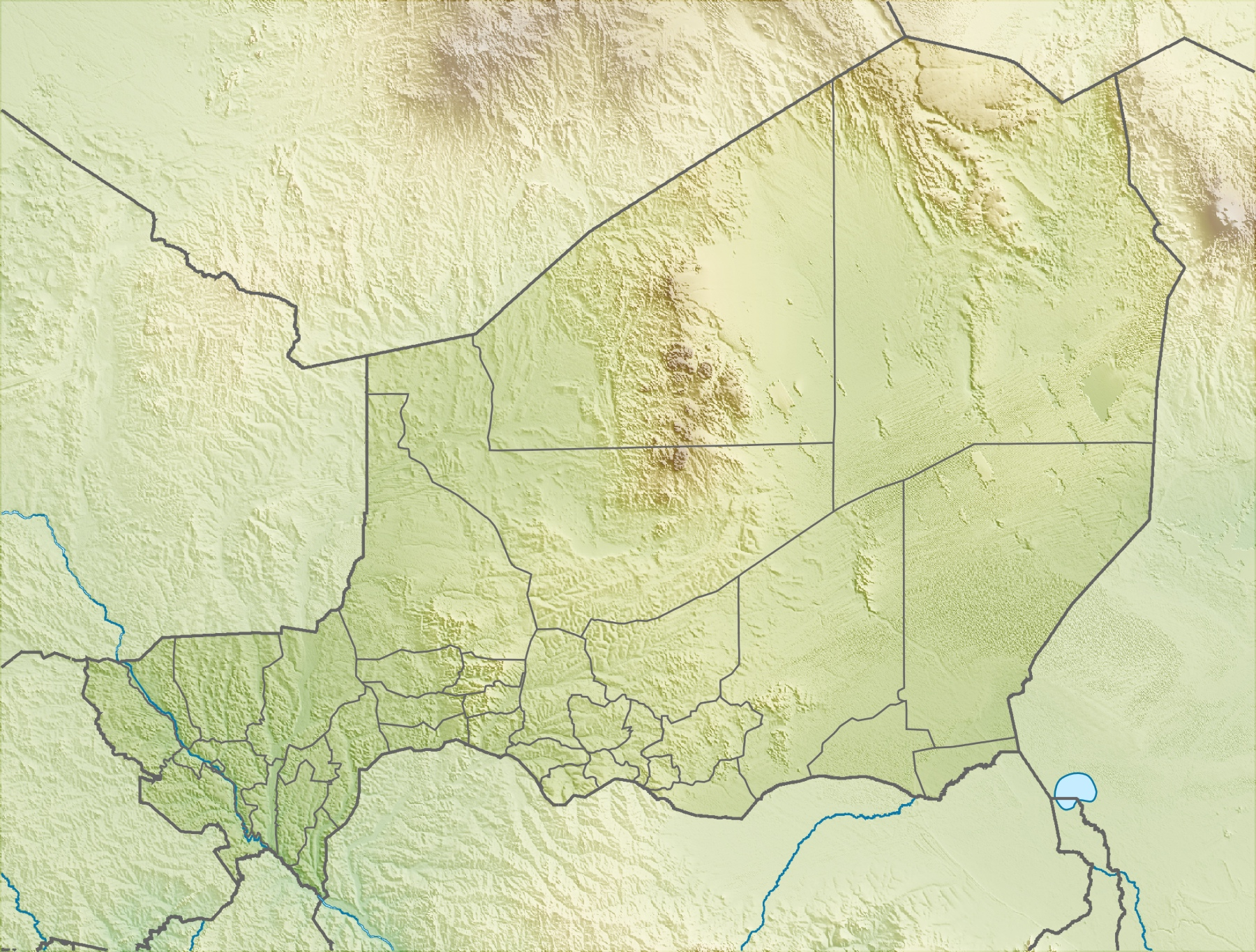
Localities in Niger from which S. mirabilis is known

Fossils of Spinosaurus mirabilis were collected from outcrops of the Farak Formation of Niger during a series of excavations in 2000, 2019, and 2022, led by paleontologist Paul Sereno. Material was collected from two localities, Iguidi and Jenguebi. Most of the material comes from the latter, including the holotype specimen, accessioned as MNBH JEN1, which comprises a fragmentary skull (right premaxilla, both maxillae, nasal crest, part of the right dentary, and five maxillary teeth). A second Jenguebi specimen, MNBH JEN2, includes part of a left maxilla, a nasal crest, fragments of the cervical (neck) and dorsal (back) vertebrae, part of the left ischium, and part of the left femur. Other specimens from this locality, MNBH JEN3–9, include a left maxilla, isolated teeth, another partial nasal crest, a right dentary, partial dorsal and caudal (tail) vertebrae, a partial chevron, a left tibia, and pedal phalanges (toe bones). Material from Iguidi, MNBH IGU11, 25, and 38–40, includes many isolated tooth crowns, fragments of the dorsal vertebrae, part of a caudal vertebra, and a single toe bone. As of its 2026 description, the Iguidi material is temporarily on loan to Sereno's Fossil Lab at the University of Chicago, while all other specimens, including the holotype, are held at Abdou Moumouni University in Niger.

MNBH IGU11, an anterior dorsal centrum, was initially identified as a mid-cervical centrum and referred to the coeval carcharodontosaurid Carcharodontosaurus iguidensis due to its similarities to cervical vertebrae erroneously referred to C. saharicus, which actually come from a spinosaurid. This dorsal centrum was later thought to belong to Sigilmassasaurus or an indeterminate species of Spinosaurus until the description of S. mirabilis referred it to the species. In 2022, Sereno and colleagues identified MNBH JEN1 and MNBH JEN2 (then under the specimen numbers MNBH EGA1 and MNBH EGA2, respectively) as belonging to an indeterminate species of Spinosaurus.

In 2026, Sereno and colleagues described Spinosaurus mirabilis as a new species of the genus Spinosaurus based on these fossil remains. The specific name, mirabilis, is a Latin word meaning 'astonishing', alluding to the remarkably enlarged nasal-prefrontal crest that characterizes the species. Sereno and colleagues gave the species the nickname "hell heron".

== Description ==
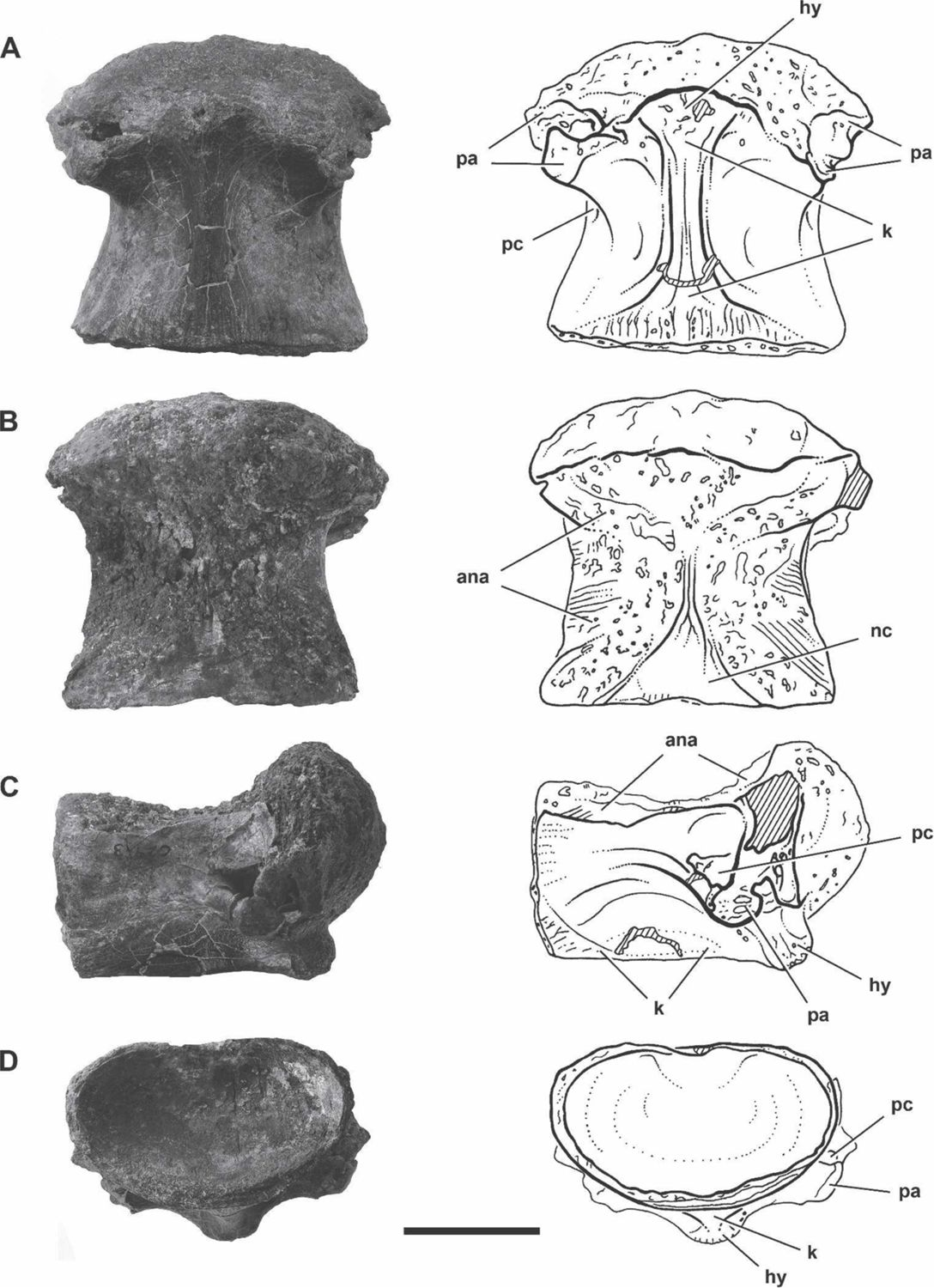
MNBH IGU11, a dorsal vertebral centrum referred to S. mirabilis

As expected, the skeletal anatomy of Spinosaurus mirabilis is similar to S. aegyptiacus, the type species of the genus. It is only known from immature specimens, so the full size of this species when mature is uncertain. The holotype specimen, which belongs to a subadult individual, was estimated to have a full body length of around 8 metres (26 ft). This is about 15% smaller than FSAC-KK-11888, the proposed neotype of S. aegyptiacus, and about 61% the size of MSMN V4047 (a partial snout), one of the largest S. aegyptiacus specimens.

A diastema (gap between the teeth) is present in the upper jaw to accommodate three of the large lower jaw teeth. The end of the snout in S. mirabilis differs from S. aegyptiacus in its slightly more arched premaxilla that rises above the rest of the snout, and subquadrate-shaped expansion of the anterior dentary, compared to the rounder morphology in S. aegyptiacus. Specimen MNBH JEN4, which preserves a dentary and tibia, suggests the hindlimbs of S. mirabilis may be slightly proportionally longer than S. aegyptiacus. The morphology of the preserved dorsal vertebrae implies the presence of a trunk sail formed by greatly elongated neural spines, although the shape of this sail is unknown. Autapomorphies (unique derived traits) identified in S. mirabilis include the proportionately low snout compared to other spinosaurids, with the dorsal and ventral margins parallel when seen from the side. The spacing of the rear maxillary teeth is also greater than in S. aegyptiacus.

One of the most unique traits of S. mirabilis is its distinctive pointed crest with a superficial scimitar-shape, formed by the nasal and prefrontal bones. This crest curves posterodorsally (upward and toward the rear). A network of vessels, in addition to longitudinal and crisscrossing striations and grooves, covers this crest, comparable to the condition seen in modern birds with bony crests, such as cassowaries, the helmeted guinea fowl, and the maleo. In these animals, the bone is encased in a keratinous sheath that significantly expands its size. In addition to the prominent dorsal (back) and caudal (tail) sails, the cranial crest likely functioned primarily for visual communication and display.

== Classification ==
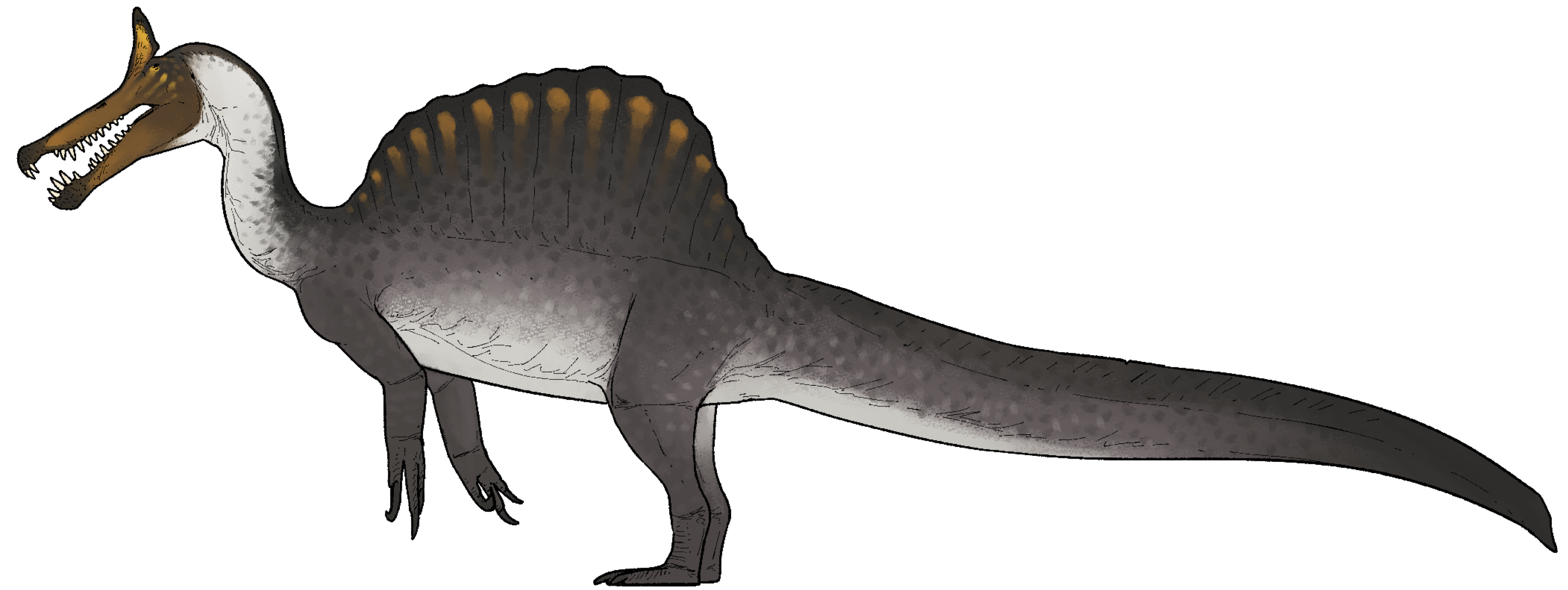
Speculative life restoration

To test the relationships and affinities of Spinosaurus mirabilis, Sereno and colleagues included it in an updated version of the phylogenetic matrix published by Sereno et al. (2022). They consistently recovered the Nigerian taxon as the sister group to the better-known Spinosaurus aegyptiacus, supporting their assignment to the same genus. The results of their Bayesian analysis are shown below:

- Spinosauridae
  - Camarillasaurus cirugedae
  - - Baryonychinae
      - Riojavenatrix lacustris
      - - - Suchomimus tenerensis
          - - Ceratosuchops inferodios
            - Sao Khua Fm. spinosaurid ('Phuwiang spinosaurid B')
        - - Baryonyx walkeri
          - - Iberospinus natarioi
            - Protathlitis cinctorrensis
    - Spinosaurinae
      - Ichthyovenator laosensis
      - - - Vallibonavenatrix cani
          - Khok Kruat Fm. spinosaurid (SM-KK14)
        - - Irritator challengeri
          - Spinosaurini
            - Oxalaia quilombensis
            - - Undescribed Brazilian spinosaurine (UFMA ITA1)
              - Spinosaurus
                - Spinosaurus aegyptiacus
                - Spinosaurus mirabilis

== Paleoecology ==
The remains of S. mirabilis were unearthed from the Farak Formation, characterized by sandstone and sandy shale, representing a Cenomanian-aged fluvial system. S. mirabilis coexisted with other dinosaurs and crocodylomorphs in the Farak Formation including the carcharodontosaurid theropod Carcharodontosaurus, indeterminate theropod remains previously assigned to Bahariasaurus, the sauropods Rebbachisaurus tamesnensis and Aegyptosaurus, and the possible itasuchid crocodylomorph Fortignathus.
