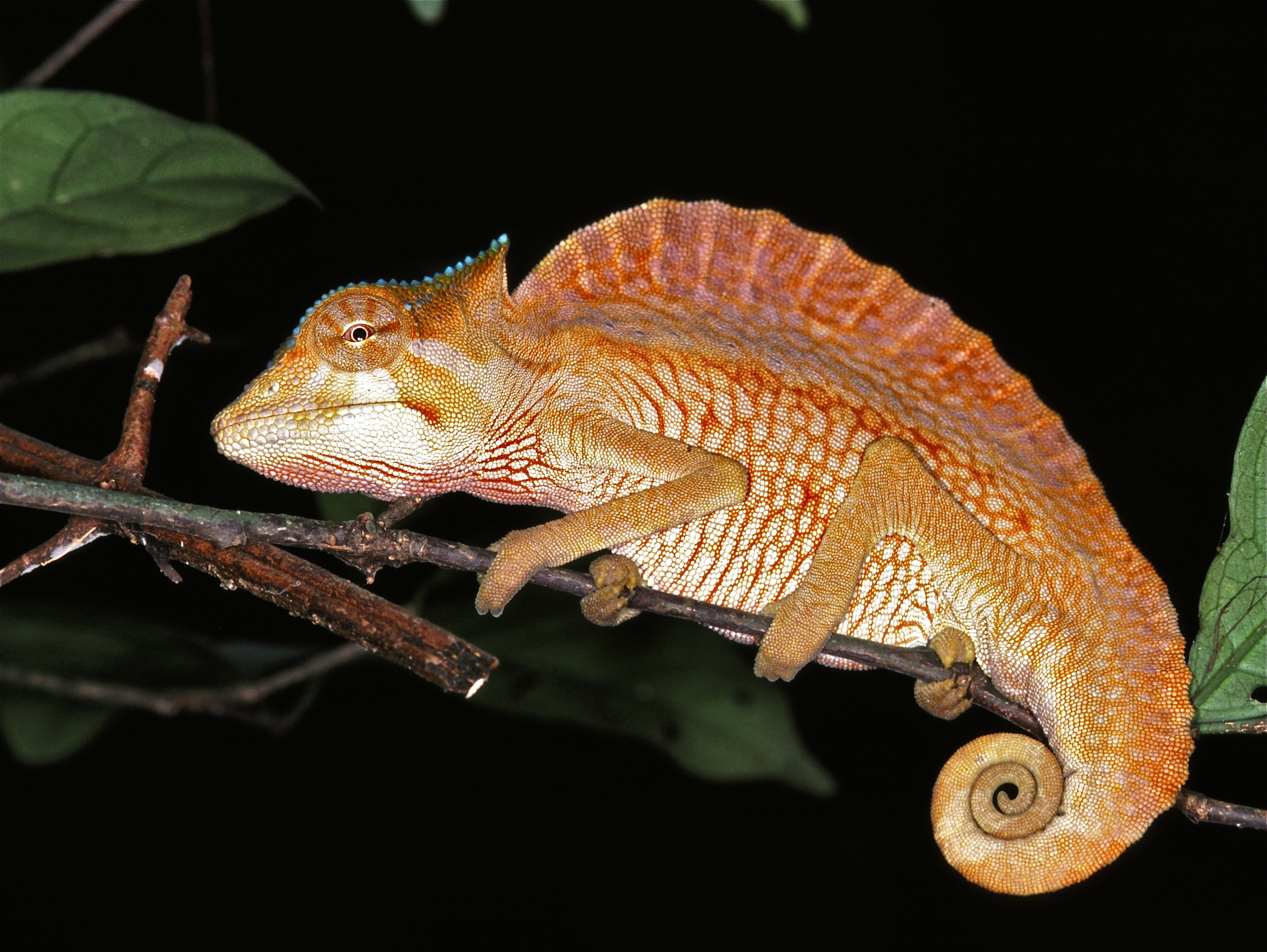

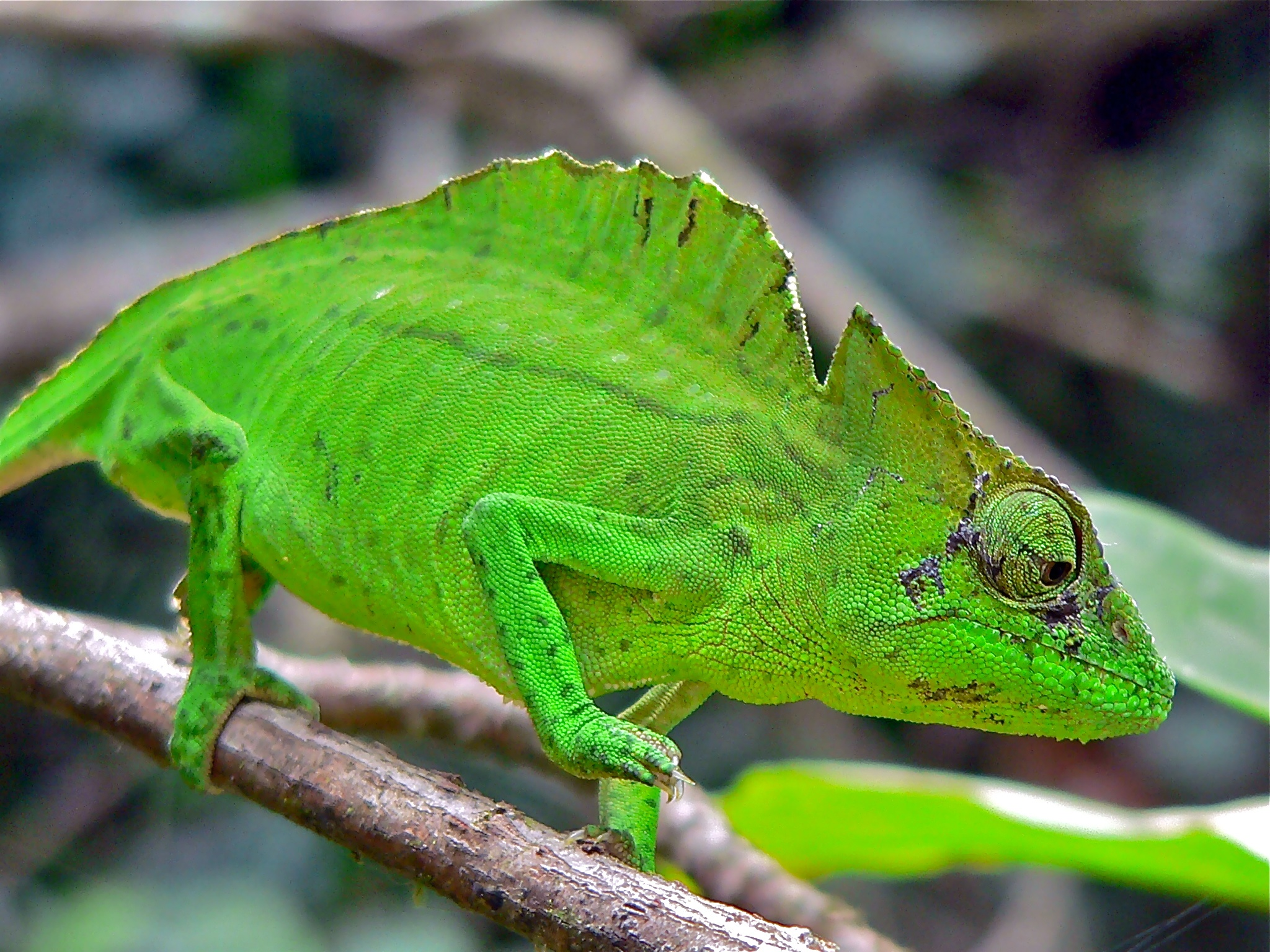

Conservation status
- Least Concern (IUCN 3.1)

Scientific classification
- Kingdom: Animalia
- Phylum: Chordata
- Class: Reptilia
- Order: Squamata
- Suborder: Iguania
- Family: Chamaeleonidae
- Genus: Trioceros
- Species: T. cristatus

Binomial name
- Trioceros cristatus Stutchbury, 1837

= Crested chameleon =

Species of lizard

The crested chameleon (Trioceros cristatus), also known as the sail backed chameleon, is a species of chameleon native to forests and semi-open wooded habitats in Central Africa.

== Taxonomy ==
The crested chameleon was first described as Chamaeleon cristatus by Samuel Stutchbury in 1837. This was the general position in subsequent centuries, although the genus name was corrected to Chamaeleo. In 1986, Klaver and Böhme recognized several subgenera of Chamaeleon, placing it in the subgenus Trioceros as Chamaeleo (Trioceros) cristatus. In 2009, Trioceros was elevated to full genus status by Tilbury and Tolley and it became Trioceros cristatus.

== Distribution and habitat ==
The crested chameleon is restricted to Central Africa, where it can be found in Equatorial Guinea (including the island of Bioko), Cameroon, the Central African Republic, the Democratic Republic of the Congo, the Republic of the Congo, Gabon, Nigeria, Ghana and Togo. The type locality is Gabon.

The crested chameleon is found at an altitude between 10 and 900 metres (33 and 2,953 feet) above mean sea level, and it inhabits forests (including secondary forests), forest-savanna mosaics and farmland.

== Description ==
The female is larger than the male. The typical total length of a female is about 28 cm (11 in), and the typical total for a male is about 25 cm (9.8 in). Females lay between 11 and 14 eggs, although a clutch of 37 was once found.

== Conservation status ==
There is widespread and ongoing habitat degradation in the range of the crested chameleon, but to some degree it is able to withstand this and it also occurs in disturbed habitats. The species is sometimes collected for the pet trade and some local population may have declined because of this. Overall, the crested chameleon is widespread with a range that covers more than 1,000,000 square kilometres (390,000 square miles) and it is unlikely to be undergoing a significant decline. The IUCN do not regard it as a threatened species and have classified it as Least Concern.
