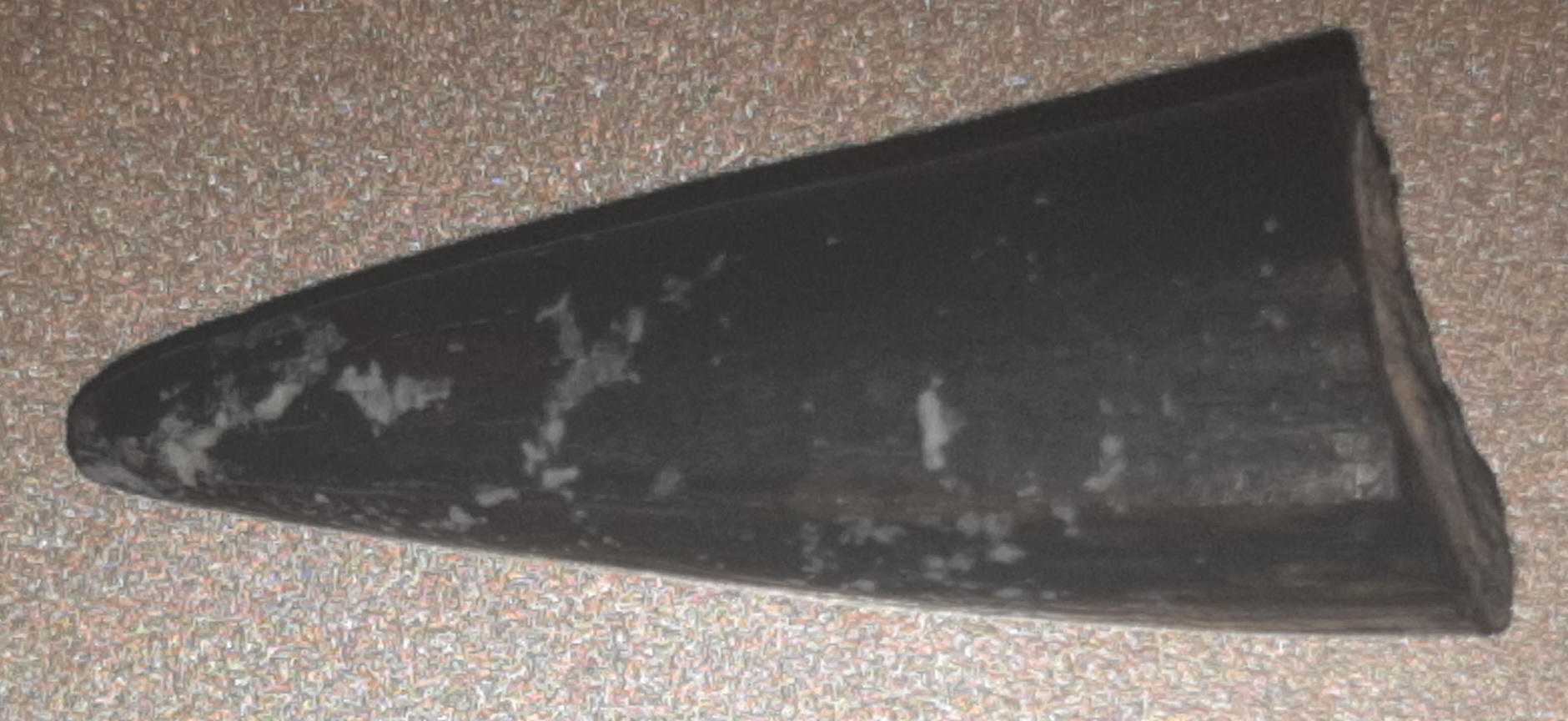
- Tooth of S. lapparenti from the Ténéré Desert, Niger

Scientific classification
- Kingdom: Animalia
- Phylum: Chordata
- Class: Reptilia
- Clade: Pseudosuchia
- Clade: Crocodylomorpha
- Clade: Metasuchia
- Genus: †Stolokrosuchus; Larsson and Gado, 2000

Type species
- †Stolokrosuchus lapparenti Larsson and Gado, 2000

= Stolokrosuchus =

Stolokrosuchus Temporal range: Early Cretaceous, Aptian–Albian

Extinct genus of reptiles

Stolokrosuchus is an extinct genus of crocodyliforms found in the Lower Cretaceous Elrhaz Formation, Niger. It is known from a nearly complete skull displaying a narrow, highly elongated and tubular snout similar to modern gharials. The classification of Stolokrosuchus has been a matter of debate, it was originally considered to be a member of the family Peirosauridae, but later studies also recovered it as possibly closely related to mahajangasuchids or more recently as a member of the family Itasuchidae. While all of these placements would classify Stolokrosuchus as a notosuchian, other studies have proposed a closer relationship to Neosuchia, although these results have been considered to be possibly influenced by its elongated snout. Stolokrosuchus is thought to have been a semi-aquatic animal like modern crocodiles and may have fed on fish and other agile prey present in the waterways of the Paleo-Tegama River System. The type and only known species is S. lapparenti.

== History and naming ==
Stolokrosuchus was described in 2000 by Hans Larsson and Boubacar Gado on the basis of the holotype specimen MNN GDF600, an almost complete skull, alongside a right angular found alongside the skull and a left mandible found not far from the other material. The fossils come from the GAD 5 site of the Aptian to Albian Elrhaz Formation in Niger. The same site has later also yielded the remains of isolated teeth assigned to Stolokrosuchus.

The name Stolokrosuchus derives from the Greek African word "stolokros", which describes the undeveloped horns of juvenile goats that resemble the protuberances on the prefrontal of Stolokrosuchus. The second part of the genus name, "suchus", is a commonly used suffix among fossil crocodyliforms and derives from the ancient Egyptian god Sobek, typically depicted as a human with the head of a crocodile. The species name "lapparenti" comes from French paleontologist Albert-Félix de Lapparent, who was chosen as the species' namesake for his work on Cretaceous vertebrates from West Africa.

== Description ==
The skull of Stolokrosuchus is triangular in dorsal view, tubular and longirostrine, meaning it is both highly elongated and narrow, with a smooth transition from the rostrum to the temporal region. Additionally the skull is described as growing gradually taller towards the back of the head.

The nares face anterodorsolaterally, opening simultaneously somewhat forward, upward and towards the sides; and are divided by a thin septum formed by the paired nasal bones that extend forward and join with a posterior projection of the premaxillae to form a septum. The nares are furthermore surrouned by an anterodorsdal perinarial fossa visible from the side, though unlike in Pepesuchus the fossa lacks a bulge. While the premaxillae extend back by a fair distance, the majority of the rostrum's length is composed of the maxillae. Looking at the skull from above shows a marked transition between the two elements, with the premaxilla expanding prominently before leading into the much narrower anterior maxillary contribution to the rostrum. Pinheiro and colleagues describe ventral margins as remaining straight throughout the rostral length, setting Stolokrosuchus apart from most peirosaurids and itasuchids as well as mahajangasuchids and sebecids, though Geroto and Bertini note it to be slightly festooned. The nasals also contribute significantly to the rostrum, extending along the length and forming the dorsal surface until their contact with the lacrimal, prefrontal and frontal bone. Despite their notable contribution to the rostrum in top view, the almost uniformly wide nasals are barely visible when looking at the skull from the side. While many itasuchids have a nasal that is poseriorly split into distinct processes by the frontal, this is not the case in Stolokrosuchus, in which the posterior edge of the nasals is described as straight. Similarly, the nasals do not form posterior processes that extend into the space between the prefrontal and lacrimals

The narrow prefrontals extend beyond the anterior tip of the frontal and each bears a small protuberance that gives Stolokrosuchus its name, located just anterior to the dorsolaterally oriented eyesockets. Stolokrosuchus preserves a small, slit-like antorbital fenestra that is primarily formed by the lacrimal and surrounded by a shallow and smooth-surfaced fossa. The distance between the antorbital fenestra and the eyesocket is noted as being longer than in other peirosaurids, a feature shared with Epoidesuchus and Hamadasuchus. Only the anterior-most margin of the fenestra is not formed by the lacrimal and instead composed of the maxilla, which has a broad contact with the lacrimal. The flat skull table bears a pair of small subcircular supratemporal fenestra, with the contact between frontal and parietal bone being located at the anterior edge of these openings. The posterior edge of the parietal is described as depressed like in Hamadasuchus and Rukwasuchus. The postorbitals form the anterior edges of the skull table while the squamosals form the posterior corner, though the latter extend beneath the dorsal surface of the postorbitals until almost reaching the orbital margin. The supraoccipital bone is not exposed on the dorsal surface of the skull table alone.

The postorbital also contributes to the robust and cylindrical or rod-shaped postorbital bar together with the jugal, which separates the eye socket from the subtriangular infratemporal fenestra. The jugal's ascending process overlaps the descending process of the postorbital bone on the bar and the entire element is slightly inset relative to the lateral surfaces of its contributing bones. Like in Pepesuchus and some neosuchians the jugal is noted for its rostral extent, with its front-most tip extending further anterior than the prefrontal bone, and even surpassing the anterior end of the antorbital fenestra. The anterior ramus broadens into a rhomboid shape beginning just lateral to the postorbital bar.

The anatomy of the meatal chamber, which together with the overlying earflaps forms the outer ear in crocodyliforms, corresponds to the "basal notosuchian/sebecian pattern" established by Montefeltro and colleagues. This morphology is widespread among basal metasuchians and forms the basis of the ear anatomy also seen in modern crocodilians. Stolokrosuchus, like Pepesuchus, has been noted for possessing a less dorsoventrally expanded meatal chamber due to the reduced descending process of the postorbital and the reduced anterolateral process of the quadratojugal while the squamosal, due to its greater anterior extent, reaches the anterior edge of the chamber. While both taxa retain the bony otic aperture, one of two structures present within the chamber, both Stolokrosuchus and Pepesuchus lack the subtympanic foramen like is also the case in modern gharials but not in other extant crocodilians.

The craniomandibular joint is formed not only by the quadrate bones but also by the quadratojugals, though the latter's contribution, like in most itasuchids, is comparably minute. The quadrate bone bears a robust dorsal projection between its hemicondyles and is firmly sutured to the braincase and the pterygoid bone but not the laterosphenoid. The tightly sutured braincase features a vertically expanded parasphenoid that is confluent with the pterygoids and a basisphenoid that is almost invisible in ventral view as it is obscured by both the pterygoids and the basioccipital. The otoccipitals are large and short and participate in closing the craniquadrate canal against the quadrates to their sides and form large bosses located towards the basioccipital tubera.

Ventrally the incisive foramen is described as elongated and its anterior edge contacts the toothrow. The opening is mostly surrounded by the ventral surface of the premaxillae except for the posterior-most edge, which is formed by an anterior process of the maxillae that divides the premaxilla. and overlaps the vomer. The palatine bones in turn form long and pointed processes that extend into the space between the ventral surfaces of the maxillae and posteriorly form the space between the two suborbital fenestrae. The descending process of the prefrontal is also noted to come into firm contact with the palatines. The posterior margin of the choanae is formed by a deep vertical pocket formed by the fused pterygoid bones which furthermore form a thin lamina that bisects the choanal opening. The pterygoid extends ventrally to form a tall shelf alongside the basisphenoid, which comes into contact with the foramen for the median eustachian canal. The ectopterygoid contacts the postorbital bar laterally and the maxilla anteriorly, though the latter contact sits well behind the end of the toothrow. The ventral surface of the quadrate bears two elongated crests regarded to be attachment sites for the adductor musculature, designated crests A and B. Crest A runs parallel to the lateral edge of the quadrate from the ventral margin of the adductor chamber to the midpoint of the bone, while crest B is located medially and continues on from a dorsal process of the pterygoid onto the quadrate's pterygoid process. The presence and relationship between these crests is also seen in other peirosaurids as well as Araripesuchus.

=== Mandible ===
The flattened mandibular symphysis of Stolokrosuchus is narrow to match the narrow elongated rostrum, lacks a constriction and is formed by both the dentary bones and the splenials, which meet along a V-shaped suture. The dentaries and splenials remain in contact across the mandibular ramus, but their suture only runs parallel to the toothrow at the level of the 25th dentary tooth. The splenial's contribution to the width of the mandibular ramus is comparable to taxa like Gasparinisuchus and Barrosasuchus, making up about 25-30 % of the mandible's entire mediolateral width. Like in numerous peirosaurids Stolokrosuchus preserves an elongated groove that runs parallel to the toothrow along the outer surface of the mandible. Among peirosaurds there is some variation regarding whether or not the space between this groove and the toothrow shares the same sculpting as the remainder of the mandible. While the region is smooth in Stolokrosuchus like in Pepesuchus and Hamadasuchus, among others, it has been noted that the remainder of the mandible is likewise unornamented The dorsal surface of the mandible is straight rather than festooned, meaning that the lower jaw of Stolokrosuchus lacked the wave-like or sinusoidal profile seen in most peirosaurids.

=== Dentition ===
The upper jaw of Stolokrosuchus contains a total of 30 teeth on either side, 5 in each premaxilla and an additional 25 in each maxilla. The first two premaxillary teeth are small and closely spaced to the point of almost being confluent while the subsequent three teeth are larger and better separated from each other. Overall these teeth follow the curvature of the premaxilla and are not positioned in a straight line like the first few premaxillary teeth of the neosuchian Elosuchus. The first two teeth of the maxilla project slightly forward and after this point the toothrow exhibits slight festooning, with the maxillary teeth reaching their greatest size with the fifth and 13th teeth.

The tooth count of the mandible is similarly high as that of the upper jaw, containing a minimum of 30 teeth, with 26 of them all located on the mandibular symphysis. While in most other peirosaurids the fourth dentary tooth is the largest in the mandible, in Stolokrosuchus the first dentary tooth is the largest. Filippi and colleagues furthermore describe that the following teeth are roughly subequal in size throughout the lower jaw while Nicholl and colleagues indicate that the dentary teeth grow progressively larger towards the back of the skull. While most dentary teeth sit in individual alveoli, the 12th and 13th as well as 14th to 17th are confluent with each other.

The individual premaxillary teeth are described as conical while those of the maxilla are conical with some slight labiolingual (side-by-side) compression. Towards the back of the toothrow the maxillary teeth grow smaller and blunter. Like in the possibly related Epoidesuchus the carinae or cutting edges of Stolokrosuchus teeth are smooth and bear neither crenulations nor serrations as is frequently the case in both itasuchids and peirosaurids. Isolated teeth assigned to Stolokrosuchus do however show clearly visible striations running vertically from the base to the apex.

France de Lapparent de Broin has suggested that the fourth and 15th dentary teeth may have interlocked with the dentition of the upper jaw while other parts of the toothrow show an overbite.

=== Size ===
The skull of Stolokrosuchus measures 481 mm (18.9 in) in length and the animal may have weighed around 230 kg (510 lb) based on calculations by Bravo and colleagues.

== Phylogeny ==
=== As a notosuchian ===
The relationship between Stolokrosuchus and other crocodyliforms has historically been debated and it has been recovered in at times very distant position. Larsson and Gado initially described Stolokrosuchus as a member of the Peirosauridae in an unresolved sister taxon relationship with Peirosaurus and Lomasuchus. At that time the family was found as being more closely related to eusuchians than they are typically recovered to be today, having been placed between goniopholidids and the clade formed by Crocodylia and Bernissartia. Since the initial description in 2000, Peirosauridae has been recognized as falling within the clade Notosuchia, generally as closely related to Mahajangasuchidae and Uruguaysuchidae. In 2014 Sertich and colleagues also recovered Stolokrosuchus as a peirosaurid, specifically as a derived member closely related to other African forms like Rukwasuchus and Hamadasuchus. A more recent paper to recover Stolokrosuchus as a peirosaurid is the 2021 description of Antaeusuchus. Under equal weighting of phylogenetic characters, this study's analysis recovers Stolokrosuchus as the earliest diverging member of a much more diverse iteration of Peirosauridae compared to its state in 2000.

- Notosuchia
  - - Uruguaysuchidae
    - - Mahajangasuchidae
        - Kaprosuchus
        - Mahajangasuchus
      - Peirosauridae
        - Stolokrosuchus
        - - - Bayomesasuchus
            - - Hamadasuchus
              - Antaeusuchus
          - - - Miadanasuchus
              - Barrosasuchus
            - - Gasparinisuchus
              - Rukwasuchus
              - - Uberabasuchus
                - - Lomasuchus
                  - Montealtosuchus
  - - Candidodon
    - Ziphosuchia

Other studies meanwhile have suggested that Stolokrosuchus, while nonetheless close to peirosaurids, might be better placed in other families within Notosuchia. For instance, in a 2012 study Bronzati and colleagues regarded Stolokrosuchus with close affinities to not just peirosaurids but also mahajangasuchids and the now dubious clade Trematochampsidae, though their study did not place this grouping within Notosuchia but as a clade basal to Neosuchia. Another tree that does not recover Stolokrosuchus as a member of the traditional oreinorostrine peirosaurids is one of the phylogenitic analysis by Wilberg, Turner and Brochu from 2019. In this study several analyses suggested a close link between Stolokrosuchus and the semi-aquatic notosuchian clade Mahajangasuchidae, which is composed of Mahajangasuchus and Kaprosuchus. However Stolokrosuchus was not placed in the family itself, which more broadly speaking appeared to represent an early off-shoot of Notosuchia closely related with peirosaurids. Somewhat similar results have since then also been recovered in one of the phylogenetic analysis by Nicholl and colleagues in 2021. While the phylogenetic tree using equal weighting of characters recovered Stolokrosuchus as a basal peirosaurid, extended implied weighting suggested closer affinities with mahajangasuchids just as in Wilberg's paper. More specifically, in this tree mahajangasuchids were recovered as the earliest-diverging branch of Peirosauridae rather than an independent family and Stolokrosuchus was found to be basal to this clade, although once again not atually part of it. Furthermore, the genus Lorosuchus, originally described as a sebecid, was positioned closer to actual mahajangasuchids than Stolokrosuchus.

- Notosuchia
  - - Uruguaysuchidae
    - Peirosauridae
      - - Stolokrosuchus
        - - Lorosuchus
          - Mahajangasuchidae
            - Mahajangasuchus
            - Kaprosuchus
      - - - Bayomesasuchus
          - - Hamadasuchus
            - Antaeusuchus
        - - - Miadanasuchus
            - Barrosasuchus
          - - Uberabasuchus
            - Lomasuchus
            - Montealtosuchus
            - Rukwasuchus
            - Gasparinisuchus
  - - Candidodon
    - - Libycosuchus
      - Ziphosuchia

A third position within Notosuchia that has been especially favored in some more recent papers is one closely allied with the narrow-snouted members of the family Itasuchidae, which although originally established in the early 2000s was not widely recognized until the late 2020s following a redefinition by Pinheiro and colleagues in 2018. In this study, which chiefly dealt with the redescription of "Goniopholis" paulistanus as Roxochampsa, the team established Itasuchidae as a clade basal to peirosaurids, mahajangasuchids and sebecids. While Stolokrosuchus was not included in the family itself due to the clade's new definition provided by the team, Stolokrosuchus was nevertheless regarded as a close relative. In a 2023 paper describing additional material for multiple itasuchids Pinheiro and colleagues managed to recover a similar topology, but now included Stolokrosuchus as the basalmost itasuchid and included it in the clades definition. This was later supported by both Wilberg et al. 2025 and Iori et al. 2025, who recovered nearly identical phylogenetic trees which concerning Itasuchidae were only differentiated by the inclusion of new taxa in the latter study. In both Stolokrosuchus was found as one of the basalmost member of the clade similar to its position in Pinheiro's work.

Parallel to the revised definition of Itasuchidae by Pinheiro and colleagues, Geroto and Bertini coined the name Pepesuchinae for a grouping that overlapped with Itasuchidae in its contents but was established as a subfamily of Peirosauridae rather than an indepdenent, closely-associated family. In this study Geroto and Bertini noted that based on the mix of rostral and cranial features Stolokrosuchus may represent a transitional form between terrestrial peirosaurids and semi-aquatic pepesuchines. Later work essentially showed that Itasuchidae and Pepesuchinae were indistinguishable, with the 2024 study by Ruiz and colleagues using the name Pepesuchinae but recovering the same results as would later be found by the teams of Wilberg and Iori.

Ruiz et al. (2024)

- - Notosuchia
    - Eunotosuchia
    - Sebecia
      - Doratodon carcharidens
      - - Mahajangasuchidae
        - - Sebecidae
          - Peirosauridae
            - Peirosaurinae
            - Pepesuchinae
              - Kinesuchus
              - - Stolokrosuchus
                - - Rukwasuchus
                  - - Epoidesuchus
                    - - Barreirosuchus
                      - - Pepesuchus
                        - - Amargasuchus
                          - Caririsuchus
                          - Itasuchus
                          - Roxochampsa

Wilberg et al. (2025)

- - Doratodon
  - - Mahajangasuchidae
    - - Sebecidae
      - - Peirosauridae
        - Itasuchidae
          - Kinesuchus
          - - Stolokrosuchus
            - - Rukwasuchus
              - - Epoidesuchus
                - - - Sissokosuchus
                    - Barreirosuchus
                  - - Pepesuchus
                    - - Caririsuchus
                      - Itasuchus
                      - Amargasuchus
                      - Roxochampsa

=== As a neosuchian ===
While most studies generally recover Stolokrosuchus as a member of Notosuchia, some select few propose that it was instead more closely connected to Neosuchia, the clade that includes most semi-aquatic crocodylomorphs from the Mesozoic as well as today's crocodiles. In 2002 France de Lapparent de Broin placed Stolokrosuchus in the newly established family Elosuchidae alongside the eponymous genus Elosuchus, a longirostrine genus from the Cretaceous of Africa, based on a variety of features often only hypothesized for Stolokrosuchus or stated to be "possibly shared". This relationship was however generally disputed by subsequent studies. Jouve and colleagues highlighted that Stolokrosuchus lacked many features defining the family in a 2005 study, a mindset widely accepted by later works, and Turner and Sertich recovered it as the sister taxon to all neosuchians.

In 2011 Andrade and colleagues proposed a new definition of Elosuchidae and instead recovered Stolokrosuchus as a basal offshoot of a clade that includes goniopholidids, elosuchids (including Sarcosuchus) and the marine thalattosuchians. As a whole this grouping was found as the sister clade to modern crocodylians, Bernissartia and hylaeochampsids. Meunier and Larsson recovered similar results in their 2017 revision of Elosuchus, which they placed in the family Pholidosauridae rather than retaining Elosuchidae. Regarding Stolokrosuchus the study differing in shifting the genus to a slightly more basal position in a polytomy with the clade leading up to modern crocodiles and Tethysuchia (consisting of dyrosaurids, goniopholidids and pholidosaurids).

- Metasuchia
  - - Ziphosuchia
      - Sebecia
      - Notosuchia
    - - Anatosuchus
      - - Kaprosuchus
        - Mahajangasuchus
  - Neosuchia
    - Theriosuchus
    - - Stolokrosuchus
      - - Goniopholididae
        - Tethysuchia
      - - Rugosuchus
        - - Bernissartia
          - Eusuchia
            - - Isisfordia
              - Susisuchus
            - - - Allodaposuchus
                - - Iharkutosuchus
                  - Hylaeochampsa
              - Crown Crocodylia

Despite recovering Stolokrosuchus as a neosuchian in prior studies, by 2014 Sertich and colleagues argue that this pattern may be due to the absence of important parts of the palate in the holotype as well as the convergently evolved longirostrine skull form. This would suggest that while Stolokrosuchus does share features with neosuchians, these traits are merely a side-effect of both groups independently acquiring similarly shaped heads and that the shared features are functional in nature.

== Paleobiology ==
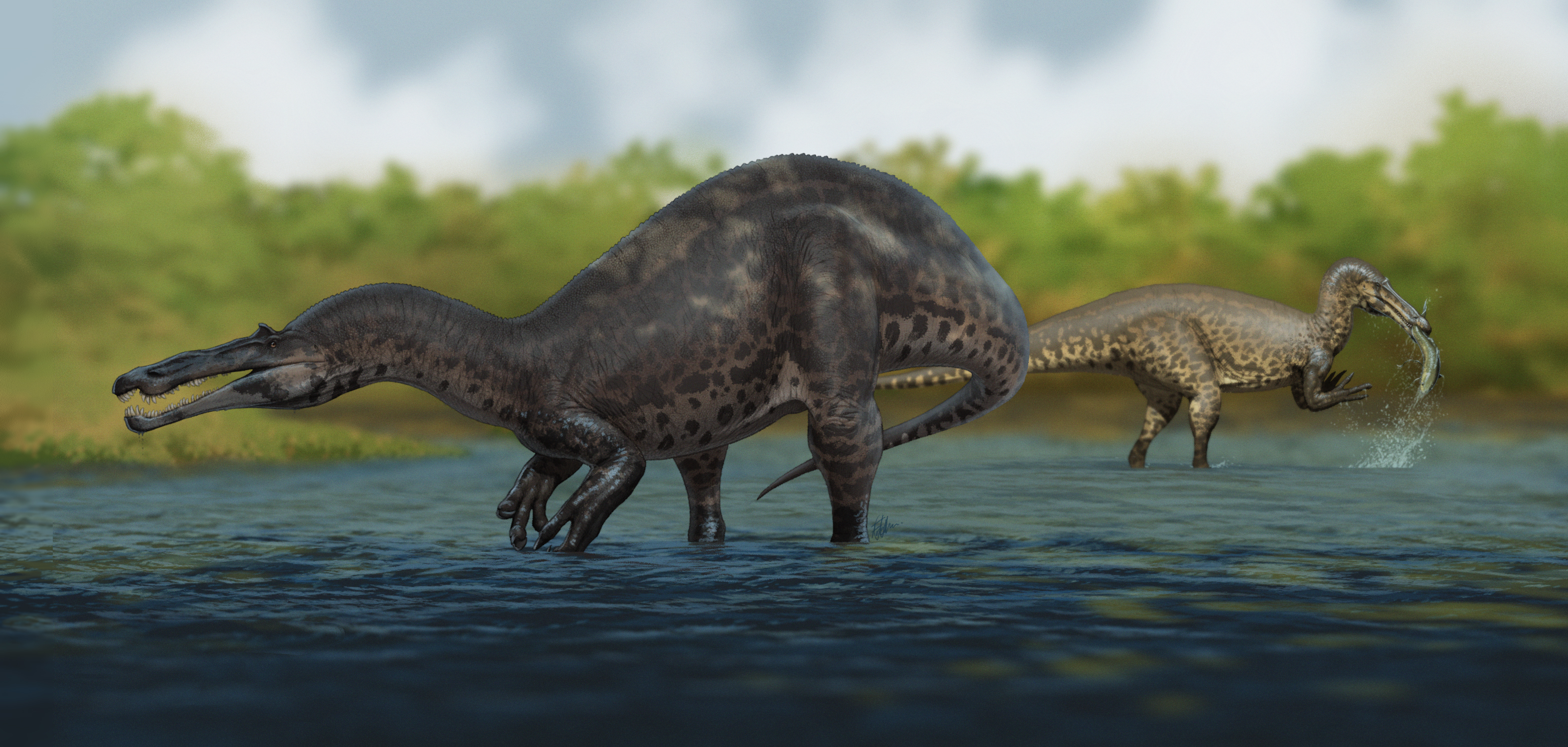
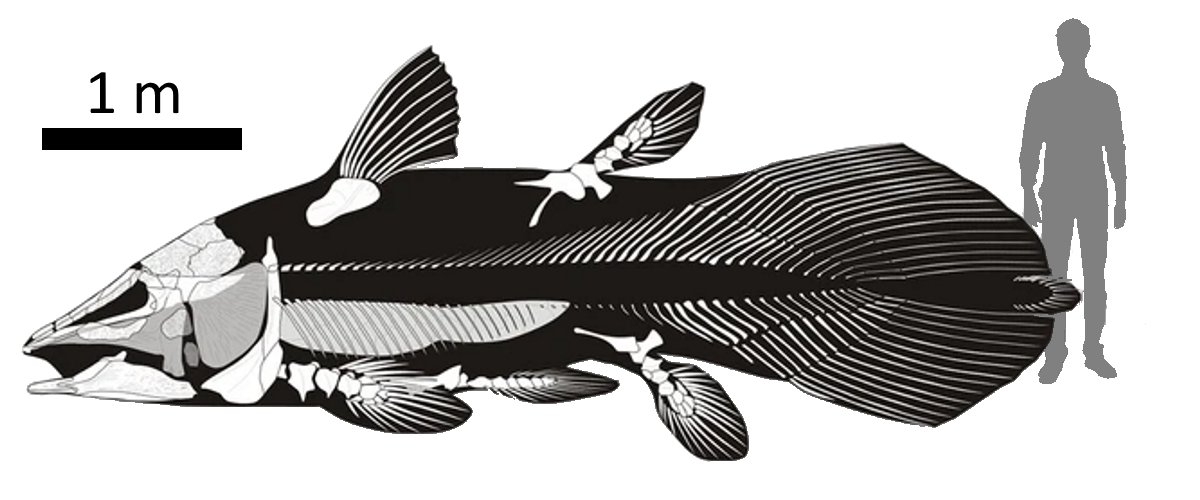
Stolokrosuchus inhabited the waterways of the Paleo-Tegama River System, which was also home to the spinosaurid Suchomimus and the giant coelacanth Mawsonia.

Stolokrosuchus is frequently regarded as a semi-aquatic taxon on account of features such its longirostrine tubular snout and more dorsally oriented eyes. With its long and narrow jaws it might have fed on agile prey such as fish. The anatomy of the outer ear appears to fall in line with the pattern seen in other basal notosuchians while establishing features further developed by neosuchians including modern crocodiles. Notably, Stolokrosuchus, like Pepesuchus and modern gharials, lacks the subtympanic foramen, which in modern crocodiles is thought to serve a resonant function and is especially well developed in the terrestrial baurusuchids, which possess multiple foramen per meatal chamber. The reduction of the foramen may be associated with the closing of outer ear to protect the tympanic membrane while submerged under water and a further reduction in the resonance properties of the outer ear.

The only known remains of Stolokrosuchus come from Gadoufaoua, specifically deposits belonging of the Aptian to Albian Elrhaz Formation (upper Tegama Group) in what is now Niger. In a study on the microvertebrate fauna of Gadoufaoua, Pochat-Cottilloux and colleagues note that the majority of remains belong to aquatic fauna (only 13% of fossil remains belong to terrestrial animals), with some euryhaline and others known to have exclusively inhabited freshwater. While the macrofauna suggests a floodplain environment, the fact that microfossils were found isolated and scattered instead favors a more dynamic fluvial environment like river channels. However it is also noted by the team that these two are not necessarily contradictory, as they may simply represent different parts of a greater ecosystem. Wilberg and colleagues have proposed that the Tegama Group including the Elhrhaz Formation was once part of a transcontinental river system, dubbed by them the Paleo-Tegama River System, which flowed northward out of Niger and through the "Continental Intercalaire" of Mali before emptying into the Tethys Sea. Evidence suggests that the Paleo-Tegama River System was extensive and productive, likely having been fed by a number of tributaries and able to support a diverse fauna including many species closely associated with freshwater such as numerous semi-aquatic crocodylomorphs and spinosaurids like Suchomimus.

Other dinosaurs from the formation include the abelisauroids Kryptops and Afromimus, the sauropod Nigersaurus and several ornithopods including Ouranosaurus and Lurdusaurus. The crocodylomorph fauna from Gadoufaoua includes both terrestrial notosuchians such as Anatosuchus minor and Araripesuchus wegeneri as well as the large, semi-aquatic neosuchian Sarcosuchus imperator. The waterways of the Elrhaz Formation were further inhabited by the hybodont Tribodus, amiiform, pycnodontiform and ichthyodectiform ray-finned fish, sarcopterygians such as Mawsonia and Ptychoceratodus as well as frogs and freshwater turtles.
