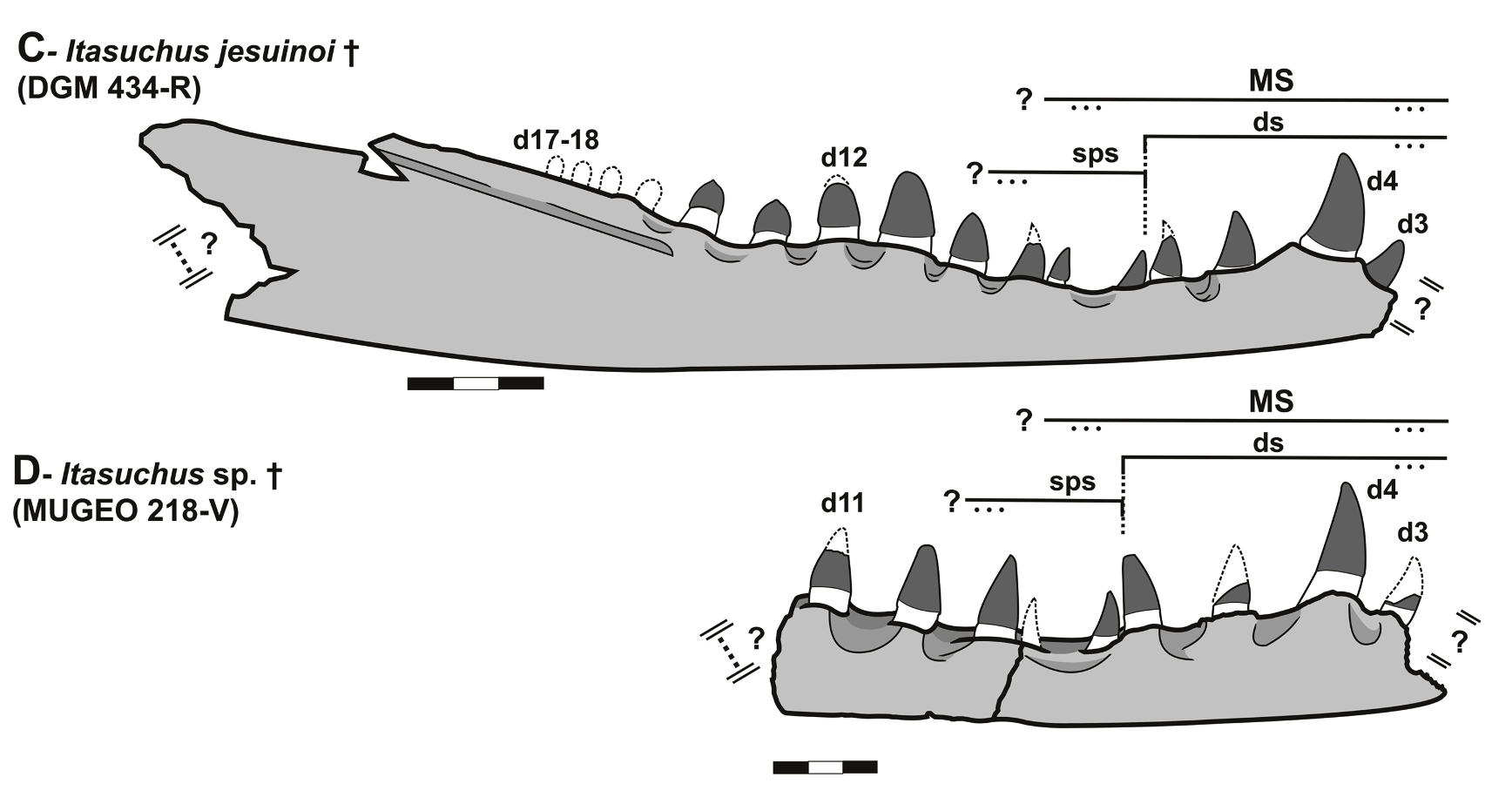
- Mandibular remains of Itasuchus jesuinoi

Scientific classification
- Kingdom: Animalia
- Phylum: Chordata
- Class: Reptilia
- Clade: Pseudosuchia
- Clade: Crocodylomorpha
- Clade: †Notosuchia
- Family: †Itasuchidae
- Genus: †Itasuchus; Price, 1955

Type species
- †Itasuchus jesuinoi Price, 1955

= Itasuchus =

Itasuchus Temporal range: Late Cretaceous, Campanian–Maastrichtian

Extinct genus of reptiles

Itasuchus is an extinct genus of itasuchid notosuchian from the Late Cretaceous of Brazil. Fossils of the type species I. jesuinoi, first described in 1955 by Llewellyn Ivor Price, have been found from the Serra da Galga Formation, though later finds also support its presence in the sediments of the Presidente Prudente Formation. It possessed a somewhat elongated and flattened snout with interlocking teeth similar to what is seen in modern crocodilians, a thick osteoderm armor potentially covered by a thick layer of leathery skin and has been estimated to have reached a total body length of 2–2.5 m (6 ft 7 in – 8 ft 2 in).

Itasuchus is the namesake of the family Itasuchidae, established in 2004 to accommodate both it and Malawisuchus after Itasuchus has varyingly been regarded a goniopholidid and trematochampsid throughout the 1900s. Itasuchidae did not see widespread use at first until the clade was redefined by Pinheiro and colleagues in 2018 to include other similarly platyrostral peirosaurians like Roxochampsa and Pepesuchus, though that same year the same forms had also been used to establish the clade Pepesuchinae. It is now frequently thought that regardless of the nomenclature, Itasuchus and its relatives were close kin to the Peirosauridae within the clade Notosuchia.

Itasuchus inhabitet the meandering river systems of the Presidente Prudente and Serra da Galga Formation during the late Campanian and early Maastrichtian, an environment shared with the closely related Roxochampsa, non-itasuchid notosuchians, turtles, various fish, abelisaurid theropods and titanosaur sauropods. Like other itasuchids Itasuchus too is thought to have been a semi-aquatic animal, a hypothesis supported in part due to the overall similarities to modern crocodiles. This is supported by the laterally flattened tail and keeled osteoderms, which may have been a factor in making the animal more hydrodynamic. The overall snout proportions have been described as an intermediate between longirostrine and brevirostrine forms and have been specifically likened to modern nile crocodiles.

== History and naming ==
Itasuchus was named by Brazilian paleontologist Llewellyn Ivor Price in 1955 based on fossil material recovered near Peirópolis in sediments of the Late Cretaceous (Early Maastrichtian) Bauru Group, specifically the Serra da Galga Member of the Marília Formation, which in some works has been elevated to full formation status. The original material, designated the specimen number DGM 434-R, consisted of a fairly complete lower jaw, parts of the left skull from the posterior maxilla to the quadrate, four vertebrae each of the neck, torso and tail, 20 osteoderms and other well preserved postcrania including some complete limb bones. The description of the genus, which was published in the same study as that of Peirosaurus, was chiefly based on the cranial remains, which were deemed sufficient for establishing a new genus by Price. Though mentioned, and despite having been regarded as one of the best known mesoeucrocodylian skeletons from its locality, the postcrania were neither described in detail nor figured, with Price promising that the material would be dealt with "in due course".

The late 80s saw the discovery and eventual description of a complete, well-preserved semi-aquatic crocodyliform from Brazil's Araripe Basin that closely resembled Itasuchus. This form, named Caririsuchus by Brazilian paleontologist Alexander Kellner, was eventually removed from Brazil and was next mentioned as having been shipped to Europe, where it was briefly examined by Eric Buffetaut. While maintaining the status of Caririsuchus as a distinct species, Buffetaut noted several similarities to Itasuchus, ultimately regarding Caririsuchus camposi a species of Itasuchus, creating the combination Itasuchus camposi. The fossil material once again vanished after this, presumably having been sold to a private collector. Despite Buffetaut's proposal, subsequent papers generally kept Itasuchus and Caririsuchus as distinct genera.

In 2004 Carvalho and colleagues established the family Itasuchidae to include both Itasuchus and Malawisuchus, but this grouping was not widely recovered in subsequent studies and generally fell out of use until 2018 when it was redefined to include several platyrostral forms similar to Itasuchus. Since the paper recovered all members of the newly revised Itasuchidae in a polytomy, Pinheiro and colleagues mentioned that it would be possible to sink all four taxa into the genus Itasuchus, but ultimately retained all four forms as distinct genera.

By 2018 a second specimen, MUGEO 218-V, had also been referred to the genus Itasuchus, although only at a genus level. The specimen, represented by a mandible fragment with teeth, is notably less complete than the holotype material and comes from the Late Campanian to Early Maastrichtian Presidente Prudente Formation. A more substantial piece of a rostrum, specimen UFRJ DG 687- R, was eventually also tentatively referred to Itasuchus jesuinoi as well. This specimen, like MUGEO 218-V, came from the Presidente Prudente Formation.

The name Itasuchus derives from the Tupi word "ita" for "stone" and "suchus", the Greek word for "crocodile". The species name derives from Jesuino Felicissimo Junior, who is credited for having reported the first fossils from the site that yielded the remains of Itasuchus.

== Description ==
The cranium of Itasuchus is known from two different specimens, the holotype and a tentatively referred rostrum from a different formation. The holotype preserves mostly the posterolateral parts of a skull, two parts of the maxilla, the jugal, quadratojugal (including the postorbital bar) and the quadrate bone. The tentatively referred rostrum meanwhile preserves both halves of the anterior snout from the external nares backward, but lacks the very tip of the snout. Even prior to the discovery of this specimen, the shape of the lower jaw suggested that the skull of Itasuchus was long, narrow and flat. Price estimated that the skull of Itasuchus was approximately 37 cm (15 in) long, with a mandibular length of up to 43 cm (17 in).

Even with the additional rostral elements, some of the anatomy of Itasuchus remains unclear. The nares open anterodorsally, meaning forward and upward, and were located close to the snout tip. The edges of the nares were not inflated and instead were level with the rest of the surface of the snout. Due to the damage to the specimen it is unclear whether or not there was a prominent process that extended into the opening or even separated them via a septum, though there is evidence for at least a small extension of the premaxillae. The nares are entirely surrounded by the premaxillae, completely preventing any contact with the paired and spear-shaped nasal bones, though the nasals do divide the posterior elements of the premaxillae via their pointed tips. The premaxillae construct abruptly behind the fourth teeth to create a prominent notch for the large fourth dentary tooth. However rather than marking the point of separation between premaxilla and maxilla, the premaxilla extends further backwards even behind the notch. There the premaxilla contacts the maxilla along a V-shaped suture. The maxilla then form most of the rostrum, running along the nasals. Unlike the lower jaw, the bottom margin of the maxilla is almost straight and lacks the distinct sinusoidal contour created by the festooning of the toothrow.

The jugal is elongated with a straight lower edge and an expanded anterior process that is over twice as tall as the posterior part of the bone. The quadratojugal is described as small and does not participate in the articulation for the lower jaw. Instead the quadrate, which flares outward like in modern crocodiles, is entirely responsible for the articulation with the mandible. The infratemporal fenestra is described as large and longer than tall.

The mandible is mostly known from the dentaries, which in the holotype lack teeth in the very front. Price described this part of the lower jaw as "slightly scarred" and considered the possibility that the terminal dentaries were naturally toothless, but conceded that more material was required to be certain. Later studies like that of Pinheiro and colleagues eventually came to disregard this idea, suggesting that at least two pairs of teeth were present in the damaged region. The mandibular symphysis, where the two halves of the lower jaw meet, is described as long, narrow and flat with clear evidence that it was not just formed by the dentaries but also incorporated the splenials. The symphysis has also been described as spatulate, with specific comparison being drawn to Kinesuchus. The dentaries remain connected until the sixth dentary tooth, though Filippi and colleagues later identify the 7th as the end point for the dentary symphysis, while the splenial's contribution to the symphysis stretches until at least the 10th, though the matter is unclear as the splenials themselves aren't actually preserved. Behind the mandibular symphysis the two halves diverge outwards and also grow taller. Overall the lower jaw displays noticeable festooning both dorsoventrally and mediolaterally, meaning that both in top down and sideview the lower jaw has a clear sinusoidal contour, in both instances coinciding with the tooth size. Specifically, the lower jaw is dorsally convex and rather wide around the fourth dentary tooth (the second of the ones preserved in the holotype). The enlarged fourth dentary tooth, which is common among crocodyliforms, is preceded by the rather flat terminal part of the mandible and immediately followed by a concave and narrower section around the position of the 5th and 6th teeth. The dentary rises again and reaches its tallest point at the level of the 11th and 12 teeth, at which point the height of the bone remains consistent. Looking at the lower jaw from the side also shows that the dentary is split towards the back to form the upper and lower margins of the mandibular fenestra. The retroarticular process, formed by the articular bone, is long and curves upwards like in modern crocodiles, but Price has noted that the inner lobe of the articular is comparably more developed in Itasuchus.

Little is known about the incisive foramen other than that it had straight edges and may have been contacted by the anterior of the maxillae, meaning that unlike the nares the incisive foramen was not entirely enclosed by the palatal shelves of the premaxillae. Pinheiro and colleagues note that the contact between the palatal shelves of the premaxillae and maxillae are marked by several striations at approximately the level of the third premaxillary tooth and a few nutrient foramina. The maxillary shelves are further noted to be flat (lacking a parasagittal torus) and form a wide secondary palate with several irregularly placed nutrient foramina close to the tooth sockets.

=== Dentition ===
Based on the tentatively referred rostrum each premaxilla of Itasuchus likely housed five teeth, the third of which being the largest. The preserved elements of the holotype of Itasuchus preserve 11 tooth sockets in the posterior maxillary elements an the referred specimen 6 in the anterior, but the total tooth count of the upper jaw is unknown. The lower jaw is better preserved and likely contained 18 teeth, which includes two that are missing in the holotype. As is common in crocodyliforms, the fourth dentary tooth is the largest in the lower jaw, which is immediately followed by three progressively smaller teeth. It has also been noted that in Itasuchus the toothsocket is encircled by a bony rim similar to those seen in Colhuehuapisuchus. The 11th tooth is noted to be of similar size to the fourth, albeit of more bulbous morphology, and the 12th is likewise enlarged. The anterior alveoli of the lower jaw are described as more circular but becoming oval further back in the jaw. The anterior teeth are described as slender and curved inward, but they grow less curved and blunter further back in the jaw with Geroto and Bertini describing them as almost molariform. The enamel of especially the anterior teeth is covered by coarse, irregular striations that run along the height of the crown and converge towards but stop before actually reaching the tooth apex. These striations are noted to be more pronounced on the lingual (inner) side of the teeth. The teeth also bear anterior and posterior carinae (cutting edges) that are crenulated with false denticles. Towards the back of the jaw the carinae join each other on the apex but the striations are lost, giving these teeth a smoother surface texture.

Overall Itasuchus displays what is generally referred to as a crocodyloid occlusal pattern, meaning that the teeth interlock similar to what is seen in modern crocodiles and unlike in alligators, which have a pronounced overbite. To accommodate for the interlocking teeth, the alveolar margin is interrupted by various short, toothless gaps. Such diastemas for example separate the fourth from the fifth and the fifth from the sixth tooth. The dentary toothrow of Itasuchus also features a distinct pair of couplets that stand out among the remainder of the teeth for their position. While separated from its predecessor by a diastema, the sixth alveolus is actually contiguous with the seventh. Following another diastema a second couplet of contiguous alveoli, the eighth and ninth, is present. Between these couplets the teeth that are closest to each other, seven and eight, are smaller than their partners, creating a pattern where the size ratios within each couplet are the same but in reverse position. The gap between them likely corresponds with the largest tooth of the upper jaw. Further diastemas separate the ninth from the 10th tooth and the 13th from the 14th while smaller gaps and depressions separate the teeth between positions 10 to 13 as well as all teeth posterior to the 14th, at which point the individual teeth also grow smaller. The maxilla also preserves occlusal scars, further showing evidence for the interlocking dentition.

=== Osteoderms ===
The osteoderms are described as large, thick and twice as wide as they are long. The surface is ornamented by small but deep pits, sometimes joining into canals that radiate outward from a keel that runs down each individual plate lengthwise with an outward curvature. In the osteoderms of the torso the keel is placed almost in the middle of each osteoderm, whereas in laterodorsal tail osteoderms the keels are shifted outwards where they are said to form a paddle or oar-like structure with the other osteoderms and the overall laterally flattened form of the tail. The apex of the crest is located closer to the posterior edge of the osteoderm. The anterior surface of each single osteoderm is bevelled, allowing each osteoderm to overlap the one behind it.

Histology of the osteoderms of Itasuchus has further revealed that the sharpey's fibres, which anchor the bony plates to the underlying tissue, were inserted into the external cortex of the bone perpendicular to the outer surface. This is similar to what is seen in at least one baurusuchid, Armadillosuchus, some Triassic pseudosuchians and certain modern turtles, in particular softshell and leatherback sea turtles. Based on this Sena and colleagues have suggested that in life the osteoderms of Itasuchus may have been more deeply embedded than they are in modern crocodilians and could have been covered by a layer of leathery skin.

=== Size ===
The skull of Itasuchus has been estimated to reach a length of approximately 37 cm (15 in) based on the holotype specimen, with the estimate based on the much better preserved lower jaw (itself estimated to have been 43 cm (17 in) in total). Marinho and colleagues suggested that Itasuchus, Peirosaurus and Uberabasuchus, whose osteoderms the team analyzed, may have reached a total body length of around 2–2.5 m (6 ft 7 in – 8 ft 2 in), though the they also note that among these three Itasuchus was likely the heaviest on account of its thicker armor, especially if it was similarly well armored as the closely related Caririsuchus. A precise estimate was provided by Woodward and colleagues in 2025. Based on the length of the femur they calculate a body weight ranging between 132.84–194.91 kg (292.9–429.7 lb).

== Phylogeny ==
Like the closely related Roxochampsa, Itasuchus was initially interpreted as a member of the family Goniopholididae, which nowadays encompasses several semi-aquatic neosuchians from the Jurassic to Cretaceous of North America, Europe and Asia, but no reliable South American record. By 1974 the idea of South American goniopholidids began to fall out of favor and Itasuchus came to be placed in the family Trematochampsidae, which was initially established for the African taxon Trematochampsa but eventually came to include a number of at times fragmentary forms both semi-aquatic and terrestrial. However this hypothesis too came into question due to the fact that the holotype of Trematochampsa may have been chimeric and the group had become a wastebasket of various unrelated animals.

In 2004 Carvalho and colleagues coined the family Itasuchidae, initially meant to unite Itasuchus with the African crocodyliform Malawisuchus as the sister group to Peirosauridae within Notosuchia. While the proposed connection between these two forms was eventually dismissed by later studies, which instead placed Malawisuchus closer to Pakasuchus, the clade name was eventually revived in 2018 by Pinheiro and colleagues in their redescription of "Goniopholis" paulistanus as Roxochampsa. This study recovered a monophyletic group consisting of various platyrostral, presumably semi-aquatic notosuchians resembling Itasuchus. More specifically, the group was initially recovered as including Itasuchus, Roxochampsa, Pepesuchus and Caririsuchus, with the proposed definition defining the clade as any taxon closer to Itasuchus than to Barreirosuchus, Montealtosuchus, Mahajangasuchus and Sebecus.

This general topology has been recovered repeatedly in the following years and was significantly expanded upon by various researchers, though the definition of the family was once again amended to include all taxa closer to Itasuchus and Stolokrosuchus than to Hamadasuchus, Mahajangasuchus and Sebecus. In some instances the nomenclature differs, with the 2024 paper by Ruiz and colleagues placing these taxa in the subfamily Pepesuchinae within Peirosauridae and others like the 2025 work of Wilberg and colleagues and the 2026 paper by Iori and colleagues using the name Itasuchidae, as established by Pinheiro et al., and recovered the family as the sister group to peirosaurids rather than a subset of them. This is the result of the 2018 study by Geroto and Bertini, who parallel to the revision to Itasuchidae conducted by Pinheiro and colleagues, coined the subfamily Pepesuchinae based on many of the same taxa. Regardless of the naming conventions, the results of Ruiz, Wilberg and Iori are only separated by negligible differences, only diverging in the newly described taxa established in these studies. Itasuchus is recovered as a derived itasuchid in a polytomy that also includes Caririsuchus and Roxochampsa as well as the poorly known Amargasuchus. Wilberg and colleagues also made an attempt to resolve this polytomy by providing a semi-strict consensus tree, which indicates that Amargasuchus and Roxochampsa may have been sister taxa and that Itasuchus in turn may have been the sister to this clade, while Caririsuchus was recovered to be the basalmost of the four.

Ruiz et al. (2024)

- - Notosuchia
    - Eunotosuchia
    - Sebecia
      - Doratodon carcharidens
      - - Mahajangasuchidae
        - - Sebecidae
          - Peirosauridae
            - Peirosaurinae
            - Pepesuchinae
              - Kinesuchus
              - - Stolokrosuchus
                - - Rukwasuchus
                  - - Epoidesuchus
                    - - Barreirosuchus
                      - - Pepesuchus
                        - - Amargasuchus
                          - Caririsuchus
                          - Itasuchus
                          - Roxochampsa

Wilberg et al. (2025) (strict consensus)

- - Doratodon
  - - Mahajangasuchidae
    - - Sebecidae
      - - Peirosauridae
        - Itasuchidae
          - Kinesuchus
          - - Stolokrosuchus
            - - Rukwasuchus
              - - Epoidesuchus
                - - - Sissokosuchus
                    - Barreirosuchus
                  - - Pepesuchus
                    - - Caririsuchus
                      - Itasuchus
                      - Amargasuchus
                      - Roxochampsa

Wilberg et al. (2025) (semi-strict consensus)

- - - Sissokosuchus
    - Barreirosuchus
  - - Pepesuchus
    - - Caririsuchus
      - - Itasuchus
        - - Amargasuchus
          - Roxochampsa

== Paleobiology ==
=== Ecology ===
Like other closely related species Itasuchus has been interpreted as a semi-aquatic animal. Aside from the skull that with its dorsally positioned eyes and nares closely resembles modern semi-aquatic crocodilians, the osteoderms have also been cited as evidence for such a lifestyle. Marinho and colleagues have argued that the pronounced keels on the dorsal osteoderms of Itasuchus made the animal more hydrodynamic and stabilized it when it was fully submerged. Furthermore, the team describes the tail of Itasuchus as laterally flattened, which together with the shifted keels in the laterodorsal tail osteoderms effectively creates a paddle. Marinho and colleagues also hypothesize that compared to the more terrestrial peirosaurids and even modern crocodilians, animals like Itasuchus would have had a harder time moving on land on account of their heavier, more restrictive osteoderm armor. In particular they note that the armor f Itasuchus is even more developed than in modern crocodiles, in which the circular and oval osteoderms reduce their mass and allow for greater flexibility. However at the same time Sena and colleagues have argued that the presence of a leathery skin layer above the osteoderms, as possibly suggested by the orientation of the sharpey's fibres, could have made the animal more flexible as something similar has been proposed for the modern leatherback sea turtle. In turn the large surface area of Itasuchus osteoderms would have been an advantage when it came to raising the animals body temperature, allowing it to absorb heat more efficiently and helping it become active quicker than the terrestrial peirosaurids. In a 2023 morphospace analysis itasuchids as a whole were recovered to represent an intermediate between long-snouted and brevirostrine forms, with Itasuchus in particular having been found close to the brevirostrine peirosaurid Antaeusuchus. The tooth diameter is among the contributing factors and has been regarded as similar, although not quite as developed, as in the modern nile crocodile.

=== Paleoenvironment ===
Remains of Itasuchus are known from two formations within Brazil's Bauru Basin, the Late Campanian to Early Maastrichtian Presidente Prudente Formation (at times simply regarded as a member of the Adamantina Formation) and the Maastrichtian Serra da Galga Member of the Marília Formation. However, more recent works have argued that the Serra da Galga Member, which is located in the north-east of the basin, is distinct from the south-western parts of the Marília Formation and no longer match the designation of member, instead representing a formation of its own. The only fossil from the Marília Formation that may hint at the presence of Itasuchus is a partial skull roof with affinities to the genus.

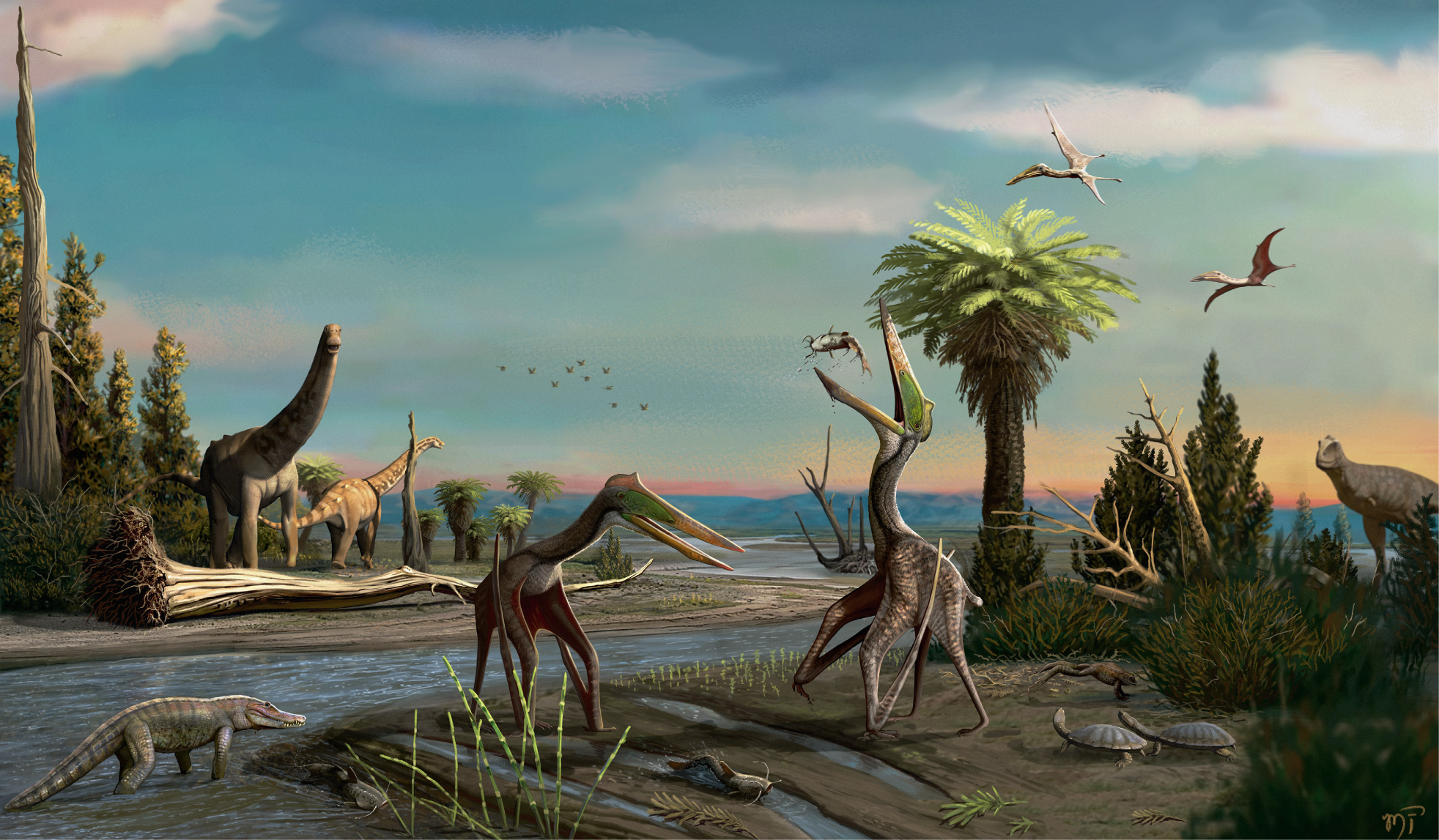
An artistic interpretation of the Serra da Galga Formation featuring the pterosaur Galgadraco and an unspecified itasuchid.

The Serra da Galga Formation has been interpreted as the medial and proximal parts of a large north-west flowing river system unrelated to the south-eastern systems that accumulated the deposits of the Marília Formation. Soares and colleagues recognize two depositional environments within the formation. The first is described as an elevated channel belt displaying a mix of channels (2–7 m (6 ft 7 in – 23 ft 0 in) deep) that deposited sediments slowly under steadier humid conditions and channels (1.5–8 m (4 ft 11 in – 26 ft 3 in) deep) depositing sediments under higher energy conditions, possibly related to drier periods and flooding events. The second depositional environment has been described as alternating interchannel deposits and smaller crevasse channels (1–1.5 m (3 ft 3 in – 4 ft 11 in) deep) in close proximity to the parent feeder channel. The interchannel deposits themselves show evidence of unconfined floods, poorly channelized flows and paleosoil. At the time the climate was likely arid to semi-arid, but also underwent wetter periods. A broadly similar environment has also been inferred for the older Presidente Prudente Formation, which is thought to represent a highly sinuous meandering river with sandy bars, crevasse splay and floodplains, likewise deposited under arid to semi-arid conditions.

The fauna of the Presidente Prudente Formation consisted of titanosaur sauropods like Austroposeidon and theropods like an abelisaurid and an indeterminate coelurosaur. The formation also preserves the bones of the closely related itasuchid Roxochampsa. Soares and colleagues note that the fossil contents of the younger Serra da Galga Formation are more diverse than what is found at the Marília Formation, the latter being dominated by dinosaurs and crocodylomorphs. In contrast, the Serra da Galga Formation preserves a much broader range of animals. Fish from the formation include catfish, Lepisosteiformes, bowfins, Characiformes, Perciformes and lungfish. Smaller amniotes include frogs, podocnemidid turtles and iguanian squamates. Besides Itasuchus mesoeucrocodylians are represented by the peirosaurids Peirosaurus and Uberabasuchus as well as "advanced notosuchians". Dinosaurs from the formation follow the same broad pattern seen in the Presidente Prudente Formation, being represented by large titanosaurs like Baurutitan, Uberabatitan and Caieiria, abelisaurs, unenlagines and enantiornithine stem-birds. The Serra da Galga Formation also preserves the first pterosaur described from the Bauru Group, Galgadraco. Plant life from the formation on the other hand is represented by the fossil pollen of gnetophytes, conifers and cycads.
