= Caririsuchus =

Caririsuchus Temporal range: Early Cretaceous Aptian–Albian

Scientific classification
- Kingdom: Animalia
- Phylum: Chordata
- Class: Reptilia
- Clade: Pseudosuchia
- Clade: Crocodylomorpha
- Clade: †Notosuchia
- Family: †Itasuchidae
- Genus: †Caririsuchus; Kellner 1987

Type species
- †Caririsuchus camposi Kellner, 1987

Extinct genus of reptiles

Caririsuchus is an extinct genus of itasuchid crocodylomorph from the Aptian to Albian Romualdo Formation of the Santana Group in the Araripe Basin in northeastern Brazil. The genus was described in 1987 based on multiple bones secured in a Brazilian fossil collection, but the much more complete fossil slab that these pieces were taken from was illegally shipped to Europe before being presumably sold into a private collection with its current whereabouts unknown. Some of the few remains that had stayed in Brazil were destroyed in the 2018 fire that destroyed large parts of the collection held in Rio de Janeiro.

Caririsuchus was a relatively small animal, measuring about 1.5 metres (4.9 ft) in length. It had a triangular head similar to modern crocodiles and has been noted for the extensive osteoderm armor covering not just its back but also its tail, limbs and stomach. The genus is considered to be a member of the clade Notosuchia, usually as a close relative to other platyrostral forms like Pepesuchus and Itasuchus in the clade Itasuchidae, though some authors have placed all these forms in the peirosaurid subfamily Pepesuchinae. Caririsuchus was a semi-aquatic animal that once inhabited the coastal Romualdo Formation.

== History and naming ==
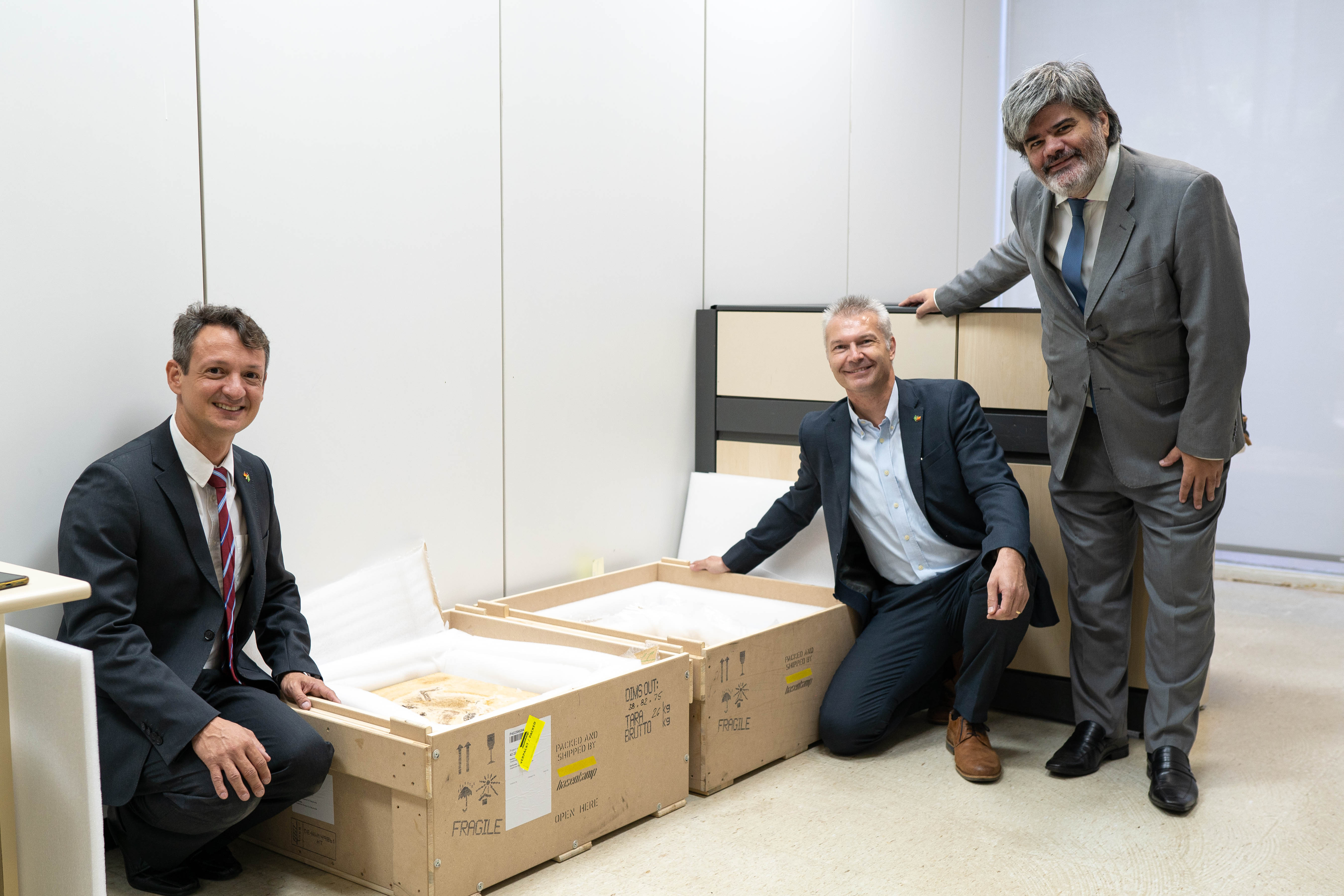
Fossils from Brazil's Araripe Basin such as the holotype of Caririsuchus and Ubirajara jubatus frequently fall victim to the illegal fossil trade, leading to them being lost to science.

The Araripe Basin of Brazil has long been subject to the illegal collection and selling of fossil material to foreign collectors, prompting the Brazilian Society of Paleontology to appeal researchers to focus on fossils from localities subject to exploitation and destruction. One such fossil was a nearly complete crocodylomorph only missing parts of some limbs preserved in a dark limestone slab presumably recovered from a coal mine exposing the Romualdo Formation (Santana Group). While most of the specimen was eventually shipped out of Brazil, some parts of the fossil including a portion of the rostrum and the osteoderms of multiple body regions were obtained by Rainer Alexander von Blittersdorff. These pieces were initially deposited in von Blittersdorff's Desirée Collection, though at least some osteoderms were later moved to the National Department of Mineral Production in Rio de Janeiro. Based on these remains as well as photographs of the complete fossil Brazilian paleontologist Alexander Kellner was able to determine that the animal represented a new species and genus, which he described in 1987 as Caririsuchus camposi.

Following its removal from Brazil, the specimen was next mentioned as having arrived in Europe, where it was briefly studied by Eric Buffetaut before disappearing again, presumably having been sold to a private collection. Although initially unaware of Kellner's work after being presented with the specimen, Buffetaut would later address his colleague's research in a contribution to the 1991 book "Santana Fossils : An Illustrated Atlas" by John G. Maisey. In this book Buffetaut argued that Caririsuchus was remarkably similar to Itasuchus from the Bauru Group, concluding that though distinct on a species level, Caririsuchus was a synonym of Itasuchus, creating the combination Itasuchus camposi. The book also features a photograph of a second well-preserved specimen including the skull, torso and tail including the osteoderm armor. According to Buffetaut the specimen was "reportedly also for sale" while remarking that the sale of the holotype "symbolizes the difficulty of saving scientifically valuable specimens from commercial exploitation".

The pieces that had remained in Brazil meanwhile were donated to two institutions, with two fragments ending up in the collection of the Museu Nacional in Rio de Janeiro and a third having been deposited at the Museu de Ciências da Terra, also in Rio. In 2018 the former was heavily damaged by a large fire destroying large parts of the paleontological collection. Despite salvage efforts, the Caririsuchus fossils held at the museum had not been recovered by 2024 and may have been destroyed.

Caririsuchus was named for the Kiriri people who once inhabited large parts of Brazil including the Araripe Basin. The ending "-suchus" meanwhile is a frequently used component in fossil crocodylomorph names, derived from the Greek "souchos" meaning crocodile. The species name on the other hand was chosen to honor Diogenes de Almeida Campos, a Brazilian paleontologist and geologist noted for his contribution to the study of the Araripe Basin.

== Description ==
Caririsuchus had a comparably high triangular skull with a moderately laterally-compressed, tapering platyrostral (flattened) snout that gradually widens towards the back of the skull. The forward-directed external nares are oval in shape and formed by the premaxillae and nasal bones, with the latter forming a septum that separates the nares into two distinct openings. The transition between the premaxilla and maxilla is well marked by the presence of a prominent notch that coincides with the premaxillary-maxillary suture. The maxillae are prominently sinusoidal in lateral view with pronounced festooning, resulting in a marked swelling at the location of the largest maxillary tooth. The nasals, which are paired as in other itasuchids, extend across the rostrum forming the bulging dorsal surface until reaching the bones just anterior to the eyesockets, sending posterior processes into the spaces between the frontal and prefrontal as well as the prefrontal and lacrimal.

The prefrontals are small and elongated, as are the lacrimals, which lack a ventral process and are wider towards the orbital margin and with no signs of possessing an antorbital fenestra. The frontal bone meanwhile roughly resembles an elongated triangle and consists of an anterior process that extends forward between the eyesockets to about the same level as the prefrontals and a posterior section. Overall the frontal has been described as reaching about half the length of the nasals, which it contacts along an irregular suture, inserting itself in between the two nasals. The eyesockets are large, circular and directed more laterally. Each orbit is protected by two palpebral bones, with the anterior being better developed than its posterior partner. The two bones cover most of the upper orbital margin and articulate with the surrounding bones. The anterior palpebral attaches to the prefrontal, lacrimal and frontal while the posterior rests on the frontal and postorbital bone.

The skull table is formed in part by the posterior portion of the frontal bone, which contacts the trapezoidal parietal along a straight suture and participates in forming the supratemporal fenestrae, a pair of openings notably smaller than the orbits. The parietal of Caririsuchus is relatively wide and short and forms the highest point of the animals skull. The postorbitals and squamosals form the outer edge and corners of the skull table as well as the lateral margin of the supratemporal fenestrae and the supraoccipital bone also participates in forming the skull table. As in related forms, the occipital surface of the squamosal slopes posteriorly.

In addition to their participation in the dorsal surface of the skull table, the postorbitals also possess a ventral projection that forms the dorsal half of the postorbital bar, a peg of bone that separates the orbits from the infratemporal fenestra. The postorbital bar is described as rod-like, moderately thin and positioned rather superficially instead of being inset relative to the surface of its contributing bones. The lower part of the postorbital bar is formed by the jugal, which forms the outer margin of the skull from its contact with the maxilla at the anterior end of the orbit until possibly the posterior end of the infratemporal fenestra, forming the openings lower edge. The relation between the jugal, quadratojugal and quadrate bone is poorly understood.

=== Mandible ===
Like the rostrum the lower jaw of Caririsuchus is tapering, narrow in the front and more robust towards its posterior end around the oval mandibular fenestra and articulation with the upper jaw. The majority of the mandible is formed by the elongated dentary, which broadly follows the same pattern as the lower jaw as a whole, tapering towards the front and more robust in the back where it contributes to the anterior margin of the mandibular fenestra. Like the upper jaw the mandible exhibits a festooned toothrow forming two waves that the teeth are placed atop of. This feature, which sees the first wave peak around the 4th and 5th dentary tooth and the second in the region from the 8th to 14th is also seen in several other itasuchids such as Roxochampsa, Pepesuchus and Itasuchus. The remaining bones of the lower jaw's outer surface; the angular, surangular and articular; have not been described in detail by Kellner beyond contributing to the mandibular fenestra.

=== Dentition ===
The upper jaw of Caririsuchus is thought to contain 21 or 22 teeth, four of which in the premaxilla and the remainder in the maxilla. The largest premaxillary teeth are the second or third while the largest maxillary teeth may be the second and third or the third and fourth depending on the total tooth count. Alexander Kellner hypothesized that the same number of teeth was present in the lower jaw, although only 12 could actually be preserved due to the preservation. The largest tooth of the lower jaw is the third or possibly the fourth dentary tooth, which shows a pseudocanine morphology. All teeth have finely serrated edges and the anterior teeth are generally more pointed whereas the teeth in the back of the jaw are smaller, blunter, more uniform and more labiolingually compressed. Pinheiro and colleagues note that the teeth of Caririsuchus were closely spaced and that the skull shows no clearly visible occlusal scars, which would suggest that like modern alligators the teeth of this taxon didn't interlock but instead were arranged in an overbite.

=== Limbs ===
Alexander Kellner describes the femur as being 25% larger than the humerus.

=== Osteoderms ===
Caririsuchus has been repeatedly noted for its extensive osteoderm armor, with Eric Buffetaut calling it "one of the most heavily armored of all known crocodilians". The armor stretches from just behind the head to the tip of the tail and is composed of a single parasagittal double row across the neck and torso. The individual plates are rectangular, wider than long and grow larger from the head to the middle of the body before decreasing in size towards the hip. The tail also preserves additional rows besides the midline double row, which have initially been interpreted as representing ventral armor by Kellner but were later clarified to have possibly covered the entire tail. In a 2024 abstract Pinheiro and colleagues describe a surviving section of armor likely coming from the lumbar-sacral or anterior caudal region as preserving the midline double row being accompanied by an accessory osteoderm on either side. The parasagittal osteoderms are noted as overlapping each other but lacking articulation processes at their anterolateral corner as in some other crocodylomorphs. They are further described as possessing low and wide keels down their midline and an ornamentation consisting of a pattern of pits that seems to radiate outward from the center of each scute. The accessory osteoderms differ from the midline osteoderms in being longer than wide, but share the same keels and ornamentation. The presence of ventral armor protecting the stomach is mentioned by Buffetaut, who furthermore notes that the limbs were similarly covered by bony scutes.

=== Size ===
Based on the holotype specimen Caririsuchus was a relatively small animal, only measuring 1.5 m (4 ft 11 in) in length from the tip of the snout to the end of the tail.

== Phylogeny ==
While Kellner compared the fossils of Caririsuchus to a wide range of South American crocodylomorphs, he did not assign it to any particular family at first, only placing it in the larger group Mesosuchia. The first person to place the taxon in a specific family was Eric Buffetaut, who regarded the animal to simply be another species of Itasuchus and therefore placed it in the family Trematochampsidae.

Since then, studies have cast doubt over the validity of Trematochampsidae as a family, with the type genus being regarded as dubious and chimeric while its members have been divided among several different groups within Notosuchia. Caririsuchus in particular has been consistently grouped with a variety of other semi-aquatic taxa, though the nomenclature differs between papers. Geroto and Bertini established the clade Pepesuchinae in 2018 as a subfamily of Peirosauridae, initially consisting of Caririsuchus (treated as a distinct genus from Itasuchus), Itasuchus, Pepesuchus and Barreirosuchus. Pinheiro and colleagues similarly redefined the clade Itasuchidae that same year, recovering it as a clade basal to peirosaurids, sebecids and mahajangasuchids and consisting of Caririsuchus, Itasuchus, Pepesuchus and Roxochampsa. In this work all four taxa were recovered in a polytomy, leading to a brief discussion of whether or not all four taxa should be placed in the genus Itasuchus as had been done by Buffetaut for Caririsuchus camposi. Ultimately however, like in the work of Geroto and Bertini, Caririsuchus was treated as a distinct genus rather than a species of Itasuchus. Several subsequent studies have recovered similar results in-spite of using different names. Ruiz and colleagues placed Caririsuchus in Pepesuchinae in a derived polytomy alongside Itasuchus, Roxochampsa and Amargasuchus. Almost the exact same results were recovered by Wilberg and colleagues in 2025, but placing all these taxa in the family Itasuchidae. Furthermore, in an attempt to resolve this polytomy a semi-strict consensus tree was also produced, placing Caririsuchus as the basalmost of these derived taxa. A third study reinforcing this overall relationship came with the description of Ibirasuchus by Iori and colleagues, again recovering Caririsuchus in a derived polytomy.

Ruiz et al. (2024)

- - Notosuchia
    - Eunotosuchia
    - Sebecia
      - Doratodon carcharidens
      - - Mahajangasuchidae
        - - Sebecidae
          - Peirosauridae
            - Peirosaurinae
            - Pepesuchinae
              - Kinesuchus
              - - Stolokrosuchus
                - - Rukwasuchus
                  - - Epoidesuchus
                    - - Barreirosuchus
                      - - Pepesuchus
                        - - Amargasuchus
                          - Caririsuchus
                          - Itasuchus
                          - Roxochampsa

Wilberg et al. (2025) (strict consensus)

- - Doratodon
  - - Mahajangasuchidae
    - - Sebecidae
      - - Peirosauridae
        - Itasuchidae
          - Kinesuchus
          - - Stolokrosuchus
            - - Rukwasuchus
              - - Epoidesuchus
                - - - Sissokosuchus
                    - Barreirosuchus
                  - - Pepesuchus
                    - - Caririsuchus
                      - Itasuchus
                      - Amargasuchus
                      - Roxochampsa

Wilberg et al. (2025) (semi-strict consensus)

- - - Sissokosuchus
    - Barreirosuchus
  - - Pepesuchus
    - - Caririsuchus
      - - Itasuchus
        - - Amargasuchus
          - Roxochampsa

Alternatively some studies have recovered Caririsuchus not as an itasuchid but as a close relative of the family Mahajangasuchidae, which includes the Nigerian taxon Kaprosuchus and Mahajangasuchus from Maastrichtian Madagascar. Pinheiro and colleagues that in both instances this relationship has been recovered the results appear to be linked to the removal of Ayllusuchus, itself a wildcard taxon, and that they regard it as more likely that Caririsuchus was indeed an itasuchid.

== Paleobiology ==
Caririsuchus with its platyrostral snout has been interpreted as a semi-aquatic animal.

=== Paleoenvironment ===
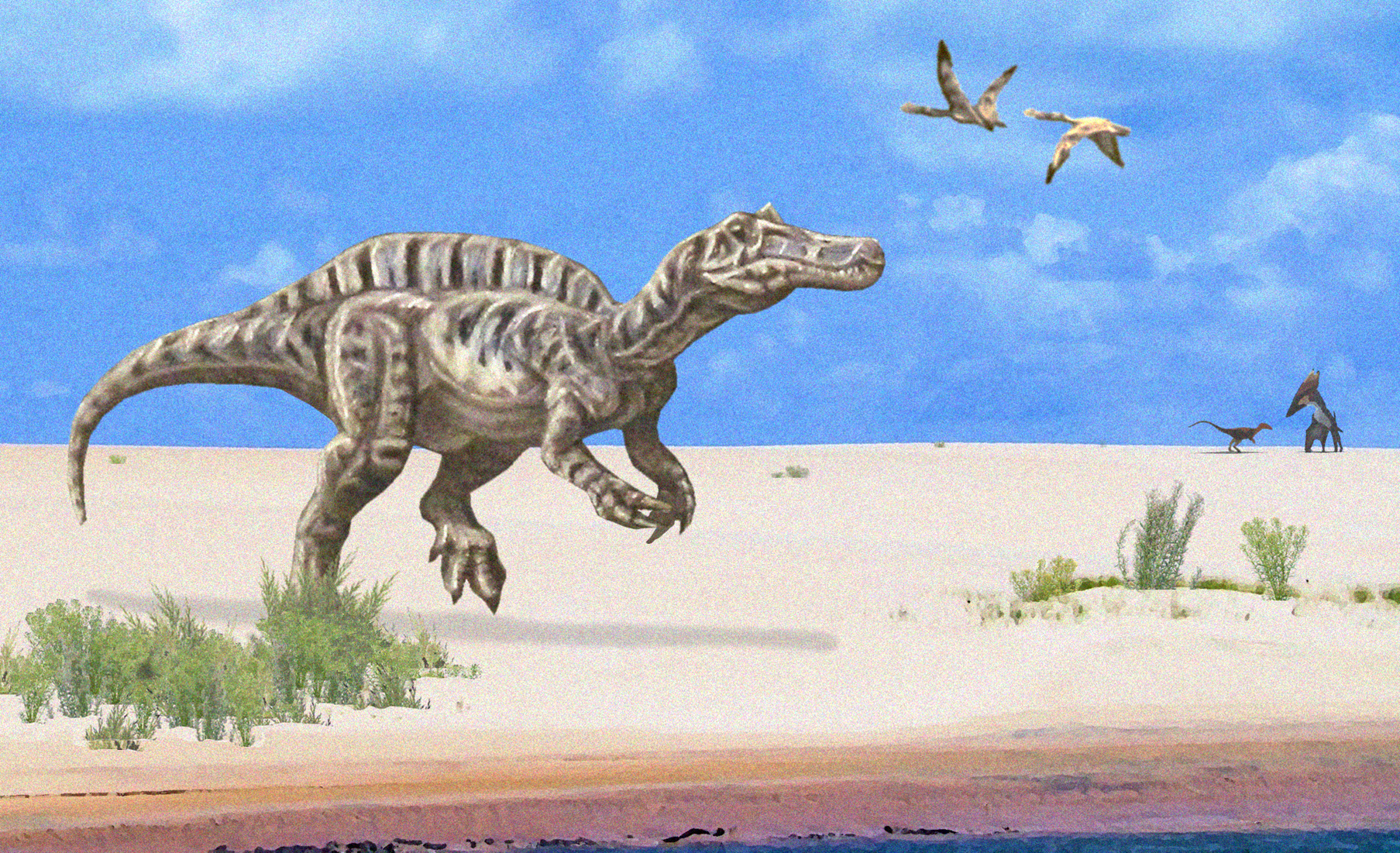
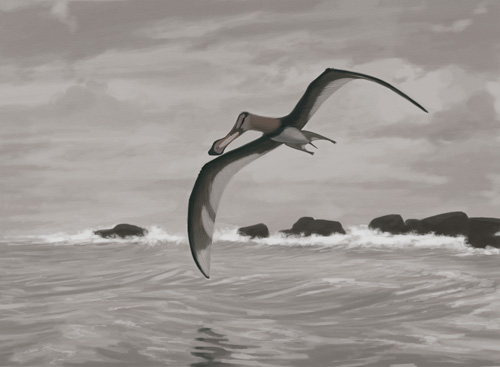
The only known remains of Caririsuchus come from the coastal Romualdo Formation, well known for preserving the spinosaurid Irritator as well as a plethora of pterosaurs.

The fossils of Caririsuchus are exclusively known from the Romualdo Formation (Santana Group), a Konservat-Lagerstätte located in Brazil′s Araripe Basin. The sediments of the Romualdo Formation were deposited in a coastal setting subject to marine influence, with the eastern Araripe Basin recording two cycles of marine transgression (sea-level rises) and regressions (sea-level fall) following the split of western Gondwana and the accompanying opening of the South Atlantic. Echinoderms, bivalves and gastropods show a clear marine origin, though at least the latter were likely capable of tolerating significant changes in salt concentration. Ostracods from the base of the Romualdo Formation are at times regarded as freshwater forms, but other studies such as Fürsich et al. 2019 regard them as at the very least euryhaline, able to tolerate both brackish and saltwater. This mirrors the teams argument that Romualdo never experienced fully marine conditions and was instead possibly subject to shifting levels of salinity, with such brackish conditions also supported by siliciclastic sediments, plant debris and a spinicaudatan branchiopod that were likely washed out by a nearby river. Overall the paleoenvironment may have featured a variety of near-shore environments, with interpretations suggesting the presence of lagoons, deltas and even an inland sea.

Plant fossils from the Romualdo Formation includes the remains of the gymnosperms Pseudofrenelopsis as well as two species of Brachyphyllum. The formation has also yielded a large amount of palynomorphs, mostly pollen and spores, which Lacerda and colleagues managed to divide into two broader sections each corresponding to different environmental conditions and reflecting the shifting sealevels that were present throughout the formation's preservation. Lower parts of their sample reveal a marine environment closer to the shore with a strong continental influence, expressed through the dominance of land plants like Classopollis, Afropollis, Equisetosporites, Cycadopites and Gnetaceaepollenites as well as freshwater algae. Ferns and lycophytes were also present but comparably rare, likely due to the preference for shaded, humid areas held by members of these groups. The second, more recent grouping meanwhile appears to correspond to a distal marine setting, featuring a decrease in the pollen of landplants an increase in marine dinocysts and foraminiferal linings. The terrestrial flora appears to have consisted of shrubby to arboreal xerophytic plants as found in lowland rainforests. The palynomorph Classopollis is common throughout layers and suggests the presence of mangroves, deltas or lagoons while also being classified as xerophytic, meaning it was resistant to drought conditions. Overall, the palynoflora of the Romualdo Formation is typical of a tropical setting with a warm paleoclimate and semiarid to arid conditions.

The Romualdo Formation is well known for its excellent preservation of vertebrates due to the low oxygen conditions likely present at the seafloor. The fish fauna alone includes over 19 species including Tharrhias, Vinctifer and Cladocyclus, which appear to be found in distinct horizons with their own fauna. Taxa like Tharrhias and Rhacolepis were likely similar to modern milkfish in ecology while Vinctifer was a piscivorous mesopredator. The Romualdo Formation was also home to benthic durophages such as batoid rays and Neoproscinetes, similar to modern guitarfish and triggerfish respectively. Species of the genus Calamopleurus would have filled the roles of aquatic apex predators, likely operating in different parts of the water column and feeding on anything small enough to fit in their mouths including members of their own species.

Among terrestrial vertebrates pterosaurs are some of the most well-known animals, with up to 25 species recognized depending on the author, though the validity of some forms is debated. The pterosaurs of the Romualdo Formation belonged to several morphologically distinct groups including tapejarids, anhanguerids (such as Brasileodactylus and Tropeognathus) and thalassodromids (including Tupuxuara and Thalassodromeus iself). The toothed anhanguerids have been interpreted as piscivorous mesopredators while the rarer thalassodromine pterosaurs appear to have been opportunistic terrestrial predators. Dinosaurs are only represented by theropods, most of which from the upper parts of the formation, specifically the spinosaurids Irritator and Angaturama as well as the coelurosaurs Santanaraptor and Mirischia. The only known theropod from the lower parts of the formation is Aratasaurus. The only Romualdo crocodylomorph besides Caririsuchus was the small terrestrial notosuchian Araripesuchus.
