= Trematochampsidae =

Trematochampsidae Temporal range: 130–66.5 Ma Early to Late Cretaceous

Scientific classification
- Kingdom: Animalia
- Phylum: Chordata
- Class: Reptilia
- Clade: Pseudosuchia
- Clade: Crocodylomorpha
- Clade: Metasuchia
- Family: †Trematochampsidae; Buffetaut, 1974

Genera
- †Amargasuchus? †Baharijodon? †Barreirosuchus †Miadanasuchus? †Trematochampsa

Extinct family of reptiles

Trematochampsidae is an extinct family of mesoeucrocodylian crocodyliforms. Fossils are present from Madagascar, Morocco, Niger, Argentina, and Brazil (in the case of Caririsuchus, where some specimens have been found in the Romualdo Member of the Santana Formation). Possible trematochampsids have been found from Spain and France, but classification past the family level is indeterminant. The trematochampsids first appeared during the Barremian stage of the Early Cretaceous and became extinct during the late Maastrichtian stage of the Late Cretaceous.

== Description ==
Trematochampsids are deep-snouted and have a ziphodont tooth structure. The dentition differs from most other crocodilians in that the teeth are recurved, serrated, and lateromedially compressed. This may be an adaptation to a terrestrial or at least semiterrestrial lifestyle as such teeth would be better suited for cutting and tearing into prey as opposed to capturing them and holding them underwater. Despite this, most trematochampsids are presumed to have been aquatic.

== Taxonomy ==
There has been much controversy surrounding the family's phylogeny, and the group's monophyly has been questioned. Relations between taxa within the family are also poorly understood. Many crocodylomorphs such as Mahajangasuchus, Bergisuchus and Iberosuchus had originally been assigned to Trematochapsidae but have since been assigned to the family Sebecidae or put into their own families. Neogene sebecosuchians of Europe have been reclassified as trematochampsids but have recently been supported as true sebecosuchians as was originally proposed.

Itasuchus had originally been assigned to Trematochapsidae. The phylogenetic analysis of Carvalho et al. (2004) found a sister relations between Malawisuchus and Itasuchus. They named this node family Itasuchidae, and found it to be a member of Peirosauroidea. However, their analysis didn't include any neosuchians or (other than Itasuchus) trematochampsids. All more recent phylogenetic analyses found a close relations between Trematochapsidae and Peirosauridae, and the two clades might be synonymous. Recent studies suggest that Itasuchus is a trematochampsid (and not closely related to the more derived notosuchian Malawisuchus). In 2012, the new trematochampsid Barreirosuchus was described from the Bauru Basin as Itasuchus and it shares with it, and with Caririsuchus camposi from the Araripe Basin, several synapomorphies that are absent in other trematochampsids and peirosaurids. The cladistic analysis of Rukwasuchus found Trematochampsa a member of Peirosauridae.

More recently, Trematochampsa taqueti was declared a nomen dubium by Meunier and Larsson (2018), who found that the materials assigned to it were from several different taxa. They also recommended that the taxon Trematochampsidae be abandoned.
