= Rukwasuchus =

Rukwasuchus Temporal range: Late Cretaceous, Cenomanian–Campanian

Scientific classification
- Kingdom: Animalia
- Phylum: Chordata
- Class: Reptilia
- Clade: Pseudosuchia
- Clade: Crocodylomorpha
- Clade: †Notosuchia
- Family: †Itasuchidae
- Genus: †Rukwasuchus; Sertich & O’Connor, 2014

Type species
- †Rukwasuchus yajabalijekundu Sertich & O’Connor, 2014

Extinct genus of reptiles

Rukwasuchus is an extinct genus of notosuchian crocodyliforms known from the Late Cretaceous Galula Formation of southwestern Tanzania. Only a limited number of fossils are known, including parts of the skull and a few isolated teeth, however the preservation of the holotype meant that the endocast could be described in detail. Phylogenetic analysis generally recover Rukwasuchus as being a member of the clade Peirosauria, either within Peirosauridae as originally proposed or more recently as a basal member of the family Itasuchidae, the members of which are sometimes also placed within Peirosauridae as the subfamily Pepesuchinae. Rukwasuchus inhabitet what is now Tanzania during the Cenomanian to Campanian, at which point the region was covered by an extensive braided river system. While several purportedly closely related forms have been interpreted as semi-aquatic, some features of the brain of Rukwasuchus may indicate more terrestrial habits. The genus is monotypic, it contains only a single species, Rukwasuchus yajabalijekundu.

== History and naming ==
Rukwasuchus is known from its holotype, RRBP 08630, a well-preserved rear part of the skull including the cranial table, braincase, and interorbital region lacking the rostrum, the front portion of the palate, both lacrimals, jugals, and quadratojugals, as well as the mandible. RRBP 08630 was collected during 2008 at Namba 2 locality (also known as RRBP 2007-02), together with the titanosaurian Rukwatitan bisepultus which is exclusive to this locality. Material referred to Rukwasuchus includes four isolated teeth, which came from the neighboring localities RRBP 2007-01 yielding the 3 teeth RRBP 07351, 07369, 09362, and RRBP 2009-01 yielding the tooth RRBP 09367. All specimens came from approximately 25 km south of Lake Rukwa in the Galula Study Area, Rukwa Rift Basin of southwestern Tanzania, belonging to the Namba Member of the Galula Formation, which though initially interpreted as being late Aptian to early Cenomanian in age has more recently been regarded as dating to the Cenomanian to Campanian. Rukwasuchus was named by Joseph J. W. Sertich and Patrick M. O’Connor in 2014 and the type species is Rukwasuchus yajabalijekundu.

The generic name refers to Lake Rukwa and the Rukwa Rift Basin, located in southwestern Tanzania, where the holotype of Rukwasuchus and other vertebrates were collected by the Rukwa Rift Basin Project, and suchus, Latinized from the Greek souchos, an Egyptian crocodile god. The specific name yajabalijekundu is derived from the Swahili language meaning "of/from the red outcrop", in reference to the Red Sandstone Group deposits exposed at the basin.

== Description ==
Rukwasuchus is only known from comparably limited material consisting of the skull table, orbital region and braincase but lacking most of the rostrum, dermatocranial material and preserving no postcrania. The skull of Rukwasuchus has been described as taller and narrower than that of Stolokrosuchus, an animal from the Cretaceous of Niger with an extremely elongated snout, and has further been noted as most closely resembling that of Hamadasuchus. A morphometric analysis later suggested that there is a clear distinction between longirostrine peirosaurians like Roxochampsa varyingly called itasuchids or pepesuchines and the oreinorostrine peirosaurines such as Montealtosuchus. However, some forms, including Rukwasuchus, do fall within the range of variation of other notosuchians as a whole.

The prefrontal is elongated and its surface is covered by rounded crenulations and pits. Due to the broken nature of the holotype skull little is known about its relationship with other bones other than that each prefrontal contacts the anterior process of the frontal medially along a mostly straight suture. The prefrontal possesses a groove that extends into a distinct shelf that likely would have also continued onto the lacrimal bone to serve as a point of articulation for a palpebral bone stretching over the eye socket. The prefrontal's contribution to the orbital margin is elevated, with said elevation continuing onto the frontal and eventually postorbital bone to give the eye socket a moderately raised rim. The frontal itself consists of two parts, the elongated anterior process sandwiched between the prefrontals, extending approximately as far forward as these bones, and the wider posterior section located on the skull table. There the frontal forms part of the supratemporal fossae, contacting the parietal bone along a straight tranverse suture between the fossa and the postorbitals along a relatively straight, raised suture laterally.

The postorbitals from the anterior corners of the trapezoidal skull table and can broadly be divided into an anterolateral and posterior process, which form the dorsal surface, and a descending process. The anterolateral process is described as moderately depressed, comes into contact with the frontal along a relatively raised peak and forms the anterior border of the supratemporal fenestra as well as the wall of the supratemporal fossa. The fenestrae are described as ellipsoidal in overall shape, which sets them apart from the almost circular openings in the skull of Stolokrosuchus. The posterior process of the postorbital forms the lateral margin of the skull table until roughly the halfway point of the fenestra, where it meets the squamosal along a suture that initially begins transversely at the edge of the skull opening but then curves forward towards the edge of the skull table. The meeting point between anterolateral and posterior processes is marked by the presence of an anterodorsally directed depression just above the descending process, likely the posterior articular facet for the posterior palpebral. The squamosal then form the posterior corner of the skull table, the dorsal surface divided into an anterior, posterior and medial process. The anterior process is the part of the squamosal that comes into contact with the postorbital along the dorsally medially, then anterolateral suture, however in truth the squamosal extends much further, underlying the postorbital and even reaching as far as the postorbital bar. The posterior process is subtriangular and extends backwards beyond the occipital surface, ending in a rounded slightly upturned point. Finally, the medial process is the smallest of the three and comes into contact with the parietal. The squamosal also forms a portion of the posterior wall of the supratemporal fossa. The parietal forms the posterior and central parts of the skull table, with the anterior and posterior ends wider than the narrow section sandwiched between the fenestrae. It has been described as bearing both ridges towards its lateral margins as well as a sagittal crest. The parietal is widest at the back of the skull, where it is notably depressed as in some other African peirosaurians and overlies the supraoccipital entirely.

The postorbital also contributes to the side of the skull through its descending process, which itself bifurcates into two processes. Part of it joins an ascending process of the jugal to form the postorbital bar, which separates the orbit from the infratemporal fenestra. Like in other crocodyliforms the postorbital bar bears a vascular opening, however in the case of Rukwasuchus its located posterolaterally, which is otherwise only seen in Epoidesuchus and Pepesuchus. The other segment of the descending process is a well developed posteroventral process that forms the upper edge of the infratemporal fenestra, overlays part of the quadrate bone and would have likely ended as it contacted the quadratojugal. Also visible laterally beneath the skull table is a robust anterior descending lamina of the squamosal and the bony optic aperture, which is described as irregularily shaped with an oval, dorsally opening posterior section. Above otic aperture the lamina flares as it contacts both the anterior process of the quadrate and the postorbital's posteroventral process. Together the posteroventral postorbital and the anterodorsal process of both quadrate and quadratojugal form the anterior edge of the meatal chamber via a well developed concave surface, which differs strongly from the much less well developed surface seen in longirostrine peirosaurians like Pepesuchus and Stolokrosuchus. The optic aperture is overhung by the edge of the squamosal′s dorsal surface, which forms a deep optic recess. Unlike in derived neosuchians including today's crocodiles the recess is not closed posteriorly but instead opens ventrally.

As typical for crocodyliforms the quadrate consists of an anterodorsal region and a main body. The former extends anterior to contact both the postorbital and squamosal and forms both the anterior and ventral edges of the optic aperture. The main body is robust, elongated and featuring two hemicondyles, one laterally and one medially. While the quadratojugal itself is not preserved, the edges of the quadrate indicate that the two were in contact onward from the postorbital and that the quadratojugal participated in forming the articular surface of the lateral hemicondyle. Dorsally the main body of the quadrate contacts the squamosal via a not very tall but long dorsal process that effectively creates significant distance between the optic aperture and the back of the skull. The dorsal process is separated from the medial hemicondyle by a low yet prominent crest that splits the quadrate, when viewed from behind, into a posterodorsal and a posteromedial surface, the latter of which bears both the foramen aereum and contributes to the cranioquadrate passage. Also in posterior view the quadrates are subrectangular in shape and jut out from the rest of the skull outward and downward. The medial hemicondyle is described as larger with a sharply pointed ventromedial (lower and inner) edge and a main axis that is oriented from this corner dorsolaterally towards the upper and outer corner. The lateral condyle on the other hand is smaller and more rounded with an axis oriented straight down.

The occipital region is well preserved in the holotype of Rukwasuchus. The squamosal is exposed, but its dorsolateral presence on the occiput is relatively short compared to that of Barreirosuchus. The supraoccipital is exclusively visible in posterior view as it is fully overlain by the parietal on the skull table, which furthermore forms a ventral deflection that gives this bone a pronounced U-shape. To either side of the indented upper edge lie the postoccipital processes, which are underlain by a raised, rounded ridge and themselves lie medial to the posttemporal fenestrae. Ventrally the supraoccipital bears a prominent bulge flanked by depressions, but the bone does not contact the foramen magnum due to the fact that the otoccipitals contact each other along the midline. The otoccipitals dominate the occipital surface and the contact between them and the supraoccipital reflects the contact of the latter with the parietal, forming a broad U-shaped suture stretching between the posttemporal fenestrae. Where the otoccipitals contact the squamosals and the quadrates they form large rectangular paroccipital processes, which are covered by striations that radiate outward across the posterior surface. Ventromedially to the contact between paroccipital process and quadrate sits the opening for the cranioquadrate canal. Ventrally to the paroccipital processes the otoccipitals eventually come into contact with the basioccipital, which would have likely formed the central portion of the occipital condyle while the otoccipitals would have formed the dorsolateral edges, and the parabasisphenoid. The medial edge of the otoccipitals furthermore forms most of the rim of the foramen magnum other than the bottom edge, which is instead formed by the basioccipital. The surface of the otoccipital exposed in the occipital region is described as being divided into two broader regions by a convexity that spans from the midline to the outer parts of the paroccipital processes. Above the convexity the otoccipital is smooth, while below it the bone is pierced by a number of foramina that are interprited as the exits for a number of nerves and the internal carotid artery. The basioccipital lies just below the otoccipitals as a subtriangular plate that when complete would form part of the occipital condyle and contributes to the basal tubera, both of which the otoccipitals also contribute to. The surface of the basioccipital is generally smooth but divided by a vertical crest and the outer edges form rugose tubera that overhang the parabasisphenoid ventrally and ventrolaterally. Aside from these tubera however the basioccipital underlies the parabasiphenoid, which sandwiches both the larger opening of the median Eustachian formane and the smaller slit-like lateral Eustachian foramina between the two bones.

The laterosphenoid, which forms the anterolateral wall for the braincase, can be divided into two laminae, one anterolateral and one posterolateral which themselves are separated by a crest. The former is contacted by an internal descending process of the frontal above it, the parabasisphenoid below it and the laterosphenoid of the other skull half medially. Together the anterolateral laterosphenoid and its adjacent bones enclose the olfactory fissure, a sulcus originating at the optic foramen and several nerve openings. The capitate process, located medially to the postorbital bar, separates the anterolateral lamina from the bones posterior section, at which point the laterosphenoid forms part of the adductor chamber and meets the parietal and quadrate. Below the posterolateral lamina the laterosphenoid forms a broad bridge over the trigeminal fossa, dividing the various branches of the corresponding nerve. While the laterosphenoid forms the anterolateral walls of the braincase, the parabasisphenoid contributes mostly to the floor, which means that its mostly obscured by the pterygoid ventrally and is only visible towards the front where it forms the plate-like parabasisphenoid rostrum and towards the back where it appear as a thin sheet wedged in-between the otoccipital, basioccipital, pterygoid and quadrate. The parabasisphenoid rostrum, also known as the cultriform process, extends as a subrectangular plate parallel to the anterior pterygoid process, widens towards its dorsal edge and contacts both the laterosphenoid bridge as well as a small part of the anterolateral laterosphenoid lamina. It housed the exit for the abducens nerve, participates in forming the hypophyseal fossa, forms most of the opening for the oculomotor nerve and contributes to the rim of the optic foramen.

The underside of the skull in Rukwasuchus is poorly preserved, but does show that the single pterygoid featured an elongated anterior process, two transverse processes and a tall dorsal process, all of which converge behind the choanae into a broad pterygoid plate. The anterior process forms a rod-like projection towards the front of the snout and contributes to the roof of the nasopharyngeal canals as well as the dorsolateral roof of the internal nares. The internal nares are furthermore separated by a thin septum and generally described as more narrow and positioned relatively far forward compared to the broad, posteriorly-located choanae of Hamadasuchus. The transverse processes extend ventrolaterally outwards from the pterygoid plate and the outer edge of the internal nares. While incomplete in Rukwasuchus, Sertich and colleagues suggest that they were likely broad plate-lake elements like in Hamadasuchus. The pterygoid plate is broad and weakly concave with a rounded posterior edge. The dorsal processes meanwhile extend almost straight up and come into close contact with the bones of the braincase. The posterolaterally free edges of the dorsal process form thin, sharp crests that continue onto the pterygoid process of the quadrate, forming what is referred to as crest B. In addition to this crest, the underside of the quadrate also bears a well-developed crest A, which stretches parallel to the outer edge of the bone from the adductor chamber to the midpoint of the quadrate. The prominence of crest A and continuous presence of crest B across quadrate and pterygoid has also been noted in other peirosaurians like Stolokrosuchus, Hamadasuchus and Montealtosuchus.

=== Dentition ===
While the holotype of Rukwasuchus preserves neither teeth nor alveoli, several teeth from the Galula Formation have nonetheless been tentatively referred to this taxon. The teeth are described as subconical with a weak construction between root and crown and moderate labiolingual (side-to-side) compression. The mesial and distal cutting edges or carinae of the teeth bear distinct denticles like those seen in Hamadasuchus and the enamel furthermore possess weak crenulations and striations that run down the surface longitudinally. While not directly associated with the cranial remains, these teeth were assigned to Rukwasuchus due to the fact that they resemble the typical peirosaurid morphology while also being clearly distinct from the small peg-like and multicuspid teeth of the other Galula crocodylomorph, Pakasuchus.

=== Endocast ===
Thanks to the preservation of the braincase CT scans reveal large parts of the endocast of Rukwasuchus with only some parts of the internal structure obscured by damage or dense matrix still adhering to the fossil. The overall shape resembles modern gharials and freshwater crocodiles, with the two hemispheres of the cerebrum broad and tapering both towards the back and front, forming an element that is spade-shaped and modestly high. Barrios and colleagues do however note that the hemispheres of larger forms including Rukwasuchus are generally narrower than those of smaller forms such as Simosuchus. The anterior cerebrum connects to the narrow, relatively long and ventrally downturned olfactory tract, which ends in a moderately broad olfactory bulb. However the olfactory bulb differs in being very well developed and also more downturned compared to other crocodyliforms. They further differ in possibly having been divided by a shallow sulcus, while other crocodylomorphs the olfactory bulbs tend to be undivided. Another distinct feature of the endocast of Rukwasuchus noted in the 2014 description is a prominent indentation just behind the cerebrum while the rest of the dorsal endocast surface is more typical in its morphology. The transition between midbrain and hindbrain has been noted as being distinct, sitting at an angle of 150°, though this is nevertheless still not nearly as sharp as in Zulmasuchus.

The CT scans also shows the main dorsal part of the large dural venous sinus, including the dorsal sinus, which stretches over the olfactory tract and the cerebrum as well as the occipital sinus that overlies the brainstem (tectum and medulla) as well as the hindbrain (cerebellum). The dorsal longitudinal dural venous sinus bears a prominent inflation which is referred to as the dural peak, named after a similar structure observed in dinosaurs. Among the two morphotypes recognized by Jorgo Ristevski for this structure, Rukwasuchus exemplifies the blunt form, characterized by a dural peak that in profile view appears elongated and rounded. The endocast of Rukwasuchus also bears a pair of protrusions referred to as the pericerebral spines, which are accompanied by lateral ridges and otherwise only known in Zulmasuchus and Campinasuchus among notosuchians.

The underside of the endocast features a prominent hypophyseal fossa and a pair of cavernous dural venous sinuses, the latter of which are located behind the hemispheres of the cerebrum, the postpituitary notch and the well developed ventral longitudinal dural venous sinus on the hindbrain. The longitudinal sinus on top of the endocast is connected to the ventral cavernous sinus via the sphenoparietal dural venous sinus, which passes transversely just behind the cerebrum. Some regions, though not fully preserved, can be inferred in their location. For instance the prominent flocculus was likely located just before where the opistotics projects into the skull cavity, pinching the endocast, as is the common placement. Passing through the anterior edge of the flocculus was most likely the transverse dural venous sinus. The pituitary gland is described as rather small and the pituitary fossa, like in the not especially closely related baurusuchids, is directed almost ventrally.

=== Size ===
Nicholl and colleagues describe Rukwasuchus as being a medium-to large-bodied animal.

== Phylogeny ==
The phylogenetic analysis initiallyconducted by Sertich and O'Connor suggested that Rukwasuchus was closely related to either the more robust Hamadasuchus or the longirostrine Stolokrosuchus, with all three taxa recovered in a trichotemy. This groupings next closest relative in the analysis was found to be the problematic genus Trematochampsa, which essentially resulted in a clade of derived African peirosaurids in a clade otherwise known from South America. Rukwasuchus was again recovered as a derived peirosaurid in the phylogenetic analysis of Nicholl and colleagues published in 2021 alongside the description of Antaeusuchus, although the resulting tree no longer featured the distinct African clade found in the 2014 study. Instead Rukwasuchus was recovered as most closely associated with a clade formed by Uberabasuchus, Lomasuchus and Montealtosuchus. Both Hamadasuchus and Stolokrosuchus were recovered in more basal positions.

- Notosuchia
  - Anatosuchus
  - - - Uruguaysuchus
      - Ziphosuchia
    - - Araripesuchus spp.
      - - Mahajangasuchidae
          - Kaprosuchus
          - Mahajangasuchus
        - Peirosauridae
          - Gasparinisuchus
          - Lomasuchus
          - - - Montealtosuchus
              - Uberabasuchus
            - - Trematochampsa
              - - Hamadasuchus
                - Stolokrosuchus
                - Rukwasuchus

- Notosuchia
  - - Uruguaysuchidae
    - - Mahajangasuchidae
        - Kaprosuchus
        - Mahajangasuchus
      - Peirosauridae
        - Stolokrosuchus
        - - - Bayomesasuchus
            - - Hamadasuchus
              - Antaeusuchus
          - - - Miadanasuchus
              - Barrosasuchus
            - - Gasparinisuchus
              - Rukwasuchus
              - - Uberabasuchus
                - - Lomasuchus
                  - Montealtosuchus
  - - Candidodon
    - Ziphosuchia

These results placing Rukwasuchus among oreinorostrine peirosaurids are contrasted with analysis that incorporate a greater number of longirostrine forms, which in said analysis generally form a monophyletic group either referred to as Itasuchidae or Pepesuchinae. The successive studies describing the itasuchids Epoidesuchus, Sissokosuchus and Ibirasuchus all recovered Rukwasuchus as an early member of this group, building on each others results and only significantly differing in nomenclature choices and the inclusion of new taxa. Featured below are the results of Ruiz et al. 2024 as well as Wilberg et al. 2025, the former using the name Pepesuchinae whereas the latter places these animals in the family Itasuchidae. In the former scenario, these animals are regarded as a subfamily of Peirosauridae and sister group to Peirosaurinae while in the latter case the grouping is elevated to family leven and considered to be the sister group to Peirosauridae. In both instances Rukwasuchus diverged after the Argentinian Kinesuchus and Stolokrosuchus from Niger, but before the majority of South American forms.

- - Notosuchia
    - Eunotosuchia
    - Sebecia
      - Doratodon carcharidens
      - - Mahajangasuchidae
        - - Sebecidae
          - Peirosauridae
            - Peirosaurinae
            - Pepesuchinae
              - Kinesuchus
              - - Stolokrosuchus
                - - Rukwasuchus
                  - - Epoidesuchus
                    - - Barreirosuchus
                      - - Pepesuchus
                        - - Amargasuchus
                          - Caririsuchus
                          - Itasuchus
                          - Roxochampsa

- - Doratodon
  - - Mahajangasuchidae
    - - Sebecidae
      - - Peirosauridae
        - Itasuchidae
          - Kinesuchus
          - - Stolokrosuchus
            - - Rukwasuchus
              - - Epoidesuchus
                - - - Sissokosuchus
                    - Barreirosuchus
                  - - Pepesuchus
                    - - Caririsuchus
                      - Itasuchus
                      - Amargasuchus
                      - Roxochampsa

== Paleobiology ==
Barrios and colleagues have argued that the enlarged olfactory bulbs, which are associated with a keener sense of smell on land, support the idea that Rukwasuchus was a terrestrial animal, as was the ancestral condition. The team has however also highlighted that the length of the rostrum, which is unknown in Rukwasuchus, could favor somatosensation over the animal's sense of smell. The enlarged cerebellar flocculus may be associated with the animal performing more complex movements of the head and living a more active lifestyle.

Rukwasuchus is exclusively known from the Namba Member, the uppermost stratigraphic level of the Galula Formation in Tanzania, which may be as old as the Cenomanian and as young as the Campanian stage of the Late Cretaceous. Multiple other fossil animals have been named based on remains from these sediments, including the notosuchian Pakasuchus, the gondwanathere Galulatherium, titanosaurs such as Rukwatitan and Shingopana. Unnamed animals include a non-avian theropod, osteoglossomorph fish and lungfish as well as turtles. Overall the fauna shares similrities with other Cretaceous East African formations such as the Malawi Dinosaur Beds. These animals inhabited what has been interpreted as a long-lived, torrential braided river system with thin, discontinuous floodplains. Roberts and colleagues calculate that the channels of the Namba Member ranged between 8.88–14.9 m (29.1–48.9 ft) in depth and may have been several hundred meters wide, with the entire system's width possibly approaching kilometers. Paleocurrent analysis suggests that att the time of Rukwasuchus this river system would have flown into a north-western direction. While the underlying Mtuka Member appears to represent a seasonally dry, sub-arid environment, the Namba Member was deposited after a subtle shift in climate that changed environmental conditions to be wetter and sub-humid with paleosol matching an open forest environment. The conditions that the holotype of Shingopana was preserved under suggest that despite the wetter conditions the river system nonetheless experienced cycles or seasons of changing conditions, leading to river channels becoming abandoned and being filled in.
