= Trematochampsa =

Trematochampsa Temporal range: Coniacian-Santonian, 89–83 Ma

Scientific classification
- Kingdom: Animalia
- Phylum: Chordata
- Class: Reptilia
- Clade: Pseudosuchia
- Clade: Crocodylomorpha
- Clade: Mesoeucrocodylia
- Genus: †Trematochampsa; Buffetaut, 1974

Type species
- Trematochampsa taqueti Buffetaut, 1974

Extinct genus of reptiles

Trematochampsa is a dubious extinct genus of crocodyliform from the Late Cretaceous (Coniacian-Santonian age) In Beceten Formation of Niger.

== Taxonomy ==
The type species, T. taqueti, was described by Eric Buffetaut in 1974. A second species, T. oblita, was named from Madagascar in 1979, but was renamed Miadanasuchus in 2009.

Trematochampsa gives its name to the Trematochampsidae, a poorly known group of fossil crocodiles. However, the labile phylogenetic position of Trematochampsa in many studies has been attributed to character conflict, leading many authors to exclude this genus from many cladistic analyses, but Sertich et al. (2014) noted that the referred material of Trematochampsa consists of more than one crocodyliform taxon, so they opted to use only the cranial material in the dataset for the cladistic analysis of Rukwasuchus and recommended removing the postcranial material from Trematochampsa. The analysis recovered Trematochampsa as a member of Peirosauridae, rendering Trematochampsidae a junior synonym of Peirosauridae.

A 2018 revision of T. taqueti found that its fossil material was a mixture of bones from peirosaurids, Araripesuchus, Anatosuchus, Notosuchus-like crocodyliforms, and neosuchians. No distinguishing characteristics were found in the holotype specimen, a lacrimal bone, thus rendering the genus a nomen dubium.
