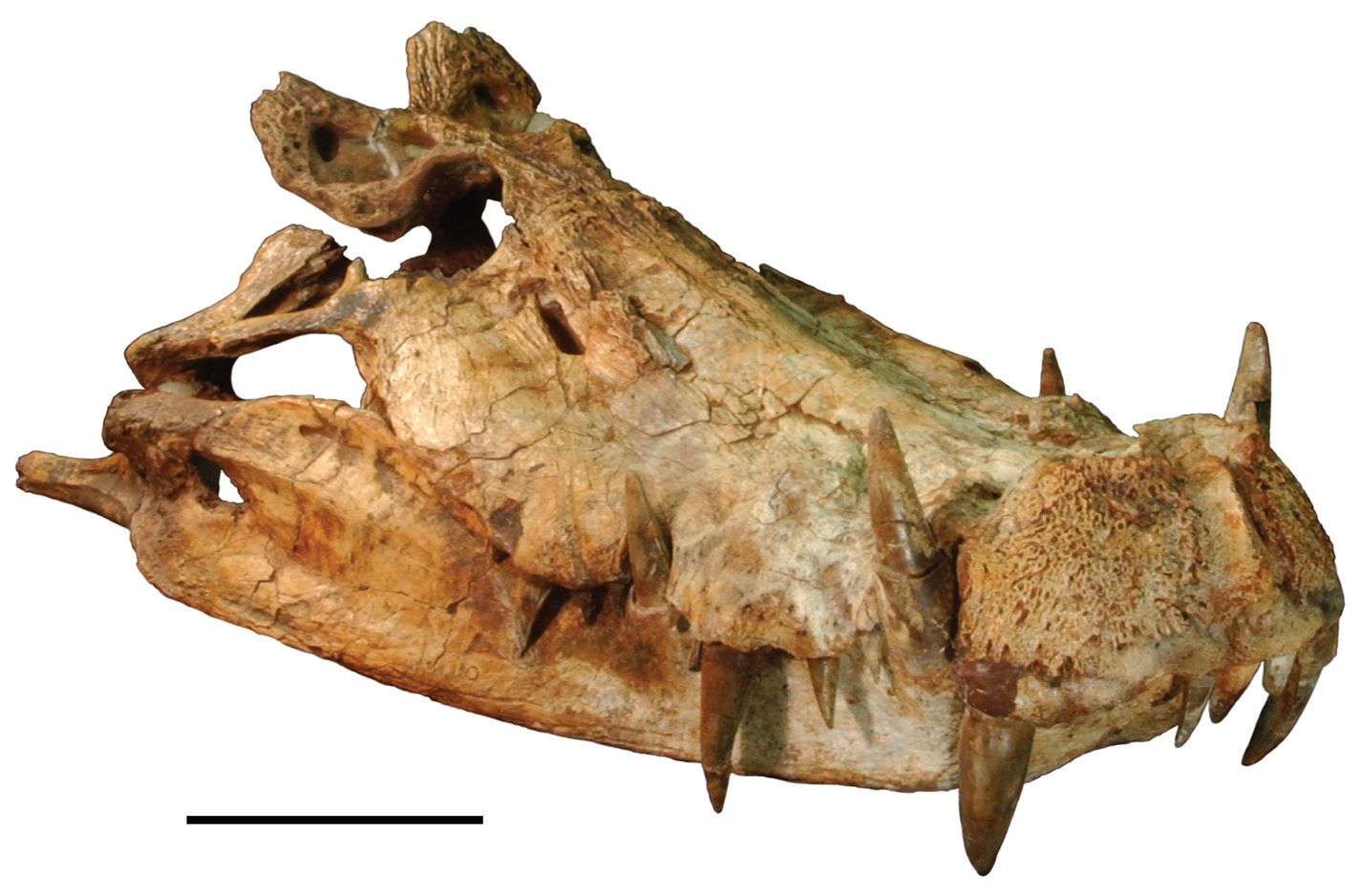
- Holotype skull, scale bar equals 10 cm

Scientific classification
- Kingdom: Animalia
- Phylum: Chordata
- Class: Reptilia
- Clade: Pseudosuchia
- Clade: Crocodylomorpha
- Clade: †Notosuchia
- Family: †Mahajangasuchidae
- Genus: †Kaprosuchus; Sereno and Larsson, 2009

Type species
- †Kaprosuchus saharicus Sereno and Larsson, 2009

= Kaprosuchus =

Kaprosuchus Temporal range: Late Cretaceous (Cenomanian), 95 Ma

Genus of crocodyliform from the Late Cretaceous period

Kaprosuchus is an extinct genus of mahajangasuchid crocodyliform. It is known from a single nearly complete skull collected from the Upper Cretaceous Echkar Formation of Niger. The name means "boar crocodile" from the Greek κάπρος, kapros ("boar") and σοῦχος, soukhos ("crocodile") in reference to its unusually large caniniform teeth which resemble those of a boar. It has been nicknamed "BoarCroc" by Paul Sereno and Hans Larsson, who first described the genus in a monograph published in ZooKeys in 2009 along with other Saharan crocodyliforms such as Anatosuchus and Laganosuchus. The type species is K. saharicus.

== Description ==
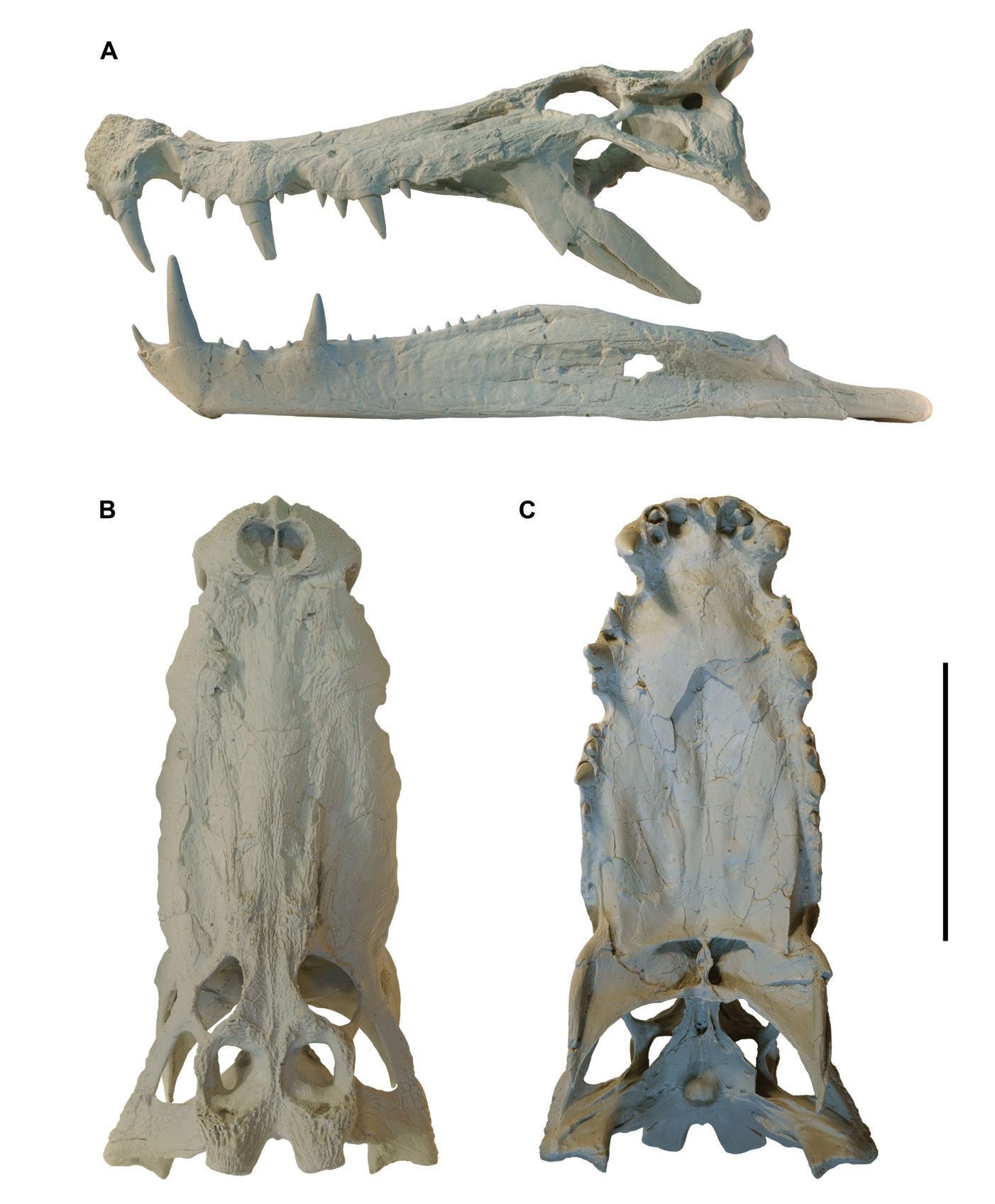
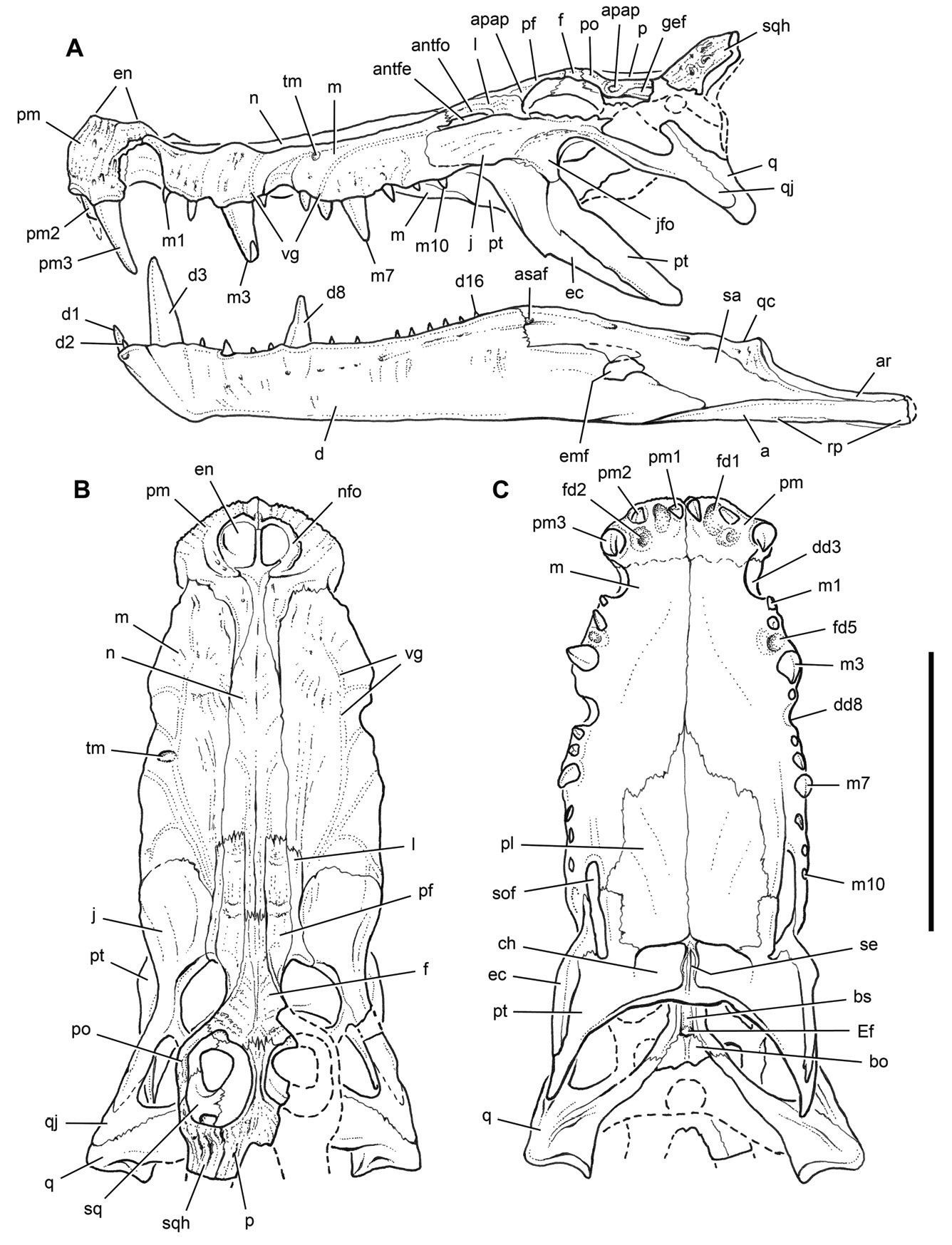
Skull in multiple views, with diagrams

Kaprosuchus is known from a nearly complete skull about 507 mm in length in which the lower jaw measured 603 mm long. Its total body length is estimated to be around 2.42–3.77 m (7 ft 11 in – 12 ft 4 in). It possesses three sets of tusk-like caniniform teeth that project above and below the skull, one of which in the lower jaw fits into notches in the upper jaw. This type of dentition is not seen in any other known crocodyliform. Another unique characteristic of Kaprosuchus is the presence of large, rugose horns formed from the squamosal and parietal bones that project posteriorly from the skull. Smaller projections are also seen in the closely related Mahajangasuchus.

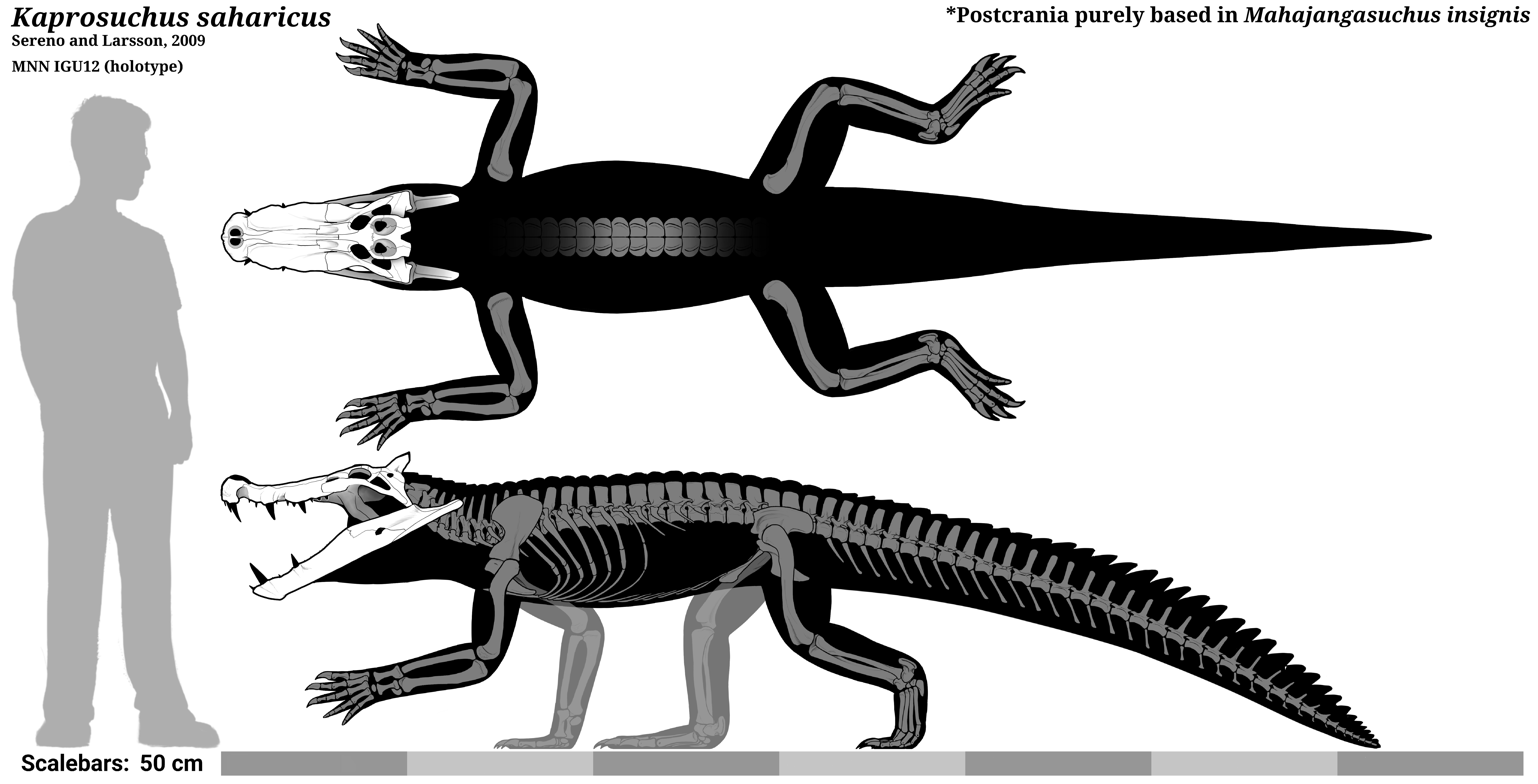
Size comparison, body based in the largely more complete Mahajangasuchus, its closest known relative.

The snout of Kaprosuchus shows generalized proportions and the naris is positioned dorsally. In Kaprosuchus many teeth are hypertrophied and labiolingually (laterally) compressed, unlike those of other crocodyliforms with similarly shallow snouts, which are usually subconical and of moderate length. Another difference between the skull of Kaprosuchus and those of other crocodyliforms that also possess dorsoventrally compressed snouts is the great depth of the posterior portion of the skull.

In Kaprosuchus, the orbits (i.e., eye sockets) open laterally and are angled slightly forward rather than upward. The orbits turned forward suggest that there was somewhat stereoscopic vision, i.e., an overlap in the visual field of the animal.

The surfaces of the premaxillae are rugose with the edges elevated above the body of the bone, suggesting that a keratinous shield would have been supported by the rugosities at the tip of the snout. Along the interpremaxillary suture, the area where the two premaxillae meet, the surface is smooth, giving the paired rugosity of the premaxillae the resemblance of a moustache in anterior view.

== Classification ==
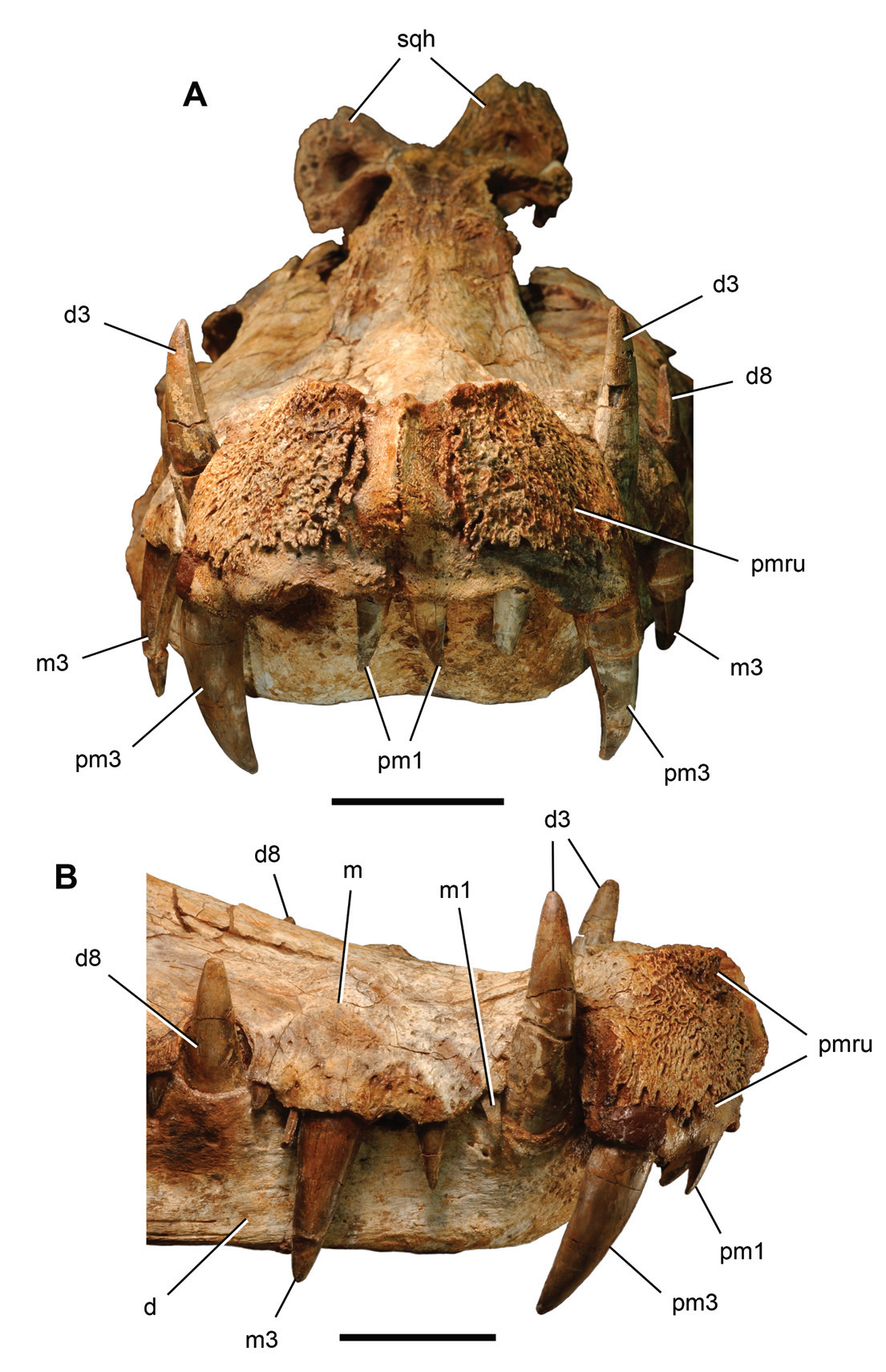
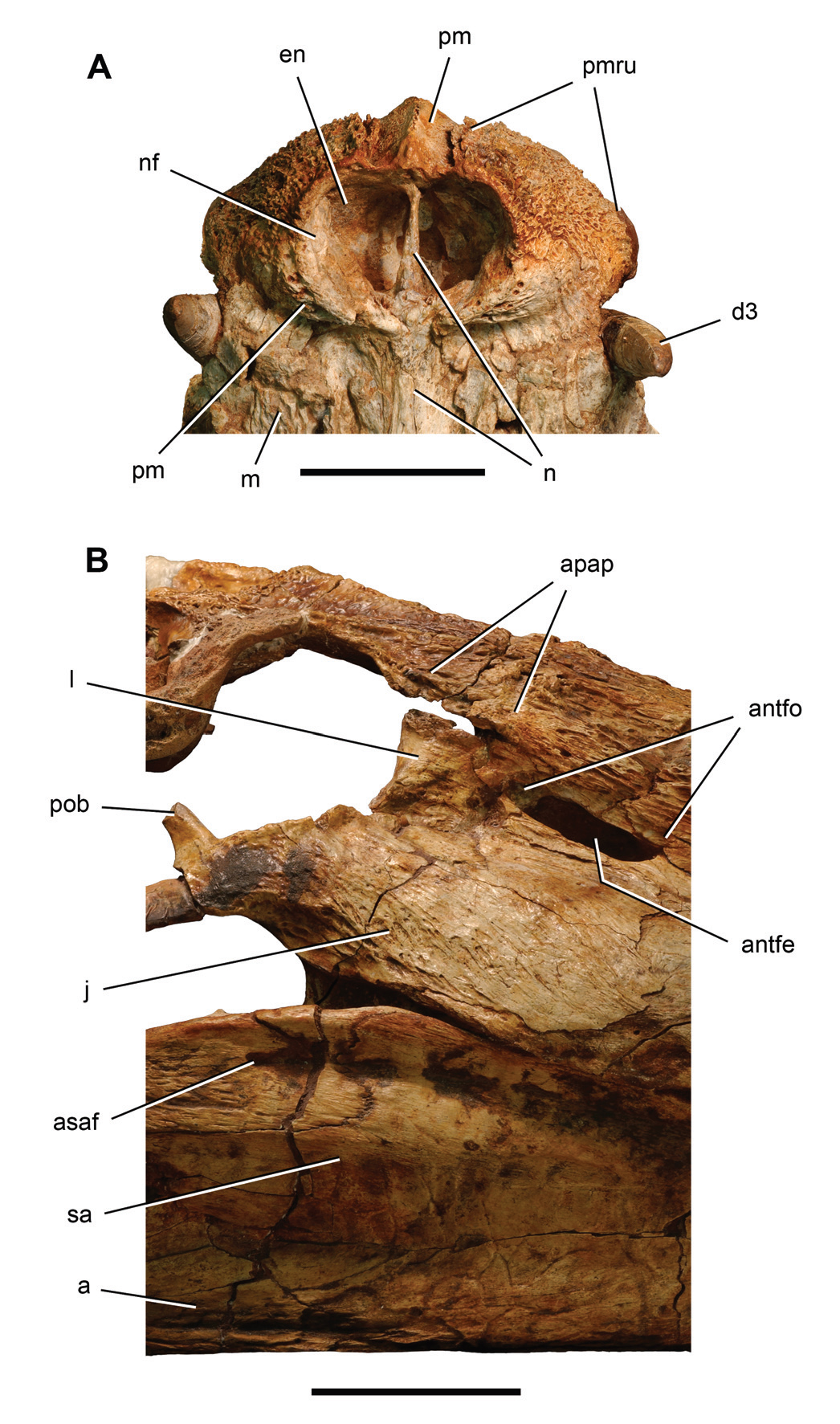
Details of the skull

Kaprosuchus is a member of the family Mahajangasuchidae along with closely related Mahajangasuchus insignis from the Upper Cretaceous of Madagascar. Although it differs greatly from any other known crocodyliform, Kaprosuchus shares several characteristics with Mahajangasuchus. These include the obliteration of all but the posterior portion of the internasal suture; a laterally facing rugose external articular fossa; the positioning of the jaw joint below the posterior maxillary teeth; a deep, anterodorsally oriented mandibular symphysis; a vertically descending ectopterygoid that is slightly inset from the lateral margin of the jugal; a flared choanal septum forming an articular foot for the palatine; and the hornlike dorsal projection of the external rim of the squamosal (although this is much more developed in Kaprosuchus than Mahajangasuchus).

At the time of Kaprosuchus' description, Sereno and Larrson considered mahajangasuchids to be a family of Neosuchian crocodyliforms. However further studies on the relationship of this family have repeatedly found them to form a sister clade to peirosaurids, forming a clade that in turn groups together with uruguaysuchids such as Anatosuchus and Araripesuchus as an early diverging branch of notosuchians.

- - Uruguaysuchidae
  - - Peirosauridae
    - - Mahajangasuchidae
        - Kaprosuchus
        - Mahajangasuchus

== Paleobiology ==
Kaprosuchus was once thought to have been a primarily if not exclusively terrestrial predator. Evidence for this behavior includes the positioning of the orbits laterally and somewhat anteriorly, which suggests an overlap in vision. This is unlike many other neosuchians, including extant crocodilians, in which the orbits are positioned dorsally as an adaptation to aquatic predation where the head can be held underwater while the eyes remain above the surface. Additional support for terrestrial predation can be found in the teeth and jaws. The enlarged caniniforms are sharp-edged and relatively straight, unlike the fluted, subconical, recurved teeth of aquatic crocodyliforms. Because the retroarticular process of the lower jaw is long, it is likely that the jaws were able to open relatively quickly with a large gape to allow for the opposing caniniforms to clear one another. The fused nasal bones are thought to have provided reinforcement for the jaws against compression associated with a powerful bite. The telescoped, dorsally positioned external nares are seen as protection against impact if the animal rammed prey with its robust snout. The keratinous shield thought to have covered the tip of the snout would have provided further protection.

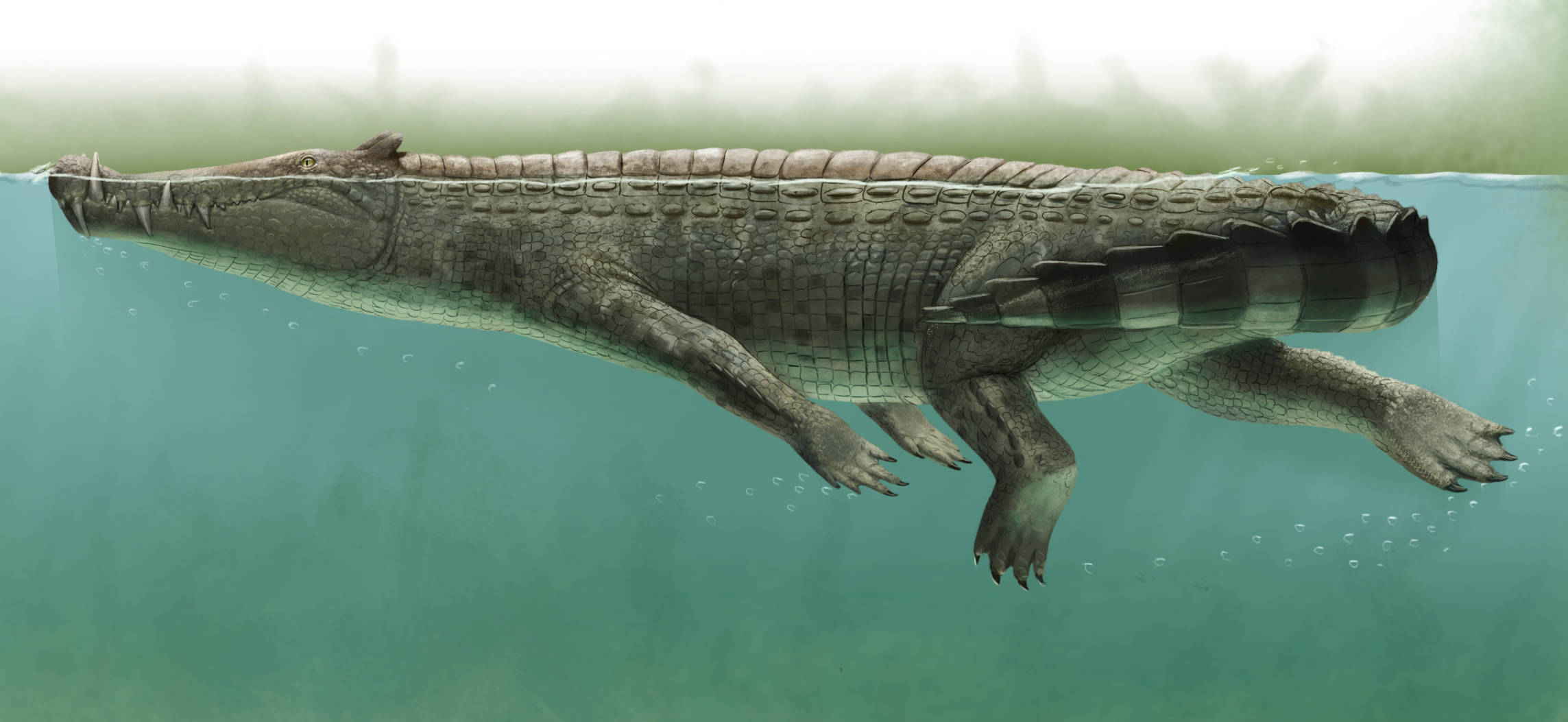
Life reconstruction as a semiaquatic animal

However, Kaprosuchus is now thought to have been semiaquatic, as the relative Mahajangasuchus has been suggested to be a primarily aquatic predator, and that the specimens of both genera show cranial adaptations usually found in "definitively semiaquatic" crocodylomorphs, "such as elongate platyrostral or tube-like snouts, orbits located dorsally on the skull, and/or dorsally-facing external nares."
