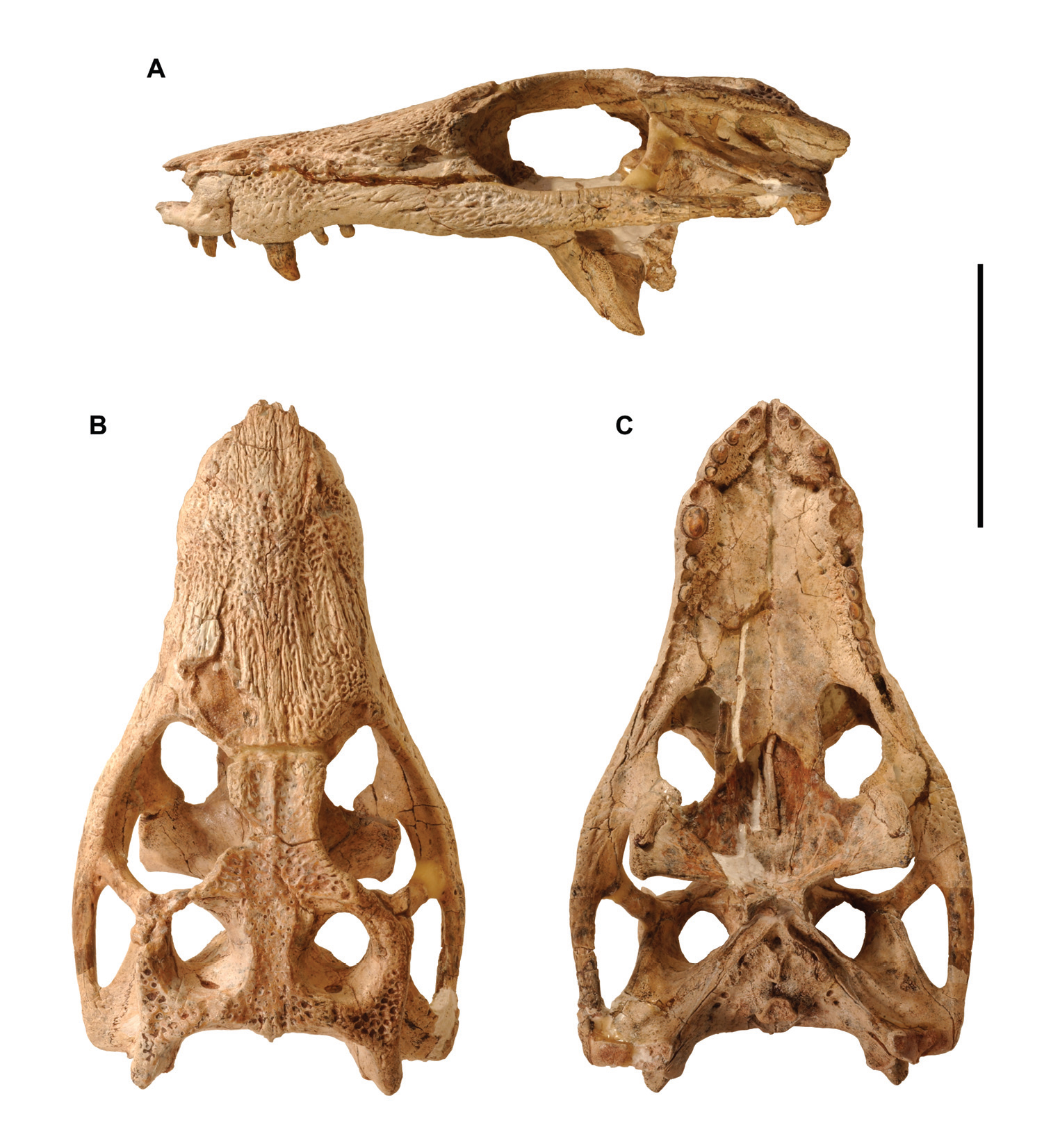
- Skull of A. wegeneri from different angles

Scientific classification
- Kingdom: Animalia
- Phylum: Chordata
- Class: Reptilia
- Clade: Pseudosuchia
- Clade: Crocodylomorpha
- Clade: †Notosuchia
- Family: †Uruguaysuchidae
- Genus: †Araripesuchus; Price, 1959

Species
- †A. gomesii Price, 1959 (type); †A. buitreraensis Pol & Apesteguia, 2005; †A. manzanensis Fernández Dumont et al., 2024; †A. patagonicus Ortega et al., 2000; †A. tsangatsangana Turner, 2006; †A. rattoides Sereno & Larsson, 2009; †A. wegeneri Buffetaut, 1981

= Araripesuchus =

Araripesuchus Temporal range: Early - Late Cretaceous, 125–66 Ma

Extinct genus of reptiles

Araripesuchus is a genus of extinct crocodyliform that existed during the Cretaceous period of the late Mesozoic era some 125 to 66 million years ago. Araripesuchus is generally considered to be a notosuchian (belonging to the clade Mesoeucrocodylia), characterized by the varied teeth types and distinct skull elements. Seven species have been referred to Araripesuchus, though it has been argued that the phylogenetic position of this genus is uncertain, and that taxonomic revision is required.

== Discovery and history ==
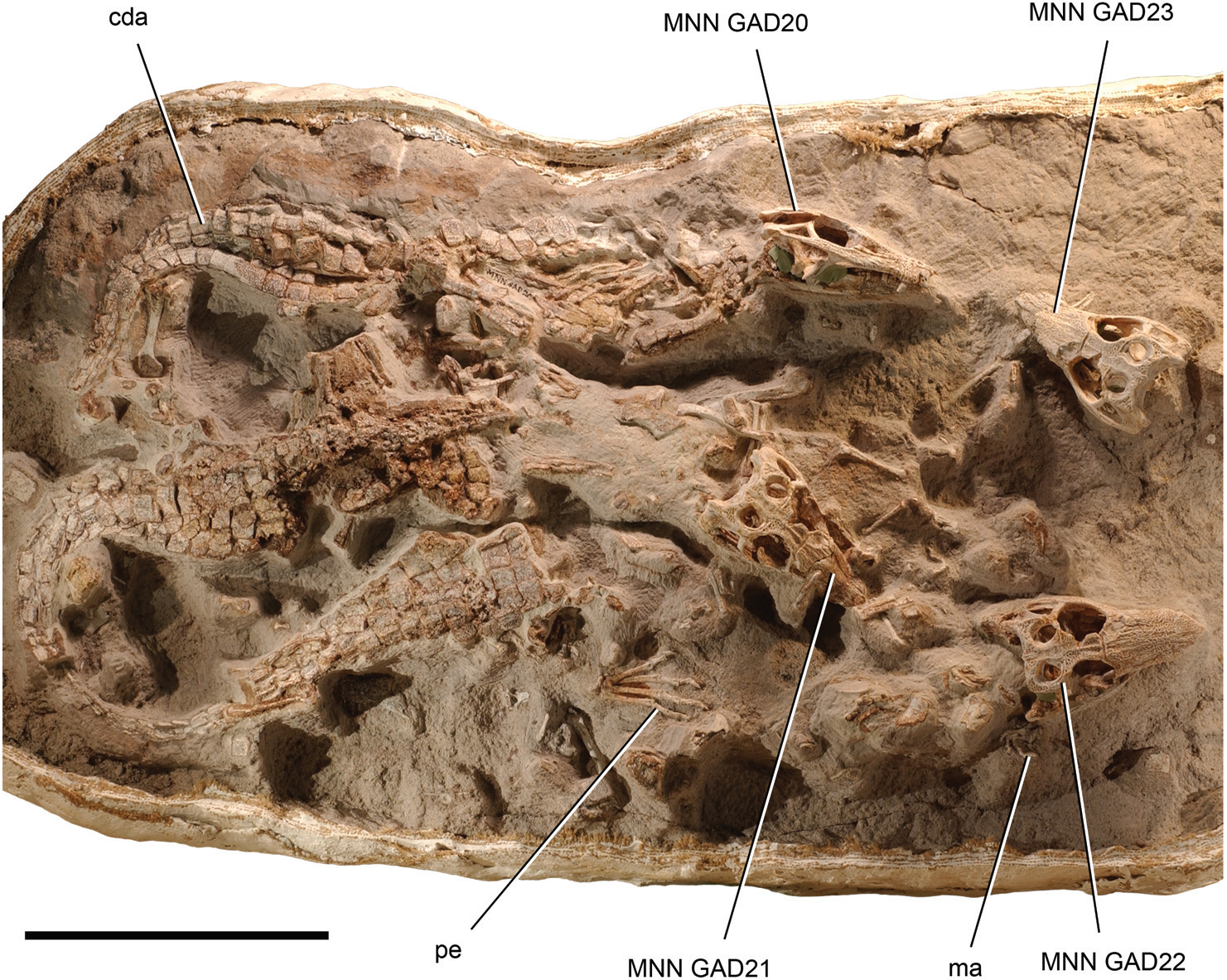
Block containing multiple specimens of A. wegeneri

The name of the genus was coined in 1959 with the description of the type species Araripesuchus gomesii, a notosuchian crocodylian from the famed Santana Group of the Araripe Basin in Brazil. The holotype used to describe the genus, 423-R is currently in the care of the Divisão de Mineralogia e Geologia do Departamento Nacional da Produção Mineral in Rio de Janeiro. 423-R consists of a single skull articulating with part of a lower jaw. A more complete specimen, AMNH 24450 is held by the American Museum of Natural History. A second species, A. wegeneri was described in 1981. This species was discovered from Early Cretaceous deposits of Niger on the African continent, as opposed to the South American paleodistribution of the other species in the genus. The type specimen for the species, GDF-700 consisting of a few, fragmentary jaw elements, reside at the Museum National d'Histoire Naturelle in Paris. The holotype's fragmentary nature meant that its placement in the genus was disputed until more remains were found in 2009 by Sereno and Larsson; these, along with the specimens of A. tsangatsangana, confirmed its place.

Araripesuchus patagonicus was described from a patagonian specimen (MUC-PV 269) in 2000. Another species to be assigned to the genus was Araripesuchus buitreraensis, described in 2005. This species was described from a single skull (MPCA-PV 235) retrieved from the Candeleros Formation in what is now Argentina. At 130 millimeters, the skull is the largest Araripesuchus specimen discovered to date. A fifth species, Araripesuchus tsangatsangana was described in 2006. This species' type specimen was discovered from latest Late Cretaceous deposits from the African island of Madagascar. Analysis of this specimen solidifies the position of A. wegneri as a member of the genus. A. tsangatsangana is the geologically youngest known of this genus. The sixth species, A. rattoides, was found in the Kem Kem Beds of the Sahara in a similar location to the specimens of A. wegeneri found by Sereno and Larsson, and is known only from parts of dentary bones, up to the fourteenth alveolus. It was described in the same paper as Kaprosuchus, Laganosuchus and Anatosuchus; the four were therefore popularized by the authors as 'RatCroc', 'BoarCroc', 'PancakeCroc' and 'DuckCroc' respectively.

== Description ==
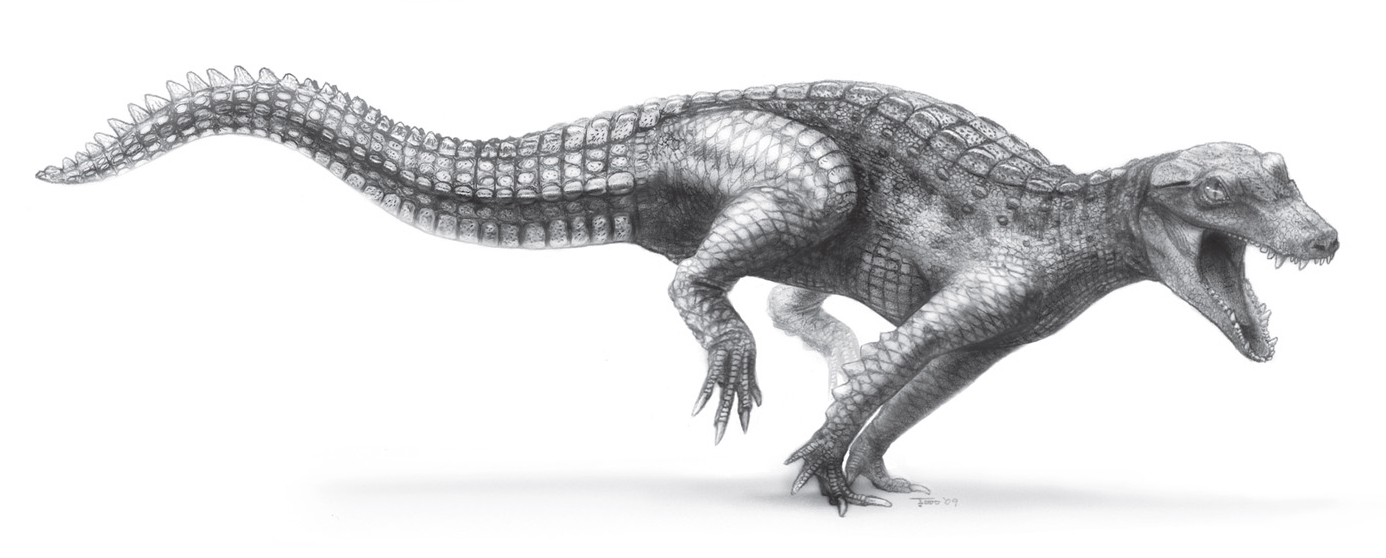
Restoration of an adult A. wegeneri

A. wegeneri is estimated to reach 81 centimetres (32 in) long while A. rattoides is estimated to reach up to 1 metre (3.3 ft). Araripesuchus can be distinguished by their laterally bulged edges of the snout, with the bulge being the most prominent around the area of an enlarged maxillary tooth. The snout and premaxilla are also smoother than that of most crocodyliforms, without foramina or the typical rugose texture. There are seven valid species within this genus, all with slightly differing maxillary or dentary structure. A. gomesii, A. wegeneri and A. tsangatsangana all have a mild concavity of the external alveolar margin of the premaxilla as viewed from the ventral surface; A. rattoides may also have this feature, although this part of its skull is not known, as the dentary suggests that this would be the case. A. rattoides also had the distinctive feature of a highly enlarged and forward-pointing first dentary tooth referred to as an incisiform, resembling the elongated incisors found in rodents (hence the specific epithet).

All species of Araripesuchus had relatively large orbits and hence eyes. They also had thin osteoderms that covered the entire body, multiple rows of them across the back and paired dorsal ones along the tail. Each side of the tail also had a single row of osteoderms, and there were paired ventral osteoderms across most of the belly and underside as well. The osteoderms were not strongly keeled, which, along with the long limb bones and shoulder, hip and ankle joints that suggest upright posture, indicate that Araripesuchus was probably more active on land than on water.

== Classification ==
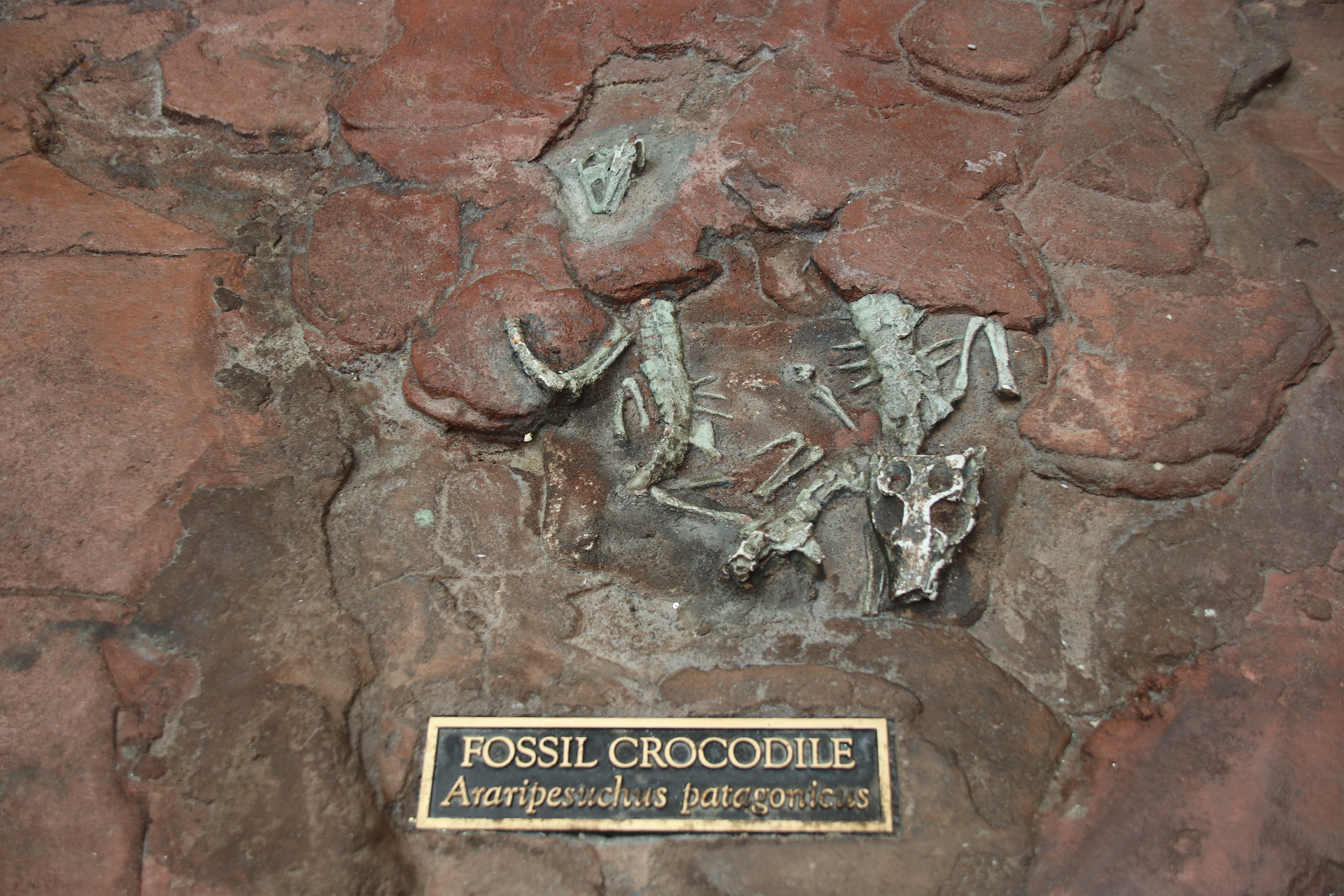
Cast of A. patagonicus fossils

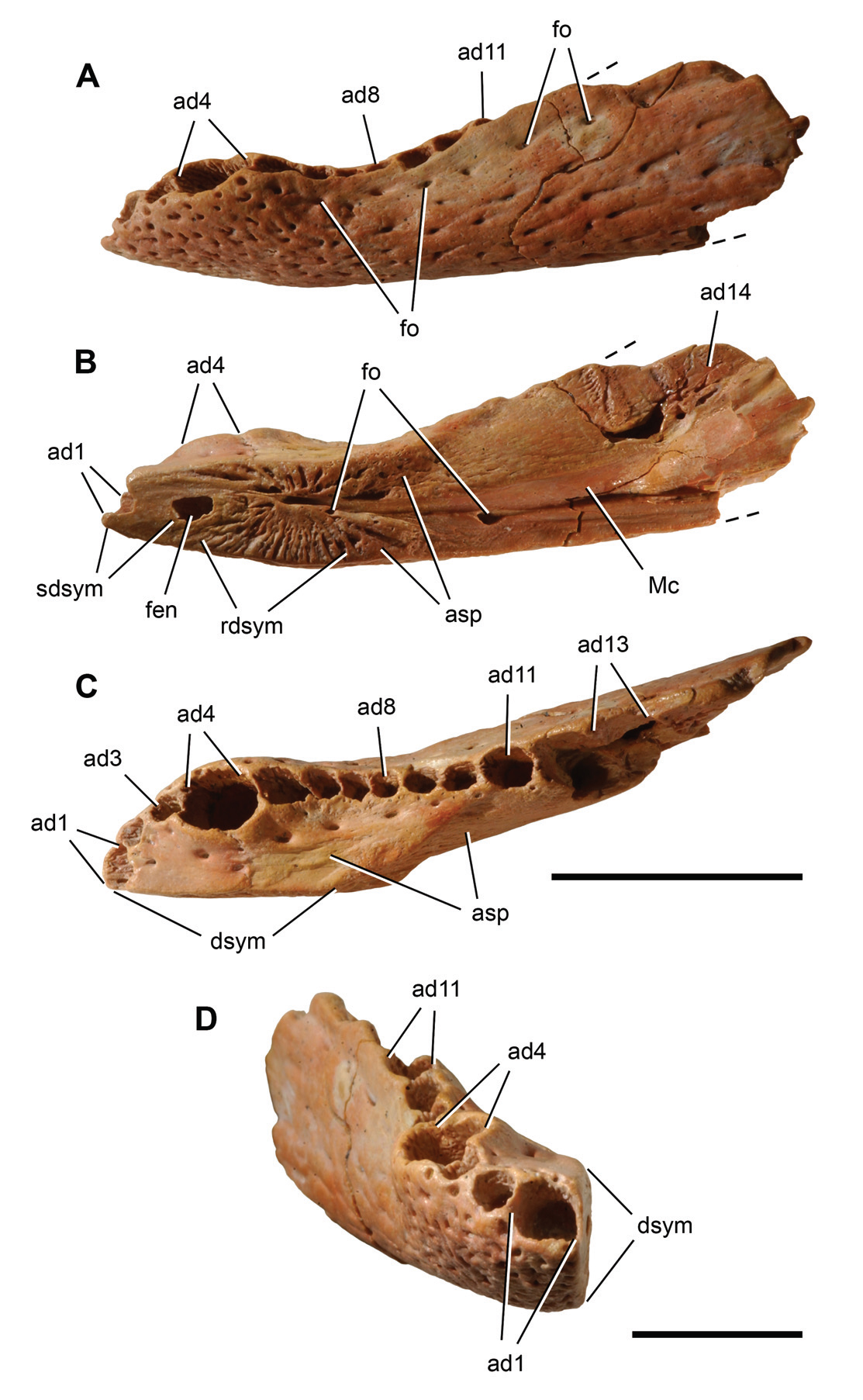
Holotype right dentary of A. rattoides

As of 2024, seven species were recognized within the genus Araripesuchus: A. gomesii (type species), A. buitreraensis, A. manzanensis, A. patagonicus, A. rattoides, A. tsangatsangana and A. wegeneri. The placement of the first African species discovered, A. wegeneri, was questioned for a while by various authors. Ortega et al. argued for the assignment of the errant species to another genus based on phylogenetic analysis. Further analysis, combined with the discovery of the second African species A. tsangatsangana has shed more light on the placement of A. wegeneri within the genus. When analyzed together, the African species support the inclusion of all five first described species into the same genus.

The genus was originally assigned by Price to the family Uruguaysuchidae in the original 1959 description. This classification was followed by Buffetaut in 1981 with the description of A. wegeneri also within the same family. However, in their 2000 description of A. patagonicus, Ortega et al. avoided placing the species within the family. Instead, it was simply noted that Uruguaysuchus was a possible close relative of the genus.

Ortega et al. and several other studies place Araripesuchus outside Notosuchia. In some phylogenetic analyses, it is placed closer to the clade Neosuchia, which includes modern crocodilians. In most recent analyses, however, Araripesuchus is placed as a basal notosuchian. The phylogenetic analysis of Soto et al. (2011) joined Araripesuchus with Uruguaysuchus, reinstating the family Uruguaysuchidae. This family was found to be the most basal group of Notosuchia. Below is a cladogram from the analysis:

- Notosuchia
  - Uruguaysuchidae
    - Uruguaysuchus
    - Araripesuchus
      - A. wegeneri
      - - A. buitreraensis
        - - A. gomesii
          - A. patagonicus
  - Ziphosuchia
    - Libycosuchus
    - - Simosuchus
      - - - Malawisuchus
          - Candidodon
        - - - Chimaerasuchus
            - Sphagesaurus
          - - Baurusuchus
            - - Bretesuchus
              - Iberosuchus
        - - Notosuchus
          - - Comahuesuchus
            - Mariliasuchus

However, recent phylogenetic analyses placed A. wegeneri as a sister taxon of Anatosuchus, questioning the monophyly of the genus. Lumping all species into one genus would lead to Uruguaysuchus taking priority, rendering Araripesuchus a junior synonym of Uruguaysuchus.

== Evolution ==
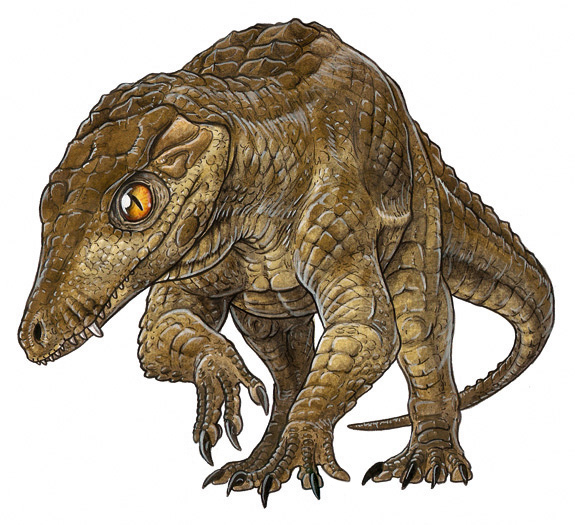
Restoration of A. patagonicus

Araripesuchus remains have been recovered from the continents of South America and Africa suggesting a Gondwanan origin for the evolution of the genus. At around the time of Araripesuchus' existence, South America and Africa were physically adjacent to each other. The various species evolved from the same stock in the general area, radiating outward from a yet-unidentified origin point. The presence of specimens from Madagascar further strengthens this evolutionary radiation model.

== Palaeobiology ==
=== Ontogeny ===
Osteohistological study of a specimen of Araripesuchus cf. buitreraensis has found that it grew slowly over its lifetime, with it experiencing annual interruptions to its growth as evidenced by distinctly visible lines of arrested growth.
