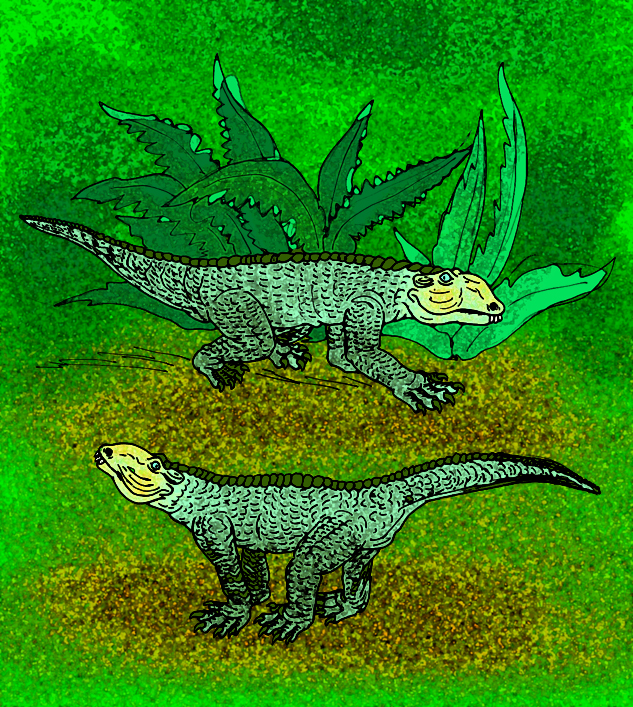
- Chimaerasuchus paradoxus

Scientific classification
- Kingdom: Animalia
- Phylum: Chordata
- Class: Reptilia
- Clade: Archosauria
- Clade: Pseudosuchia
- Clade: Crocodylomorpha
- Clade: †Notosuchia
- Clade: †Xenodontosuchia
- Family: †Chimaerasuchidae; Carvalho et al., 2004

Genera
- †Chimaerasuchus; †Simosuchus?

= Chimaerasuchidae =

Chimaerasuchidae Temporal range: Early Cretaceous, 120 Ma

Extinct family of reptiles

Chimaerasuchidae ("Chimera crocodiles") is a family of mesoeucrocodylians. It was erected as a clade in 2004 by Carvalho et al and included Chimaerasuchus from the Early Cretaceous of China and possibly also Simosuchus from the Late Cretaceous of Madagascar. The validity of the clade has been questioned in later studies that found the two genera to be more distantly related.

== Phylogeny ==
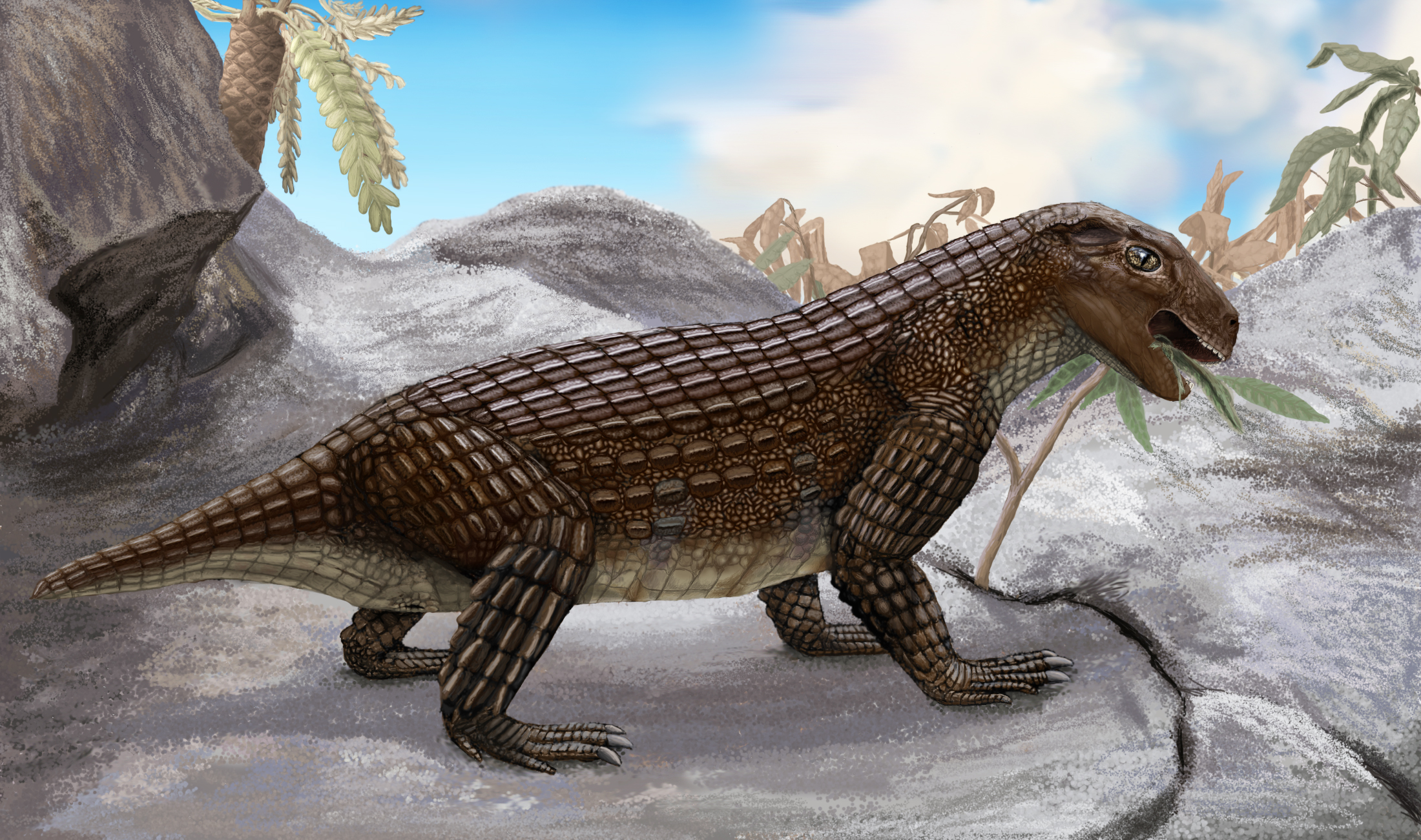
The possible genus Simosuchus

In the phylogenetic analysis of Carvalho et al, the family contained Chimaerasuchus and Simosuchus, two genera of small (~1 metre long), possibly herbivorous crocodyliforms from the Cretaceous. Both had short-snouted heads with multicusped teeth. Carvalho et al placed Chimaerasuchidae within a new clade of mesoeucrocodylians called Gondwanasuchia. It was the sister taxon of Notosuchimorpha, another newly erected clade that contained notosuchians, sebecosuchians, and peirosaurids. Below is a modified cladogram from Carvalho et al (2004):

- Gondwanasuchia
  - Chimaerasuchidae
    - Chimaerasuchus
    - Simosuchus
  - 1
    - Stolokrosuchus
    - 2
      - Uruguaysuchidae
      - 3
        - Comahuesuchus
        - Notosuchia
          - Ziphosuchia
          - 4
            - Candidodontidae
            - 5
              - Araripesuchus
              - Peirosauroidea
                - Itasuchidae
                  - Malawisuchus
                  - Itasuchus
                - Peirosauridae
  1 Notosuchimorpha, 2 Notosuchiformes,
  3 Terriasuchia, 4 Peirosaurimorpha,
  5 Peirosauriformes

The Carvalho et al. (2004) paper phylogeny did not include neosuchians in the analysis. Neosuchians and notosuchians are the two major clades of mesoeucrocodylians. When neosuchians are included in analyses with Simosuchus and Chimaerasuchus, the two genera do not appear as sister taxa (Pol 2003; Candeiro & Martinelli 2006). In fact Chimaerasuchus has been found to be the sister taxon of Sphagesaurus. Sphagesaurus is often assigned its own family, Sphagesauridae. If Chimaerasuchus belongs to Shagesauridae, Chimaerasuchidae would be a junior synonym of Sphagesauridae. This is because Sphagesauridae was named before Chimaerasuchidae, and under ICZN rules, the oldest name has priority.

In a recent contribution, Marinho & Carvalho (2007) did a revision of Sphagesauridae and noticed that Chimaerasuchus does not have any of the synapomorphies of this family that was originally erected by Kuhn (1968). In this new paper, the authors propose an emended diagnosis for the Sphagesauridae, pointing new synapomorphies for this taxon and propose that the Chimaerasuchidae would be a valid family in spite of the poor phylogenetic analysis of Carvalho et al. (2004) paper.
