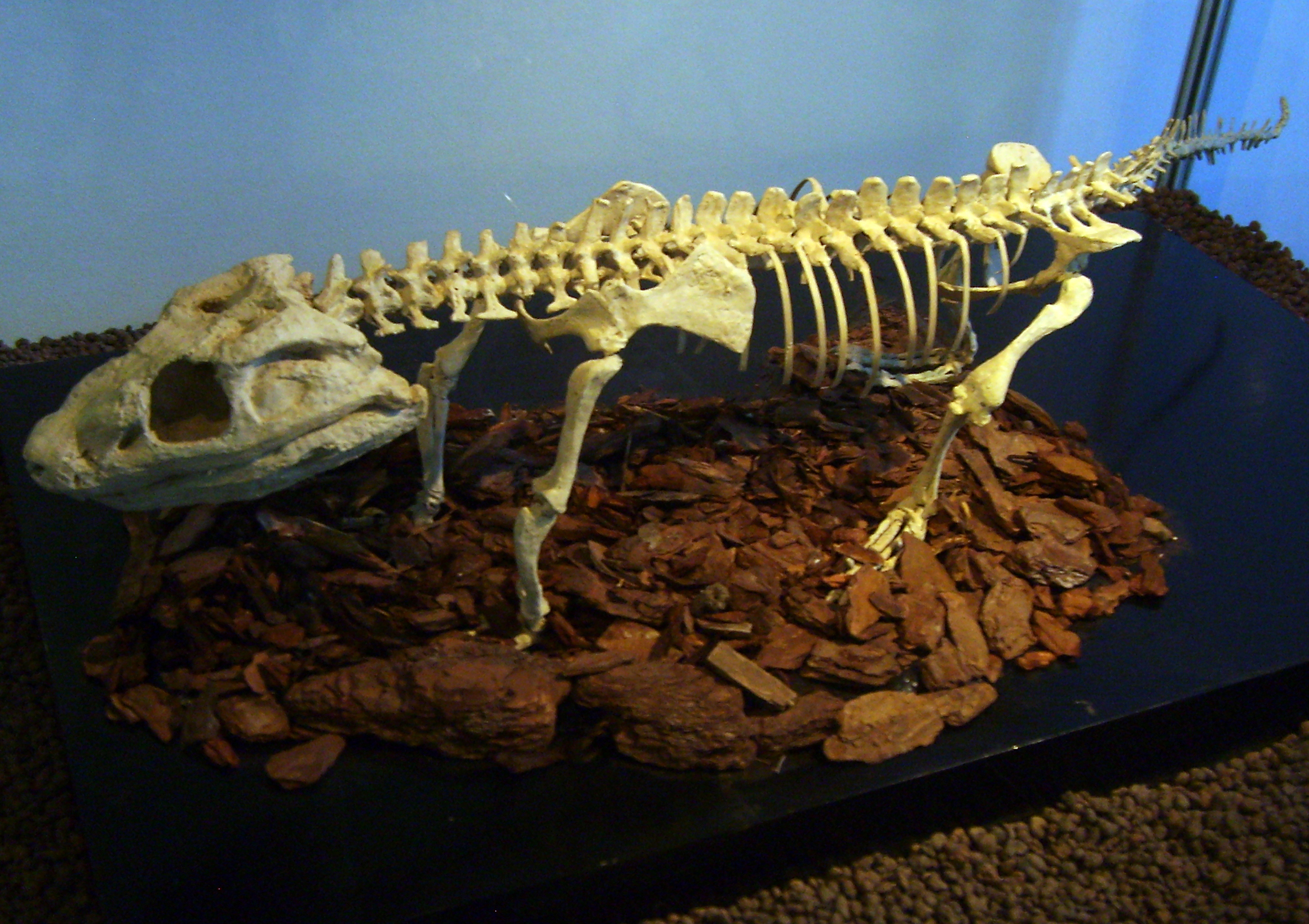
- Reconstructed skeleton of Comahuesuchus brachybuccalis

Scientific classification
- Kingdom: Animalia
- Phylum: Chordata
- Class: Reptilia
- Clade: Archosauria
- Clade: Pseudosuchia
- Clade: Crocodylomorpha
- Clade: †Notosuchia
- Family: †Comahuesuchidae; Bonaparte, 1991

Genera
- Comahuesuchus; ?Anatosuchus

= Comahuesuchidae =

Comahuesuchidae Temporal range: ?Early Cretaceous - Late Cretaceous

Extinct family of reptiles

Comahuesuchidae is a family of notosuchian crocodyliforms. Constructed in 1991, it includes the genera Comahuesuchus and Anatosuchus. Among the characteristics that are unique to this family is an external naris that is inset into the tip of the snout. There is also a diastema, or gap between the teeth, at the tip of the upper and lower jaws. Both Anatosuchus and Comahuesuchus have maxillary tooth rows in the upper jaw that extend out and over the dentary tooth rows of the lower jaw.

Several recent phylogenetic analyses of notosuchians have placed Anatosuchus outside of Notosuchia altogether, and therefore outside Comahuesuchidae. If this is true, Comahuesuchus would be the only member of Comahuesuchidae.
