= Paul Sereno =

American paleontologist (born 1957)

Paul C. Sereno
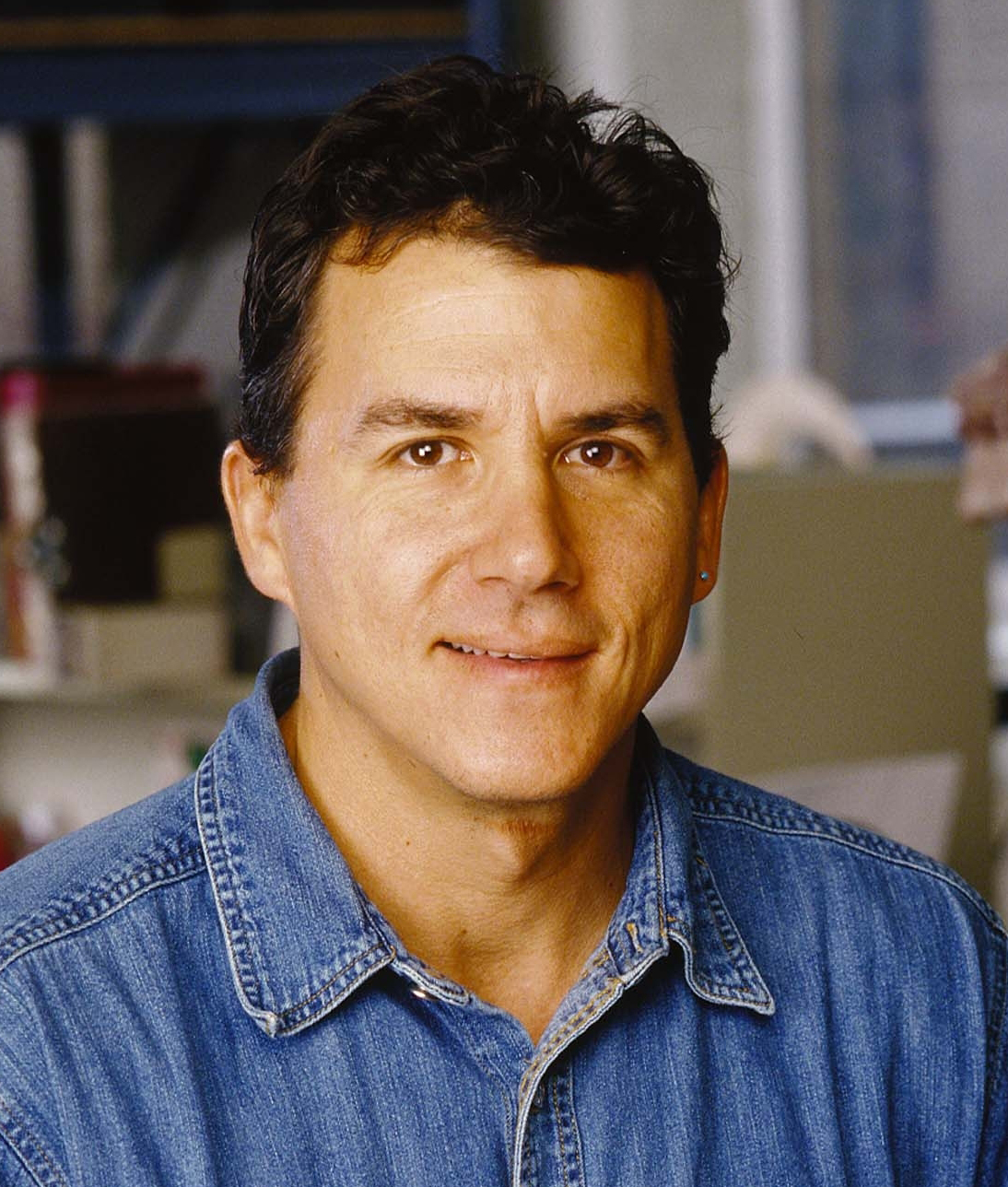
- Sereno in 2010
- Born: October 11, 1957 (age 69); Aurora, Illinois, U.S.
- Education: Northern Illinois University (B.S., Biological Sciences, 1979); Columbia University (M.A., Vertebrate Paleontology, 1981; M. Phil., Geological Sciences, 1981; Ph.D., Geological Sciences, 1987)
- Known for: Discoveries in paleontology; founder of Project Exploration
- Children: 2
- Scientific career
- Fields: Paleontology (vertebrate)
- Workplaces: University of Chicago
- Doctoral students: Jeffrey A. Wilson
- Author abbrev. (zoology): Sereno

Paul Callistus Sereno (born October 11, 1957) is a professor of paleontology at the University of Chicago who has discovered several new dinosaur species on several continents, including at sites in Inner Mongolia, Argentina, Morocco and Niger. One of his widely publicized discoveries includes a nearly complete specimen of Sarcosuchus imperator commonly referred to as SuperCroc, sail-backed spinosaurids Suchomimusand Spinosaurus.Widely publicized archaeological finds were made at Gobero, a site he discovered preserving intact burials from prehistoric cultures living in a formerly Green Sahara.

== Biography ==
=== Youth and education ===
The son of a mail carrier and a celebrated art teacher in elementary schools in the Chicago suburb of Naperville, Illinois, Sereno graduated from Naperville Central High School in 1975. Aiming to be a studio artist, he enrolled later that year as an undergraduate at Northern Illinois University in DeKalb, Illinois. In 1978 during his junior year, a trip to the American Museum of Natural History in New York changed the course of his career.

== Academic career ==
=== Early career ===
In 1979 Sereno entered Columbia University as a graduate student with office space at the American Museum of Natural History. In 1984, he conducted an 8-month research expedition abroad to study dinosaur evolution for his dissertation. This work took him to the Flaming Cliffs of Outer Mongolia, a site previously explored by Roy Chapman Andrews in the 1920s, where dinosaur eggs and Velociraptor fossils had been discovered.

In 1987 Sereno received a Ph.D. degree in Geological Sciences from Columbia University, his dissertation focusing on the parrot-beaked dinosaur Psittacosaurus and the evolution of ornithischian dinosaurs. While working on his dissertation he was under the supervision of Gene Gaffney and Malcolm McKenna.

=== Teaching ===
Sereno taught human anatomy to medical students. He also taught Dinosaur Science, a class that included field trips to the Bighorn Mountains of Wyoming. During these field trips, Sereno discovered a subadult Tyrannosaurus rex skeleton and a dinosaur mummy zone. Sereno taught another course, From Fossils to Fermi's Paradox, which featured university scholars discussing evidence for the evolution of intelligence on Earth and the possibility of intelligence elsewhere.

== Research ==
2014 VOA report about Spinosaurus with interview of Sereno

Sereno's research combines insights into the morphology of fossils with an artistic background that facilitates visualization in two and three dimensions using artistic renderings, surface and computed tomographic scans and animation. Well-illustrated papers describe new dinosaurs and more distant species and new methodologies for documenting the past.

== Science learning and civic engagement ==
=== Science learning ===
In 1998, Sereno co-founded Project Exploration, a non-profit science education organization. In 2021, Sereno founded the Scitopia Foundation, a non-profit science education organization. Scitopia Chicago, the foundation's flagship institution, launched on the south side of Chicago in 2026.

Scitopia Chicago offers science programs and labs for teens conducted outside school hours. The facility houses multiple civic institutions on a single site, including a library, community center, conservatory, zoo, aquarium, and museum.

== Civic engagement ==
=== Fossil Lab ===
In the 1940s, the University of Chicago closed its Walker Museum, which had housed collections of recent and fossil specimens and a fossil preparation laboratory. In 2024, Sereno opened a fossil laboratory with 6,000 square feet in the adjacent Washington Park neighborhood.

== Extinct taxa described by Sereno or his team ==
=== Dinosaurs ===
- Aerosteon
- Afrovenator
- Significant new material of Carcharodontosaurus, including Carcharodontosaurus iguidensis)
- Deltadromeus
- Eocarcharia
- Eodromaeus
- Eoraptor
- Erliansaurus
- Graciliceratops
- Significant new material of Herrerasaurus
- Jobaria
- Kryptops
- Neimongosaurus
- Nigersaurus
- Pegomastax
- Three new species of Psittacosaurus (P. meileyingensis, P. xinjiangensis, P. gobiensis)
- Rajasaurus
- Raptorex
- Rugops
- Significant new material of Spinosaurus aegyptiacus
- Spinosaurus mirabilis
- Significant new material of Sinornithomimus.
- Spinostropheus
- Suchomimus

=== Other fossil reptiles ===
- Marasuchus, an early relative of dinosaurs
- "Afrotapejara Zouhri"
- Sarcosuchus imperator
- Anatosuchus minor from Niger
- Araripesuchus rattoides from Niger and Morocco
- Kaprosuchus saharicus from Niger and Morocco
- Laganosuchus thaumastos from Niger and Morocco
- Laganosuchus maghrebensis from Niger and Morocco

== Documentaries featuring Sereno and his discoveries ==
In addition to his many discoveries in the field, public communication has been a big part of Sereno's career.

Year	Title	Producer	Featured Fossils (Sites)
1991	At the Forefront	Kurtis Productions, Ltd., PBS	
1992	Fragments of Time	New Explorers, PBS	Eoraptor (Argentina)
1992	The Dinosaurs! - Flesh on the Bones	WHYY-TV, PBS	Herrerasaurus (Argentina)
1993	The Next Generation, 1% Inspiration	WNET, PBS	
1994	Skeletons in the Sand	New Explorers, PBS	(Niger)
1995	Paleoworld - African Graveyard, Part I: Hunting Dinosaurs	The Learning Channel	(Morocco)
1995	Paleoworld - African Graveyard, Part II: Discovering Dinosaurs	The Learning Channel	(Morocco)
1996	Paleoworld - Flesh on the Bones	The Learning Channel	Deltadromeus, Carcharodontosaurus (Morocco)
1997	Beyond T-Rex	Discovery Channel	Carcharodontosaurus (Morocco)
1998	Colossal Claw	National Geographic Explorer	Suchomimus (Sahara)
1998	Dinosaur Fever	National Geographic Explorer	sauropods (Niger)
1999	Africa's Dinosaur Giants	National Geographic Explorer	Jobaria (Niger)
2001	SuperCroc	NBC/NGC	Sarcosuchus
2006	Sky Monsters	NGC	pterosaur (Niger)
2009	Bizarre Dinos	NGC	Nigersaurus, Raptorex, Mykocephale
2009	When Crocs Ate Dinosaurs	NGChannel	BoarCroc, PancakeCroc, DuckCroc, DogCroc, RatCroc (Sahara, Australia)
2013	Skeletons of the Sahara	NOVA-NGTelevision	humans (Gobero, Niger)
2014	Bigger than T. rex	NOVA-NGTelevision	Spinosaurus (Morocco)
