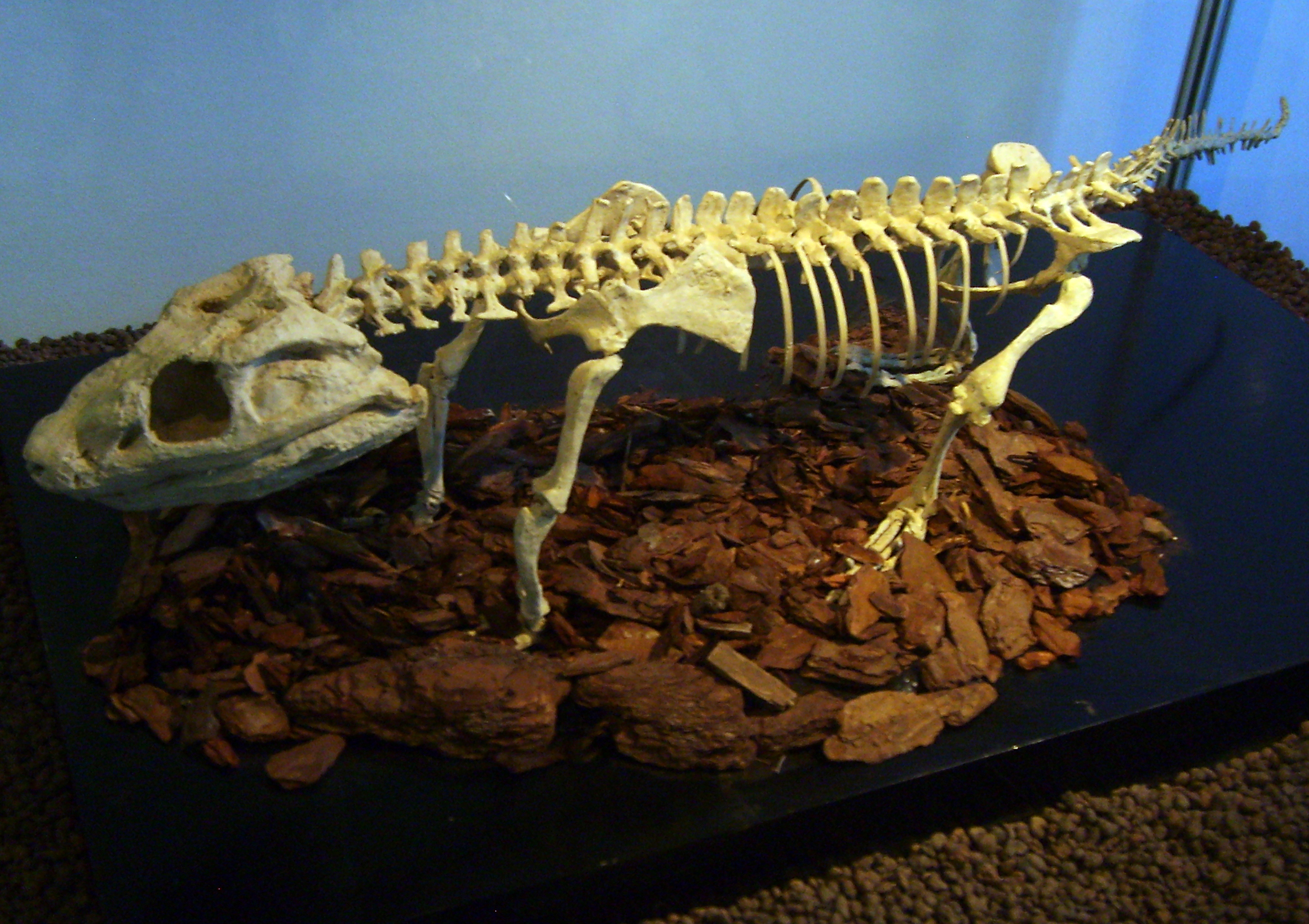
- Skeleton cast

Scientific classification
- Kingdom: Animalia
- Phylum: Chordata
- Class: Reptilia
- Clade: Archosauria
- Clade: Pseudosuchia
- Clade: Crocodylomorpha
- Clade: †Notosuchia
- Family: †Comahuesuchidae
- Genus: †Comahuesuchus; Bonaparte, 1991

Species
- †C. brachybuccalis Bonaparte, 1991 (type); †C. bonapartei Kellner et al., 2023

= Comahuesuchus =

Comahuesuchus Temporal range: Santonian 85 Ma

Extinct genus of reptiles

Comahuesuchus is an extinct genus of notosuchian crocodylomorphs from the late Cretaceous of Argentina. It was described by palaeontologist José Bonaparte in 1991. The type species is C. brachybuccalis from the Santonian Bajo de la Carpa Formation. In 2023 another species, C. bonapartei from the Sierra Barrosa Formation and Portezuelo Formation, was assigned to the genus.

== Classification ==
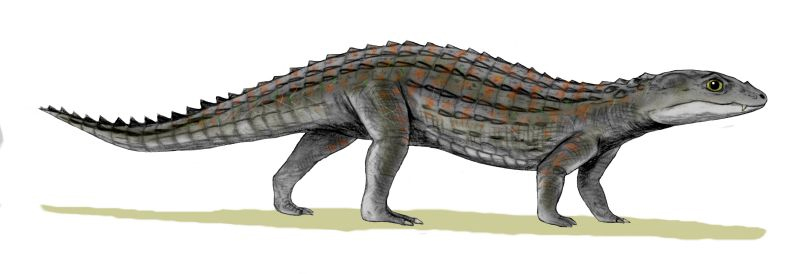
Restoration

The holotype of C. brachybuccalis is MUCPv-202. Comahuesuchus is the name-sake of the clade Comahuesuchidae. Sereno et al. (2003) suggested that Comahuesuchus and Anatosuchus are both comahuesuchids, but work by Martinelli and Andrade et al. (2006) has suggested that A. minor is not a comahuesuchid. Comahuesuchus seems instead to be more closely related to Mariliasuchus.
