= American Museum =

American Museum may refer to:

- American Museum of Radio and Electricity, now the SPARK Museum of Electrical Invention, Bellingham, Washington
- American Museum of Natural History, Central Park West at 79th Street, New York City, established 1869
- American Museum of the Moving Image, Astoria, Queens, New York City, opened 1988
- American Museum of Magic, Marshall, Michigan (collection of Harry Blackstone, Sr.), opened 1978
- American Museum of Science and Energy (previously American Museum of Atomic Energy, renamed 1978), Oak Ridge, Tennessee, founded 1949
- American Museum and Gardens, Claverton Manor, near Bath, Somerset, England, founded 1961
- Barnum's American Museum (formerly Scudder's American Museum), Broadway and Ann Street, New York City, 1841–1865
- Musée américain, a pre-Columbian art section of the Louvre, Paris, 1851-1887
- The American Museum (magazine), an 18th-century American magazine, published by Matthew Carey, in Philadelphia, Pennsylvania, January 1787 to December 1792
- The American Museum, a 19th-century American magazine published by Nathan C. Brooks of Baltimore

== See also ==
- Japanese American National Museum
- American Museum Novitates
- California African American Museum
- Chinese American Museum
