= Project Exploration =

Science education

- Founded: 1999
- Founder: Gabrielle Lyon, Paul Sereno, co-founders
- Type: Nonprofit educational organization
- Purpose: Science education for students underrepresented in the sciences, primarily girls and minorities
- Location: 4511 S Evans Ave. Chicago, IL 60653
- Region served: Chicago, Illinois, United States
- Method: Mentoring and field science
- Website: www.projectexploration.org

Project Exploration is a not-for-profit educational program whose goal is to "change the face of science" by encouraging interest in science among students—especially girls and minorities—who traditionally have not found effective career routes into scientific disciplines. Its primary method is to create intensive collaborative relationships between students and working field researchers through structured programs involving the University of Chicago and other institutions. In January 2010, it received a Presidential Award for Excellence in Science, Mathematics and Engineering Mentoring. The organization, founded in 1999, is based in Chicago, Illinois, USA.

== Activities ==
Project Exploration currently serves nearly 1,000 students. It began as an after-school and summer program when Gabrielle Lyon, a teacher at Fiske Elementary School on the South Side of Chicago, decided that students underrepresented in the sciences, primarily girls and minorities, should be given opportunities to collaborate with actual scientists and participate in real-life scientific research. Students design research projects and test them in the field, or work summers at museums demonstrating science to young children.

- Sisters4Science

Sisters4Science is a year-round after-school and field program that combines science exploration with leadership development for approximately 100 minority middle school girls. Girls participate in hands-on science activities led by women scientists as well as participate in science-based field trips.

- Girls Health and Science Day

Project Exploration organizes a one-day symposium with workshops on the topics of sexuality and tolerance, healthy relationships, self-worth, the female body, and self-defense for female students across Chicago in grades 7–10.

- All Girls Expedition

The All Girls Expedition is an intensive two-week classroom and field work experience for twenty girls . It includes intensive classroom instruction in geology, biology, evaluation, and field skills followed by one week working in the field alongside scientists. A recent expedition was to Yellowstone National Park in Wyoming, to conduct fieldwork on the water chemistry of geysers, track coyotes and explore a cave with Project Exploration and Yellowstone researchers.

- The Science Teacher Field Institute

The Science Teacher Field Institute is an annual three-week professional development program for Chicago Public School teachers which includes both classroom and field experience with scientists in the disciplines of geology, paleontology, and astronomy. All costs are covered by private donations. This program includes field work at eastern Montana's Lost-in-Time Ranch under supervision of professional paleontologists from the University of Chicago and Project co-founder Gabrielle Lyon.

== Presidential Award ==
The Presidential Award for Excellence in Science, Mathematics and Engineering Mentoring, awarded each year to individuals or organizations, recognizes the crucial role that mentoring plays in the academic and personal development of students studying science or engineering and who belong to minorities that are underrepresented in those fields. By offering their time, encouragement and expertise to these students, mentors help ensure that the next generation of scientists and engineers will better reflect the diversity of the United States. Candidates for the Presidential Mentoring Award are nominated by colleagues, administrators, and students from their home institutions. The mentoring can involve students at any grade level from elementary through graduate school. In addition to being honored at the White House, recipients receive awards of $10,000 to advance their mentoring efforts. "There is no higher calling than furthering the educational advancement of our nation’s young people and encouraging and inspiring our next generation of leaders," President Obama said. "These awards represent a heartfelt salute of appreciation to a remarkable group of individuals who have devoted their lives and careers to helping others and in doing so have helped us all."

The award to Project Exploration was announced in July 2009. The award ceremony took place in January 2010 at The White House.
