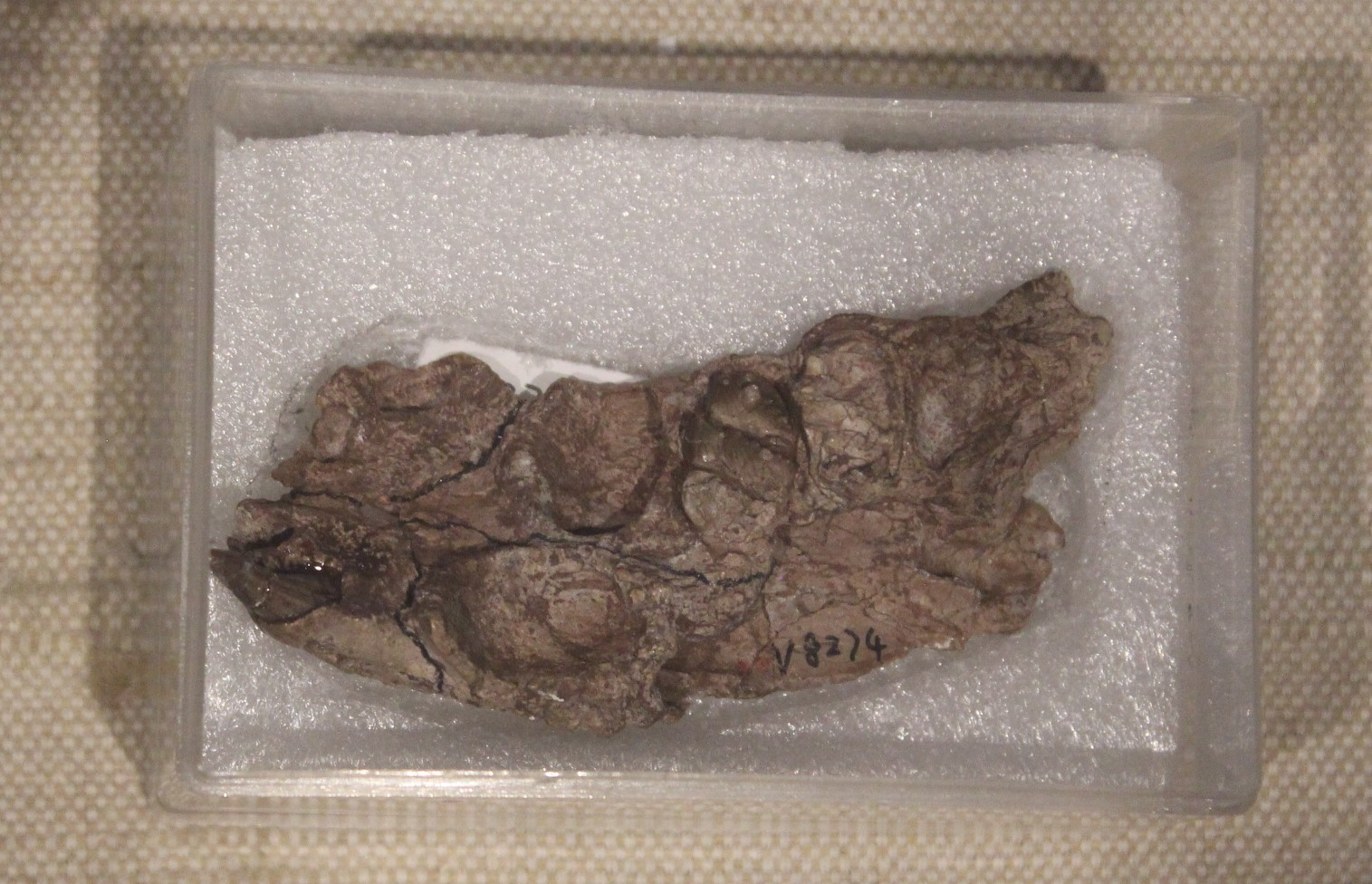
- Ventral view of holotype skull (IVPP V8274), Paleozoological Museum of China

Scientific classification
- Kingdom: Animalia
- Phylum: Chordata
- Class: Reptilia
- Clade: Pseudosuchia
- Clade: Crocodylomorpha
- Clade: †Notosuchia
- Family: †Chimaerasuchidae
- Genus: †Chimaerasuchus; Wu et al., 1995

Type species
- †Chimaerasuchus paradoxus Wu et al., 1995

= Chimaerasuchus =

Chimaerasuchus Temporal range: Early Cretaceous, 120 Ma

Extinct genus of reptiles

Chimaerasuchus ("chimera crocodile") is an extinct genus of Chinese crocodyliform from the Early Cretaceous Wulong Formation. Chimaerasuchus was originally discovered in the 1960s but not identified as a crocodyliform until 1995, instead thought to possibly be a multituberculate mammal. The four teeth in the very tip of its short snout gave it a "bucktoothed" appearance. Due its multicusped teeth and marked heterodonty, it is believed to have been an herbivore: an adaptation which evolved numerous times across Mesozoic crocodyliforms.

== Features ==
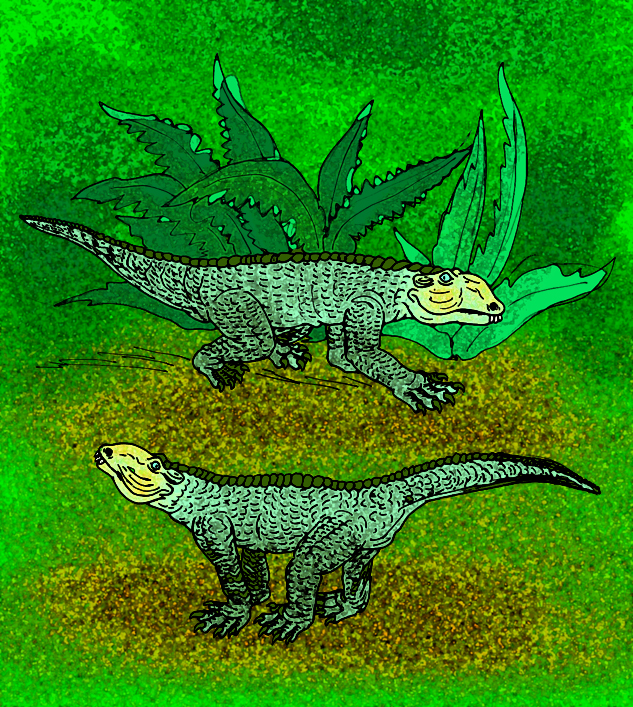
Life reconstruction

=== General features and size ===
Chimaerasuchus is known from one specimen, a partial skeleton. It was not a particularly large animal, estimated to be around 1 metre (3 ft 3 in) long and not very heavily built. The skull would have been short but quite large compared to much of the rest of the body. Its forelimbs were short but had sharp and highly curved claws. The tail, hindlimbs, ribcage and most of the vertebrae remain unknown.

=== Skull and mandible ===
The snout is known from a large fragment stretching from the tip back to just in front of the orbit. Its rostrum is deep and has a blunt end, with a slightly expanded tip. It is thought that the snout reached 65 millimetres (2.6 in) and the entire skull was around 135 millimetres (5.3 in) long, giving Chimaerasuchus a very short jaw and mouth compared with other crocodyliforms. The external nares are very large and come together to almost form one large tunnel at the opening. The antorbital fenestra is very small and has no fossa surrounding it. Much of the bone that forms the snout has small pits and grooves running along it. The premaxilla has a large dorsal portion which frames the external nares and fits between the maxilla and the nasal bone, which has led to the suggestion that there may have been fleshy soft tissues around this area in life. Each premaxilla has two dental alveoli, although only one of the four teeth remains in the skull, and a rough, rugose surface where there are no alveoli. A small gap between the last premaxillary and first maxillary alveolus was probably where a large tooth from the mandible fitted in when the jaws were closed. The maxillae are large, although quite short, and had a very straight suture with the nasal but complex interdigitating sutures with other bones. They underlay the jugal next to the orbit, although this section was not actually preserved. There is little bony palate formed by the maxillae as their dental alveoli are very large, and so there is little space between them. The maxillary teeth are very unusual, as they more closely resemble molars or premolars from a mammal than normal crocodyliform teeth, as they are large and broad, more suited to grinding than slicing. The nasal bones just touch the borders of the nares anteriorly, and just touch the frontal bones posteriorly in a V-shaped suture, as they are very slender and elongated. Very little of the prefrontals, and none of the frontals, is preserved at all. The lacrimals are almost perfectly vertical, and much taller than they are long. A part of the jugal is expanded, forming a shelf projecting almost across the tooth row vertically, perhaps protecting the teeth. The mandibles have no teeth preserved, and only one dental alveolus, right at the posterior end of the dentary bone. It is estimated that the whole mandible was about 135–140 millimetres (5.3–5.5 in) long. A ridge extends along the external side of the mandible, which may have been for the attachment of soft cheek tissue to prevent plant matter escaping while being chewed as in Notosuchus. Little is known about the mandible due to its compression during fossilisation, but the angular had a lateral process just below the facet for attachment which, along with the long articular facet enabling a sliding motion, probably allowed Chimaerasuchus to move its lower jaw back and forth in a chewing motion to grind plant matter. The absence of a posterior buttress on the articular facet indicates that the pterygoideus muscle could have generated horizontal force enabling this chewing to take place. The two roughly conical teeth in each premaxilla would have been used for nipping off plant material or possibly for defence, while the molariform, polycuspid teeth in the maxillae (at least four in each) could have ground up the food. Although the dentary teeth are not known, it is very likely that there was one conical pair at the front which fitted in the gap between premaxilla and maxilla, while the remainder worked with the maxillary teeth to grind, indicating that Chimaerasuchus was almost certainly a herbivore.

=== Spinal column ===
Three cervical and twelve dorsal vertebrae are preserved, although none are in good condition. Those that have reasonably-preserved centra show that these were amphicoelous, The neural spines are low, but the neural canals are quite large in all the cervical vertebrae. The axis vertebra is in poor condition, missing both neural spine and odontoid process, although its zygapophyses are well enough preserved that it's visible that the posterior ones are higher than the anterior ones. There may have been a median crest along the spinal column, but this is uncertain.

=== Osteoderms ===
One osteoderm is preserved, and it is incomplete, but it is partially sculpted and has a small ventral peg. This may be a remnant of a more extensive flange such as in other crocodyliforms. It is unknown how extensive the dermal armour was.

=== Pectoral girdle and forelimbs ===
The scapulae are preserved relatively well in places, although many parts are missing. The blades are broad and flat, and the scapulae have thick anterior edges. The coracoid is constricted in the middle, but has a thick process for attachment to the scapulae and is expanded over the chest into a broad surface. The humeri are estimated to be about 82 millimetres (3.2 in) long and the ulnae to be 76 millimetres (3.0 in) long, giving Chimaerasuchus rather short front legs. Each humerus has a short but highly expanded deltopectoral crest and a slender shaft. There is no olecranon process on the ulnae, and the radii are slender and rod-like with large proximal ends. The radiales and centrales are thick and heavy, and carpals 3 and 4 are fused into one bone. The metacarpals grow longer and thinner from I to IV, but V is slightly shorter and very thin. The phalangeal formula is probably 2, 3, 3, 4, 3 (including the unguals, which are strongly curved and arched).

=== Pelvic girdle and hindlimbs ===
The pelvis is poorly preserved. The ilium has no blade, and the preacetabular process is small and rod-like, with a deep acetabulum. Facets are present which indicate that there were two sacral ribs. The ischium is narrow and elongated, more so than almost any other crocodyliform. Only a fragment of one femur is preserved, and this shows few distinctive characteristics.
