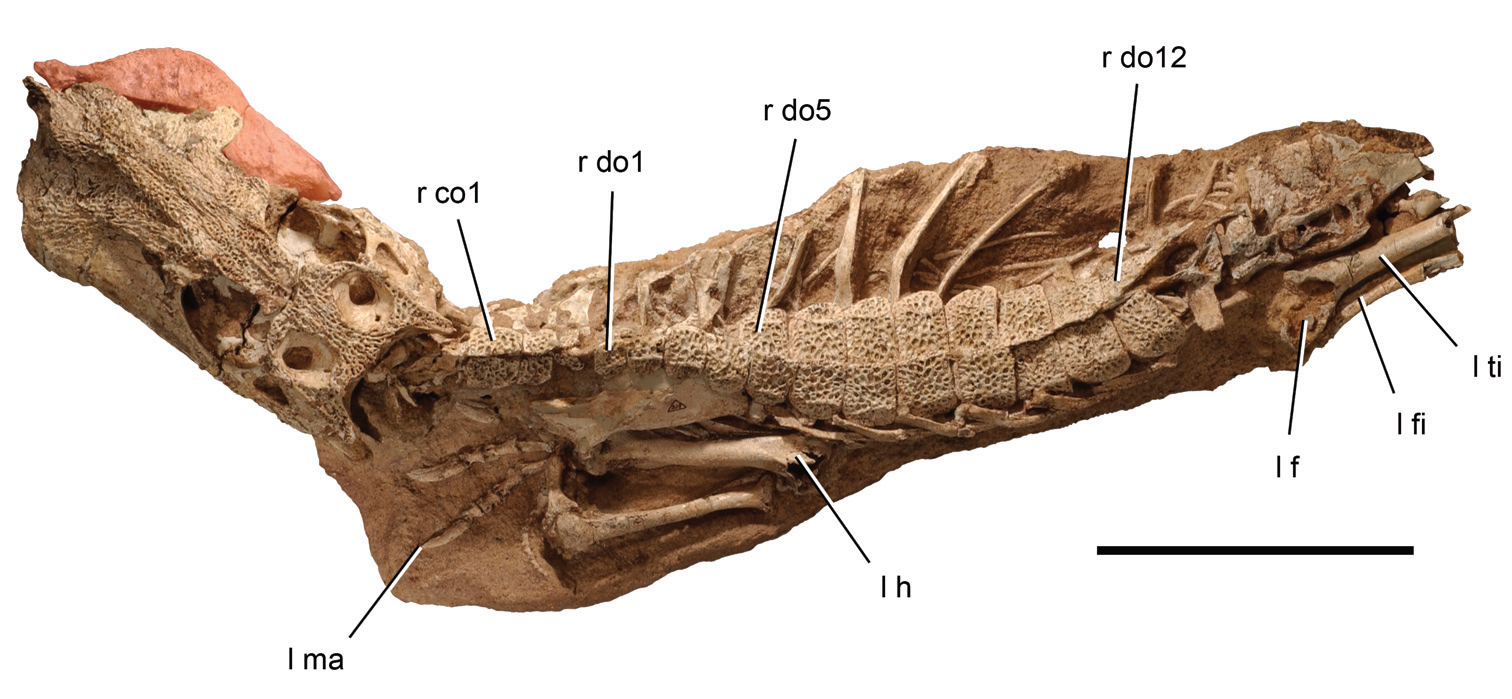
- Skeleton

Scientific classification
- Kingdom: Animalia
- Phylum: Chordata
- Class: Reptilia
- Clade: Archosauria
- Clade: Pseudosuchia
- Clade: Crocodylomorpha
- Clade: †Notosuchia
- Family: †Uruguaysuchidae
- Genus: †Anatosuchus; Sereno et al., 2003

Species
- †A. minor Sereno et al., 2003 (type)

= Anatosuchus =

Anatosuchus Temporal range: Aptian–Albian Early Cretaceous

Extinct genus of reptiles

Anatosuchus ("duck crocodile", the name from the Latin anas ("duck") and the Greek souchos ("crocodile"), for the broad, duck-like snout) is an extinct genus of notosuchian crocodyliforms discovered in Gadoufaoua, Niger, and described by a team of palaeontologists led by the American Paul Sereno in 2003, in the Journal of Vertebrate Paleontology.

== Discovery ==
The type species of Anatosuchus is A. minor, in reference to its small body size. The holotype material (MNN GDF603), is a nearly complete skull with articulated lower jaws, belonging to a juvenile. It was discovered from the upper portion of the Elrhaz Formation and lower portion of Echkar Formation, indicating an Early Cretaceous (Late Aptian or Early Albian) age. Another specimen was found later (MNN GAD17) belonging to an adult, which had both the skull and much of the postcranial skeleton. Differences in the skull indicate that the unusual broad, flattened shape developed as the animal grew older.

== Description ==
=== Skull and jaws ===
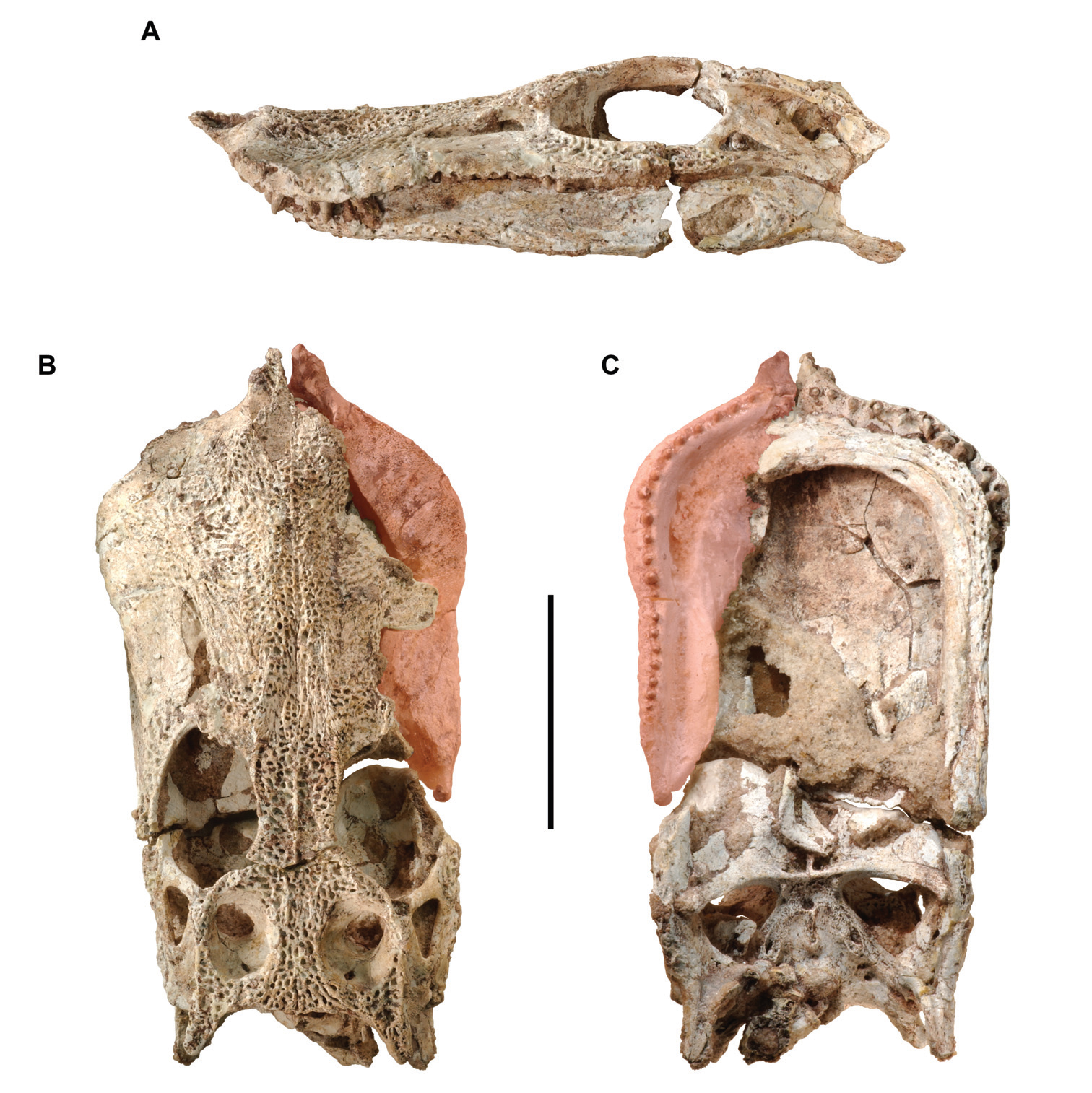
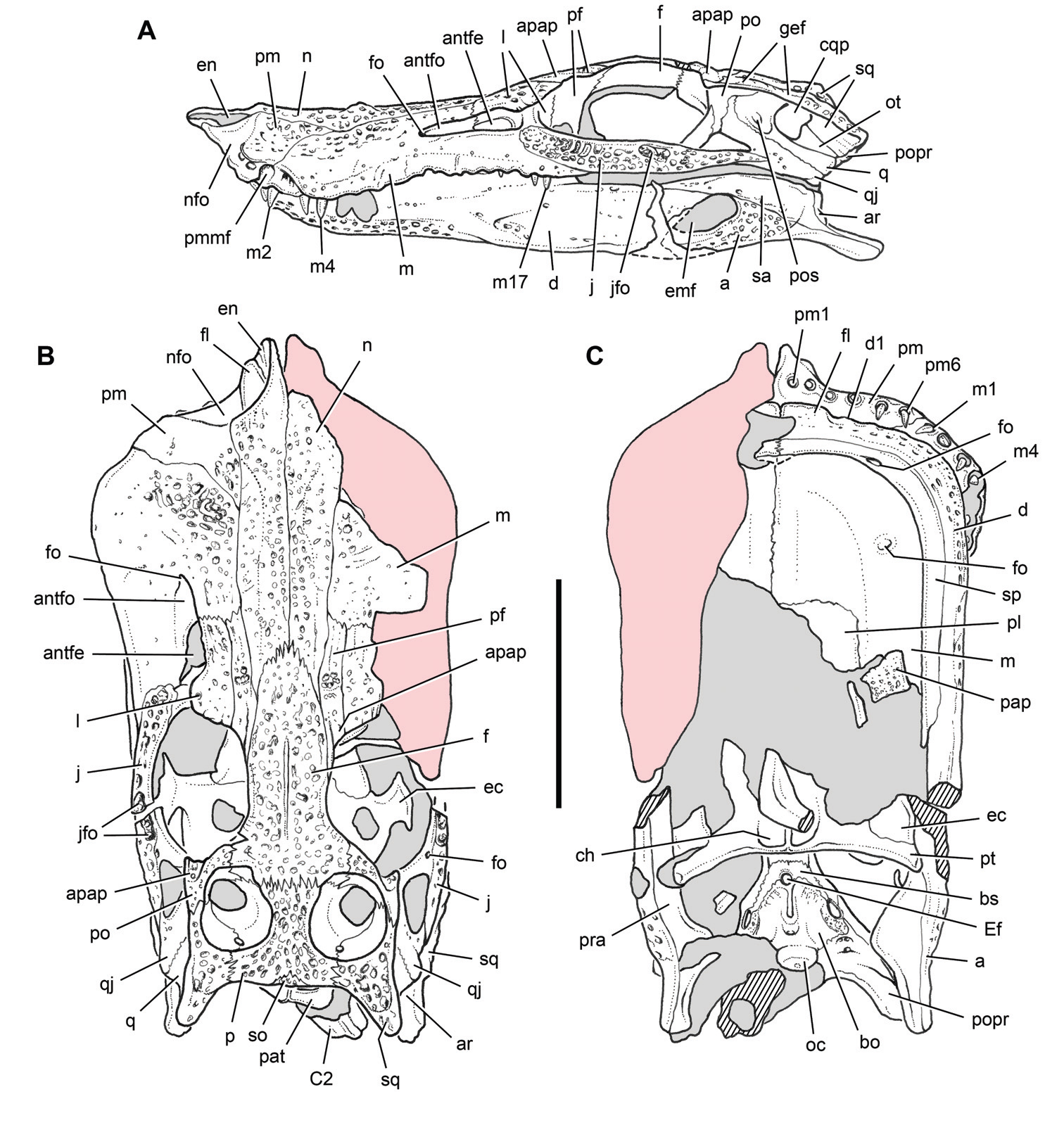
Skull from multiple angles and diagrams

The premaxillae are broad and flat, and form a line straight across the front of Anatosuchus's snout; each holds six recurved teeth which point backwards into the mouth. The internarial processes of the premaxillae taper steeply up towards the projecting nasals; they begin as very wide, meaning that the external nares are dorsoventrally compressed. The premaxillae also form the floor of the narial passages, including a small flange which causes the nares to point up and out somewhat. This gives Anatosuchus a visible projecting nose on the front of its broad snout. The smooth narial fossae are located just behind these, and help to give the snout its broad flattened look.

The maxillae are, by quite a long way, the largest and most expansive bones in the skull; each holds nineteen small recurved teeth. They have a narrow alveolar margin at the edge of their broad expanse, giving the head of Anatosuchus a rather rectangular appearance, and broad rami that extend above and below the antorbital opening. The upper of these rami form a long suture with the nasal, and then meet the prefrontal and lacrimal directly above the antorbital fenestra. The alveolar margin is vertically oriented, but runs anteroposteriorly rather than transversely as that of the premaxilla does. The maxilla is quite highly textured with pits and neurovascular canals, although far less than the nasal, frontal and parietal bones in particular.

The maxillae also form much of the palate, particularly at the anterior section of the palate; the palatine bones form almost all the remainder. The median one-third (measured transversely from left to right) is arched dorsally, making the buccal cavity larger, whereas the two lateral thirds by this measure are horizontal. There is a slit-shaped foramen on each maxilla on the palate. The very posterior section is formed by the pterygoid and ectopterygoid; these also form the projecting posteroventral mandibular rami. The choanae are as far back as possible without contacting the suborbital fenestrae; there is a thin choanal septum between them where they emerge in the pterygoids.

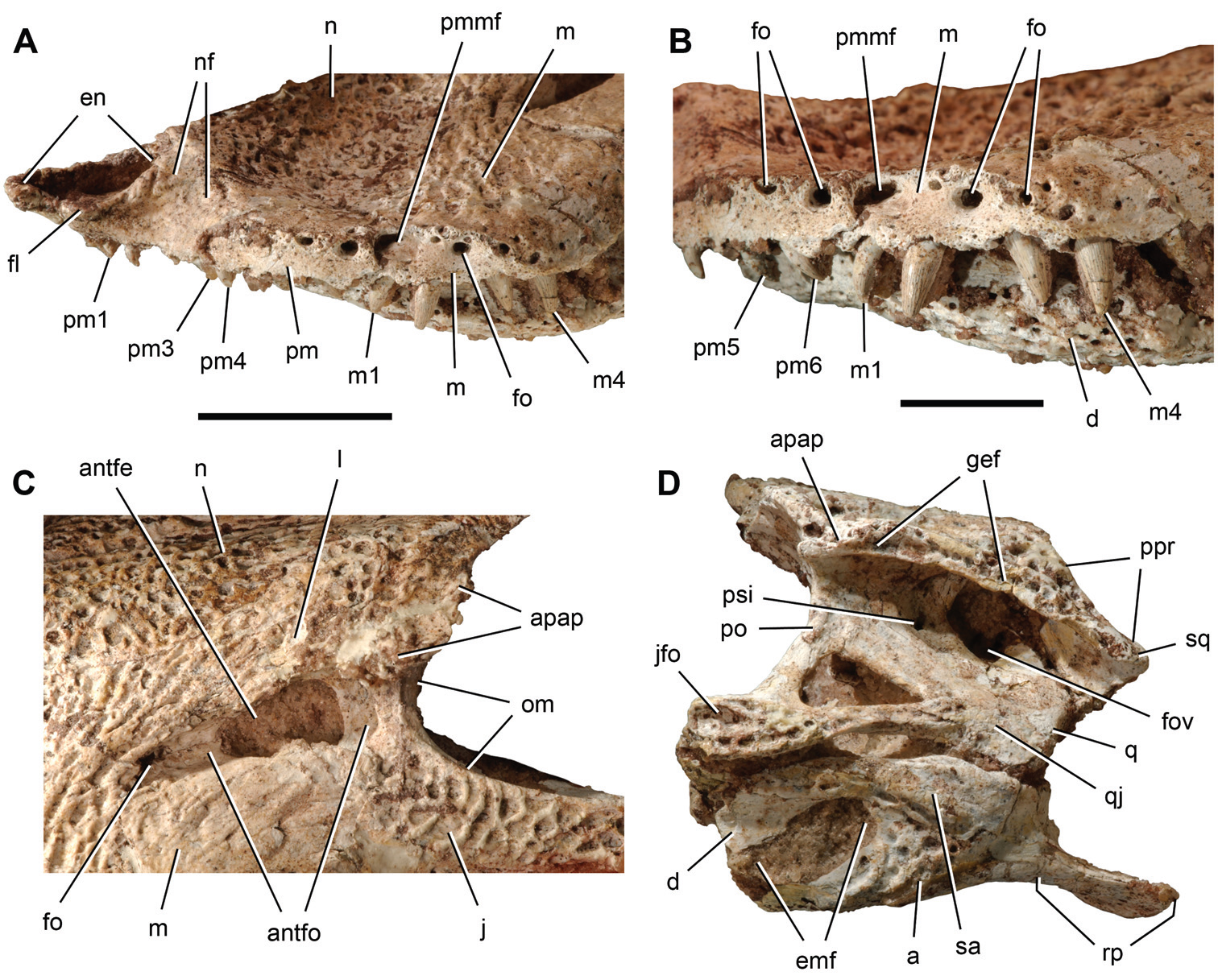
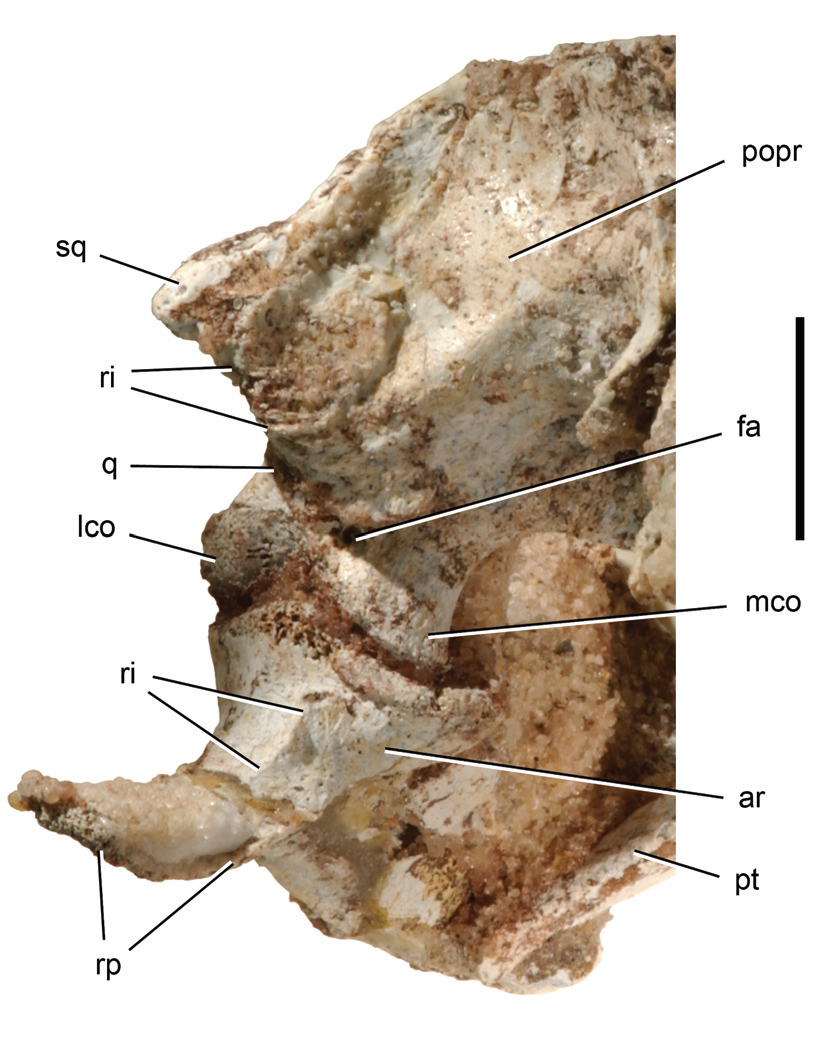
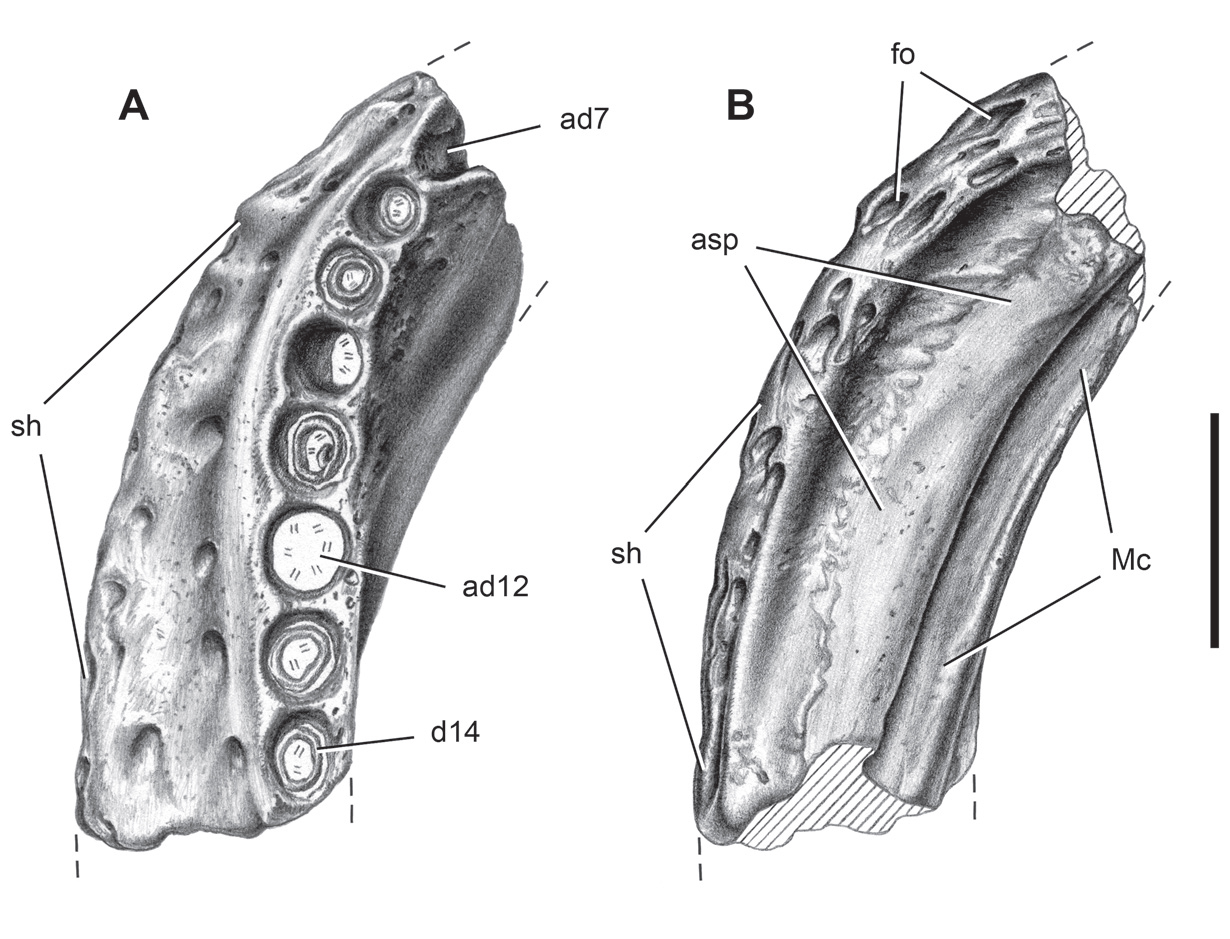
Skull details

The nasal bones are quite long, and sutured together along their whole length; they begin just behind the internarial bar where the premaxillae meet, and end with two processes beneath the frontal bone. The lacrimal bones are L-shaped, with one ramus projecting forwards to meet the maxilla and one ramus projecting downwards to form part of the orbit. The lacrimal also has a small process for articulating with a palpebral, which projects out over the orbit; although the palpebrals are disarticulated, they have fallen into orbits and so can be examined. Both anterior and posterior palpebrals were present above each orbit. The prefrontal bones are shaped rather like a stylised capital I, wider at each of the ends, and effectively separate the nasals and lacrimals.

The frontal bones are fused into one large bone, as are the parietals. The frontal-parietal suture is strong and highly interdigitating; although the frontals bear a medial crest, the parietal skull table is flat save for the deep pits across it. In the juvenile specimen, the interorbital width is less than the width across the skull table (between the two supratemporal fenestrae), but in the adult interorbital width is almost twice skull table width. The supratemporal fenestrae have distinctive corners in them, formed by projections of the frontal bone. This feature seems to have occurred as the animal grew older. The postorbital bones are small and slightly curved; they possess articulations for the posterior palpebral.

The squamosal bones, right at the back and top of the skull, are triradiate, with slender anterior processes that contact the postorbitals and offset posterior processes that dip down to the braincase. The jugals have relatively long anterior rami, but not long enough to contact the antorbital fossae. There is a small oval fossa located beneath each orbit. The quadratojugals are partially fused to the quadrates close to their condyles, but do not form part of any jaw articulation. The quadrates are angled posteroventrally from the otic region to their condyles.

The braincase is quite well preserved. The supraoccipitals are small and triangular, with a short vertical nuchal keel on the occiput; large flanges extend off this to each side. The paraoccipital processes, which contact both the squamosals and the quadrate condyles, are marked with a series of striations. The occipital condyles are ventrally deflected and are formed almost entirely by the basioccipitals. Each side of the skull has three Eustachian foramina present - two on each basioccipital, one anterior and one posterior, and one between basisphenoid and otoccipital in the basal tuber. A pair of crests runs between the quadrate and the pterygoid on each lateral side of the braincase.

The lower jaw is U-shaped, to match the upper jaw; the dentary bears twenty-one teeth on each side. The dentary becomes broader transversely than dorsoventrally as it turns the corners of the U-shape, due to wide and vascularised dentary shelves and alveolar margins. The two dentary bones are interdigitating at their symphysis, meaning that the lower jaw is entirely inflexible. The dentary projects somewhat posteriorly, forming the edge of the external mandibular fenestra. Both angular and surangular extend to the top of the coronoid process, and the surangular forms much of the jaw articulation. The articular has a glenoid for the quadrate condyles; it is saddle-shaped, with no anterior or posterior lip, although there is a prominent attachment crest posteroventral to the jaw joint.

The teeth have subconical crowns that curve in towards the centre of the mouth; all are fairly small and not very worn, indicating relatively little use. Most of the teeth have small carinae present on their surfaces. The dentary symphysis has no teeth present to either side of it for 11 millimetres (0.43 in), but forms a sharpish edge which may have been used with the premaxillary teeth 1-3 for cutting into prey. The largest teeth are found at the corners of the skull.

=== Postcranial skeleton and osteoderms ===
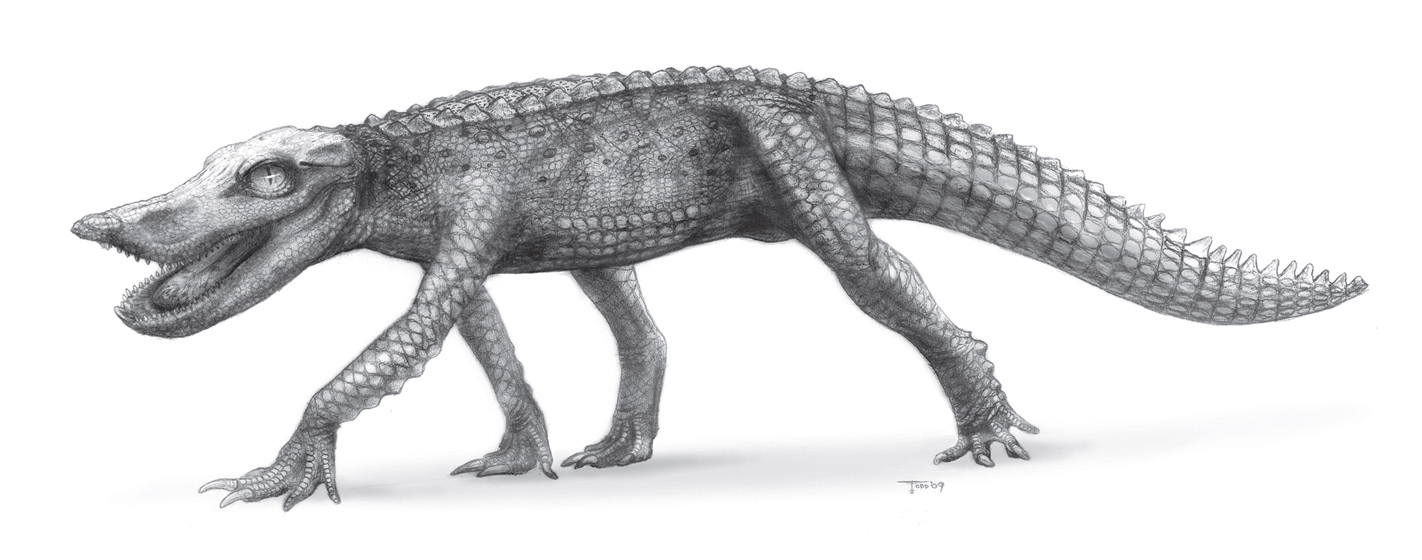
Life restoration

Anatosuchus has a proatlas vertebra, eight cervical vertebrae and probably 16 dorsal vertebrae, though only 15 are preserved. There are also two sacral vertebrae. The dorsal vertebrae are amphicoelous, while the cervical centra lack hypapophyses. The proatlas is an inverted V-shaped piece of bone with a dorsal keel and is quite large relative to the atlas, which is made up of two separate neural arches. The axis has a low, subrectangular neural spine; neural spines grow taller along the cervical vertebrae, with that of the third cervical vertebra being twice as tall as long and that of the seventh being almost five times as tall as long. The dorsal vertebrae are relatively long compared to their width, with length always more than half the width across the transverse processes.

The ribs of the atlas and axis vertebrae are straight, whereas those of the other cervical vertebrae are short and triradiate. Dorsal ribs bend ventrally after they clear the osteoderm shield, forming a slight flange along the anterior margin; the ones closer to the posterior end have only one head. The gastralia are quite poorly preserved between the girdles.

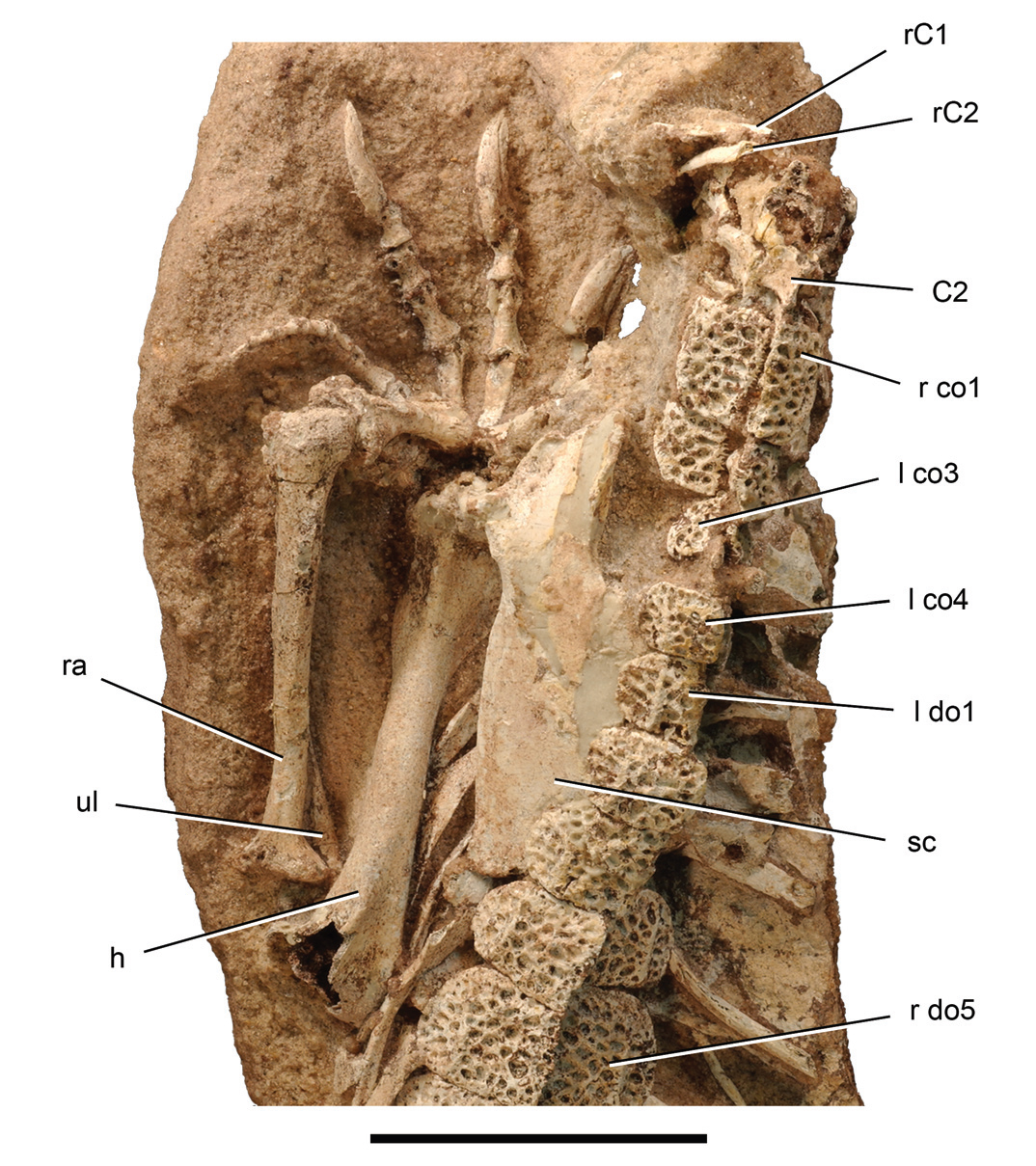
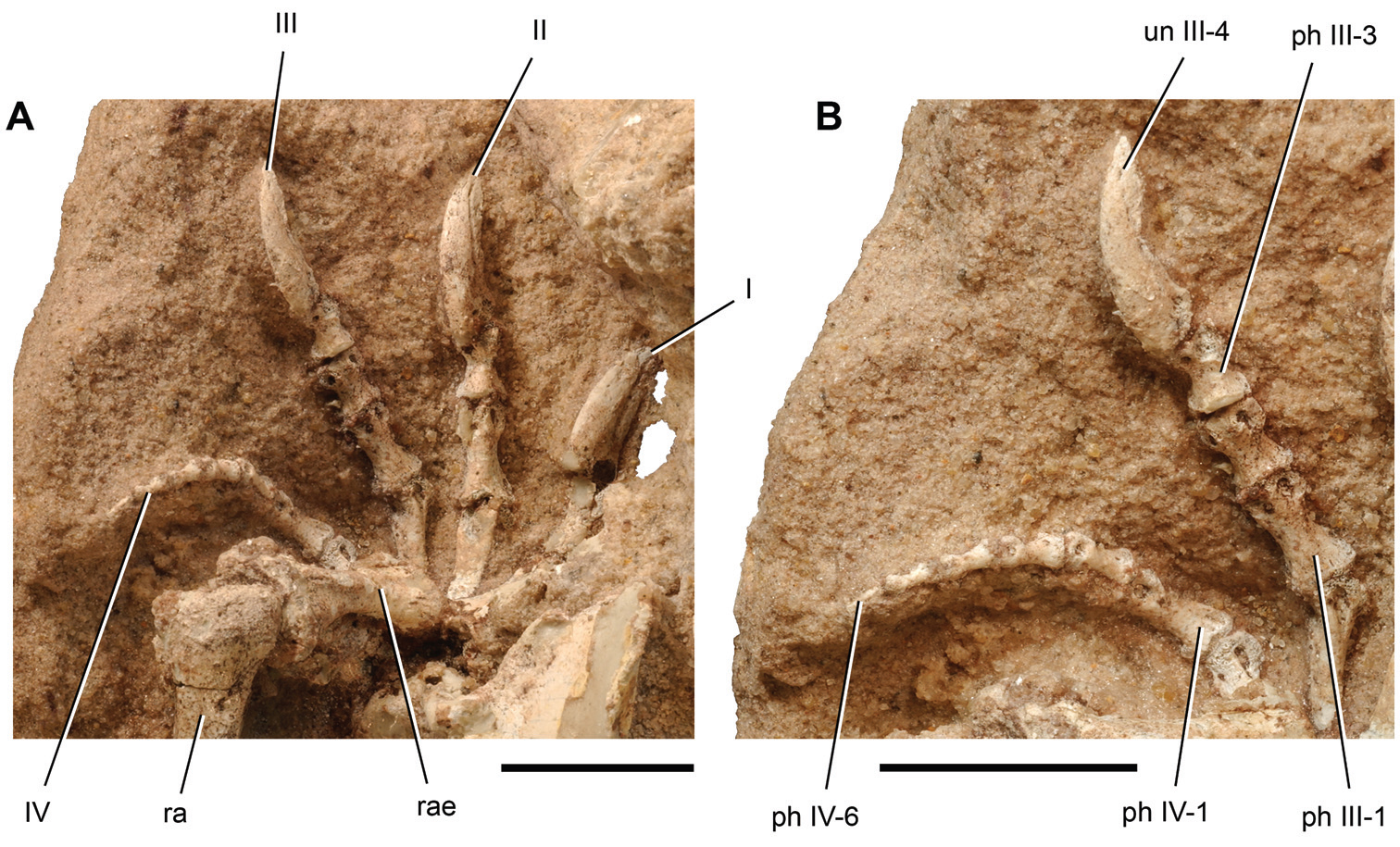
Pectoral girdle and forelimb

Osteoderms appear only to have been present on the dorsal surface; they were in pairs sutured together, each pair corresponding to one dorsal vertebra or up to three cervical ones. The articulation between rows is minimal, limited to a slight overlap between rows next to each other. The osteoderms are trapezoidal in shape and quite pitted; they articulate via a facet in the centre of the suture with their corresponding vertebra, the top of the neural spine of which fits into the facet.

The scapulae are quite broad, but do not flare very widely at the distal end of the blade, which is tucked under the osteoderms. The coracoids are highly elongated. The humeri are long and have straight shafts; they are quite slender, with the width less than 10% of the length. The fossae on them where the olecranon processes would fit are strongly developed, suggesting that the legs could be held quite straight. The radii have strongly flared proximal ends, and are noticeably shorter than the ulnae since these extend along the edges of the radiales. The ulnae are relatively curved. The radiales are strong, heavy bones, almost as wide as the radii, while the ulnares are poorly preserved. The manus are very large, and have strange fourth digits; each one has six phalanges, rather than the normal four, although the total length is still only around 80% of that of the other digits. This is mainly due to their elongated unguals. which have a narrow attachment groove along their length and are quite strongly arched. It is not known what benefit these specialised features conferred.

== Classification ==
In the initial description of Anatosuchus, it formed a clade with Comahuesuchus, within a less inclusive Notosuchia, also found to be monophyletic. However, further work proposed that Anatosuchus is not closely related to Comahuesuchus, but instead is a member of Uruguaysuchidae.

== Palaeobiology ==
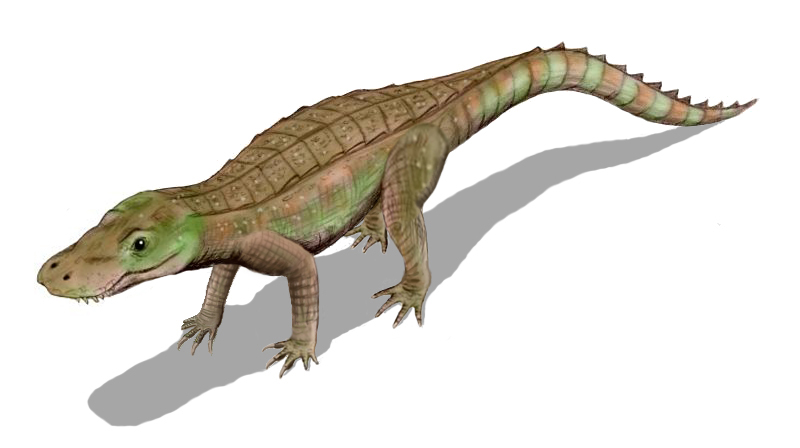
Restoration

As the specific name indicates, A. minor was a very small crocodylomorph, with an adult body length estimated at around 70 centimetres (28 in). It had a very broad, duck-like snout. Despite its appearance it is considered to have a diet of small, aquatic creatures.
