= Sables du Castrais Formation =

Geologic formation in France

- Stratigraphic range: Eocene, Ypresian–Bartonian
- Type: Geological formation
- Sub-units: Lophiodon lautricense and Palaeotherium zone; Issel Member; Villeneuve-la-Comptal Member; Grès de Carcassonne Member; Argiles rutilants d'Issel et de Saint-Papoul; Grès d'Issel; Molasses de Castelnaudary; Issel Sandstones
- Underlies: Molasses de Saix et de Lautrec Formation
- Overlies: Danian rocks
- Thickness: 15–40 metres (49–131 ft) at the base and at Castelnaudary. 50–100 metres (160–330 ft) at Issel.

Lithology
- Primary: Sandstone, molasse and conglomerate
- Other: Gravel clays

Location
- Coordinates: 43°22′05″N 1°59′26″E
- Region: Montagne-Noire
- Country: France
- Extent: Carcassonne, Castelnaudary, Issel, Réalmont and Saint-Papoul

Type section
- Named by: M. Richard (1946)
- Sables du Castrais Formation (France)

The Sables du Castrais Formation, also known as the Molasses du Castrais, is a geologic formation of Eocene (Ypresian to Bartonian) age, outcropping in the Montagne-Noire region of France.

== History ==
"Petrified fossil remains" were known from the Sables du Castrais Formation since at least the 18th century, and several of these fossils were described by Cuvier (1804) and Cuvier (1822) as belonging to Palaeotherium and Lophiodon.

In 1845, a jaw assigned to Lophiodon lautricensis was discovered in the formation and was described by Noulet (1851); Noulet also mentioned that he had himself collected fossils from the formation alongside pharmacist J. Parayre as early as c. 1843.

Léonce Roux du Carla discovered several more fossils from the Grès d'Issel Member of the Sables du Castrais formation from February 1855 until his death in 1859, and this helped Noulet (1858) to confirm the Eocene age of the deposit. Despite this, all that remains today of du Carla's collection is a single jaw of Palaeotherium castrense from the Sables du Castrais Formation.

Between 1850 and 1868, during the construction of the Castres - Albi railroad, several more fossils were recovered from the Sables du Castrais Formation, including M. Zebrowsky's 1868 discovery of fossils within the area.

The Grès d'Issel Member was identified by Henri de Sévérac in 1873, and the Sables du Castrais Formation was first described by M. Richard in 1946.

The Grès d'Issel Member is located in a quarry which closed around 1966 and is now inaccessible due to it currently being located underneath a private garden.

== Age of the formation ==
The age of the Sables du Castrais Formation was listed as Eocene by Noulet (1858) and in 1867, Gervais noted that the Issel Member likely dated to the Early Eocene, while the Villeneuve-la-Comptal Member likely dated to the Middle Eocene. The formation as a whole falls within the unit MP16 of the Mammal Paleogene zones stratigraphic range.

Caraven-Cachin (1898) was the first to assign the Sables du Castrais Formation to the Bartonian. Stehlin (1910) and Escarguel (1999) dated the formation to the Lutetian-Bartonian and found it to overlie the Molasses de Saix et de Lautrec Formation. Fauré (2011) agreed with the more recent dating of the formation to the Ypresian-Bartonian.

== Geology ==
The base of the Sables du Castrais Formation, which overlies Danian rocks, is made up of Ypresian gravel clays and the Issel Sandstones, which range from 15–40 metres (49–131 ft), and the Argiles rutilants d'Issel et de Saint-Papoul Member is deposited within the gravel clays, and is between 20–30 metres (66–98 ft) thick.

The Argiles rutilants d'Issel et de Saint-Papoul Member is overlain by the Lutetian Grès d'Issel Member, which is between 50–100 metres (160–330 ft) thick, and is overlain by the Bartonian Molasses du Castelnaudary Member. The whole formation underlies the Molasses de Saix et de Lautrec Formation.

The Grès de Carcassonne Member also appears to be slightly younger than the Grès d'Issel Member, likely dating to the late Lutetian or early Bartonian.

The Sables du Castrais Formation was described by Capera and Baillet (2014) as a typical fluviatile formation, with lenticular channels, formed by conglomerates and sandstones, with calcareous cement and large trough cross-strata.

== Paleofauna ==
Color key: Taxon / Reclassified taxon / Taxon falsely reported as present / Dubious taxon or junior synonym / Ichnotaxon / Ootaxon / Morphotaxon	Notes; Uncertain or tentative taxa are in small text; ~~crossed out~~ taxa are discredited.

=== Mammals ===
Artiodactyl

Taxa	Species	Locality	Stratigraphic position	Material	Notes	Images
Catadontherium	C ? paquieri					
Cebochoerus	C.(Gervachoerus) campichii					
Cebochoerus	C.(Cebochoerus) helveticus					
Choeropotamus	C. lautricensis					
Dacrytherium	D. elegans					
Pseudoamphimeryx	P. sp.					
Robiacina	R. minuta					
Tapirulus	Tapirulus cf. schlosseri					
Xiphodon	X. castrense					

Lipotyphia

Taxa	Species	Locality	Stratigraphic position	Material	Notes	Images
Saturninia	S. sp.					

Marsupial

Taxa	Species	Locality	Stratigraphic position	Material	Notes	Images
Paratherium	P. sp.					

Pan-Carnivora

Taxa	Species	Locality	Stratigraphic position	Material	Notes	Images
Hyaenodon	H. nouleti					
Hyaenodon	H. sp					
Kerberos	K. langebadreae	Montespieu	MP16	A partial skull with lower jaws, a fibula, and several lower limb bones		
Quercygale	Q. angustidens					

Perissodactyl

Taxa	Species	Locality	Stratigraphic position	Material	Notes	Images
Anchylophus	A. cf. desmaresti					
Anchylophus	A. cf. gaudini					
Eurohippus	E. parvulus					
Lophiodon	L. isselense.					
Lophiodon	L. lautricense.					
Lophiodon	L. sp.					
Plagiolophus	P. cartailhaci					
Plagiolophus	P. cf. minor					
Leptolophus	L. nouleti					
Lophiaspis	L. occitanicus					
Paralophiodon	P. isselense					
Palaeotherium	P. castrense					
Palaeotherium	P. (Frantzenitherium) lautricense					
Palaeotherium	P. isselanum					
Palaeotherium	P. rhinocerodes					
Palaeotherium	P. siderolithicum					
Palaeotherium	P. pomeli					
Propalaeotherium	P. sp.					

Primates

Taxa	Species	Locality	Stratigraphic position	Material	Notes	Images
Adapis	A. aff. parisiensis					
Adapis	A. rouxii					
Necrolemur	N. sp.					

Rodent

Taxa	Species	Locality	Stratigraphic position	Material	Notes	Images
Gliravus	G. sp.					
Suevoscurius	S. sp.					
Pseudoltinomys	P. sp.					

=== Reptiles ===
Crocodilians

Taxa	Species	Locality	Stratigraphic position	Material	Notes	Images
Asiatosuchus	A. depressifrons					
Atacisaurus	A. glareae					
Atacisaurus	A. cf. sp.					
Crocodylus	C. rouxii					
Dentaneosuchus	D. crassiproratus			A mandibular symphysis.	A giant sebecid crocodile.	
Iberosuchus	I. cf. macrodon					
Kentisuchus	K. astrei					
Pristichampsus	P. rollinati					

Turtles

Taxa	Species	Locality	Stratigraphic position	Material	Notes	Images
Allaeochelys	A. pareyrei					
Allaeochelys	A. nouleti					
Allaeochelys	A. castrensis					
Hadrianus	H. castrensis					
Neochelys	N. mengauti					
Neochelys	N. sp.					
Trionyx	T. filholi					
Trionyx	T. sp.					
