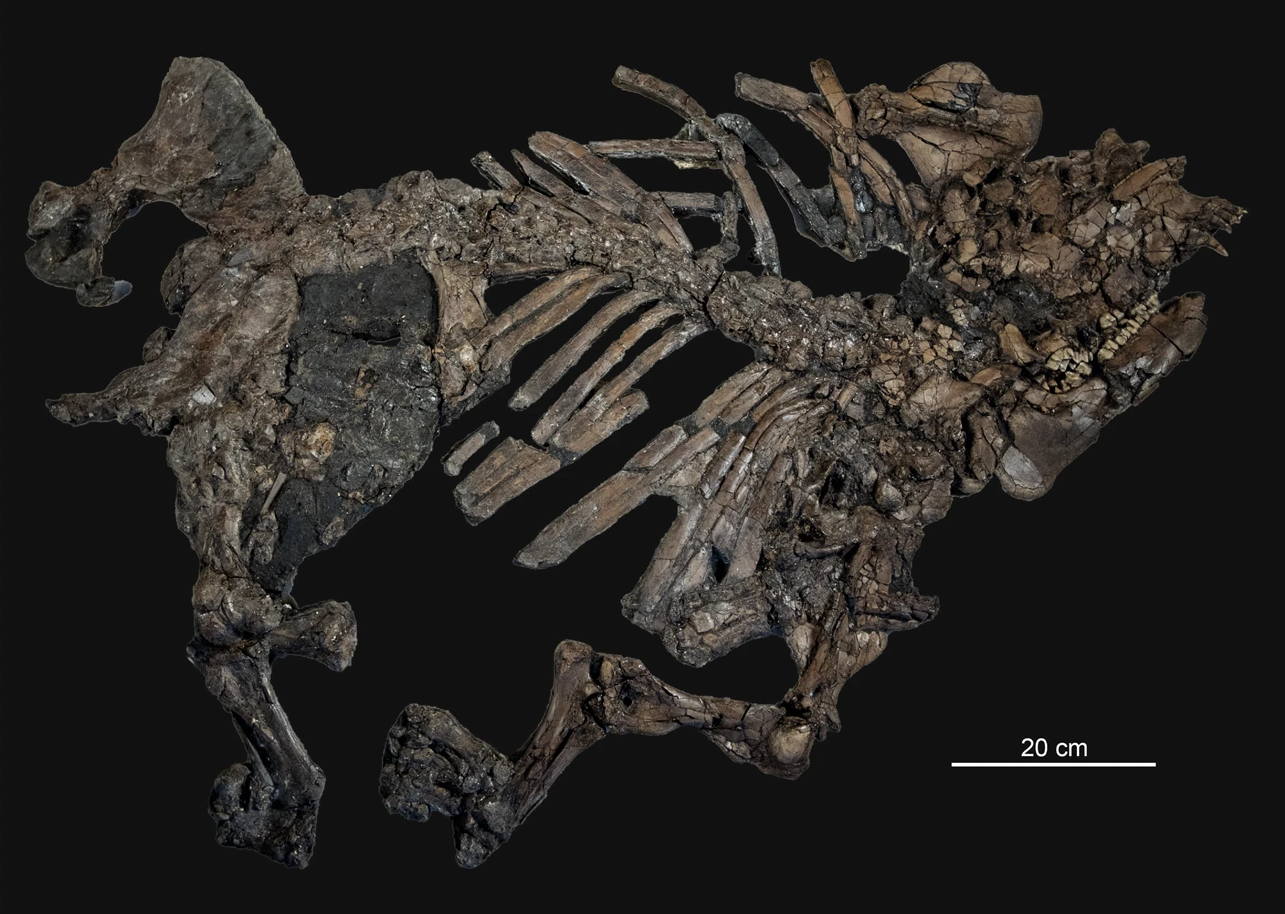
- Lophiodon remensis skeleton from Geiseltal
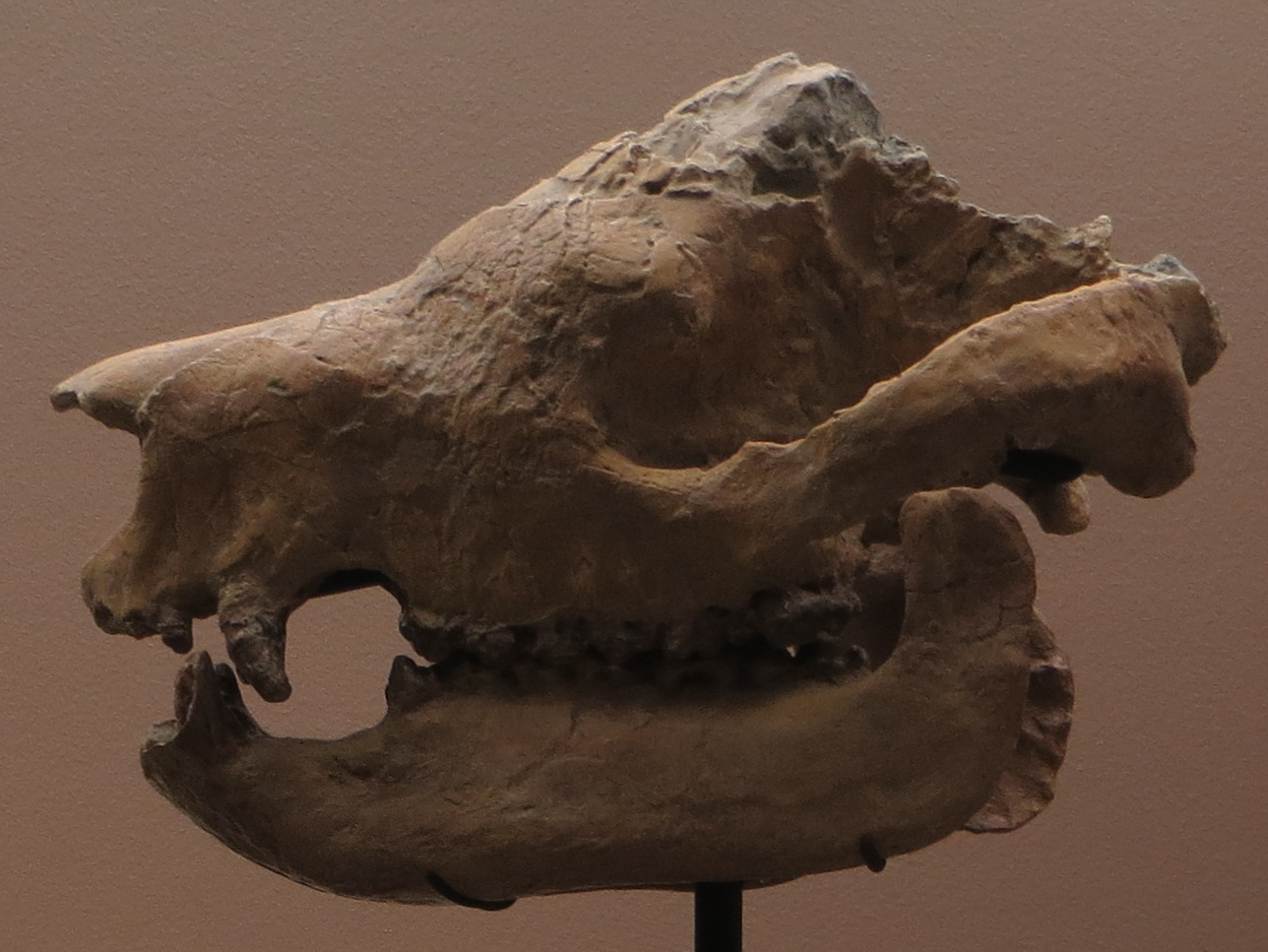
- Skull of Lophiodon leptorhynchum, Natural History Museum of Basel

Scientific classification
- Kingdom: Animalia
- Phylum: Chordata
- Class: Mammalia
- Order: Perissodactyla
- Family: †Lophiodontidae
- Genus: †Lophiodon; Cuvier, 1822

Type species
- †Palaeotherium tapiroïdes (= †Lophiodon tapiroides) Cuvier, 1812

Other species
- †L. tapirotherium Desmarest, 1822; †L. medium Fischer, 1829; †L. parisiense Gervais, 1848–1852; †L. lautricense Noulet, 1851; †L. rhinocerodes Ruetimeyer, 1862; †L. cuvieri Watelet, 1864; †L. remensis Lemoine, 1878; †L. leptorhynchum Filhol, 1888; †L. thomasi Depéret, 1906; †L. glandicus? Astre, 1960; †L. sanmoralense Cuesta, 1994; †L. baroensis Checa, 1997; †L. corsaensis Checa, 1997; †L. eygalayense Labarrere & Montenat, 2011; Species pending reassessment: †L. sardus Bosco, 1902

Synonyms
- Genus synonymy: Tapirotherium Blainville, 1817; Pernatherium Gervais, 1876; Cesserasictis Filhol, 1888; Synonyms of L. tapiroides: Palaeotherium tapiroïdes Cuvier, 1812; Lophiodon molassicus Jäger, 1837; Synonyms of L. tapirotherium: Tapirotherium sp. Blainville, 1817; Lophiodon Munieri Filhol, 1888; Lophiodon parvum Schertz, 1938; Synonyms of L. lautricense: Lophiodon commune var. Franconica Wagner, 1861; Lophiodon douteux Pictet, 1865; Synonyms of L. rhinocerodes: Lophiodon sezannense Filhol, 1888; Synonyms of L. cuvieri: Lophiodon germanicum Schertz, 1938; Synonyms of L. remensis: Lophiodon larteti Filhol, 1888; Synonyms of L. leptorhynchum: Cesserasictis antiquus Filhol, 1888; Synonyms of L. eygalayense: Lophiodon isselense var. minor Montenat, 1964; Dubious species: Lophiodon sibiricus von Waldheim, 1829; Lophiodon monspessulanum von Meyer, 1832; Lophiodon muliere-dentatus Boubée, 1833; Lophiodon arvense Blainville, 1839–1864; Pernatherium rugosum Gervais, 1876

= Lophiodon =

Lophiodon Temporal range: Early to Middle Eocene 50.8–37.8 Ma

Extinct genus of European perissodactyl

Lophiodon is an extinct genus of perissodactyls and the type genus of the Lophiodontidae, one of two major clades of the extinct suborder Ancylopoda. It, like the rest of the family, was endemic to western Europe and lived from the Early to Middle Eocene. Fossils of Lophiodon were first studied in 1804 when the French palaeontologist Georges Cuvier thought that they belonged to tapirs. After initially classifying the formally recognized species to Palaeotherium in 1812, Cuvier named the genus in 1822 based on the hill-like cusps on its molars. Many fossil species were named and assigned to Lophiodon throughout the 19th century but were reassigned to various other mammals including other members of the Lophiodontidae. There are fifteen species currently assigned to Lophiodon, one of questionable taxonomic status and one other pending a possible reassignment to another genus.

The skull of Lophiodon differed from Eocene perissodactyls of other families based on a consistently narrow rostrum and a tall and domed braincase but otherwise shared a lot of morphological traits with them. Lophiodon is noted for the losses of its first upper and lower premolars, strong canines, lengthy postcanine diastemata (gaps between teeth), and gradual molarization (or increased molar-like forms) of the premolars among other various specific dental traits (the latter of which is an evolutionary trend likely in response to changes in vegetation and faunal competition). Lophiodon has bilophodont dentition, meaning that its cheek teeth (mainly the molars) has two transverse ridges for folivory (leaf-eating diets). Postcranial fossil evidence of Lophiodon suggests that it was robust but non-cursorial like extant rhinoceroses and hippopotamuses, using its muscular forelimbs to support its heavy body. Lophiodon had four toes on its forelimbs and three toes on its hindlimbs, a primitive anatomical trait among perissodactyls like earlier species of palaeotheres and extant tapirs. The postcranial morphology of Lophiodon may have been shaped by how dry and terrestrial the environment around it was, and at least some may have possibly had semi-aquatic behaviours.

Lophiodon, relative to its family, ranged from medium to large in size and were usually the largest animals during the Middle Eocene of western Europe. Its various species had a massive range in body mass, from about 62 kg (137 lb) minimum for the basal L. baroensis and L. corsaensis to more than 2,000 kg (4,400 lb) in the cases of the later species L. rhinocerodes and L. lautricense. The large range in body mass of the various Lophiodon species is a reflection of an evolutionary trend in which the genus gradually grew larger in response to major climatic and ecological shifts, with L. lautricense being one of the latest species and arguably the largest species of its family with no size competition in the landmass it lived in.

Multiple species of Lophiodon appeared as early as the late Early Eocene, when western Europe had largely been separated from the North American and eastern Eurasian landmasses as an archipelago. Lophiodon represented an endemic group of perissodactyls unlike the contemporaneous palaeotheres and hyrachyids, although they and other mammals present in the archipelago were shaped by large degrees of endemism as well. Lophiodon species generally lived in hot and forested environments, with humidity and seasonality varying to some extent. Lophiodon, despite having initially existed with other lophiodont genera, eventually became the last representative of its family and became extinct by the end of the Middle Eocene. While the specific causes of its extinction are unclear, it was part of a major faunal turnover that also drove European hyrachyids and sebecian crocodylomorphs to extinction. The extinction causes of Lophiodon may have been due to environmental shifts from climate change and increased competition from the diversifying palaeotheres.

== Taxonomy ==
=== Research history ===
==== Cuvier's documentations and early 19th century taxonomy ====
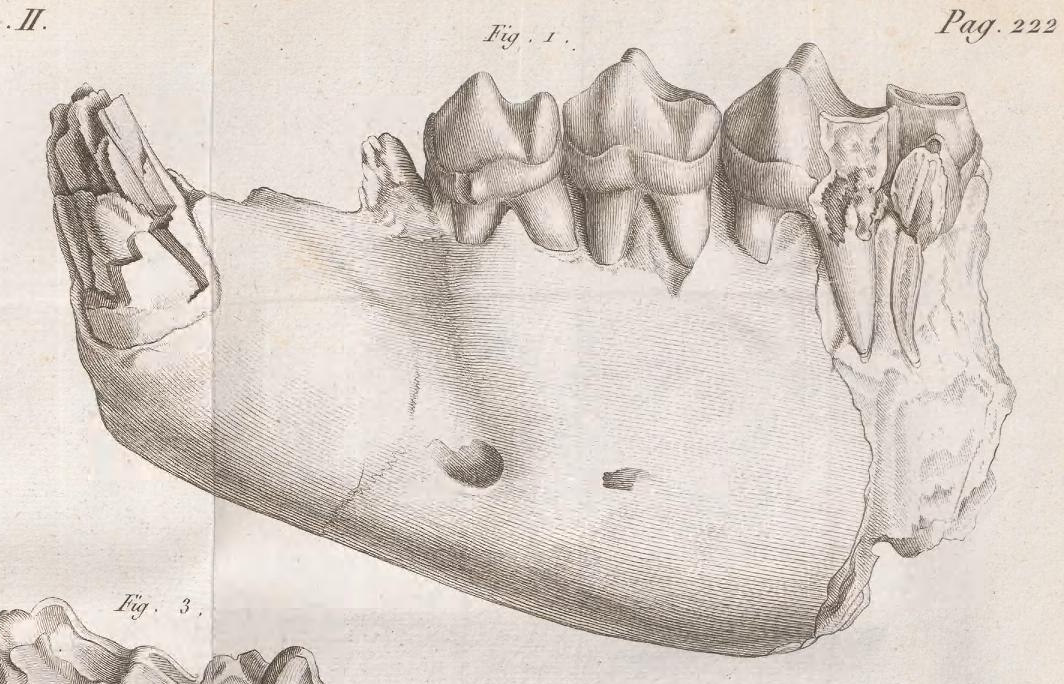
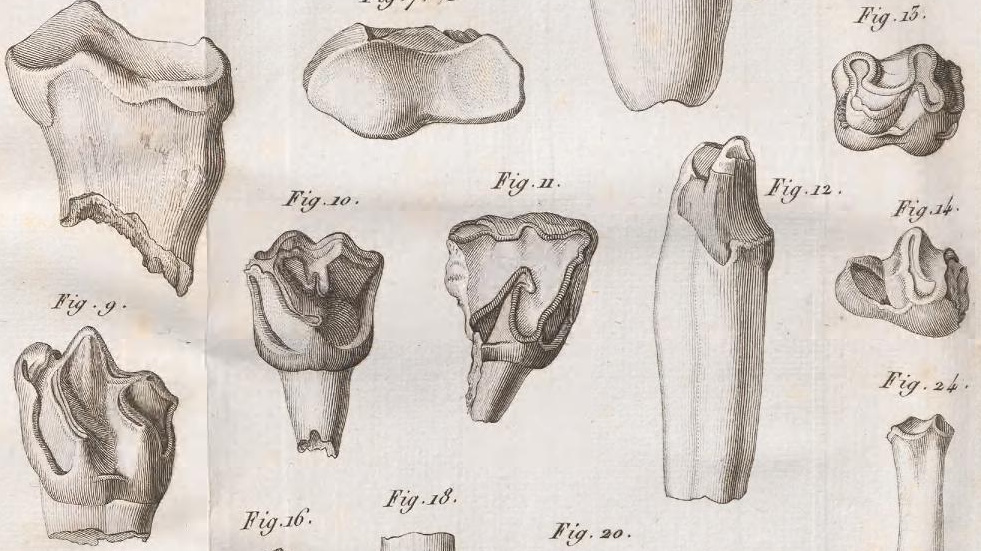
1822 illustrations of the lower jaw of Lophiodon tapiroides from Bouxwiller (left) and teeth of Lophiodon medium from Argenton-sur-Creuse (right)

Fossils of Lophiodon have first been studied in 1804 by the French palaeontologist Georges Cuvier, who originally referred to some of them as belonging to a small-sized tapir (with some close relatives also being studied by him before 1822). In 1812, he erected within the extinct genus Palaeotherium the species P. giganteum, P. tapiroïdes, P. buxovillanum, and P. occitanicum, describing them as being the size of rhinoceroses, oxes, pigs, and sheep, respectively. As early as 1817, French zoologist Henri Marie Ducrotay de Blainville suggested that some species classified to Palaeotherium by Cuvier like P. tapiroïdes should be classified under the new genus Tapirotherium. He suggested that it would have been intermediate in morphology between Tapirus and Palaeotherium. He said that he did not know of any upper jaw belonging to Tapirotherium but suggested that it would be similar to that of Palaeotherium. He noted a lower half of a jaw from a collection belonging to an individual named Mr. de Drée, which he said contained three incisors, a strong canine, and six molars, the last three of the latter of which he said were similar to those of tapirs and Palaeotherium.

In 1822, Cuvier dedicated an entire chapter to "tapir-like" mammal fossils found in various European localities. In the chapter's first section, he described various tapir-like teeth from several localities that he did not assign any name to and referenced several other localities that he would then describe in the next section. Among them were dental material from the French city of Orléans that he assigned to the informal name "tapir gigantesques", or "gigantic tapirs." In the second section, Cuvier erected the genus name Lophiodon, stating that its name references the transverse hill-like cusps of the molars like in modern tapirs. He also stated that like tapirs, Lophiodon had six incisors and two canines on each side of its mouth (or three incisors and one canine in each jaw's side). Cuvier argued that it differed from tapirs in having more oblique cusps in each molar, there being one rather than two cusps in each of the first molars, and the bases of the molars being less rectangular (especially the last ones). Furthermore, he said that some species of Lophiodon had different tooth morphologies more reminiscent of hyraxes and rhinoceroses and thus form a diverse range of forms by species like Palaeotherium. The genus name Lophiodon means "crested tooth", which is a compound of the Greek prefix λόφος ('lóphos') meaning 'crest' and the suffix ὀδούς ('odoús') meaning 'tooth'.

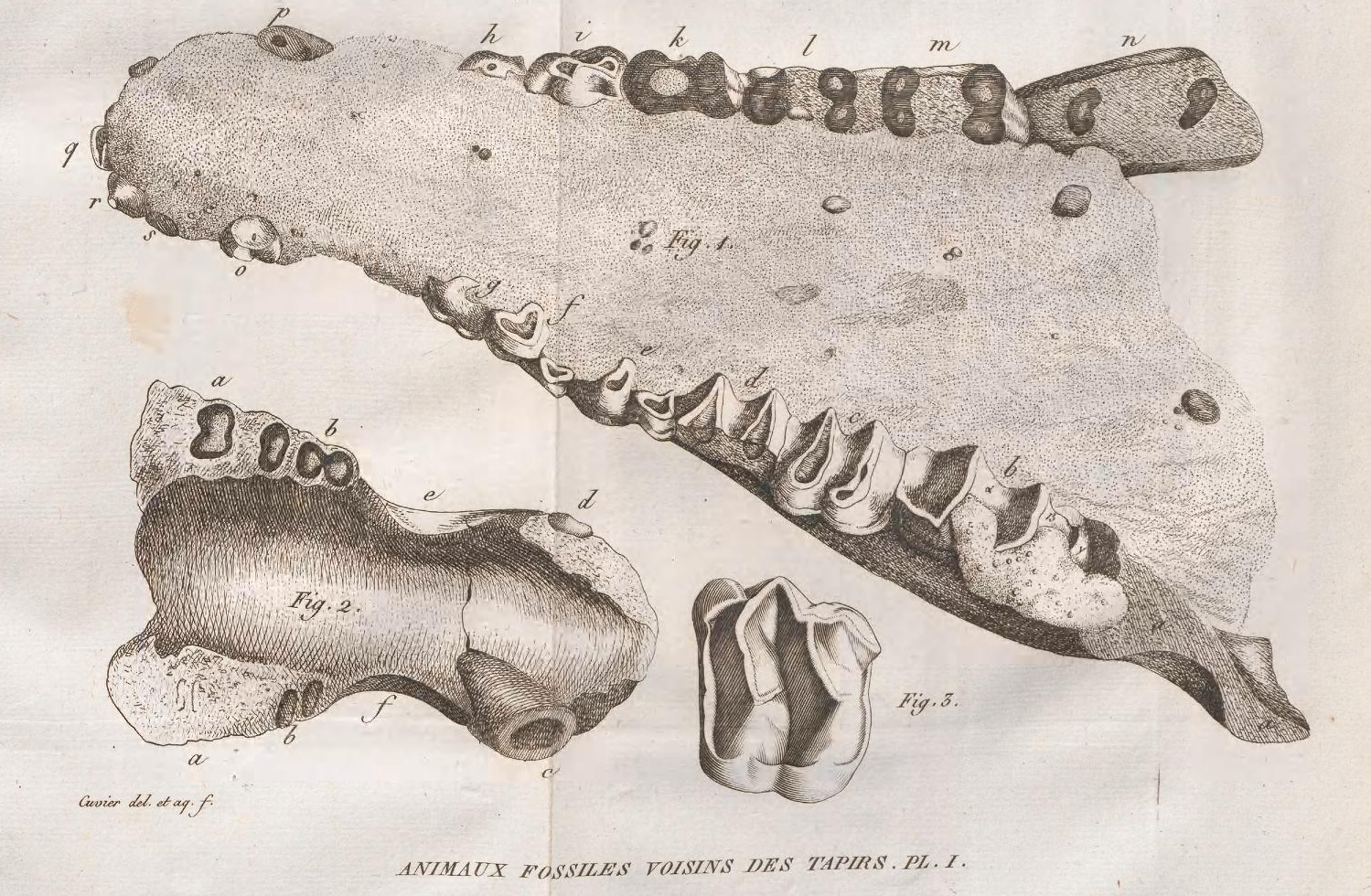
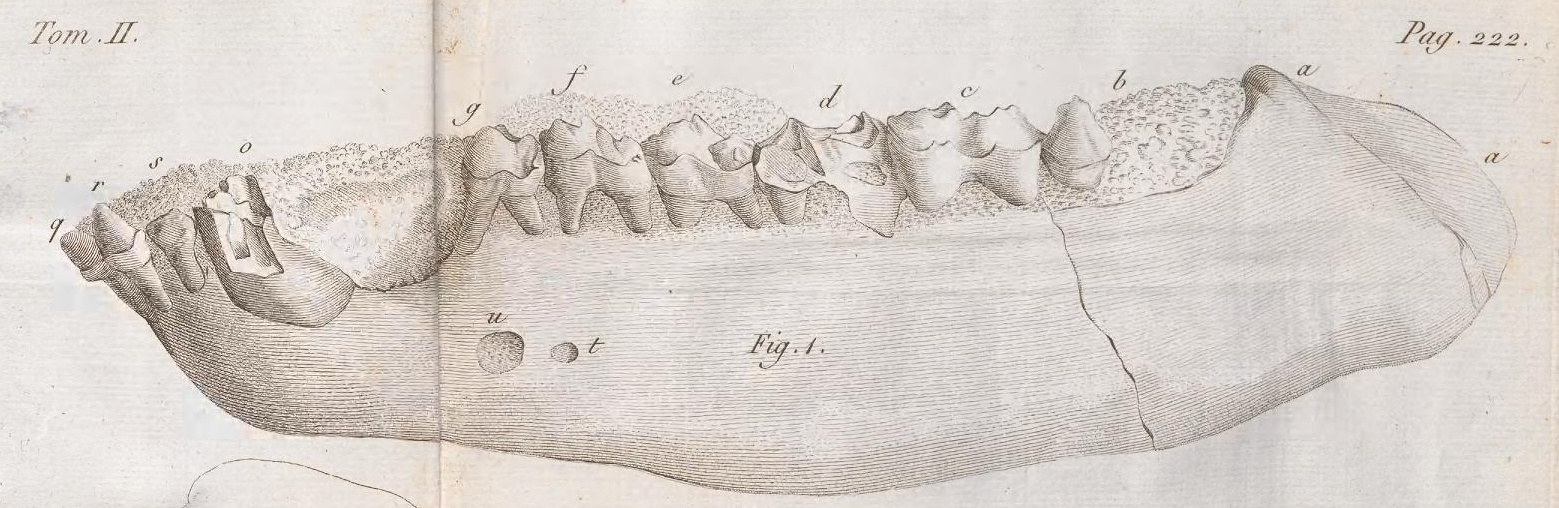
Illustrations of the lower jaws of Lophiodon tapirotherium from Issel including one mostly complete one featured in both images, 1822

Within the same second volume book, Cuvier said that he recognized multiple species of Lophiodon of various sizes from various localities, many of which he did not assign their own species names. Consisting of dental, cranial, and dental material, the fossils described by Cuvier as within Lophiodon were found by various different individuals who themselves uncovered them in many French localities, namely the French commune of Issel within the department of Aude, commune of Argenton-sur-Creuse within Indre, the hill range called Vosges (more specifically the Bastberg Hill near the commune of Bouxwiller (or "Buchsweiler") within the department of Bas-Rhin, commune of Soissons in Aisne, the French village of Boutonnet near the city of Montpellier, and from the valley Valdarno (or the Arno Valley). Cuvier considered multiple species he named within Palaeotherium to be in Lophiodon, like L. tapiroïdes and L. buxovillanum from Bouxwiller. The same year, French zoologist Anselme Gaëtan Desmarest formalized the listings of species within Lophiodon and also considered Tapirotherium to be synonymous with it, deriving L. tapirotherium of Issel from the former genus name. In 1829, German naturalist Johann Baptist Fischer relisted Lophiodon species previously described by Cuvier but wrote of additional species names based on the fossils that Cuvier had already described without having assigned names to them: L. Isselense of Issel and L. medium, L. minutum, and L. minimum of Argenton.

Several species from Europe and North America have been classified to Lophiodon before being assigned to different genera (usually newly erected ones) throughout the 19th century while several other species have been synonymized with other species including those of Lophiodon. For instance, in 1833, German naturalist Johann Jakob Kaup established the name L. Goldfusii based on molars. In another source, he erected the genus Chalicotherium based on fossils from the Grand Duchy of Hesse, transferring "L." Goldfussii into the taxon as Chalicotherium Goldfussii. In 1845, British palaeontologist Richard Owen erected the Lophiodon subgenus Coryphodon, describing it as horse-sized and roughly contemporaneous with "true" species of Lophiodon. He said that Corphodon differed from other Lophiodon species by the second and third cusps of the last lower molar that are combined into an obtuse-angled ridge. In 1846, Owen created the species name C. eocænus of the species he first recognized the previous year for Coryphodon when it was named. It was later in 1847 that French palaeontologist Auguste Pomel confirmed Coryphodon to be a distinct genus from Lophiodon, although he erected another subgenus Pachynolophus. In 1850, German palaeontologist Heinrich Georg Bronn considered Pachynolophus to be a distinct genus, of which "L." duvali was its type species. Several other mammal genera from Europe and North America whose species were initially classified in Lophiodon were Hyrachyus, Chasmotherium, Helaletes, Tapiravus, Heptodon, Colodon, Moropus, and Isectolophus.

==== Late 19th century taxonomy ====
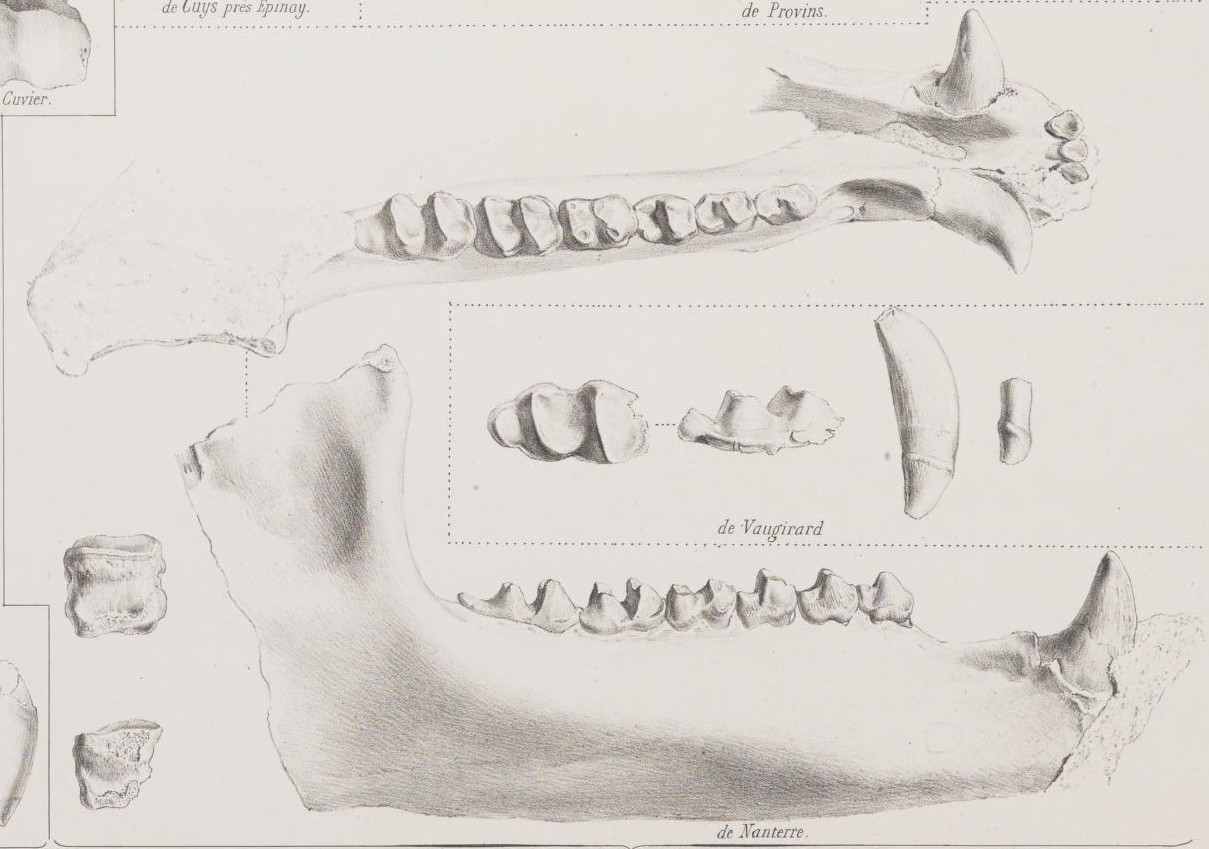
Illustrations of cranial and dental fossils of L. parisiense from Nanterre and Vaugirard, 1839–1864

In an 1848–1852 work, French palaeontologist Paul Gervais wrote of the species L. parisiense, basing it on fossils from Nanterre, Passy, Vaugirard and potentially Provins that were previously described by other palaeontologists like Blainville in his osteology series of fossil animals. In 1851, French naturalist Jean-Baptiste Noulet wrote of a large-sized lower jawbone donated by Mr. Belhomme in 1845. The fossil was previously collected by Count de Foucaud at his estate in Braconac in the French commune of Lautrec; he gave it to Belhomme to be kept within the French city of Toulouse and presented to the local municipality. Having studied the fossil repeatedly, he presented it to fellow French palaeontologist Édouard Lartet, who agreed with him on the bones having belonged to a new species of Lophiodon. Noulet cited his inspiration of French palaeontologist Charles Léopold Laurillard and his pledge for Belhomme and later Lartet to specifically publish research on de Foucaud's fossil as the reason of the article on what he considered to be an "interesting discovery." He continued that the mandible in question consisted of three incisors, a canine, and six molars on each side. He felt that the dental formula and the dental anatomy clearly proved that the fossil belonged to the genus Lophiodon but was initially unsure of what to make out of the double crescent ridges of the back molars. He later observed Cuvier's descriptions and figures of Lophiodon and found it to be in common with Lophiodon rather than other mammals like rhinoceroses and Palaeotherium. He also described the fossil as being a third larger than L. tapiroides from Bouxwiller. He gave the fossil the species name L. Lautricense, also listing the name "Lautrec's Lophiodon" in reference to the locality that the lower jaw was found at.

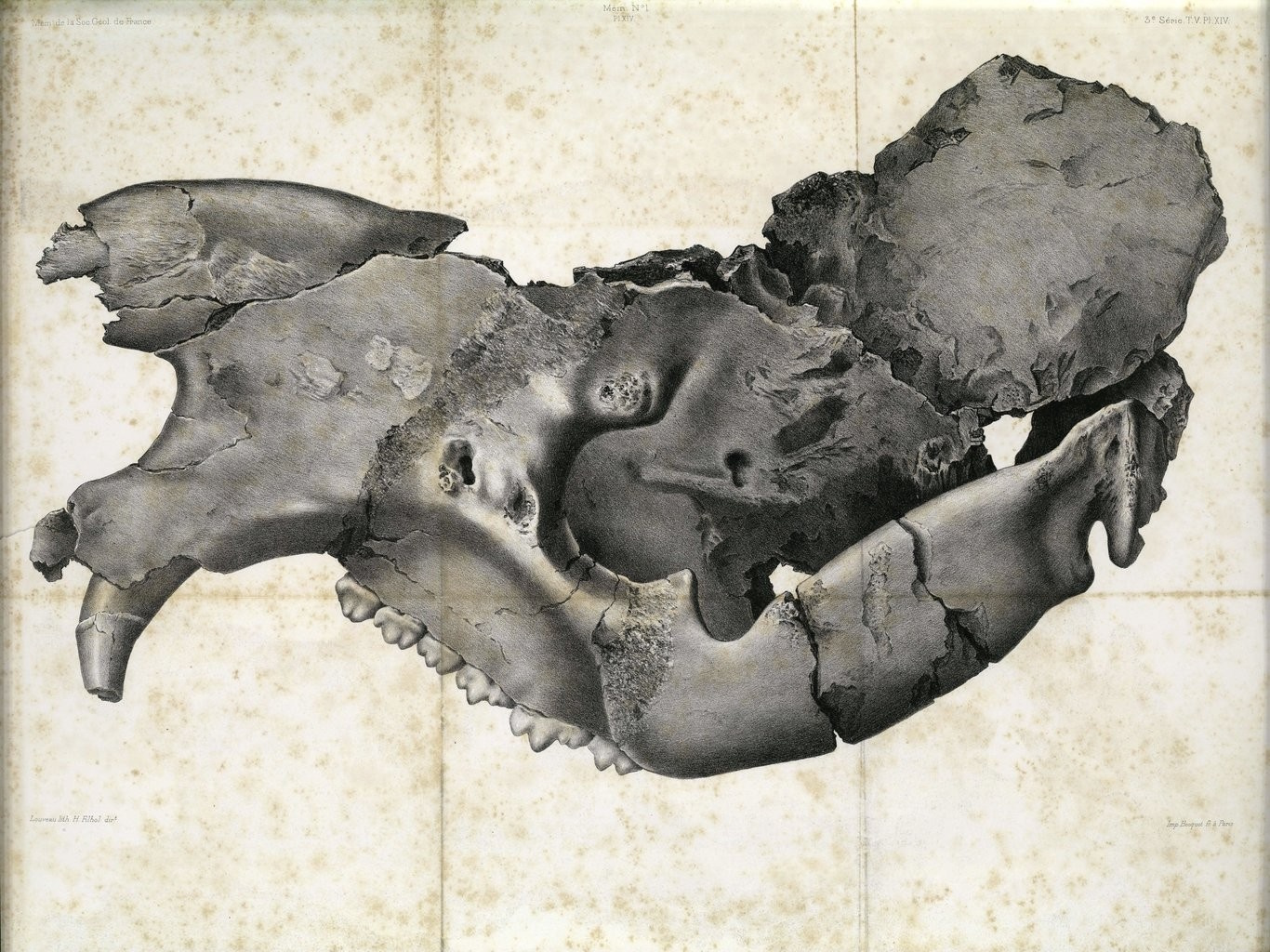
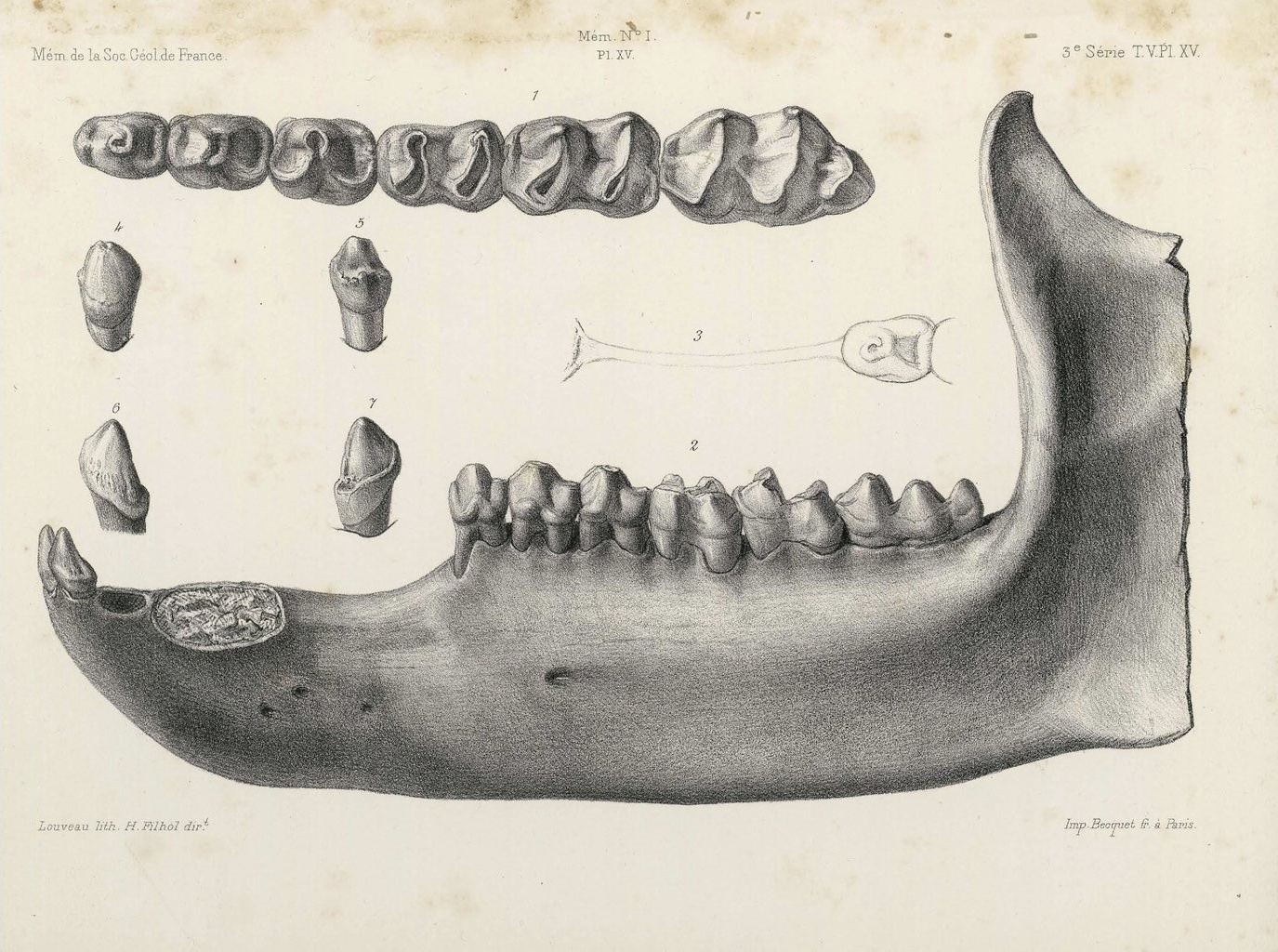
Illustrations of the cranium (left) and mandible and lower dentition (right) of L. cuvieri from Aizy-Jouy, 1888

In 1862, Swiss palaeontologist Ludwig Ruetimeyer studied fossils of multiple species of Lophiodon, including dental material from the Swiss municipality of Egerkingen. Among the teeth that he was able to identify was a large-sized canine, which he suggested had a resemblance to those found in carnivorous animals. As a result, he said, he designated the fossil material to the large-sized species L. rhinocerodes. In 1864, French palaeontologist Adolphe Watelet wrote a letter to Gabriel Auguste Daubrée of the French Academy of Sciences regarding a new species of Lophiodon in the French commune of Aizy-Jouy at the department of Aisne, which was read by the society's secretary. The fossils, discovered by quarrymen, were first written about in an article dating to 21 April of 1863 by a Soissons librarian by the name of Mr. Calland. The exclusive news report was written by the librarian and an editor but reportedly never listed any genus name and did not elaborate on the importance of the discovery. Watelet wrote that the discovery was of a large and complete Lophiodon skull, which he considered to be a "triumph of science", especially due to how typically fragmented the fossils of the genus were. He designated the fossils to the species name L. cuvieri as a tribute to Georges Cuvier.

In 1876, Gervais wrote of various bone fragments from the French commune of Saint-Ouen-sur-Seine, including a lumbar vertebra, scapula, astragalus, calcaneum, and the upper part of either a metacarpal or metatarsal bone. Considering the animal to be of the order Edentata and noticing anatomical similarities to Macrotherium and Ancylotherium, he proposed that the bones were distinct enough for the individual animal to belong to a separate genus and species that he named Pernatherium rugosum. In 1878, French palaeontologist Armand Victor Lemoine listed another new species L. Remensis but did not further elaborate on how the species came to be recognized. In 1879, Lemoine elaborated that at the French city of Reims were fossils of multiple species of Lophiodon including L. parisiense and the previously named L. remense based on a large chunk of a skull and other bones. In 1888, French palaeontologist Henri Filhol erected L. leptorhynchum based on two partial maxillae from land bordering the commune of Cesseras and referenced Watelet's 1864 naming of L. cuvieri and decided to continue using the name in application of the skull that was not previously illustrated until the 1888 work. The naturalist also described a partial lower jaw from Cesseras given to him by his colleague Joseph Henri Ferdinand Douvillé, describing the dentition as similar to Lophiodon but arguing that it was not of the same genus because of an absence of a third lobe on the last molar. He gave it the new genus name Cesserasictis and the species name Cesserasictis antiquus.

==== 20th–21st century taxonomy ====
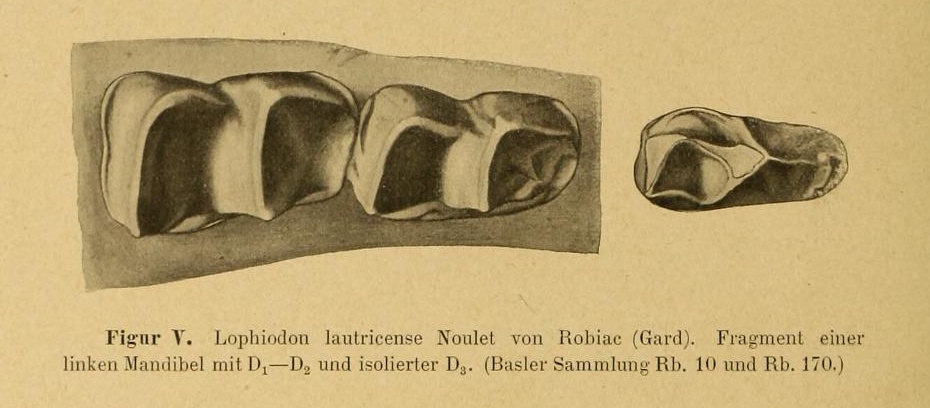
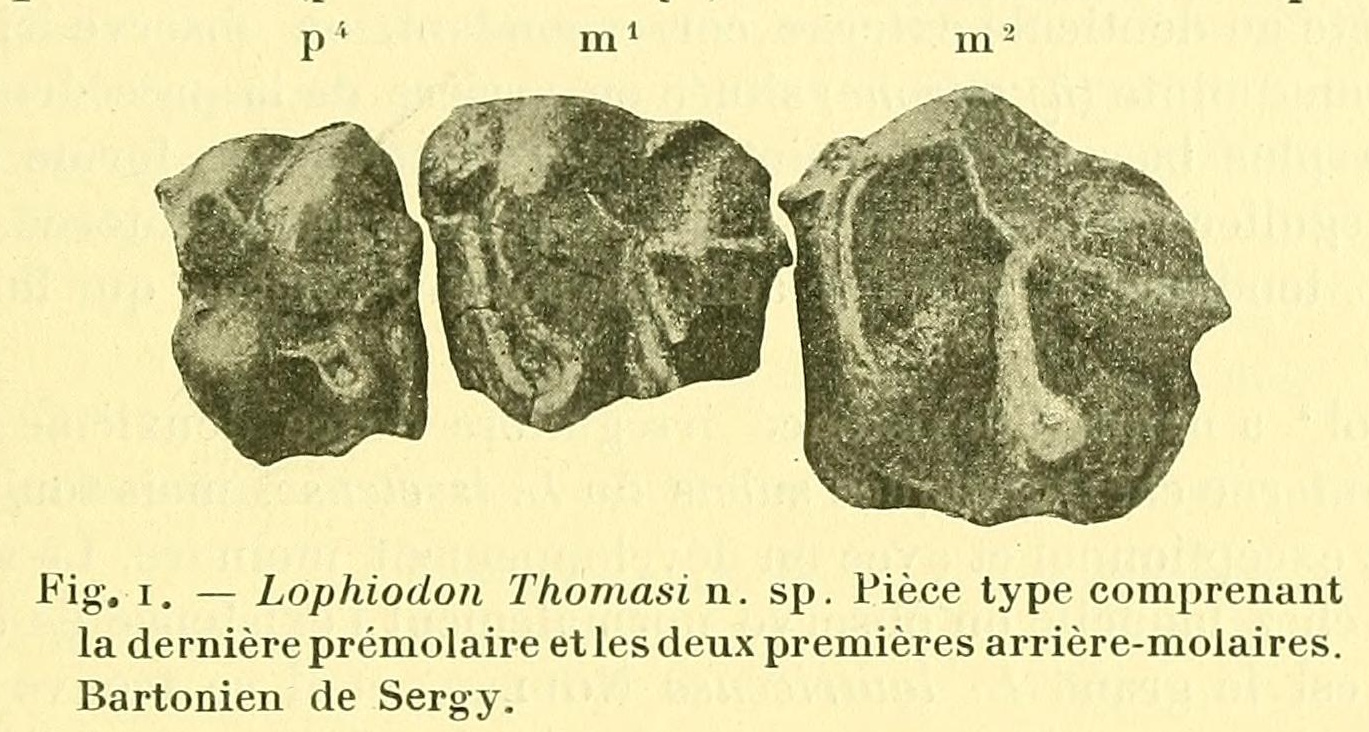
1903 illustration of the lower dentition of L. lautricense (left) and 1906 image of the upper dentition of L. thomasi (right)

In 1902, Italian palaeontologist Carlo De Stefani presented a note from his colleague Camillo Bosco. In the note, Bosco wrote of fragments of a perissodactyl's jaw that was sent to a geological museum of the University of Pisa by the Monteponite mining engineer and director Emilio Ferraris in 1882 from the province of South Sardinia. He continued that in 1891, Swiss palaeontologist Charles Immanuel Forsyth Major considered the fossils to have belonged to L. isselensis. Crediting palaeontological colleague Mario Canavari, he wrote about the specimens and assigned them to the newly erected L. Sardus. In 1903, French palaeontologist Charles Depéret synonymized Cesserasictis antiquus with L. leptorhynchus. Later the same year, Swiss palaeontologist Hans Georg Stehlin wrote an extensive study on Chasmotherium and Lophiodon, considering L. minimum to be a valid species but instead belonging to Chasmotherium. He also synonymized multiple species classified within Lophiodon that were erected by other palaeontologists in the 19th century. In 1906, palaeontologist H. Thomas wrote about Lophiodon remains from a marl pit in Soissons, initially having thought that the tooth fragments belonged to L. parisiensis. He visited the marl pit again and found more complete specimens; Stehlin and French palaeontologist Depéret both determined that the fossils belonged to an undocumented species of Lophiodon, the latter of whom agreed to study it. Depéret wrote that the Lophiodon species in question was medium-sized, was found near the commune of Fère-en-Tardenois in Aisne, and was known from a series of upper molars along some premolars and an incisor. He named the species L. thomasi, dedicating it to H. Thomas for having found the fossils. In 1910, Depéret erected the lophiodont genus Lophiaspis, reclassifying "Lophiodon" occitanicus as one of its species. In 1918, Stehlin wrote about Pernatherium rugosum, which he said had not been referenced by any naturalist other than Gervais. He stated that he wrote his thoughts on the genus as problematic back in 1909 since it did appear to have been a chalicothere, especially proven by his more recent study suggesting that the postcranial anatomy was dissimilar to them. He suggested that the foot bones were most similar to L. leptorhynchum. Thus, he considered the "Pernatherium" bones to have actually of a Lophiodon species or a closely related perissodactyl.

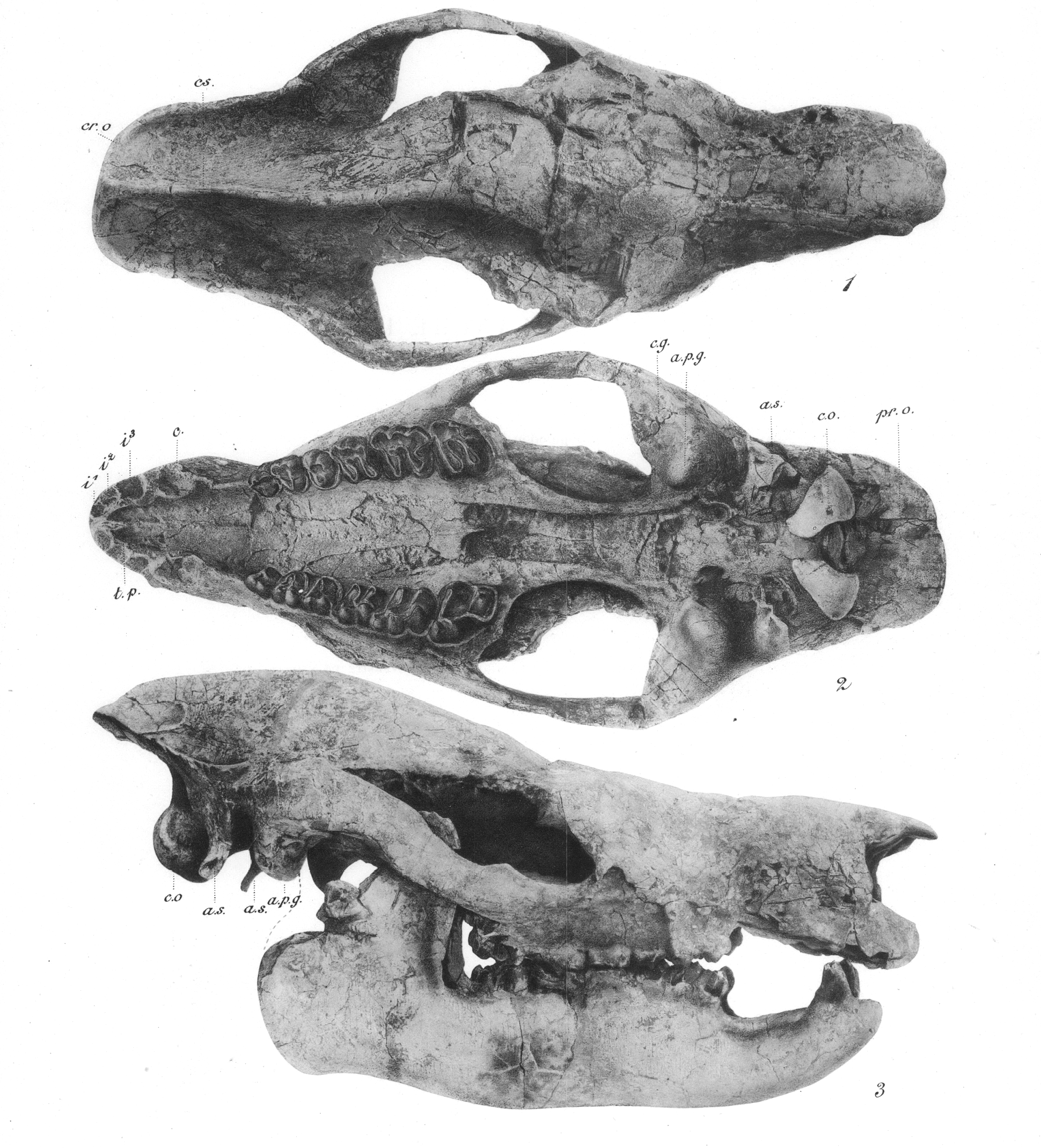
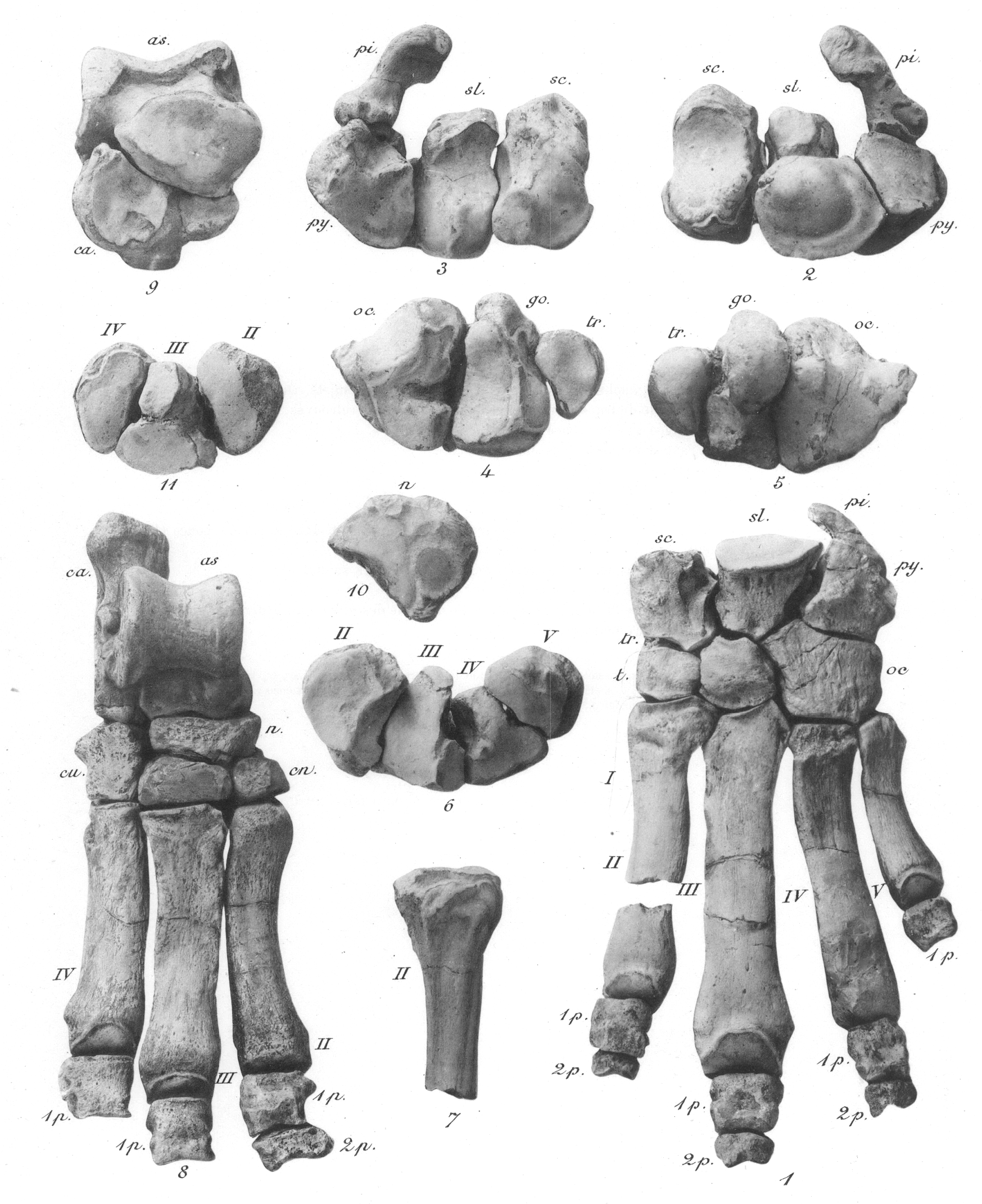
1903 photographs of a skull (left) and limb bones (right) of L. leptorhynchum from La Livinière

In 1960, French palaeontologist Gaston Astre wrote about fossils of multiple newly recognized species of Lophiodon, among them a very small species from Issel that he tentatively assigned to its own species L. glandicus, named after the stream of Glande within the same locality. He also documented a large-sized and elongated maxilla that he assigned to the erected L. compactus, named in reference to the thick and short appearance of the mandibular symphysis. In 1964, German palaeontologist Karl-Heinz Fischer synonymized multiple other previously erected Lophiodon species from previous works. In 1966, palaeontologists Donald Elvin Savage, Donald E. Russell, and Pierre Louis considered "Chasmotherium" minimum to actually be a species of Hyrachyus.

In 1977, palaeontologist Pierre Dedieu erected the lophiodont genus Paralophiodon, where "L." buschowillanus, "L." isselensis, and "L." compactus were all reclassified into. The same year, Fischer transferred "L." leptorhynchum into Lophiaspis. In 1983, Italian palaeontologists Daniela Esu and Tassos Kotsakis reclassified L. sardus into Paralophiodon. In 1994, Miguel Ángel Cuesta Ruiz-Colmenares erected L. sanmoralense, naming it after the Spanish province of Salamanca containing the locality of San Morales where the hemimandible of the species was found. In 1997, Spanish palaeontologist Lluís Checa Soler considered L. leptorhynchum to be within Paralophiodon and wrote of a new species named L. baroensis, named after the Torre de Baró site in the Ager Basin where its maxilla was found. He also wrote of another named species L. corsaensis, which was previously studied in his 1994 thesis and had its name derived from the type locality and town of Corsà in the Ager Basin where its dental fossils were found. In 2003, Jean Guy Astruc et al. listed L. glandicus and P. compactus as valid species but argued that they remain poorly documented taxa. In 2011, French palaeontologists Henri-Pierre Labarrère and Montenat erected L. eygalayense, its name being derived from Eygalayes where its fossils were found and described as intermediate in size between L. tapirotherium and L. remense. In 2018, PhD dissertation student Daniel Zoboli argued that "L." sardus could not have been within Paralophiodon because of its stratigraphic range being earlier than that of the overall genus, but he noted that a revision of the species is necessary. From 2021 onwards, multiple research papers have suggested that "P." leptorhynchum is nested within Lophiodon.

=== Classification ===
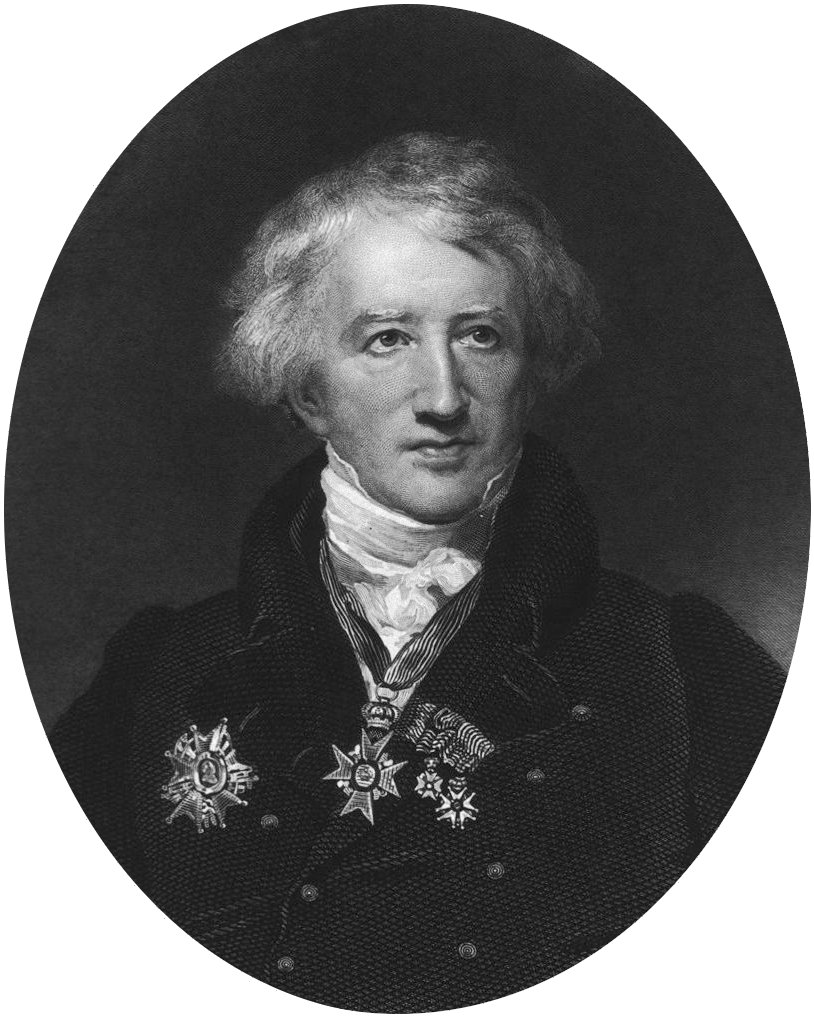
Portrait of Georges Cuvier, the French naturalist who described Lophiodon in 1822

Lophiodon is the type genus of the Lophiodontidae, one of the two main clades of the perissodactyl suborder Ancylopoda along with the Chalicotherioidea (Chalicotheriidae and Eomoropidae). The type species of Lophiodon is L. tapiroides. Lophiodonts were an endemic group of perissodactyls that first appeared in southern Europe during the Early Eocene but were spread across western Europe up until the end of the Middle Eocene. The evolutionary origins of the Lophiodontidae is unknown, and its evolutionary history is to some extent unclear. The first genus of the family to have appeared was Lophiaspis during MP7 of the Mammal Palaeogene zones. It was during MP8+9 that some of the later lophiodont genera Eolophiodon and Atalonodon made their appearances followed by Lophiodon at MP10 and Paralophiodon at MP12. Lophiodon was the latest-surviving representative of its family at MP16. Although the Lophiodontidae has comparatively low taxonomic diversity, its taxonomic history and systematics have been complicated by the likes of mischaracterized descriptions, flawed diagnoses, synonymizations, and high degrees of intraspecific variation. Despite this, the Lophiodontidae has firmly been considered a monophyletic family group, meaning that it did not leave any descendent group after its extinction.

In an article published by Quentin Vautrin et al. in 2021 is a phylogenetic analysis on some of the perissodactyls of the Palaeogene (along with a few outgroups). Within the Ancylopoda (neighboring the paraphyletic Eomoropidae), the Lophiodontidae is found to be a monophyletic clade. They considered the earliest-known lophiodontid Lophiaspis maurettei to be the sister taxon to all other members of the family based on what they found to be unambiguous synapomorphies (descendant traits shared from a common ancestor). All other species of Lophiaspis are listed on the same polytomy (or clade) as other lophiodonts within the cladogram. Paralophiodon and Lophiodon, they argued, belong to a smaller clade separate from Lophiaspis and Eolophiodon. However, they considered Paralophiodon to be polyphyletic because of P. leptorhynchum sharing the same clade as L. remensis (both the Paris Basin and Geiseltal variants) in comparison to P. buxovillanum being the sister taxon to P. leptorhynchum and Lophiodon species. They suggested that Paralophiodon therefore requires revisions. An excerpt of the phylogenetic analysis containing the Lophiodontidae is outlined below:

- Lophiodontidae
  - Lophiaspis maurettei
  - Lophiaspis baicheri
  - Lophiaspis occitanicus
  - Eolophiodon laboriense
  - - Paralophiodon buxowillanum
    - - Lophiodon baroensis
      - - Paralophiodon leptorhynchum
        - Lophiodon remense (Paris)
        - Lophiodon remense (Geiseltal)
        - Lophiodon eygaleyense
        - Lophiodon aff. eyegaleyense
        - - Lophiodon tapirotherium
          - - Lophiodon rhinocerodes
            - - Lophiodon tapiroides
              - - Lophiodon cuvieri (Paris)
                - - Lophiodon cuvieri (Geiseltal))
                  - - Lophiodon medium
                    - Lophiodon lautricense

== Description ==
=== Skull ===
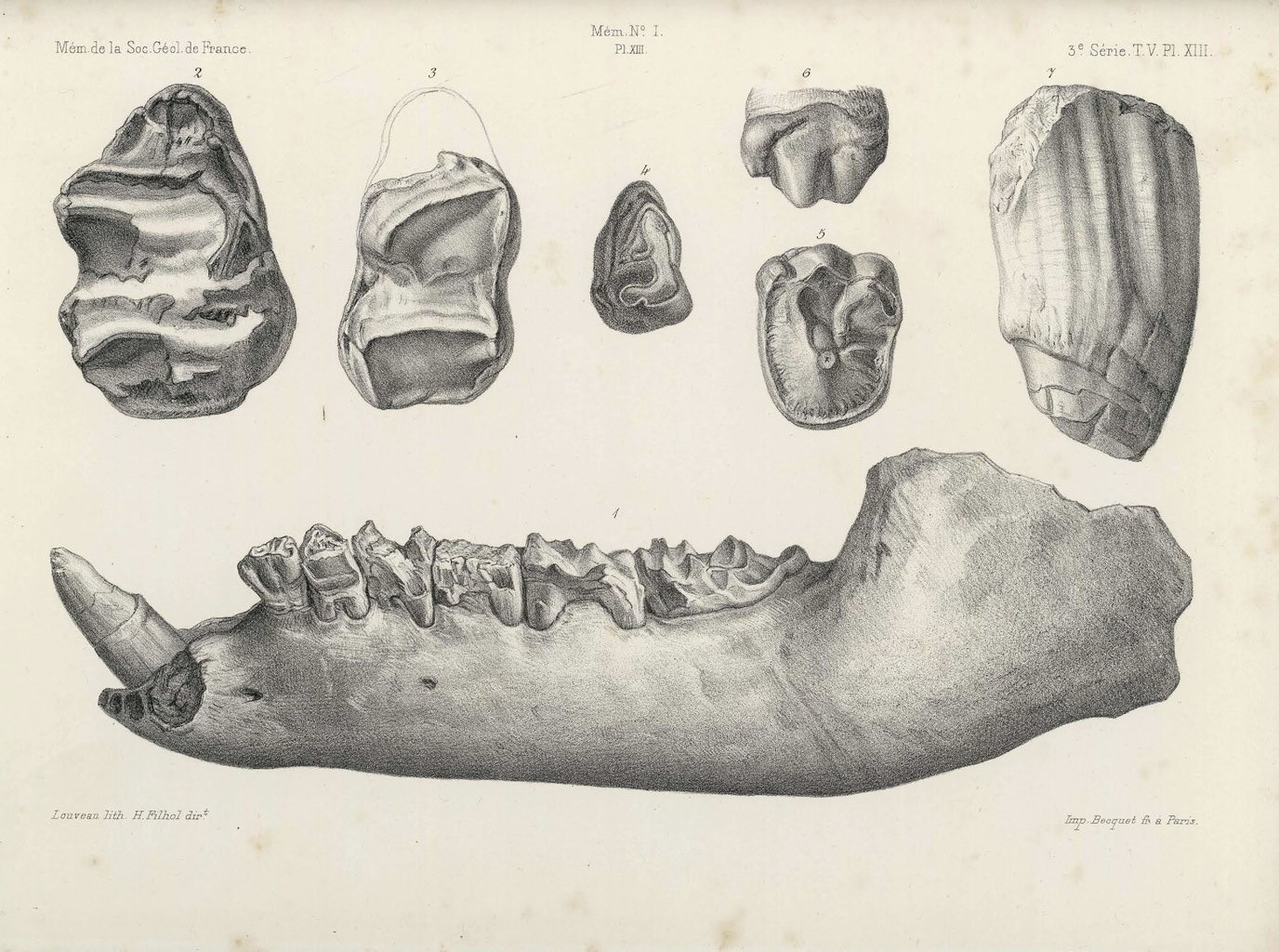
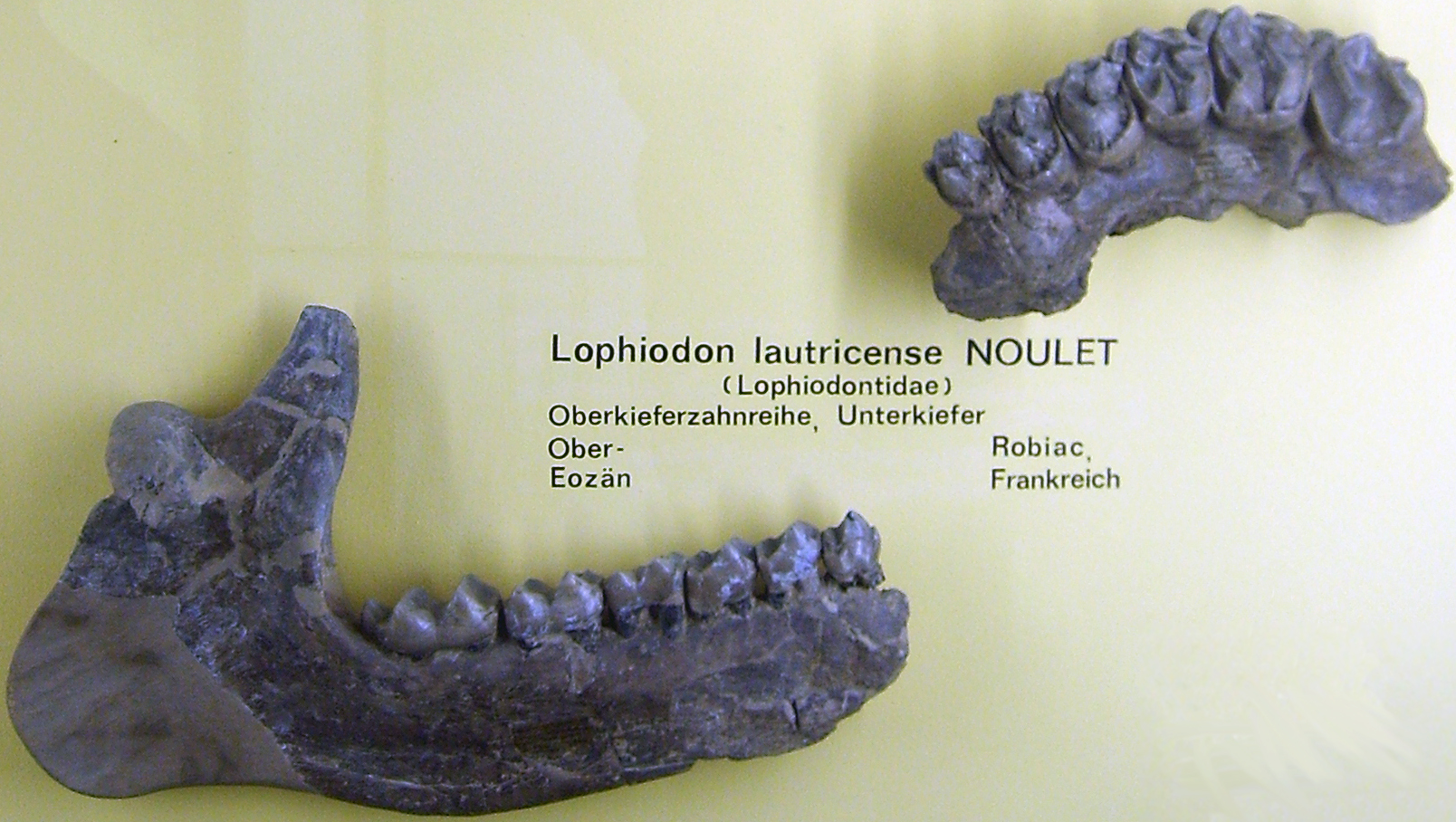
1888 illustration of the lower jaw of L. lautricense from Lautrec and other teeth of the species from other localities (left) and the lower jaw and partial upper jaw of L. lautricense from Robiac at the Natural History Museum, Berlin

The skull of Lophiodon differs greatly from those of contemporary non-lophiodont perissodactyls from the Eocene. In comparison to Eocene perissodactyls like Heptodon with the shorter braincase and the gradually narrowing rostrum the farther frontward from the braincase, in Lophiodon, the rostrum is consistently narrow and the braincase is tall to the point of a "domed" forehead appearance. Its premaxilla is longer dorsoventrally (upper back side) than anteroposteriorly (front and back), comes in contact with the nasal bone, and forms the back border of the nasoincisive incisure (notch formed by the nasal and premaxilla bones), which extends back only up to the canine's area. The premaxillary-maxillary suture is long and nearly vertical in direction. The incisive foramina of the mouth's bones are paired with each other. The nasal bones, like in other perissodactyls, are relatively narrow but are spread out from the sides at the front ends and, with the frontal bone, share a transverse suture. The cranial morphology of Lophiodon suggests the lack of proboscis unlike in some other perissodactyls like Tapirus, contradicting historical and outdated interpretations of Lophiodon as having a trunk. Sexual dimorphism is known in lophiodonts like L. leptorhynchum, where males have higher sagittal crests, although no sexual variation of the mandible is known.

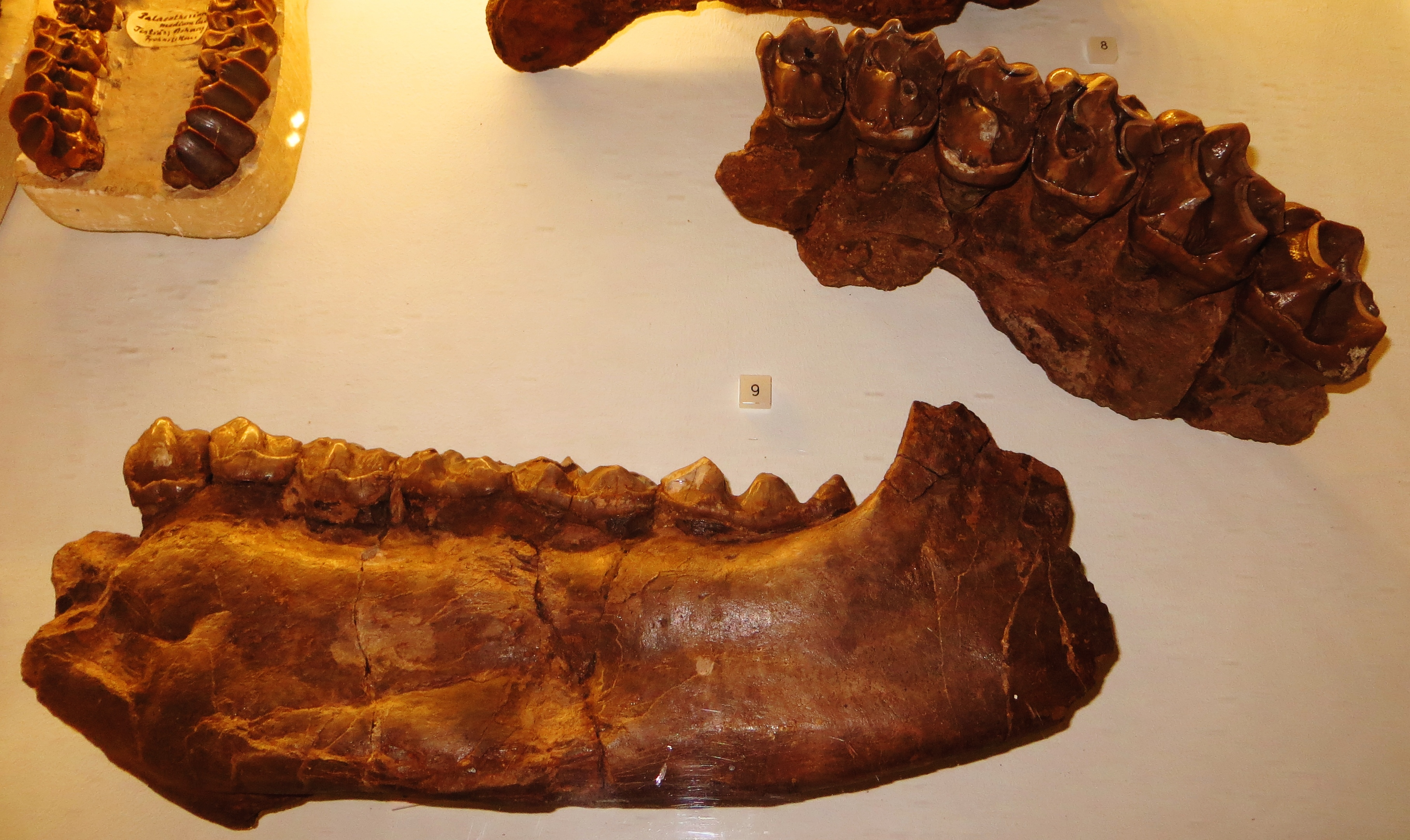
L. rhinocerodes jaws, Paleontological Collection of the University of Tübingen

The rostrum's sides are largely made up of the maxilla itself, a trait recorded in many other Eocene perissodactyls. Lophiodon lacks a clear maxillary fossa but has an infraorbital foramen above P^{3}, or the third upper premolar (P/p). The maxilla extends as far back as the maxillary tuberosity to form the front area of the orbit. Multiple sutures are present on the lacrimal bone, which has a noticeable but moderate-sized facial portion like in some Eocene perissodactyls like Hyrachyus. A lacrimal tubercle is also located within the lacrimal bone of the lophiodont. Both the jugal bone and the squamosal bone share a horizontal suture (lying above the latter), and the front end of the former is in front of the mandibular fossa. The palatine bones are similar to those of other perissodactyls and retains primitive features from within the order. The frontal and parietal bones are the main components of the braincase's roof. Like in other perissodactyls, the parietal bone connects with the frontal bone, squamosal, and occipital bone.

In the squamosal bone, its postglenoid process is relatively large, thick, and is faced anterolaterally, a direction also seen in tapiroids and rhinocerotoids. Lophiodon likely did not have a postglenoid foramen. Its mandibular fossa has a roughly trapezoidal shape with a distinct front edge separating it from the rest of the squamosal bone. The occipital bone is like those of other perissodactyls including in being vertical. The two mandibles of each Lophiodon individual are fused rigidly with each other due to a robust mandibular symphysis that extends all the way back to P_{2}. Other than the robustness of the mandible, its morphology is overall not much different from other Eocene perissodactyls.

=== Dentition ===
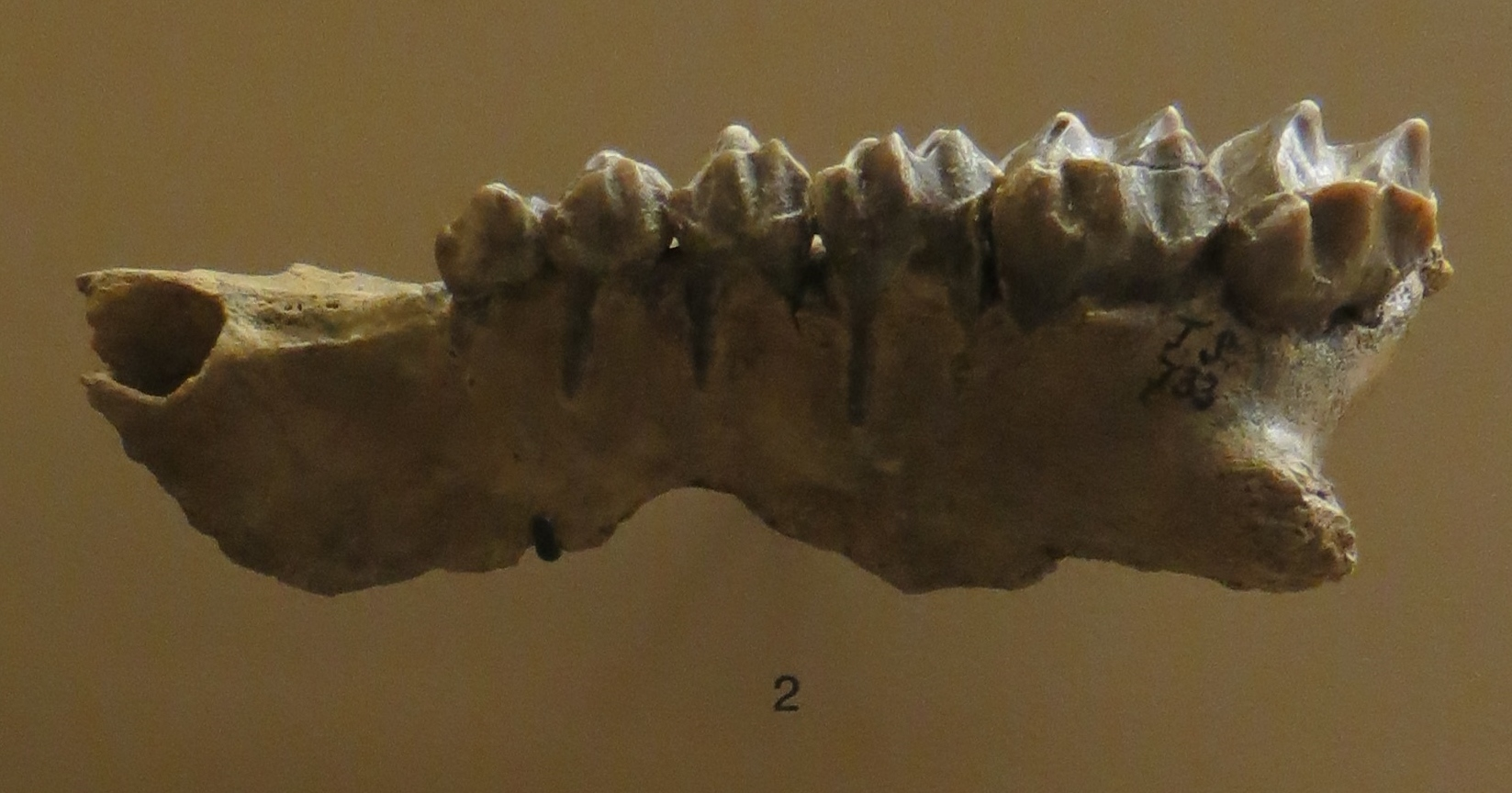
L. remensis jaw, Natural History Museum of Basel

The Chalicotheriidae and Lophiodontidae are linked together phylogenetically within the suborder Ancylopoda by several dental traits like the reduction in size of the metaconule cusp of the upper molars (M/m), strong back curve of the parastyle cusp on the upper molars, and the loss of P_{1}. The Lophiodontidae itself is diagnosed by its own dental traits, namely the close proximity of the paracone and metacone cusps in P^{3}, slight lingual tilt of the metacone in the upper molar, slight buccal tilt of the upper molar, and a slight angle change of the paracristid of the lower molars. Whereas the basal Lophiaspis retains P^{1}, both Eolophiodon and Lophiodon have evolutionary lost it. Lophiodon has a dental formula of 3.1.3.33.1.3.3 for a total of 42 teeth. The genus' canines (C/c) are very robust, and its postcanine diastemata are lengthy. The premolars are simpler in form than the molars but show a gradual molarization (molar-like forms) in more recent species. The protocone cusp of the upper premolars have protoloph crests. The hypocone cusp and metaloph crest of the molars, whenever they are present, have weak forms. The metacone on the upper molars are positioned in the lingual area, have a longitudinal extension, and labially flat. The parastyle is robust and separate from the protocone. The mesostyle cusp is present in M^{1} to M^{3} while the paraconule has a bare presence in M^{1} only. M_{3} has a robust hypoconule on it. The lower molars hardly have any ridges connecting between the transverse lophs.

Of the three upper incisors (I/i), I^{2} is the largest one followed by I^{3} then I^{1}. The lower molars have two parallel and transverse lophs and are bilophodont, the result of a protolophid crest that connects the protoconid and metaconid together. P_{4} is generally molariform while the degree of molarization in P_{2} and P_{3} varies by species. While the sequence of tooth sequence is not completely known, researchers have figured out that the premolars had replaced their deciduous counterparts prior to the eruption of the third molar, evident by a mandible described by Filhol that had P_{2}, P_{3}, and P_{4} emerging while M_{3} was still hidden. The upper and lower lophs, once at contact with each other, cut plant material with their sharp crests and pass through each other like scissor blades and steer the movements of the other until interlocking. The ectoloph and parastyle on the buccal side and the protocone and hypocone on the lingual side keep the bolus (digested food) from escaping from tooth compression, and the gaps between the latter tooth elements help the liquified bolus to flow into the mouth for digestion. The Hunter-Schreger bands, features of the tooth enamel, are aligned transversely in the buccal and lingual sides of the lower premolars and molars but curve upwards at ends at the lophs. The curved HSBs in Lophiodon and other lophiodontids are similar to those seen in the Brontotheriidae, Chalicotheriidae, and Tapiroidea. In L. leptorhynchum, sexual dimorphism is featured through larger diastemata between the canines and premolars in males. Evidence of larger canines in male L. lautricense also demonstrate sexual dimorphism like in other perissodactyls.

=== Postcranial skeleton ===
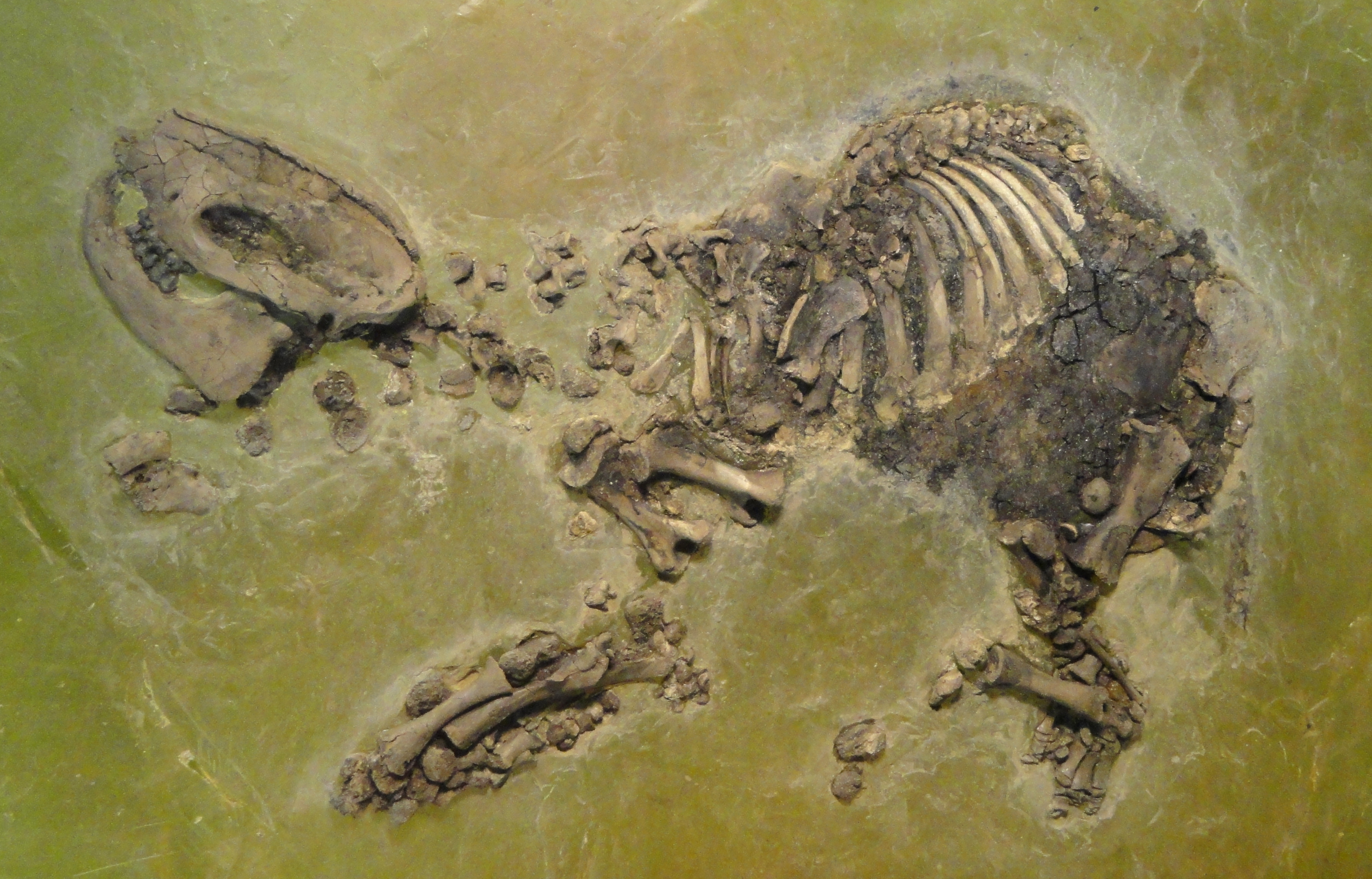
Juvenile skeleton of Lophiodon sp., Naturmuseum Senckenberg

Lophiodonts including several Lophiodon species are known by many isolated postcranial fossils. A relatively complete and articulated skeleton assigned to L. remensis has been found from the Geisel valley, although it has not yet been described in detail. Several other articulated specimens of Lophiodon have been recorded from the site as well. A complete skeleton of a juvenile specimen from the Messel Formation assigned to Lophiodon sp. is currently held at the Naturmuseum Senckenberg but has not yet had a published study about it (a tooth from the same locality had also been assigned to Lophiodon sp.). Within what evidence has been known and described of the spinal column, the atlas (C1) of the cervical vertebrae is wide compared to those of smaller Eocene perissodactyls but otherwise has a similar morphology to them. The axis (C2) is also similar to those of other perissodactyls with a long and low spinous process, its odontoid process being slightly flat as typically characteristic of the order. The scapula, incomplete in fossil evidence, was probably less rectangular than in smaller and more cursorial perissodactyls based on the large shape of the infraspinous fossa. The spine of the scapula is robust and high, extending back to the neck of the glenoid region.

The humerus is robust with strong crests on it. Whereas the greater tubercle is thick and extends forward beyond the head, the lesser tubercle is much thinner and is nearly merged with the head. The head of the humerus of Lophiodon is large and roughly hemispherical in form but is also slightly elongated in the anteroposterior direction like those of other perissodactyls. The capitulum of the humerus is extended further back than the trochlea of the humerus, altering the angle of the distal articulation. The proximal end of the radius is divided into the medial and lateral concave and shallow facets that articulate with the humerus' capitulum and trochlea, respectively. The shallowness of the facets in Lophiodon differ from those of more cursorial perissodactyls. The olecranon process on the ulna is robust but relatively short in comparison to other perissodactyl members. A fossilized front foot of L. leptorhynchum from the commune of La Livinière is the only evidence for the bones' robustness and there being seven out of eight carpal bones in the manus like in other mammals; the trapezium is missing but has clear evidence of prior existence based on facets on the trapezoid bone. As opposed to in other perissodactyls where the facet on the lunate bone for the radius is a single and round facet, that of Lophiodon is divided into two distinct front and back portions. The distal end of the lunate bone is V-shaped to broadly articulate with the capitate bone and hamate bone, a trait similarly observed in many other perissodactyl groups. The hamate bone of Lophiodon is distinct in that most facets of it have clear differences with each other and are flat (one facet for the capitate is slightly concave); most other perissodactyls have a single and continuous convex facet. The front feet are tetradactyl, or four-toed, a primitive feature among many other contemporaneous perissodactyls like early palaeotheres that is also known in extant tapirs. The fifth metacarpal bone is much smaller than the others but did still have a phalanx bone and thus would have still been functional. Due to the lack of distal phalanges, it is unclear if Lophiodon had hooves as is typical for most other perissodactyls or claws like chalicotheres, the closest relatives of lophiodonts.

A pelvis of L. tapirotherium has been recorded but is otherwise too fragmented to provide much further information about its anatomy. In regard to the femur, its body is anterposteriorly flat and its femoral head is spherical in shape. The greater trochanter is to the back of the head while the lesser trochanter and third trochanter are flattened. Both the fibula and tibia are robust, and neither of them are fused to each other. The hind foot's bones are also robust and, within the tarsus, contain the likes of the astragalus, calcaneum, navicular, cuboid bone, ectocuneiform, and mesocuneiform; whether the entocuneiform was evolutionary or has not yet been recovered from the fossil record is unclear. The astragalus is stocky and has a block-like shape, its trochlear ridges being blunt and the trochlear groove being shallow in comparison to smaller Eocene perissodactyls. The calcaneum and cuboid are both also robust, but the latter's morphology along with the other pes bones are typical of the order. The hind feet are tridactyl, or three-toed, with no evidence of a first metatarsal bone.

=== Size ===
Estimated Lophiodon species size comparisons based on known fossil specimens

Throughout the entirety of their existence in the Eocene, the Lophiodontidae evolutionarily increased in body mass from the earliest and small-sized Lophiaspis species to the latest and large-sized Lophiodon species and were typically some of the latest mammals in the western European landmass. Lophiodon, relative to its family group, ranges from medium to large in size. L. lautricense, among the most recent species of lophiodonts, was the largest member of its family and is suggested to have been the size of modern rhinoceroses. In 1991, Spanish palaeontologist Miguel Ángel Cuesta Ruiz-Colmenares recorded the tooth measurements of multiple Lophiodon species. Among them, the P_{2}-P_{4} and M_{1}-M_{3} measurements of L. remensis, respectively, measured 35 mm (1.4 in) to 54.5 mm (2.15 in) and 68.5 mm (2.70 in) to 90.5 mm (3.56 in) in range (averages of 46.5 mm (1.83 in) and 80.8 mm (3.18 in), respectively). The P_{2}-P_{4} and M_{1}-M_{3} dental row measurements of L. cuvieri are 59 mm (2.3 in) to 71 mm (2.8 in) and 107 mm (4.2 in) to 121 mm (4.8 in), respectively. Another P_{2}-P_{4} measurement range of P. tapirotherium is 46 mm (1.8 in) to 56 mm (2.2 in) long while that of the M_{1}-M_{3} row of P. tapirotherium is 80 mm (3.1 in) to 94 mm (3.7 in) long. Whereas the length of P_{2}-P_{4} of L. parisiense is 78 mm (3.1 in), M_{1}-M_{3} of L. tapiroides is 151 mm (5.9 in) long. The lengths of the P_{2}-P_{4} and M_{1}-M_{3} of L. leptorhynchum are 44 mm (1.7 in) to 48 mm (1.9 in) and 84 mm (3.3 in) to 88 mm (3.5 in), respectively. In L. lautricense, the lengths of M_{1} and M_{2} are 4.34 cm (1.71 in) and 5.29 cm (2.08 in), respectively; the written total length of the lower molar series is 16.34 cm (6.43 in) while that of the mandible is 51.2 cm (20.2 in).

In 2024, thesis writer Nahia Jimenez de Vicuña Calvo listed dental row measurements of various Lophiodon species. She wrote that the M_{1}-M_{3} lengths for L. baroensis and L. sanmoralense were 62.4 mm (2.46 in) to 72.3 mm (2.85 in) and about 150 mm (5.9 in), respectively. P_{2}-P_{4} of L. tapiroides, according to her, measured 78 mm (3.1 in) long. De Vicuña Calvo additionally listed P_{2}-P_{4} and M_{1}-M_{3} lengths for L. leptorhynchum (41 mm (1.6 in) to 48 mm (1.9 in), 84 mm (3.3 in) to 88 mm (3.5 in), L. cf. remensis (49 mm (1.9 in) to 53.4 mm (2.10 in), 84.2 mm (3.31 in) to 91.5 mm (3.60 in), L. remensis (35 mm (1.4 in) to 54.5 mm (2.15 in), 68.5 mm (2.70 in) to 90.5 mm (3.56 in), L. aff. eygalayense (49.9 mm (1.96 in) to 60.6 mm (2.39 in), 84.2 mm (3.31 in) to 103.2 mm (4.06 in)), L. eygalayense (45 mm (1.8 in) to 53.5 mm (2.11 in), 90 mm (3.5 in) to 91 mm (3.6 in)), L. tapirotherium (46 mm (1.8 in) to 56 mm (2.2 in), 80 mm (3.1 in) to 94 mm (3.7 in)), L. cf. tapirotherium (65.6 mm (2.58 in), 123.5 mm (4.86 in)), L. cuvieri (60.5 mm (2.38 in) to 81.5 mm (3.21 in)), L. rhinocerodes (91 mm (3.6 in) to 103 mm (4.1 in), 168 mm (6.6 in)), L. lautricense (89 mm (3.5 in) to 112 mm (4.4 in), 150 mm (5.9 in) to 191 mm (7.5 in)), and L. sp. from the Spanish region of Sobrarbe (82.8 mm (3.26 in), 124.7 mm (4.91 in) to 125.5 mm (4.94 in)).

In 2015, Jean-Albert Remy calculated the body mass of several Eocene European perissodactyl species based on a formula originally proposed by Christine M. Janis in 1990. He estimated that the largest lophiodont L. lautricense could have weighed as much as 1,903 kg (4,195 lb), making it by far the largest perissodactyl of western Europe during the time of its existence. Likewise in 2015, Céline Robinet et al. suggested that L. lautricense could have weighed more than 2,000 kg (4,400 lb) based on tooth formula estimates, strongly contrasting with the 20 kg (44 lb) to 60 kg (130 lb) weight of the basal Lophiaspis maurettei. In 2019, Vautrin et al. listed weight estimates of L. lautricense using formulas based mainly on dentition, the mean estimate being 2,050.69 kg (4,521.0 lb). Simon J. Ring et al. in 2020 suggested that Lophiodon as a genus in Geiseltal could have ranged in weight from 68 kg (150 lb) to 404.5 kg (892 lb). In 2024, de Vicuña Calvo calculated body mass estimates for L. baroensis (62 kg (137 lb) to 102 kg (225 lb)), L. cf. remensis (151 kg (333 lb) to 260 kg (570 lb)), L. remensis (111 kg (245 lb) to 318 kg (701 lb)), L. corsaensis (62 kg (137 lb) to 102 kg (225 lb)), L. aff. eygalayense (235 kg (518 lb) to 367 kg (809 lb)), L. eygalayense (233 kg (514 lb)), L. tapirotherium (212 kg (467 lb) to 347 kg (765 lb)), L. cf. tapirotherium (588 kg (1,296 lb)), L. cuvieri (391 kg (862 lb)), L. rhinocerodes (2,117 kg (4,667 lb)), L. lautricense (1,045 kg (2,304 lb) to 2,525 kg (5,567 lb)), L. sanmoralense (1,383 kg (3,049 lb)), and L. sp. from Sobrarbe (774 kg (1,706 lb) to 840 kg (1,850 lb)). In 2025, Manon Hullot et al. listed mean body mass calculations for L. lautricense from Robiac (2,319.2 kg (5,113 lb)), L. tapirotherium from Saint-Martin-de-Londres (483.4 kg (1,066 lb)), L. leptorhynchum from Aumelas (326.7 kg (720 lb)), and L. cf. leptorhynchum from Naples 2 (220.1 kg (485 lb)).

== Palaeobiology ==
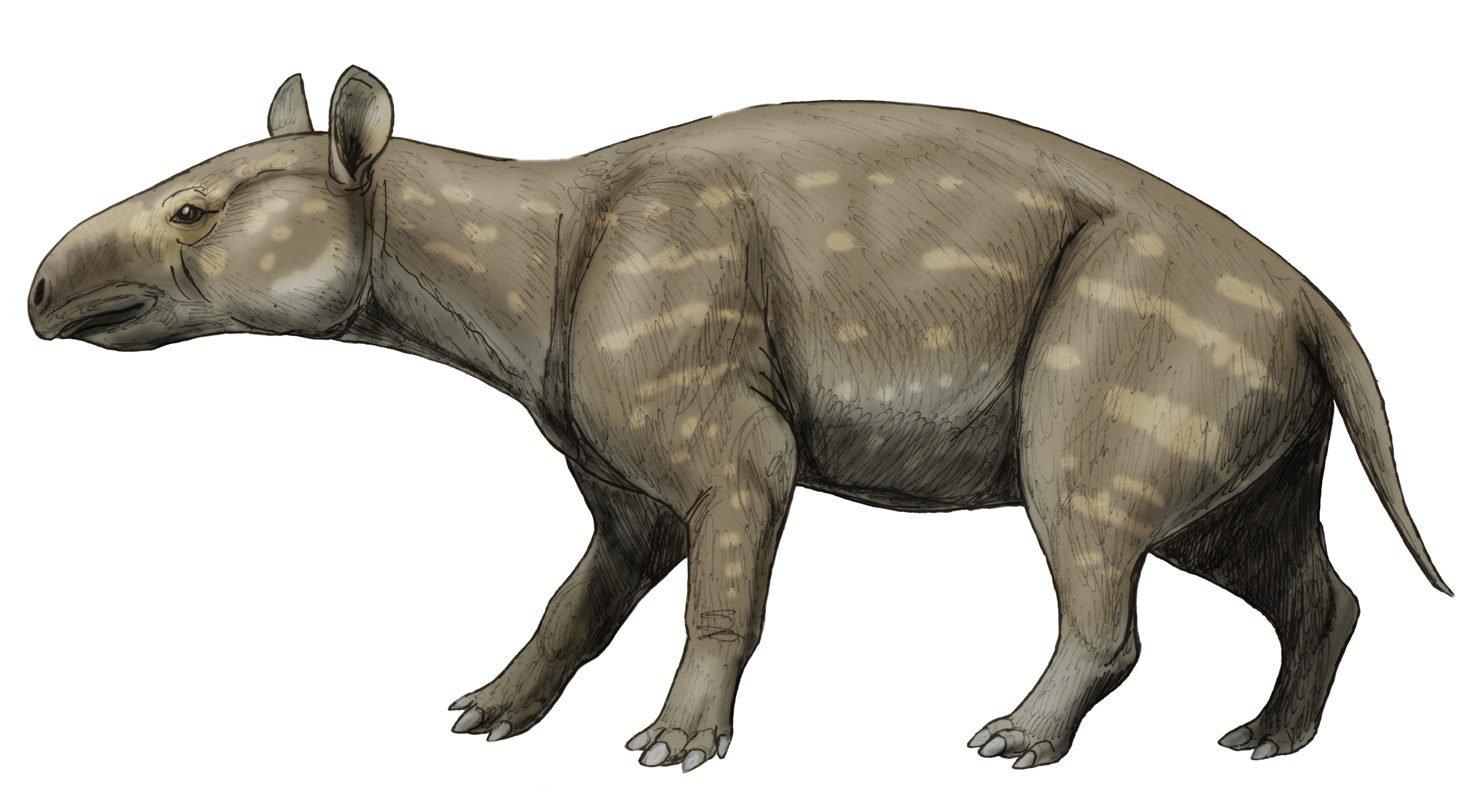
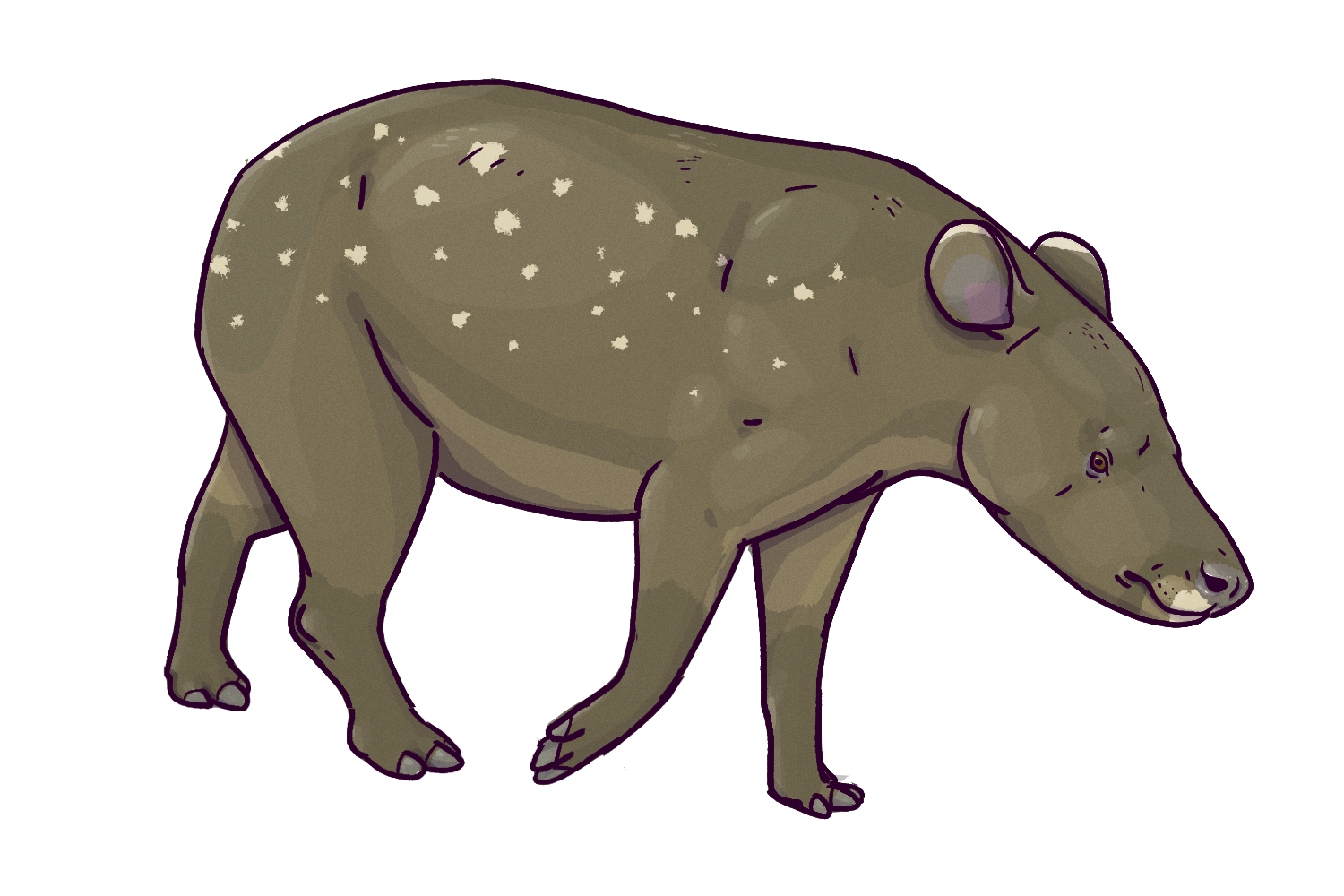
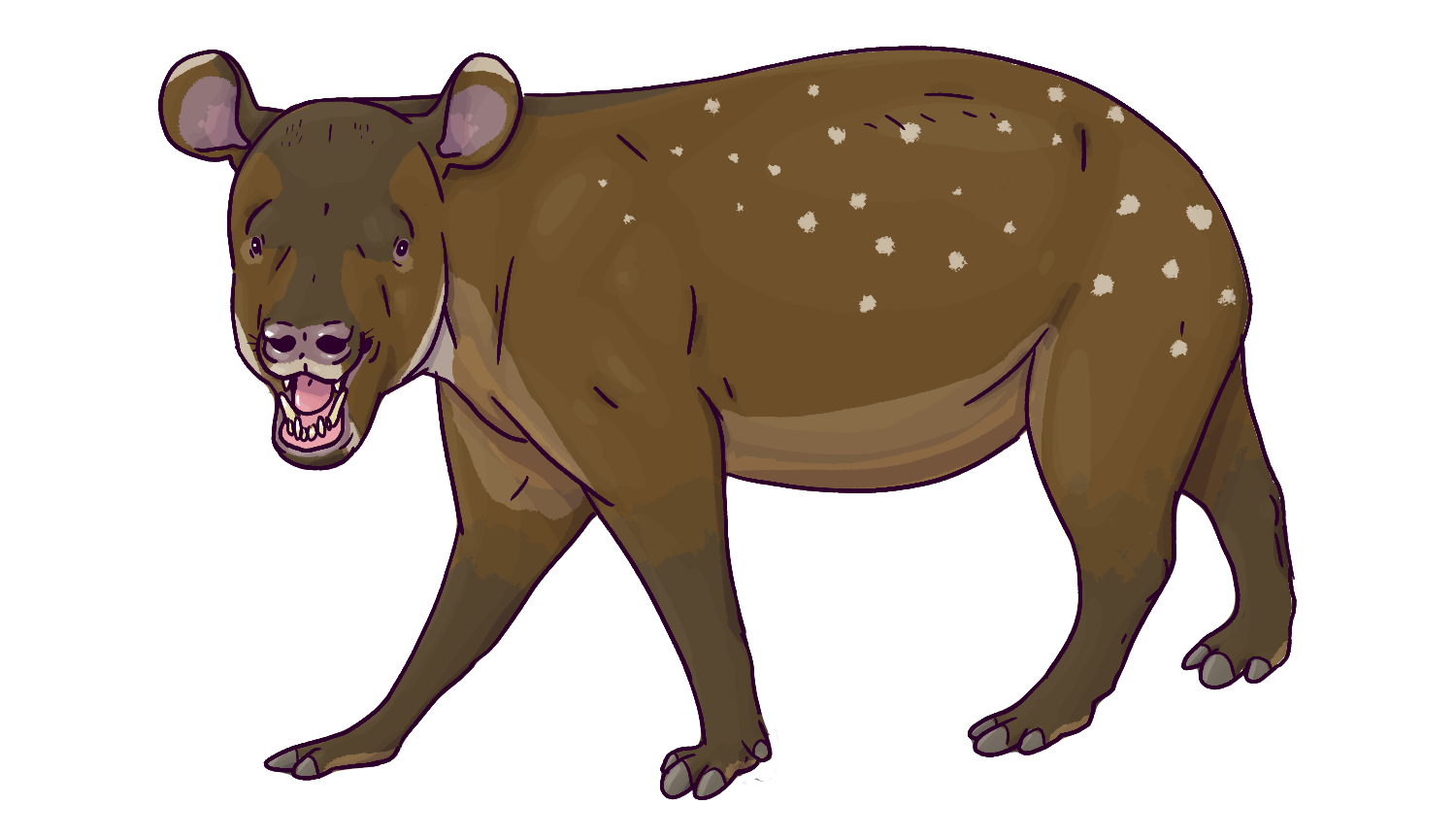
Life restorations of L. lautricense (left), L leptorhynchum (center), and L. remensis (right) based on skeletal evidence

Lophiodon species vary in size and tend to be associated with an evolutionary increase in size relative to its family, ranging from pig-sized to rhinoceros-sized. Such size increases of the family were parallel with the Brontotheriidae of North America during the Early Eocene Climatic Optimum (54 to 49 Ma), and they were matched in size locally only by the giant flightless and allegedly herbivorous bird Gastornis until MP13 in which they were unchallenged afterward. As a result, they probably played major roles in shaping their terrestrial ecosystems from the Early to Middle Eocene like today's large-sized mammals. While naturalists had historically compared lophiodonts to tapirs based on size and bilophodonty and suggested similar ecological habits, these speculations of palaeobiology are misleading or false; this is further compounded by modern research showing that lophiodonts are more related to chalicotheres than tapirids and other members of the clade Ceratomorpha. The size increases and dietary changes recorded in lophiodonts occurred during cooling climates after the EECO during the Middle Eocene, connecting with the Bergmann's rule theory that animals grow larger in response to cooler climates.

The morphology of the humerus of Lophiodon suggests that the deltoid muscle and teres major muscle operate somewhat differently from modern tapirs. Like in other humeral flexors of similarly robust modern mammals like rhinoceroses or hippopotamuses, lophiodonts have very muscularized upper arms for massive support from the forelimbs to the heavy body. Lophiodonts display a range of forelimb bone shapes that suggest different locomotive niches, with L. leptorhynchum of La Livinière having locomotor niches like the South American tapir (Tapirus terrestris) and Baird's tapir (Tapirus bairdii) that are more suited for drier and more terrestrial habitats. L. remensis of Monthelon in the Paris Basin and L. tapirotherium of Geiseltal are found in deposits suggesting more moist habitats, therefore implying different locomotor behaviours from L. leptorhynchum; this is further supported by the presumed drier and more terrestrial habitat of the fossil locality. According to Svitozar Davydenko et al. in 2023, in large species of Lophiodon, the tibiae are full of spongious bony material and a small open medullary cavity. Furthermore, a tibia of Lophiodon sp. from Egerkingen has a high distal compactness score of 0.86 at the back side of the epiphysis. The morphological traits suggest potential semi-aquatic behaviours in at least some species of Lophiodon, consistent with the suggested hippopotamid-like build of the genus. Tifanie Duprat et al. in 2025 suggested that the large postcranial morphology of Lophiodon hinted towards adaptations of wet habitats. The number of digits in the front and back feet of Lophiodon, along with its tibia being much shorter than its femur, both point towards a lack of cursoriality. In 2023, Ring et al. conducted a study on ecological dynamics of Lophiodon and the palaeothere Propalaeotherium from Geiseltal. They recorded that Lophiodon sample sizes were low where those of Propalaeotherium were high and vice versa. Furthermore, they wrote that Lophiodon had high body size variance whereas Propalaeotherium did not. The authors hypothesized that Lophiodon, based on its much larger body mass than the small Propalaeotherium, had slow metabolism, larger migratory ranges, and reduced pressure from predation to sustain longer lives. Thus, the researchers argued, the progression in size of Lophiodon even after the eventual rarity of Propalaeotherium in Geiseltal was because of progressive differences in the fast–slow continuum rather than because of ecological competition and subsequent character displacement.

While the early Lophiaspis had high radial enamel, low decussation, and straight Hunter-Schreger bands, pointing to limited abrasion in its diet, the later genera Eolophiodon and Lophiodon had higher decussation in their teeth that suggested higher consumptions of more abrasive items like branches, bark, and seeds. L. lautricense in particular had bent HSBs and was more adapted towards higher abrasive material consumptions; however, the authors also cautioned that the enamel modifications could alternatively be interpreted with body mass increase rather than higher abrasive material consumptions. Nonetheless, the higher mesowear of the species suggests more abrasive food diets. L. lautricense was probably less selective in diet and consumed lower quality and more fibrous material like branches and fruit, consistent with the feeding behaviours of other herbivores of large size that also have lower metabolic requirements. Another explanation for the feeding habits of L. lautricense is the higher degree of molarization of the premolars, which would have allowed for more efficient mastication (or chewing), consuming more abrasive food items, and more shearing in an individual's lifetime. L. tapirotherium also appeared to have consumed hard objects like branches, bark, and fruits. All other lophiodonts in comparison appear to have leaned towards softer food diets. A high dietary diversity of lophiodonts may explain the large intraspecific variations in dentition without selection pressure. The folivorous diets of lophiodonts like Lophiodon contrast strongly with the frugivorous leans from basal perissodactyls including early chalicotherioids like Eomoropus and Litolophus.

== Palaeoecology ==
=== Early Eocene ===
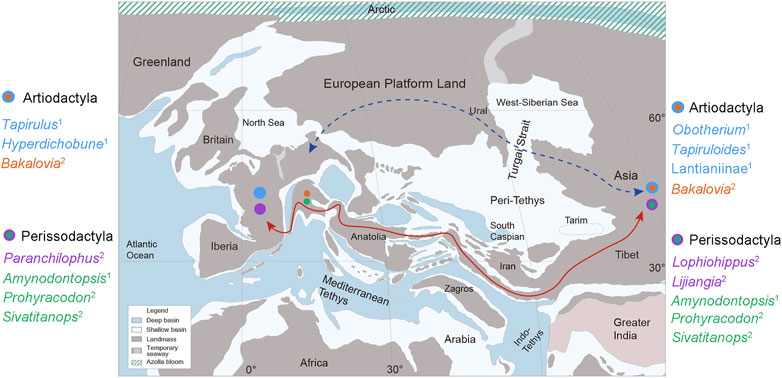
Palaeogeography of Europe and Asia during the middle Eocene with possible artiodactyl and perissodactyl dispersal routes.

For much of the Eocene, a hothouse climate with humid, tropical environments with consistently high precipitations prevailed. Modern mammalian orders including the Perissodactyla, Artiodactyla, and Primates (or the suborder Euprimates) appeared already by the early Eocene, diversifying rapidly and developing dentitions specialized for folivory. The omnivorous forms mostly either switched to folivorous diets or went extinct by the middle Eocene (47–37 million years ago) along with the archaic "condylarths". By the late Eocene (approx. 37–33 mya), most of the ungulate form dentitions shifted from bunodont (or rounded) cusps to cutting ridges (i.e. lophs) for folivorous diets.

Land connections between western Europe and North America were interrupted around 53 Ma. From the early Eocene up until the Grande Coupure extinction event (56–33.9 mya), western Eurasia was separated into three landmasses: western Europe (an archipelago), Balkanatolia (in-between the Paratethys Sea of the north and the Neotethys Ocean of the south), and eastern Eurasia. The Holarctic mammalian faunas of western Europe were therefore mostly isolated from other landmasses including Greenland, Africa, and eastern Eurasia, allowing for endemism to develop. Therefore, the European mammals of the late Eocene (MP17–MP20 of the Mammal Palaeogene zones) were mostly descendants of endemic middle Eocene groups.

The temporal ranges of most species of Lophiodon have been well-documented by multiple sources, although that of L. eygalayense is unclear beyond that it is exclusive to the Lutetian (overlapping mostly with the Middle Eocene). Multiple species were recorded as the first representatives: L. baroensis, L. corsaensis, L. remensis, which all made their first appearances at MP10 and the former two of which were exclusive to the unit. Within the Early Eocene, Lophiodon was present at what is now multiple countries, namely Spain, France, and Belgium. Its representative order Perissodactyla among other mammal orders (Primates, Artiodactyla, Hyaenodonta, etc.) were also present in the western European landmass and may have had gone through dispersal routes to and from North America and Asia prior to their eventual separations. Other large vertebrates were also present at western Europe during the Early Eocene like the giant bird family Gastornithidae and the reptile clade Crocodylomorpha.

At the MP10 locality of Grauves is L. remensis along with the likes of the metatherians Peradectes and Amphiperatherium, apatemyid Heterohyus, eylipotyphlan Macrocranion, bat Palaeochiropteryx, plesiadapiformes Platychoerops and Arcius, primates Protoadapis and Nannopithex, hyaenodont Prototomus, tillodont Franchaius, "condylarth" Phenacodus, palaeotheres Orolophus and Propalaeotherium, hyrachyid Hyrachyus, diacodexeid Diacodexis, dichobunids Protodichobune and Aumelasia, and the artiodactyl Cuisitherium.

=== Middle Eocene ===
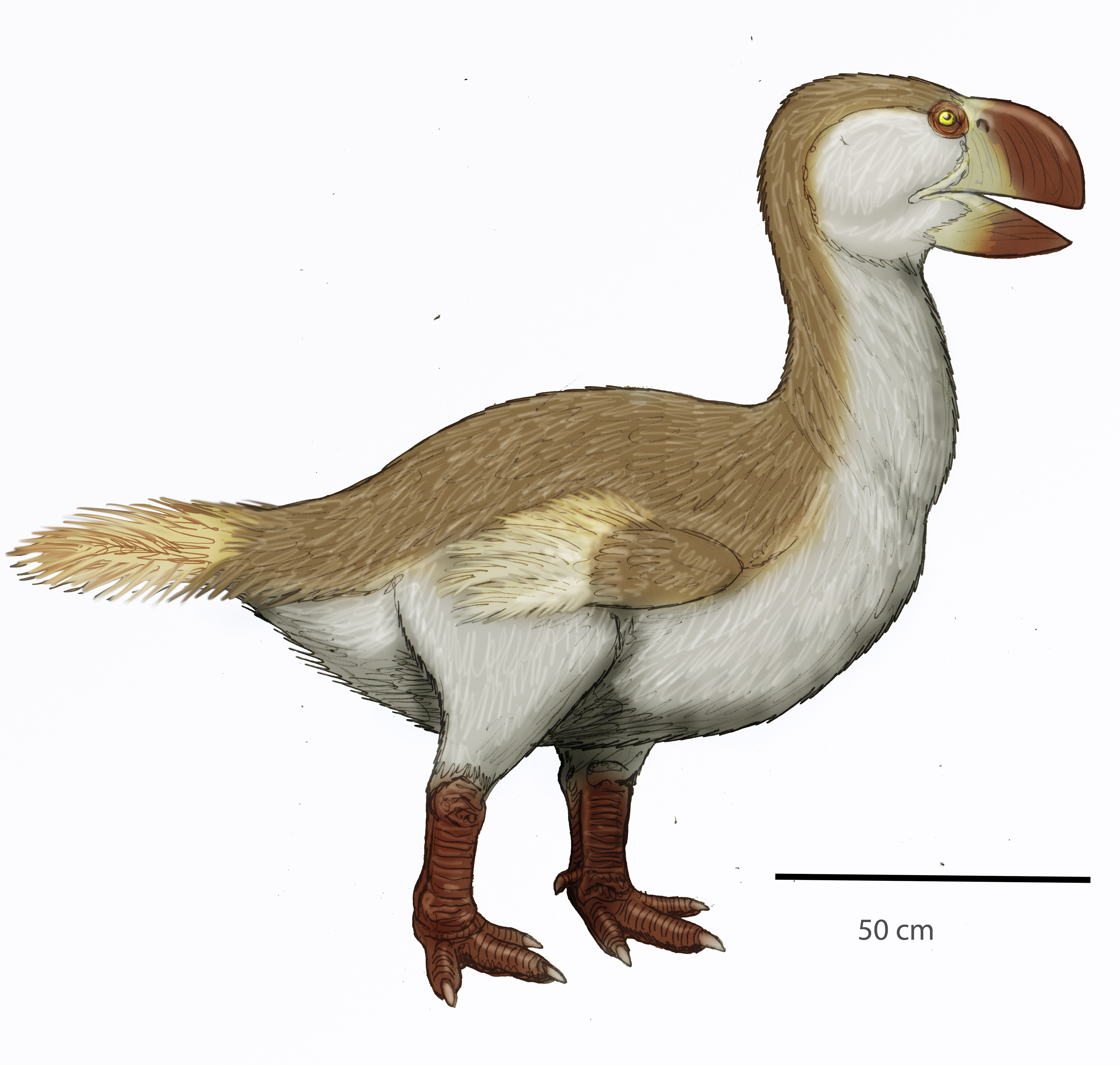
Restoration of Gastornis, a large-sized bird of the superorder Galloanserae, which coexisted with Lophiodon as some of the largest animals during much of the Early and Middle Eocene

During the Middle Eocene, fueled by the end of the Early Eocene Climatic Optimum, global climates were cooler and European environments seemingly became drier and more open. However, European environments during the Middle Eocene remained tropical and humid. From MP12 to MP14, newer artiodactyl, perissodactyl, and primate groups appeared in western Europe, many of which remained endemic to western Europe. The increased presence of endemic mammal families was the result of both climatic shifts and the separation of western Europe into an archipelago during the Middle Eocene, with endemic artiodactyls being a particular diverse group. In comparison, the Lophiodontidae was the only perissodactyl family that was endemic to western Europe, as both the Palaeotheriidae and Hyrachyidae had presences outside of the landmass at eastern Eurasia and/or North America. MP11 also marked the presences of multiple crocodylomorphs and testudines in western Europe that continued to exist well into much of the Middle Eocene, the former clade including Asiatosuchus, Iberosuchus, Diplocynodon, and Duerosuchus..

The temporal range of L. remensis is extended up to MP13 due to its presence in the Geiseltal fossil deposits dated up to the unit. L. medium and L. tapirotherium made their earliest appearances at MP11, the former species of which remained exclusive to the unit. Multiple other species appeared in MP13: L. tapiroides, L. cuvieri, and L. parisiense. The three species along with L. tapirotherium extended up to MP15 in temporal range, existing with the unit-exclusive L. rhinocerodes. L. leptorhynchum also appeared in MP13, but it is uncertain if its range had also extended up to MP15. The various Middle Eocene species of Lophiodon were reported from the United Kingdom, Portugal, Spain, France, Belgium, Germany, and Switzerland. MP13 marked the last appearance of Gastornis, making Lophiodon unambiguously the largest animal in western Europe up until its eventual extinction.

In the Egerkingen α + β localities, dating back to MP14, were L. rhinocerodes, L. tapiroides, L. cuvieri, and L. tapirotherium. Sedimentary and palaeontological evidence suggested that they lived in warm and humid forest environments. Fossil mammals that coexisted with the multiple Lophiodon species included the hyrachyids Chasmotherium and Hyrachyus, palaeotheres (Pachynolophus, Eurohippus, Propalaeotherium, Palaeotherium, Anchilophus, Metanchilophus, Lophiotherium), dichobunids (Dichobune, Hyperdichobune, Meniscodon, Mouillacitherium), cebochoerids (Cebochoerus, Gervachoerus, mixtotheriid Mixtotherium, choeropotamids Haplobunodon and Rhagatherium, anoplotheriids Dacrytherium and Catodontherium, tapirulid Tapirulus, xiphodonts Dichodon and Haplomeryx, artiodactyl of ambiguous affinity Leptotheridium, amphimerycid Amphimeryx, hyaenodonts (Eurotherium, Prodissopsalis, Cynohyaenodon, Proviverra, Allopterodon), carnivoraformes Quercygale, adapids (Adapis, Leptadapis, Simonsia, omomyid Necrolemur, notharctid Periconodon, rodents Plesiarctomys and Airulavus, apatemyid Heterohyus, bat Stehlinia, and the metatherian Amphiperatherium.

By MP16, Lophiodon was the last remaining lophiodont genus in western Europe as well as one of two remaining non-palaeothere genera there, the other being Chasmotherium. The three species L. lautricense, L. thomasi, and L. sanmoralense are recorded from and are exclusive to the unit. L. lautricense is noted to have been found in Robiac, which similarly had hot and humid forest environments. The various fossil mammals found from the deposits of Robiac include the herpetotheriids Amphiperatherium and Peratherium, apatemyid Heterohyus, nyctithere Saturninia, omomyids (Necrolemur, Pseudoloris, and Microchoerus), adapid Adapis, ischyromyid Ailuravus, glirid Glamys, pseudosciurid Sciuroides, theridomyids Elfomys and Pseudoltinomys, hyaenodonts (Paracynohyaenodon, Paroxyaena, and Cynohyaenodon), carnivoraformes (Simamphicyon, Quercygale, and Paramiacis), cebochoerids Cebochoerus and Acotherulum, choeropotamids Haplobunodon and Choeropotamus, tapirulid Tapirulus, anoplotheriids Dacrytherium, Catodontherium, and Robiatherium, dichobunid Mouillacitherium, robiacinid Robiacina, xiphodonts (Xiphodon, Dichodon, Haplomeryx), amphimerycid Pseudamphimeryx, hyrachyid Chasmotherium, and palaeotheres (Palaeotherium, Plagiolophus, Leptolophus, Anchilophus, Metanchilophus, Lophiotherium, Pachynolophus, Eurohippus).

== Extinction ==
Although the Lophiodontidae was a dominant large herbivorous mammal group of western Europe, the species diversity that was at its maximum between MP12 to MP14 declined afterward up to MP16. MP16 marked the last appearance of Lophiodon as well as the eventual extinction of lophiodonts afterward. It was not the only large-sized animal from western Europe to have disappeared after MP16, as the Hyrachyidae and Sebecia (all remaining European crocodylomorphs except for the alligatoroid Diplocynodon) became extinct afterward as well. On the other hand, the artiodactyl groups survived intact and became the dominant herbivorous mammal order while palaeotheres were the sole perissodactyl group in western Europe by the late Eocene. This marked a second major faunal turnover in the Eocene of western Europe in which various species had progressively changing dentitions and dietary strategies while several animal groups disappeared.

One possible explanation behind the extinction of Lophiodon is climate change and the shift in vegetation adapted to increased seasonality. Another suggested cause behind the extinction of the lophiodonts is increased faunal competition. As palaeotheres played increasingly roles in faunal structures of western Europe during the Middle Eocene, they might have led lophiodonts to change niches based on their body sizes and dietary habits. As the palaeotheres of the Middle to Late Eocene had dietary habits similar to lophiodonts of the early Eocene, more recent Lophiodon species may have had to adapt to consuming lower quality and more fibrous food material. Ecological competition including for the lophiodonts may have also been broader in scale.
