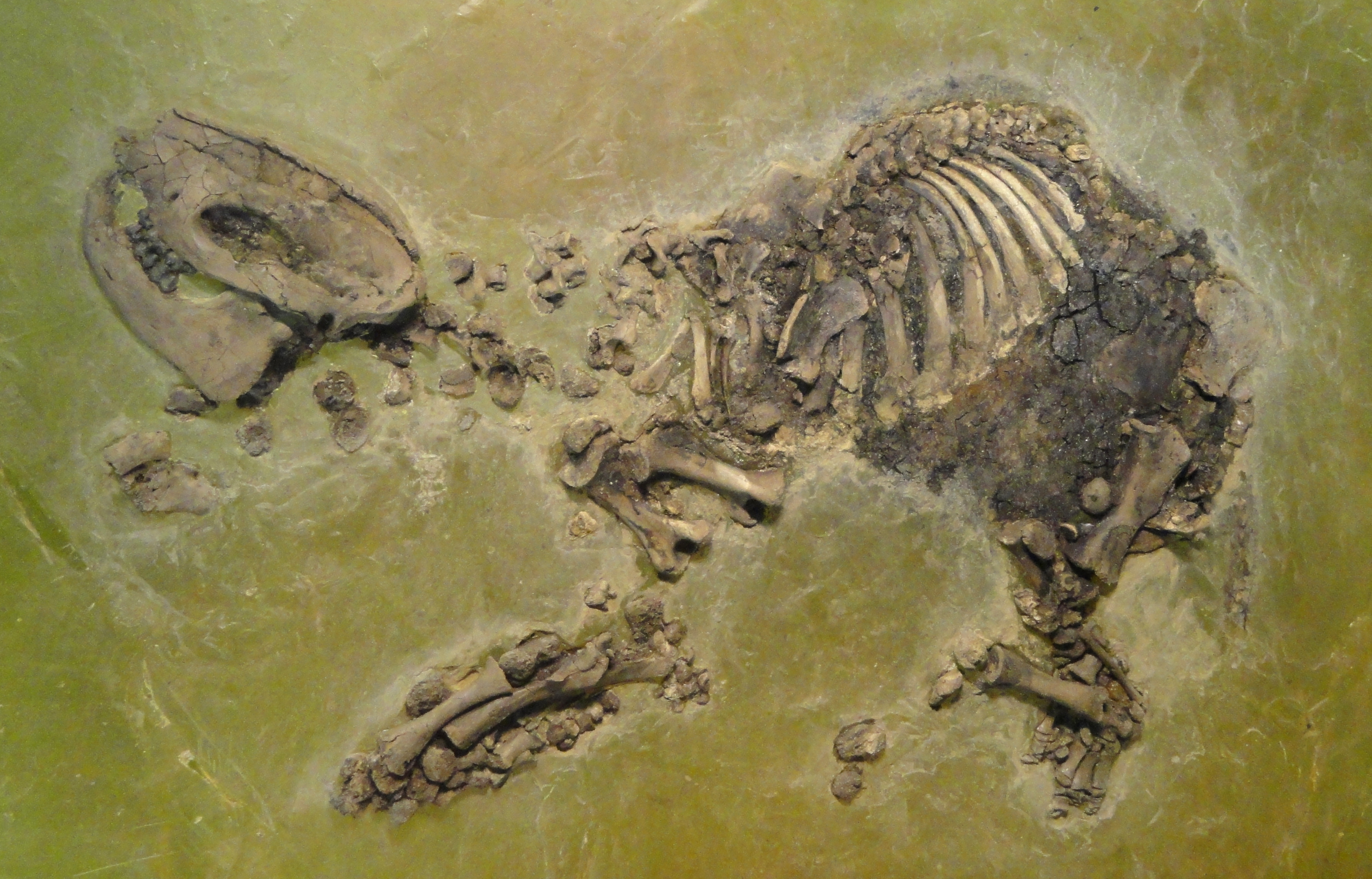
- Skeleton of Lophiodon

Scientific classification
- Kingdom: Animalia
- Phylum: Chordata
- Class: Mammalia
- Order: Perissodactyla
- Suborder: †Ancylopoda
- Family: †Lophiodontidae; Gill, 1872

Genera
- Atalonodon; Chasmotherium; Eolophiodon; Lophiaspis; Lophiodon; Paralophiodon

= Lophiodontidae =

Lophiodontidae Temporal range: Early Eocene–Middle Eocene

Extinct family of mammals

Lophiodontidae is a family of browsing, herbivorous, mammals in the Perissodactyla suborder Ancylopoda. They lived in Southern Europe during the Eocene epoch. Previously thought to be related to tapirs, it is now thought that they were most likely related to early chalicotheres, although they are distinct from that group.
