= Atacisaurus =

Atacisaurus Temporal range: Middle Eocene, Bartonian

Scientific classification
- Domain: Eukaryota
- Kingdom: Animalia
- Phylum: Chordata
- Class: Reptilia
- Clade: Archosauria
- Order: Crocodilia
- Family: Gavialidae
- Genus: †Atacisaurus; Astre, 1931
- Species: †A. glareae

Binomial name
- †Atacisaurus glareae Astre, 1931

Extinct genus of reptiles

Atacisaurus is an extinct dubious genus of gavialoid crocodylian. Fossils have been found in the Grès de Carcassonne Member of the Sables du Castrais Formation in Laure-Minervois, France that date back to the Middle Eocene.

== Discovery and naming ==
The holotype, discovered in 1919 by M. Finestres in Laure-Minervois and previously housed at the Société d'Etudes Scientifiques de l'Aude, is an anterior portion of a mandible which is now lost, and MHNT.PAL.2012.0.49, a partial skull from a different specimen is also known, which was donated to the History Museum of Toulouse in 1873 by Henri de Sévérac; MHNT.PAL.2012.0.49 has since been partially prepared at sometime between 1931 and 17 April 2016.

The type species, A. glareae, was named and described by Gaston Astre in 1931. A snout fragment from the History Museum of Tolouse was also described by Astre (1931), but can not be identified further than cf. Atacisaurus.

A second nominal species of this genus, Atacisaurus crassiproratus, was reclassified as a sebecosuchian in the 1990s, listed as cf. Iberosuchus by Ortega et al. (1996) before being recognized as distinct from Iberosuchus by Martin et al. (2023) and renamed Dentaneosuchus.

== Classification ==
Atacisaurus glareae has been considered synonymous with Pristichampsus rollinatii, Tomistoma, Crocodylus intermedius and Kentisuchus spenceri.

Although currently classified within Gavialidae, Atacisaurus has been suggested to have tentatively belonged within Tomistominae due to its resemblance to Megadontosuchus.
