= Atalonodon =

Atalonodon Temporal range: Lutetian

Scientific classification
- Kingdom: Animalia
- Phylum: Chordata
- Class: Mammalia
- Order: Perissodactyla
- Family: †Lophiodontidae
- Genus: †Atalonodon; Dal-Piaz, 1929

Extinct genus of mammals

Atalonodon is an extinct genus of lophiodontid from the middle Eocene (Lutetian) on the island of Sardinia.
