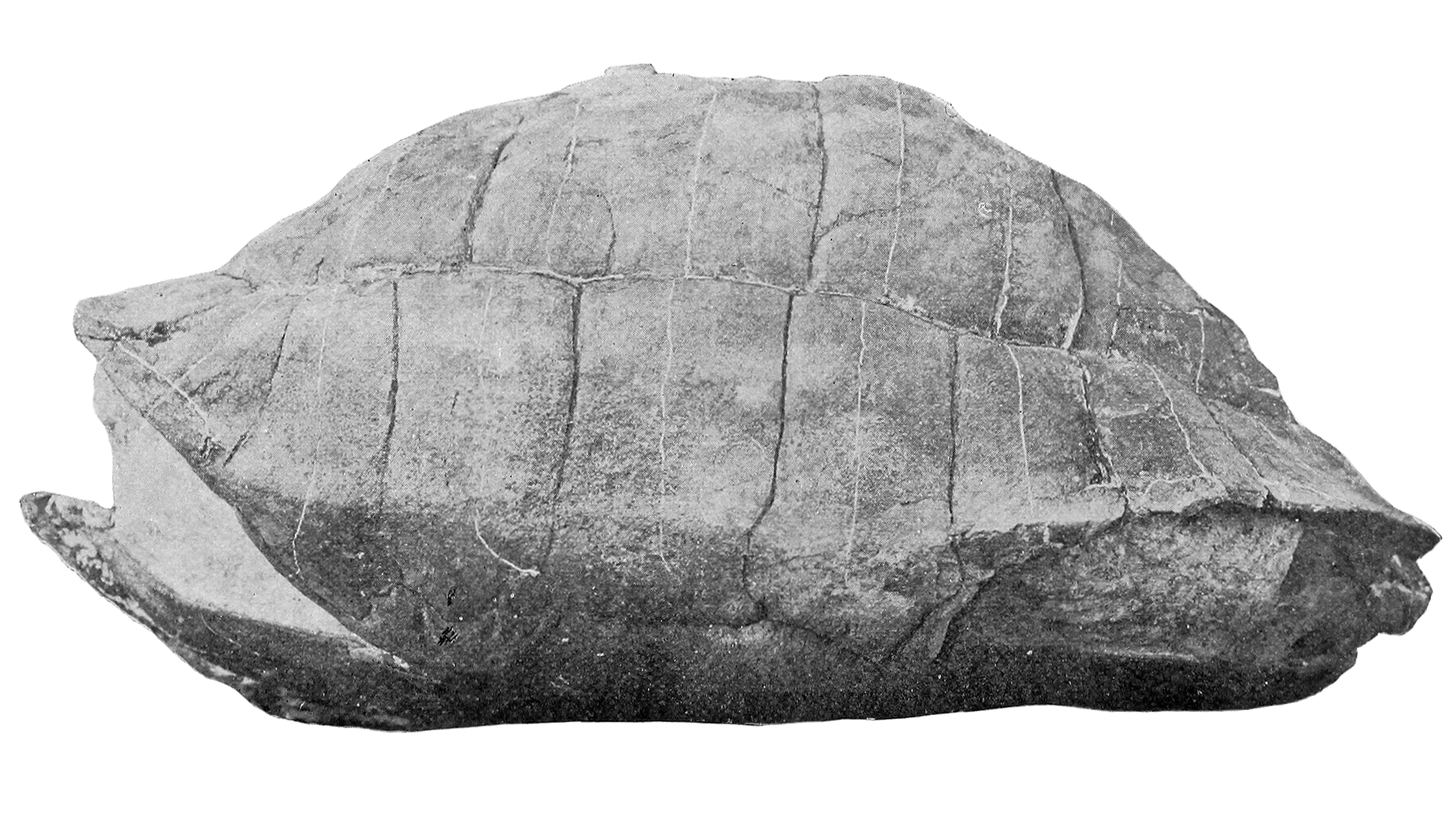
- Hadrianus majusculus

Scientific classification
- Kingdom: Animalia
- Phylum: Chordata
- Class: Reptilia
- Order: Testudines
- Suborder: Cryptodira
- Clade: Pantestudinoidea
- Superfamily: Testudinoidea
- (unranked): †Pantestudinidae
- Genus: †Hadrianus; Cope, 1872

Species
- H. corsoni; H. majusculus

= Hadrianus (turtle) =

Hadrianus Temporal range: 55.4–33.9 Ma Eocene

Extinct genus of tortoise

Hadrianus is an extinct genus of tortoise belonging to the Testudinidae found in the United States, the Yolomécatl Formation of Mexico, the Alai Beds of Kyrgyzstan and Spain and believed to be the oldest true tortoise known. The genus is thought to be closely related to the genus Manouria. The genus may have evolved in the subtropics of Asia and subsequently migrated to North America and Europe. Evangelos Vlachos (2018) reassessed the North American species attributed to the genus, and determined only two as accepted namely H. corsoni & H. majusculus. The remaining species were identified as either junior synonyms, moved to other genera or considered nomen dubium due to incomplete fossils.

== Taxonomy ==
The species 'Testudo' sharanensis is hypothesized to actually be a species of Hadrianus.

- Hadrianus corsoni (Leidy, 1871)
  - Synonyms Emys carteri Leidy, 1871; Testudo hadriana Cope, 1871; Hadrianus quadratus Cope, 1871; Hadrianus octonaria Cope, 1871; Hadrianus tumidus Hay 1908; Hadrianus robustus Gilmore, 1915; Hadrianus utahensis Gilmore, 1915; Geochelone gilmorei Auffenberg, 1974
- Hadrianus majusculus Hay, 1904

=== Nomen dubium ===
- "Hadrianus allabiatus" Cope, 1871

=== Moved species ===
- "Hadrianus schucherti" Hay, 1899 moved to Cymatholcus schucherti (Hay, 1899)
