= Lophiaspis =

Lophiaspis Temporal range: Ypresian
- Life reconstruction of L. maurettei

Scientific classification
- Kingdom: Animalia
- Phylum: Chordata
- Class: Mammalia
- Order: Perissodactyla
- Family: †Lophiodontidae
- Genus: †Lophiaspis; Depéret, 1910

Type species
- †Lophiaspis maurettei Depéret, 1910

Other species
- †Lophiaspis baicherei Depéret, 1910; †Lophiaspis occitanicus (Cuvier, 1812)

Synonyms
- Synonyms of L. occitanicus: Palaeotherium occitanicum Cuvier, 1812

Extinct genus of mammals

Lophiaspis is an extinct genus of early perissodactyl endemic to Southern Europe during the Early to Middle Eocene, living from 55.8 to 37.2 Ma. Remains have been found from France, Spain, and Portugal.

== Discovery and naming ==
Fossilised remains of Lophiaspis were first discovered in 1898, when French geologist Gaston-Casimir Vasseur found several jaw fragments of this animal on the bank of the Arc River near Palette, Aix-en-Provence, France. Though Vasseur deposited these specimens in Aix-Marseille University, he did not publish any information about them. Lophiaspis fossils would only be first reported in 1907 by French paleontologist Charles Depéret, whose assistant Laurent Maurette directed an excavation at the same site where Vasseur first discovered the jaw fragments. The excavation led to the discovery of more fossils, which Depéret realised represents a genus unknown to science at the time. In addition, he recognised that the jaw fragments found by Vasseur were from the same type of animal.

In 1910, Depéret published a study in which he named this genus Lophiaspis, and assigned three species to it. The species represented by the aforementioned fossils was named Lophiaspis maurettei, after Depéret's assistant, and it is the type species of its genus. Its holotype specimen is a fragmentary palate kept in Claude Bernard University Lyon 1 under the specimen number FSL 2084. Depéret also assigned two other species to Lophiaspis; French naturalist Edmond Baichère sent him a row of fossilised molar teeth found in Bagnoles, which Depéret designated as the holotype of a new species he named Lophiaspis baicherei in honour of Baichère. The third species was originally described by French paleontologist Georges Cuvier in 1812 as a species of Palaeotherium under the name Palaeotherium occitanicum. After studying several jaw elements of this animal collected from the French sites of Conques, Issel and Montpellier, Depéret decided to reclassify it as a species of Lophiaspis, changing its name to Lophiaspis occitanicus.

== Palaeobiology ==
=== Palaeoecology ===
Lophiaspis maurettei was a folivore, as indicated by its dental microwear textures.
