= Issel, Aude =

Commune in Occitanie, France

Issel
- Commune
- Coat of arms
- Location of Issel
- Location within France Location within Occitanie
- Coordinates: 43°22′05″N 1°59′26″E
- Country: France
- Region: Occitania
- Department: Aude
- Arrondissement: Carcassonne
- Canton: Le Bassin chaurien

Government
  - Mayor (2020–2026): Henri Poisson
- Area^{1}: 17.66 km^{2} (6.82 sq mi)
- Elevation: 180 m (590 ft)
- Highest elevation: 340 m (1,120 ft)
- Lowest elevation: 160 m (520 ft)
- Population (2023): 483
  - Density: 27.3/km^{2} (70.8/sq mi)
- Time zone: UTC+01:00 (CET)
  - Summer (DST): UTC+02:00 (CEST)
- INSEE/Postal code: 11175 /11400
- ^{1} French Land Register data, which excludes lakes, ponds, glaciers > 1 km^{2} (0.386 sq mi or 247 acres) and river estuaries.

Issel (French pronunciation: [isɛl]; Occitan: Issèl) is a commune in the Aude department in southern France.

The village is laid out in the form of a circulade. It is positioned on the edge of an area of wooded hills, some 5 km (3.1 mi) north of Castelnaudary.

== Population ==
Historical population
| Year | Pop. | ±% p.a. |
|---|---|---|
| 1968 | 268 | — |
| 1975 | 248 | −1.10% |
| 1982 | 310 | +3.24% |
| 1990 | 363 | +1.99% |
| 1999 | 395 | +0.94% |
| 2007 | 456 | +1.81% |
| 2012 | 484 | +1.20% |
| 2017 | 488 | +0.16% |
| 2023 | 483 | −0.17% |
Source: INSEE

== See also ==
- Communes of the Aude department
