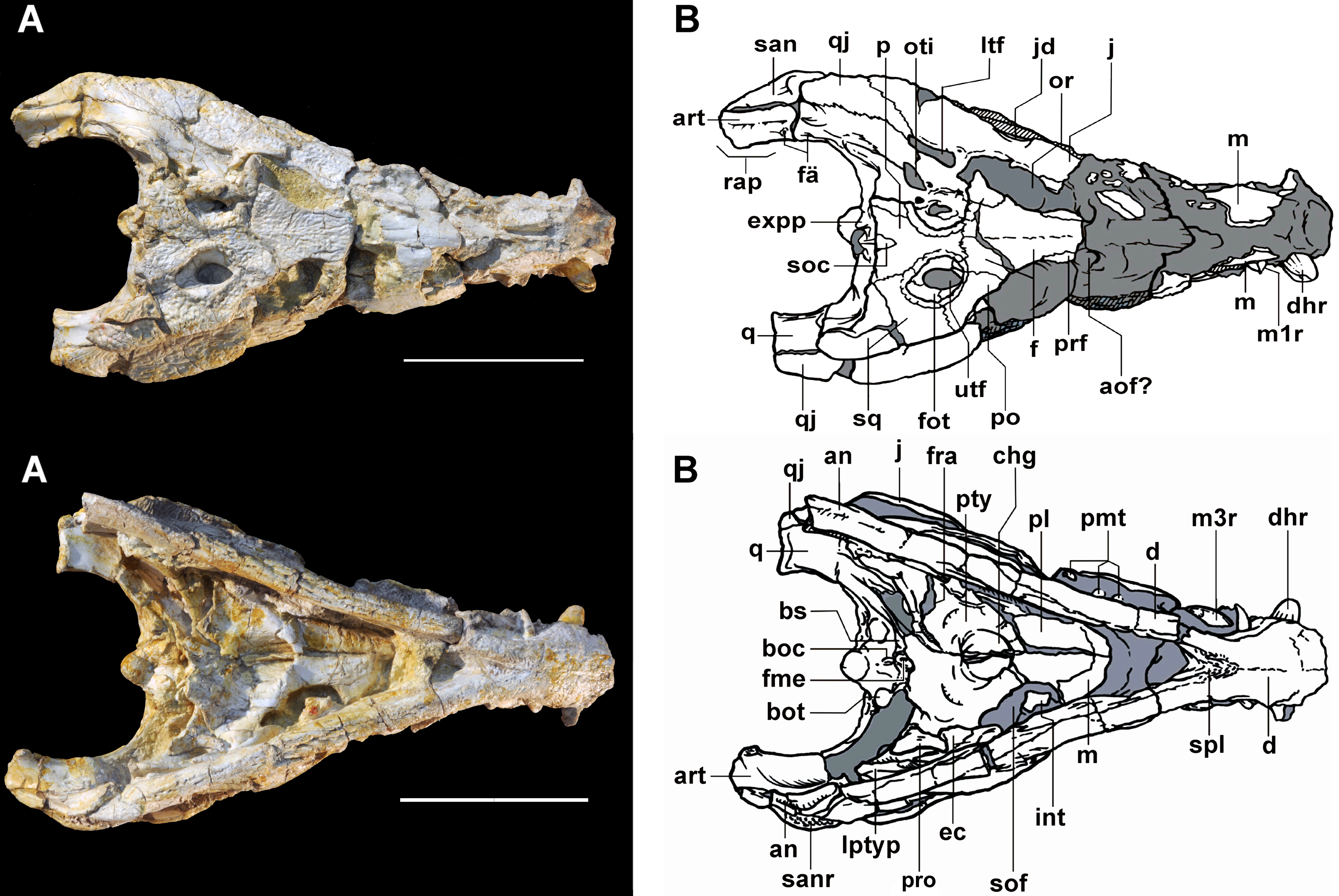
- Holotype skull in dorsal and ventral view

Scientific classification
- Kingdom: Animalia
- Phylum: Chordata
- Class: Reptilia
- Clade: Pseudosuchia
- Clade: Crocodylomorpha
- Clade: †Notosuchia
- Family: †Sebecidae
- Genus: †Sahitisuchus; Kellner et al. 2014

Type species
- †Sahitisuchus fluminensis Kellner et al. 2014

= Sahitisuchus =

Sahitisuchus Temporal range: Early Eocene (Itaboraian) ~53–50 Ma

Extinct genus of reptiles

Sahitisuchus is an extinct genus of sebecid mesoeucrocodylian known from Rio de Janeiro State of southeastern Brazil. It contains a single species, Sahitisuchus fluminensis. It is a terrestrial sebecid, although it may also have adopted a semi-aquatic lifestyle to some degree, most probably coexisting with the semi-aquatic alligatorid Eocaiman itaboraiensis.

== Discovery ==
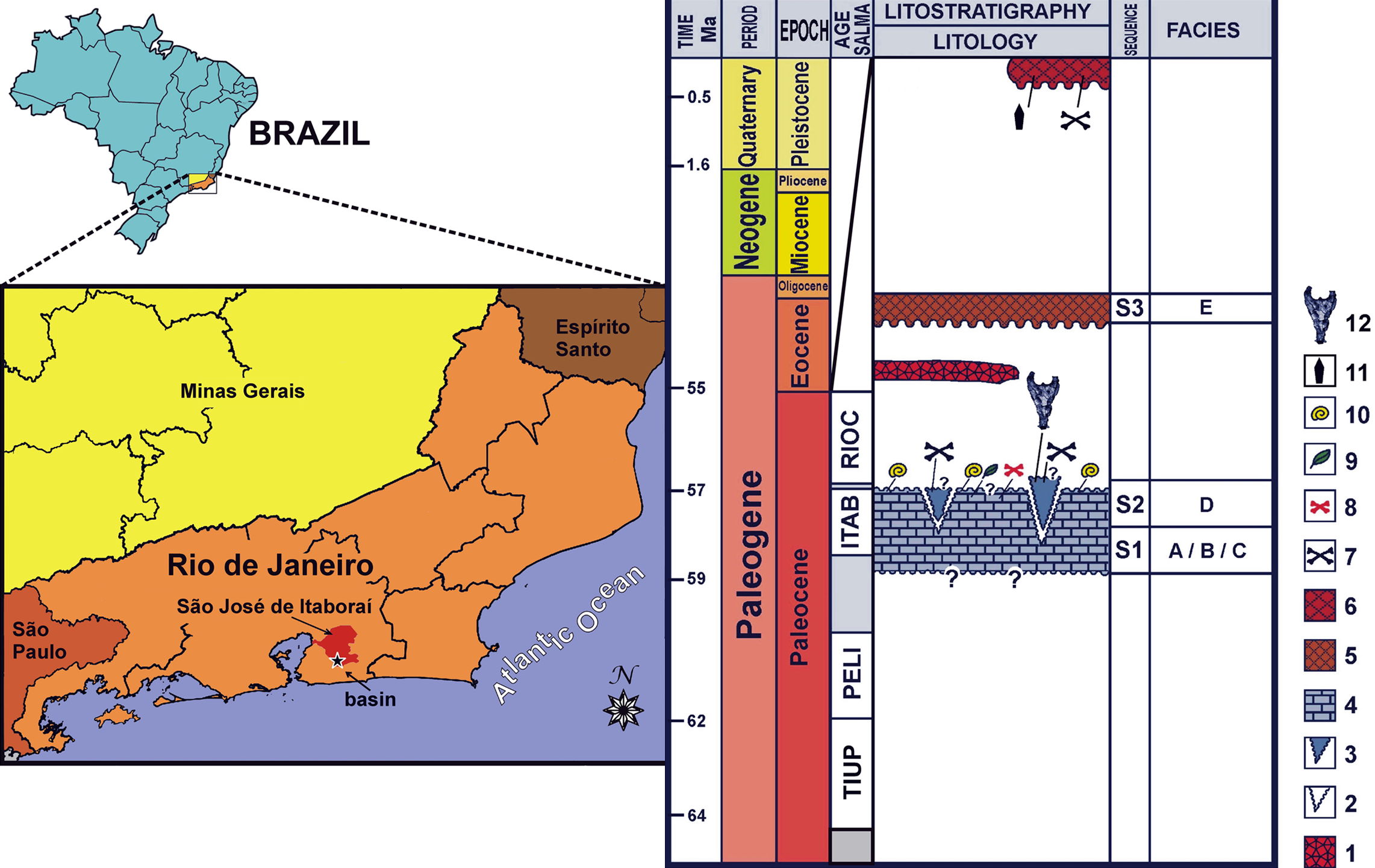
Location and lithochronoestratigraphic column of the Itaboraí Basin

Sahitisuchus was named by Alexander W. A. Kellner, André E. P. Pinheiro and Diogenes A. Campos in 2014 and the type species is Sahitisuchus fluminensis. The generic name honors the Xavante people, one of the indigenous Brazilian inhabitants. It is derived from sahi ti, meaning "to be angry" or "to be brave" in Xavante language, alluding at warriors, and suchus, Latinized from the Greek souchos, an Egyptian crocodile god. The specific name, fluminensis, is a latinization of fluminense, a designation of citizens born in the Rio de Janeiro State.

Sahitisuchus is known solely from the holotype MCT 1730-R, a nearly complete skull and lower jaw, proatlas, an intercentrum, the axis and the third cervical vertebra, housed at the Museu de Ciências da Terra, Companhia de Pesquisas de Recursos Minerais, in Rio de Janeiro, Brazil. A cast of the holotype, MN 4711-V, is housed at the National Museum of Brazil. MCT 1730-R was discovered during the exploration of the São José de Itaboraí Basin, located in Rio de Janeiro State, that lasted for about five decades and ended in 1984. It was collected from São José Farm, of São José de Itaboraí Municipal District, in the S2 sequence of the Itaboraí Formation in the Itaboraí Basin, dating to the late Itaboraian South American land mammals age of the Early Eocene, about 53-50 million years ago. MCT 1730-R was briefly mentioned in the literature by Price and Paula-Couto (1946) and later in 1991 and 1993, but had never been figured or described before Kellner et al. (2014) assigned it to a new genus and species.

Apart from Sahitisuchus fluminensis, Eocaiman itaboraiensis is the only other species formally described based on remains collected at São José de Itaboraí Basin. To date, this is the only Paleocene deposit where the crocodyliform fauna was composed by rather primitive (Sahitisuchus, a sebecosuchian) and more derived (Alligatoridae) post-K-Pg taxa. Sahitisuchus and E. itaboraiensis were either set apart for a comparatively short geological timespan or, most likely, co-occurred.

== Description ==
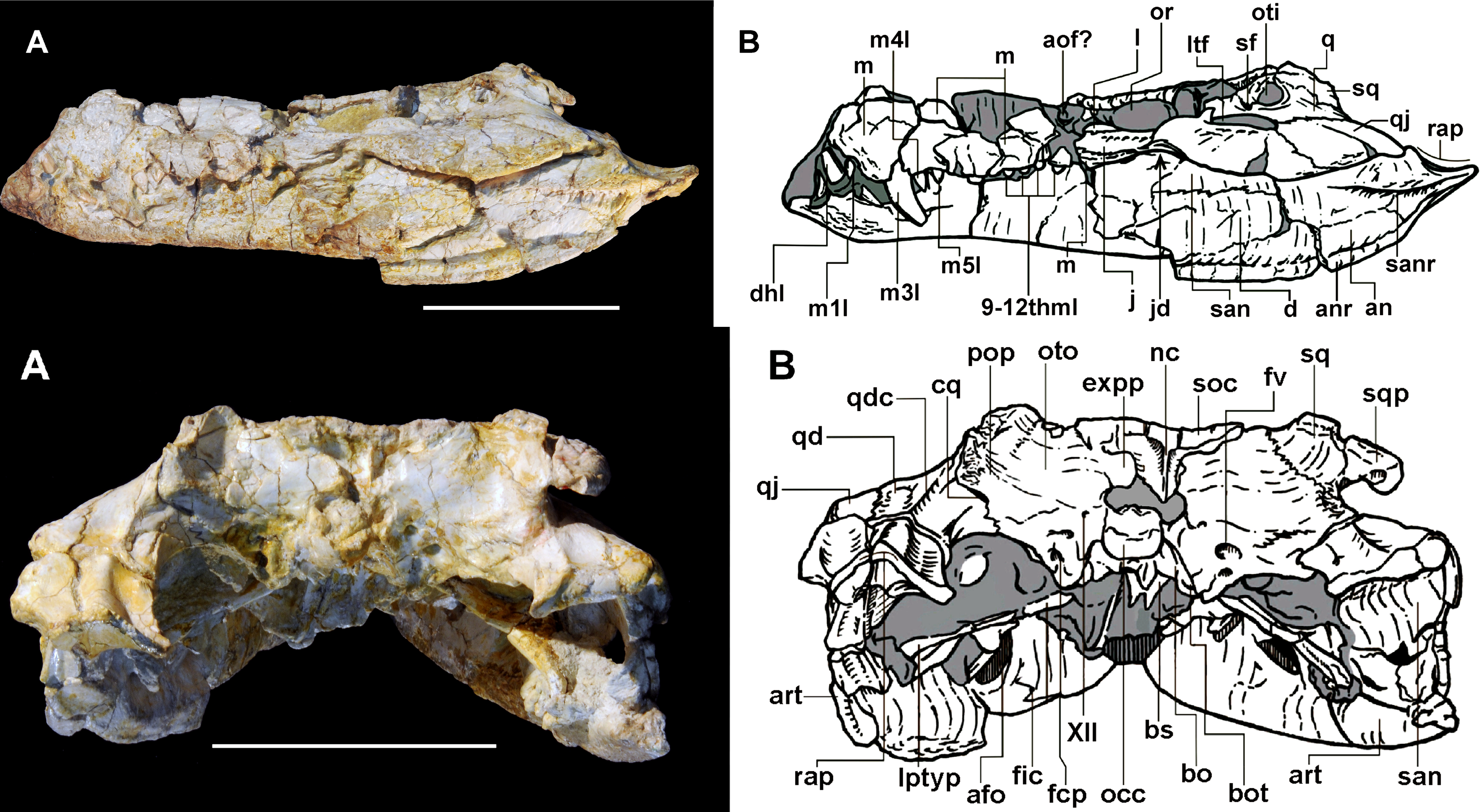
Skull in left lateral and occipital view

The holotype of Sahitisuchus is well preserved, although during preservation the skull became slightly compressed dorsoventrally. This effect is mainly observable on some elements of the rear portion of the skull, particularly the supraoccipital that is displaced towards the foramen magnum. The tip of the snout and the premaxillae are broken off. Sahitisuchus possesses the two following autapomorphies among sebecids: the odontoid process is fused to the axis with vertical anterior surface, lacking medial processes, and its mandible lacks an external mandibular fenestra. Sahitisuchus can be also distinguished from other sebecids by a combination of characters. As in Lorosuchus, there is a shallow ventrolateral depression in its infraorbital jugal region. A shallow elliptical depression is present near the cranio-mandibular articulation on the posterior surface of the quadrate, and the dorsal edge of supratemporal fossa is rough and rugose, as seen in Sebecus. The exoccipital posterior processes are sharp, half moon-shaped and directed medially, as in Ayllusuchus. The jugal in Sahitisuchus is very large and ornamented, and as previously observed only in Bretesuchus, its rear ramus is higher than the anterior process and expands laterally. As in Bretesuchus and Sebecus, it has a rough longitudinal ridge on the lateroventral edge of angular bone and dentary, that ends near the mandibular symphysis level.

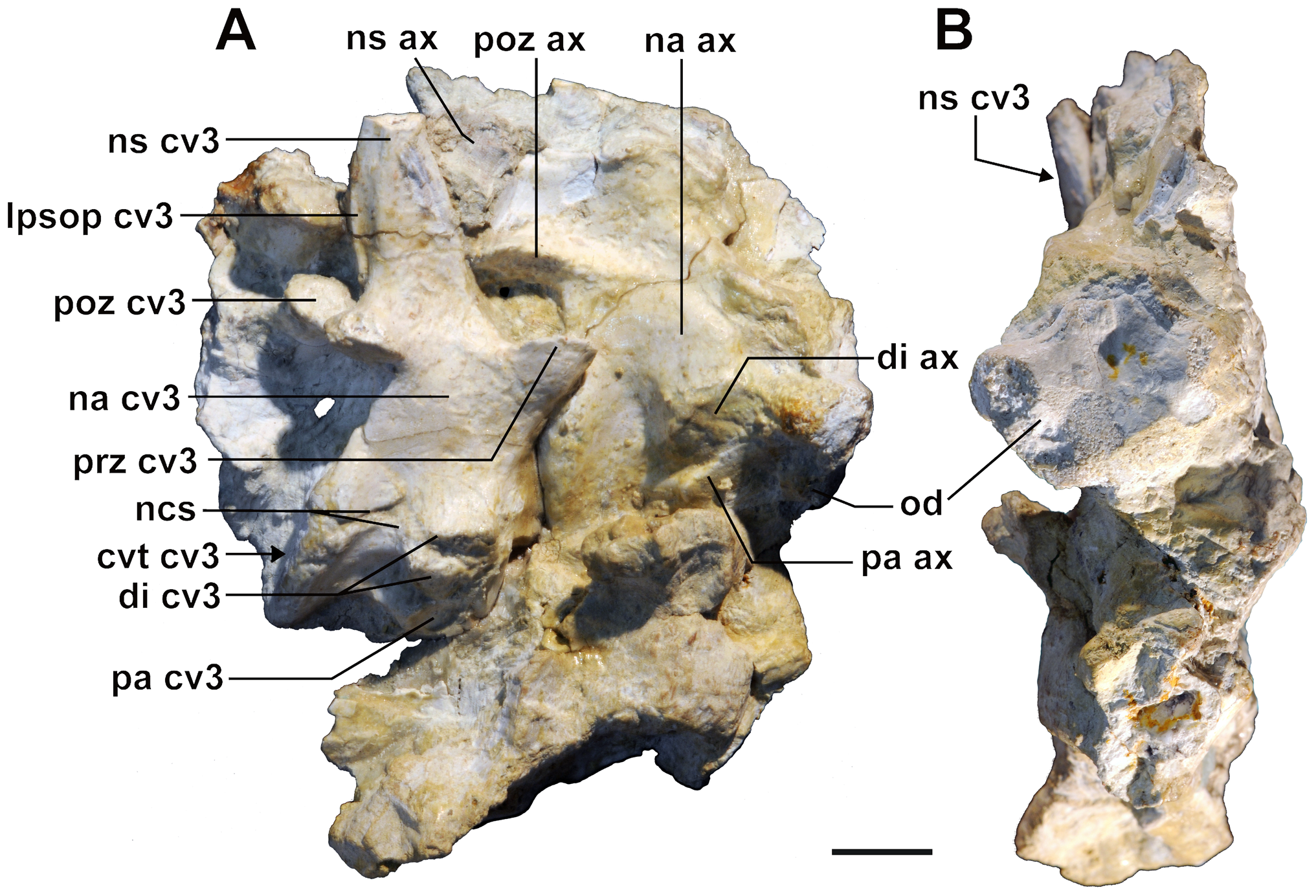
Cervical vertebra

The frontal bone is broad and triangular and ornamented similarly to the maxilla. As in many basal mesoeucrocodylian taxa, which includes some sebecosuchians like Lorosuchus, Sebecus, Zulmasuchus, Iberosuchus and Pepesuchus, a longitudinal frontal crest is present. In Sahitisuchus, it is low and smooth, running from the middle part to the posterior portion the frontal. As in all sebecid species and some other not closely related taxa, the quadratojugal forms a "double articulation" by participating in the cranio-mandibular articulation. As in the peirosaurids Hamadasuchus and Lomasuchus, Sahitisuchus possesses a squamosal prong which is directed backwards and does not form a horn. Such sculptured dorsal posteriorly pointed lobe is also present in Sebecus, but with a more squared-shape rear end. The portion of the tympanic cavity formed by the quadrate is not multi-fenestrated like in protosuchians, notosuchians and baurusuchids, and lacks the characteristic oblong concavity of baurusuchids. In Sahitisuchus it shows only two openings, as seen in Sebecus, Hamadasuchus and recent species. As in Sebecus, the only other sebecid known from this part of the skeleton, the diapophysis is divided by the neurocentral suture and in lateral view, the centrum shows a medial constriction and a trapezoidal shape, with anterior and posterior articulations inclined anteriorly. In comparison to Sebecus, Sahitisuchus has more robust and broader diapophyses, and the length of the third cervical centrum is nearly equal compared to the axis.

=== Skull ===
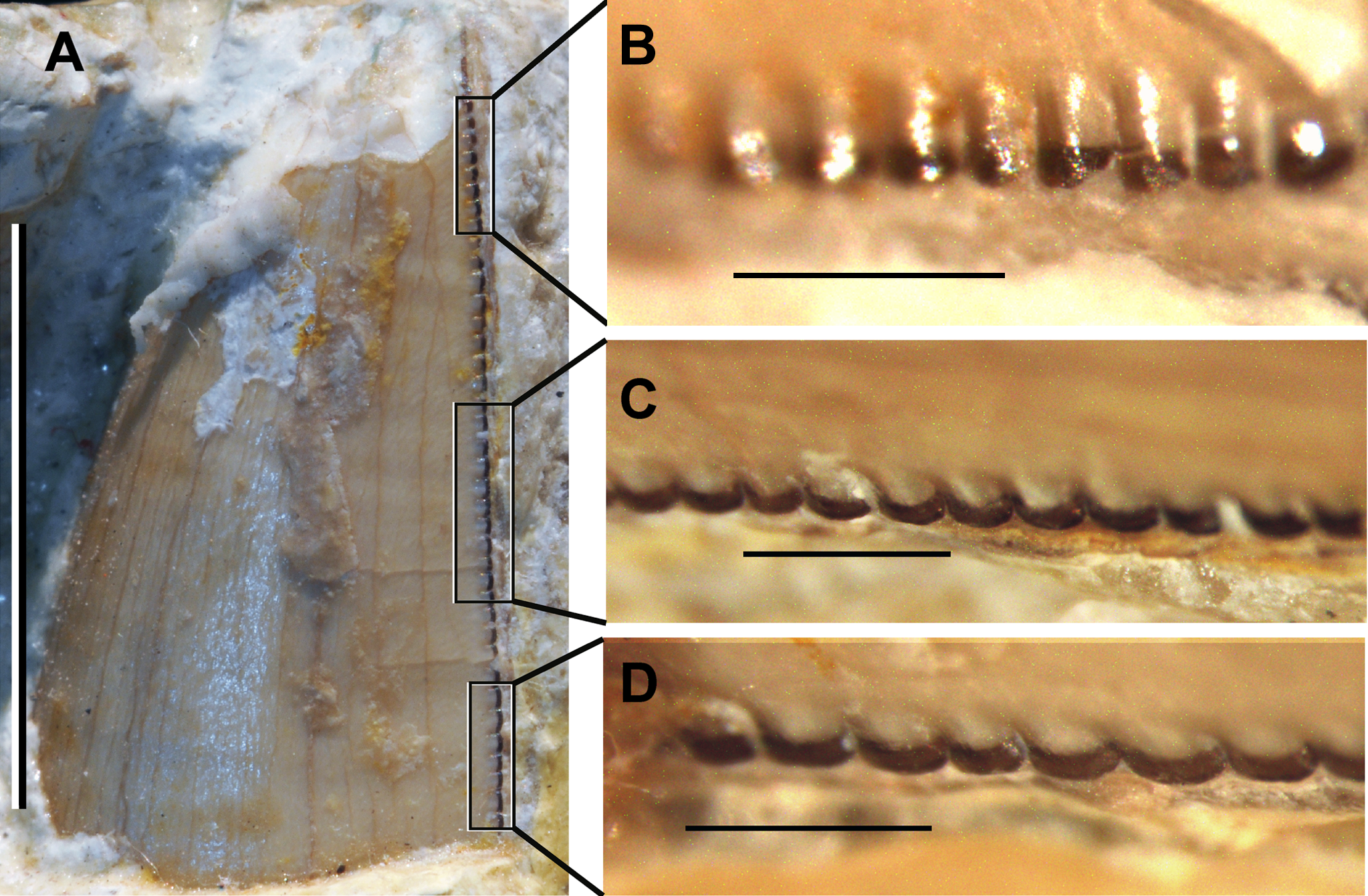
Fourth mandibular tooth in several views

The skull of Sahitisuchus is elongated in dorsal view, showing two slight constrictions at about the level of the fifth and eleventh maxillary alveoli, being comparatively shorter than the skull of Sebecus and Stolokrosuchus, but not as short as Lorosuchus. The snout of Sahitisuchus is not as tall and domed (oreinirostral) as seen in Sebecus, Barinasuchus, Bretesuchus, Zulmasuchus and Langstonia. The skull roof of Sahitisuchus is flat and rectangular, being wider than long. The supratemporal fossa is much larger than the supratemporal fenestra and is about three times smaller than the orbits. The dorsal border of this fossa is surrounded by rugosities, forming an elevation that is more developed in the medial and lateral borders, a condition that is similar only to Sebecus and the peirosaurid Hamadasuchus among mesoeucrocodylians. The eye socket is placed rather laterally, as in terrestrial sebecids, and not laterodorsally as in semi-aquatic crocodyliforms, like Stolokrosuchus, Lorosuchus and extant species of Crocodilia. Sahitisuchus possesses 12 maxillary teeth, similarly to 10 maxillary teeth in other Paleogene sebecosuchians (Lorosuchus, Bretesuchus and Zulmasuchus), as well as blunt posterior teeth, unlike Cretaceous sebecosuchians. Cretaceous sebecosuchians, like Baurusuchus and Stratiotosuchus showing only five maxillary teeth, and more recent sebecosuchians (e.g. the Eocene Sebecus exhibiting nine maxillary teeth, and the Upper Miocene Langstonia), show higher skulls and a specialized, and quite reduced, dentition suggesting that only the less specialized crocodyliforms survived the Cretaceous–Paleogene extinction event (except for the marine dyrosaurids).

== Classification ==
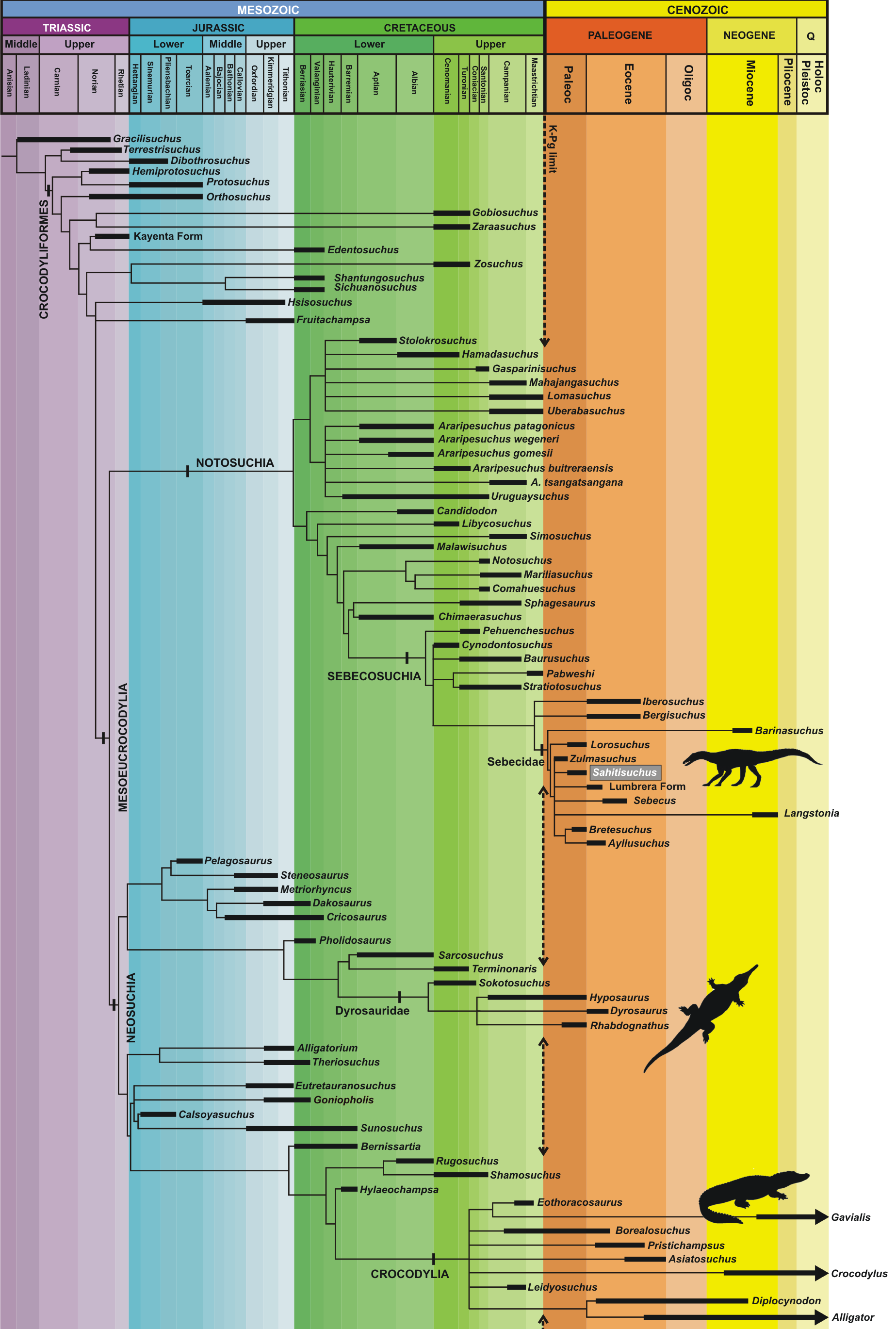
Biochronology of the Crocodylomorpha, including Sahitisuchus

Below is a cladogram from Kellner et al. (2014) showing the placement of Sahitisuchus within Sebecosuchia.

- - - Chimaerasuchus
    - Sphagesaurus
  - Sebecosuchia
    - Pehuenchesuchus
    - - Baurusuchidae
        - - Pabwehshi
          - Stratiotosuchus
        - Baurusuchus
      - - Cynodontosuchus
        - - - Bergisuchus
            - Iberosuchus
          - Sebecidae
            - Barinasuchus
            - - Lorosuchus
              - - - Ayllusuchus
                  - Bretesuchus
                - Lumbrera form
                - Langstonia
                - Sahitisuchus
                - Sebecus
                - Zulmasuchus
