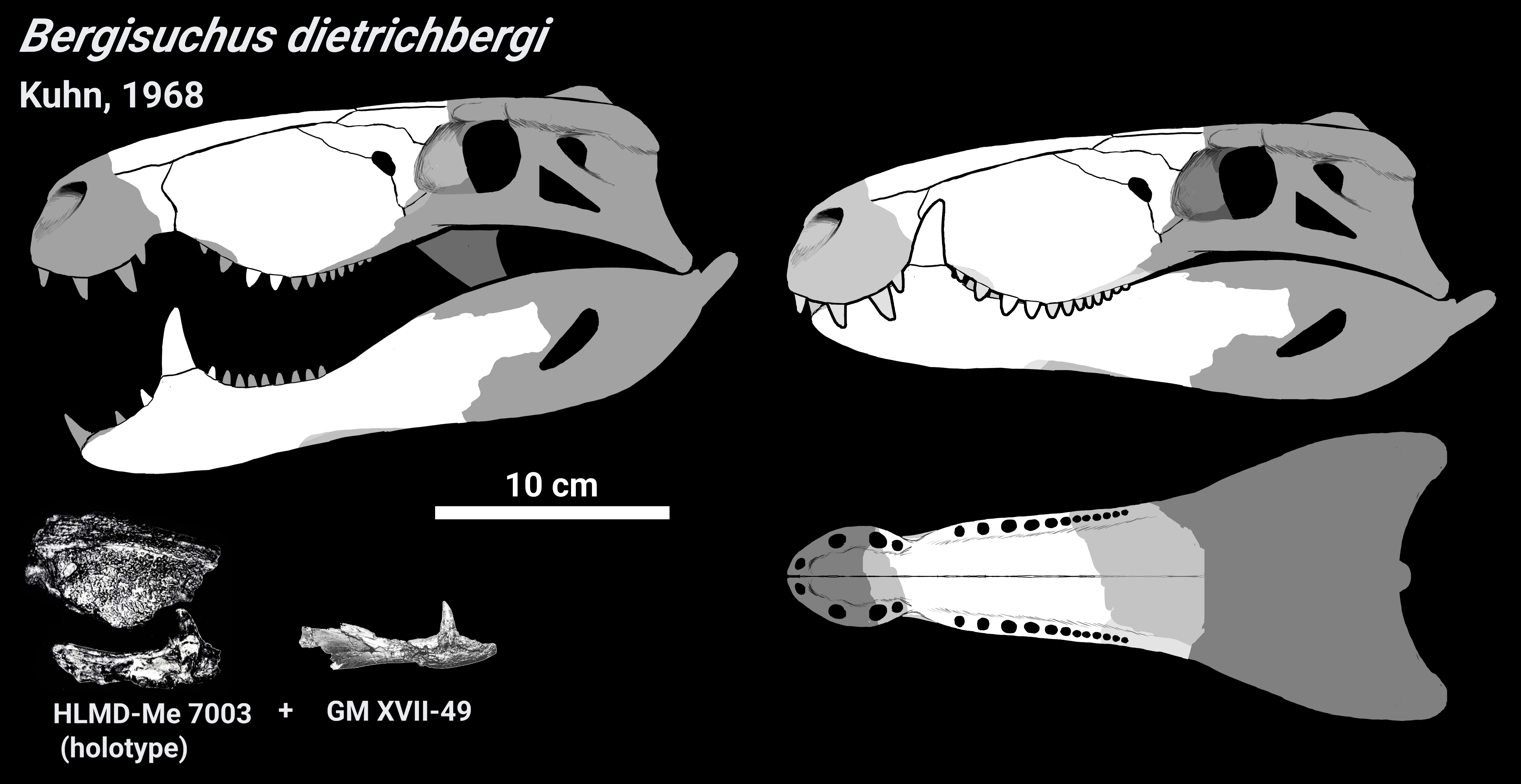
- Skull diagram showcasing what is preserved of both specimens
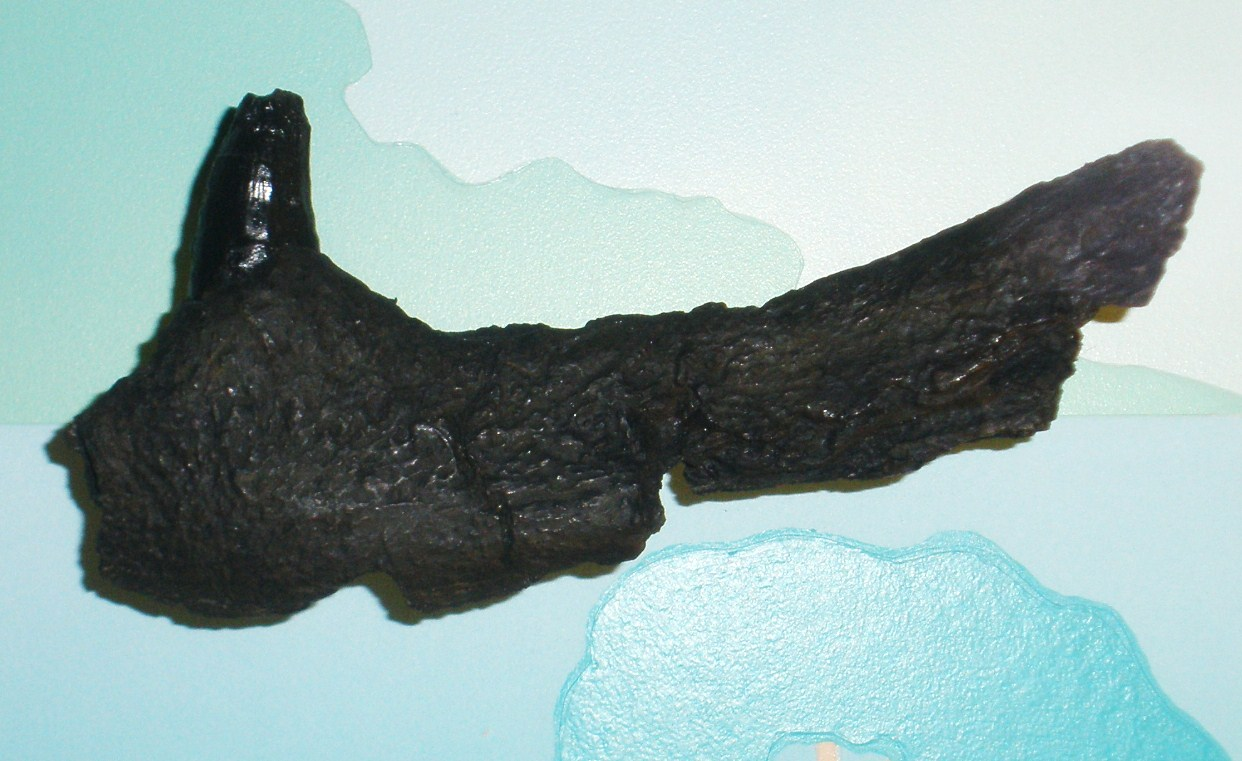
- Bergisuchus dietrichbergi holotype mandible, HLMD-Me 7003.

Scientific classification
- Kingdom: Animalia
- Phylum: Chordata
- Class: Reptilia
- Clade: Pseudosuchia
- Clade: Crocodylomorpha
- Clade: †Notosuchia
- Family: †Bergisuchidae; Rossmann, Rauhe & Ortega 2000
- Genus: †Bergisuchus; Kuhn, 1968
- Species: †B. dietrichbergi

Binomial name
- †Bergisuchus dietrichbergi Kuhn, 1968

= Bergisuchus =

Bergisuchus Temporal range: Middle Eocene Early to Middle Lutetian

Extinct genus of reptiles

Bergisuchus is an extinct genus of small sebecosuchian mesoeucrocodylian known primarily from the Eocene Messel Pit in Germany. Few fossils of Bergisuchus have been discovered, only a single incomplete snout, a few partial lower jaws and some teeth. Despite being fragmentary, the jaw bones are enough to indicate that Bergisuchus had a short, deep, narrow snout and serrated teeth, quite unlike the broad flat snouts of modern crocodylians.

As with other sebecosuchians, it is likely that Bergisuchus was a fast, terrestrial predator and not an aquatic ambush hunter like modern crocodylians. Its presence in Europe is also unusual, as later sebecosuchians were restricted entirely to South America, and so Bergisuchus indicates the group was once much more widespread in the early Cenozoic.

== History of Discovery ==
Bergisuchus was first discovered by Dr. Dietrich Berg from the German Messel Pit in 1966, who originally classified it as an unnamed new species of sebecosuchian with close affinities to Sebecus, notable for being the first sebecosuchian remains to be recognised outside South America. It was named and described two years later in 1968 by German palaeontologist Oskar Kuhn, who named the binomial Bergisuchus dietrichbergi in honour of Dr. Berg and combined it with the Greek suffix suchos for "crocodile". Bergisuchus is known from the holotype snout and lower jaw (HLMD-Me 7003) from the Messel Pit near Darmstadt first reported in 1966, dated to the Mammal Paleogene zone (MP) 11, and an additional incomplete pair of mandibles (GM XVIII-49) from the Geiseltal open-pit coal mine near Halle in the state of Saxony-Anhalt from the slightly younger MP 12. The holotype is stored in the Hessisches Landesmuseum Darmstadt, while the paratype is housed in the Geiseltal Collection of the Center for Natural Science Collections at the Martin Luther University of Halle-Wittenberg, in Germany.

In 2015, osteoderms from karst deposits dated to the Middle Eocene in Lissieu, France, were tentatively suggested to belong to Bergisuchus sp., or alternatively to Iberosuchus sp. (another European sebecosuchian). This referral was based on the similarity between the osteoderms and those of Baurusuchus and other sebecosuchians, as the two genera are the only known European sebecosuchians.

== Description ==
Bergisuchus is only represented by the holotype snout and lower jaw (HLMD-Me 7003) and the referred pair of lower jaws (GM XVIII-49), so much of its anatomy is unknown. The snout is tall and laterally compressed, unlike the broad flat snouts of modern crocodylians, with tall nasals that form a raised, sharp midline along the length of the snout. Rossmann and colleagues reconstructed the incomplete premaxillae as tall and steep based on the dimensions of the maxilla, more similar in shape to those of Baurusuchus, Barinasuchus and Bretesuchus than to Sebecus. The premaxilla may also have sloped downwards, similar to that of Bretesuchus. Overall, the snout is relatively short and deep compared to the long, low skull of Sebecus. A deep notch is present between the maxilla and premaxilla to house the large lower canine tooth, along with a prominent bulge of bone above each. Based on the shape of the known snout, it's likely that Bergisuchus had separate nostril openings that faced laterally on the surface, as well as laterally facing eyes, unlike modern crocodylians. Also, it shares with Iberosuchus the unusual presence of a small antorbital fenestra, a feature that's invariably absent in both baurusuchids and sebecids. The surface of the maxilla is profusely sculpted with ridges and grooves, a feature that clearly distinguishes it from Iberosuchus.

The lower jaws are mostly only known from incomplete dentaries (as well as part of the splenial), and their surfaces are as similarly strongly sculpted as the upper jaws. The teeth are relatively narrow and serrated (ziphodont), similar to those of predatory theropod dinosaurs and unlike the conical teeth of modern crocodylians. Few teeth themselves are preserved, but they include a very large and prominent serrated 'pseudocanine' that fits into the notch of the upper jaw. This canine is approximately 2 cm tall, and sits on a prominently raised portion of the jaw bone, which arches down in front and behind it and so the rest of the jaw is quite shallow. The rest of the teeth are mostly missing, but the size and shape of the remaining alveoli indicate the size and position of the other teeth in the jaws. The other teeth are around 3 times smaller in diameter than the canines, a unique characteristic of this genus, and are closely packed behind the canine in the lower jaw. Three small teeth are present in front of the canine, the first of which is larger and procumbent, facing up and forwards at the front of the jaw. The maxillary teeth are similarly small, the largest being the third tooth, and the rest of which getting progressively smaller behind it. Premaxillary teeth are unknown, but it possibly had another pair of larger 'pseudocanines' in the upper jaw. It is estimated that there were only 13 teeth in each lower jaw, and at least 13—14 in the upper jaw, a relatively small number compared to other sebecosuchians like Iberosuchus. The teeth are not as strongly compressed as other ziphodont crocodilians, and so may have been stronger and more resistant to stress.

Rossmann and colleagues estimated the total body length of Bergisuchus to be around 1.5 metres (4.9 ft) based on other short-snouted, partially terrestrial crocodylians including Allognathosuchus and the extant dwarf caimans Paleosuchus. Despite its small size, they believed both specimens to represent mature adults, based on both the degree of fusion between the sutures in the skull and the extent of the dermal sculpting on the surface of the bones. As a sebecosuchian, Bergisuchus likely had long limbs that were positioned directly under its body and moved with a parasagittal gait, unlike the sprawling limbs of modern crocodylians. It is unknown if it had a reduced covering of osteoderms like some other sebecosuchians, but no osteoderms were found associated with either individual (although isolated osteoderms have been tentatively referred to this genus).

== Classification ==
Bergisuchus was identified as a sebecosuchian by Dr. Berg when it was first discovered, closely allied to the South American genus Sebecus as "aff. Sebecus? n. sp.". It was later variously assigned to the family Baurusuchidae by Steel in 1973, and also in the now defunct family Trematochampsidae by Buffetaut in 1988. At the time it was unclear what diagnostic traits where unique to each group and which were shared between them, and so the fragmentary Bergisuchus could not be confidently identified and was sometimes placed in incertae sedis for this reason. In 2000, the sebecosuchian affinities of Bergisuchus, particularly to Sebecus, were established by Rossmann and colleagues in a thorough re-examination of the material, and it was assigned to its own monotypic family, the Bergisuchidae, as it was considered too distinct from Sebecus to belong to the same family.

The position of Bergisuchus as a close relative of Sebecus has since been supported by a number of phylogenetic analyses of Mesozoic and Cenozoic mesoeucrocodylians, although the interrelationships of Bergisuchus, Sebecidae and other clades are not settled. The cladograms below are simplified from two recent phylogenetic analyses of mesoeucrocodylians, that of Pol et al. (2014) and of Piacentini Pinheiro et al. (2018), displaying the alternative arrangements of Sebecidae in either Sebecosuchia and Sebecia. (Note: Sebecosuchia is cladistically defined as the node containing Sebecidae and Baurusuchidae, assuming a close relationship between the two. Sebecia is a similar concept but for the node containing Sebecidae and Peirosauridae. The validity of each clade depends on the position of Sebecidae within Mesoeucrocodylia, often involving its relationship to Notosuchia.) The former analysis found Bergisuchus and Iberosuchus as sebecosuchians closely related to but excluded from Sebecidae, while the latter analysis recovers Bergisuchus well within Sebecidae, as per the definitions used in the study:

Topology of Pol et al. (2014):

- Sebecosuchia
  - Baurusuchidae
    - Cynodontosuchus
    - - Pissarrachampsa
      - - Stratiotosuchus
        - - Campinasuchus
          - - Baurusuchus albertoi
            - - Baurusuchus pachecoi
              - Baurusuchus salgadoensis
  - - - Bergisuchus
      - Iberosuchus
    - Sebecidae
      - Lorosuchus
      - - Barinasuchus
        - - - Ayllusuchus
            - Bretesuchus
          - - Sebecus huilensis
            - Sebecus icaeorhinus
            - Sebecus querejazus
            - Lumbrera form

Topology of Piacentini Pinheiro et al. (2018):

- Sebecia
  - - Stolokrosuchus
    - - - Barreirosuchus
        - Ayllusuchus
      - Itasuchidae
  - - Peirosauridae
    - - Mahajangasuchidae
      - Sebecidae
        - Sahitisuchus
        - - Bretesuchus
          - - - Barinasuchus
              - - Sebecus icaeorhinus
                - Sebecus huilensis
            - - Pehuenchesuchus
              - Lorosuchus
              - Sebecus querejazus
              - Iberosuchus
              - Bergisuchus

== Palaeobiology ==
=== Palaeoecology ===
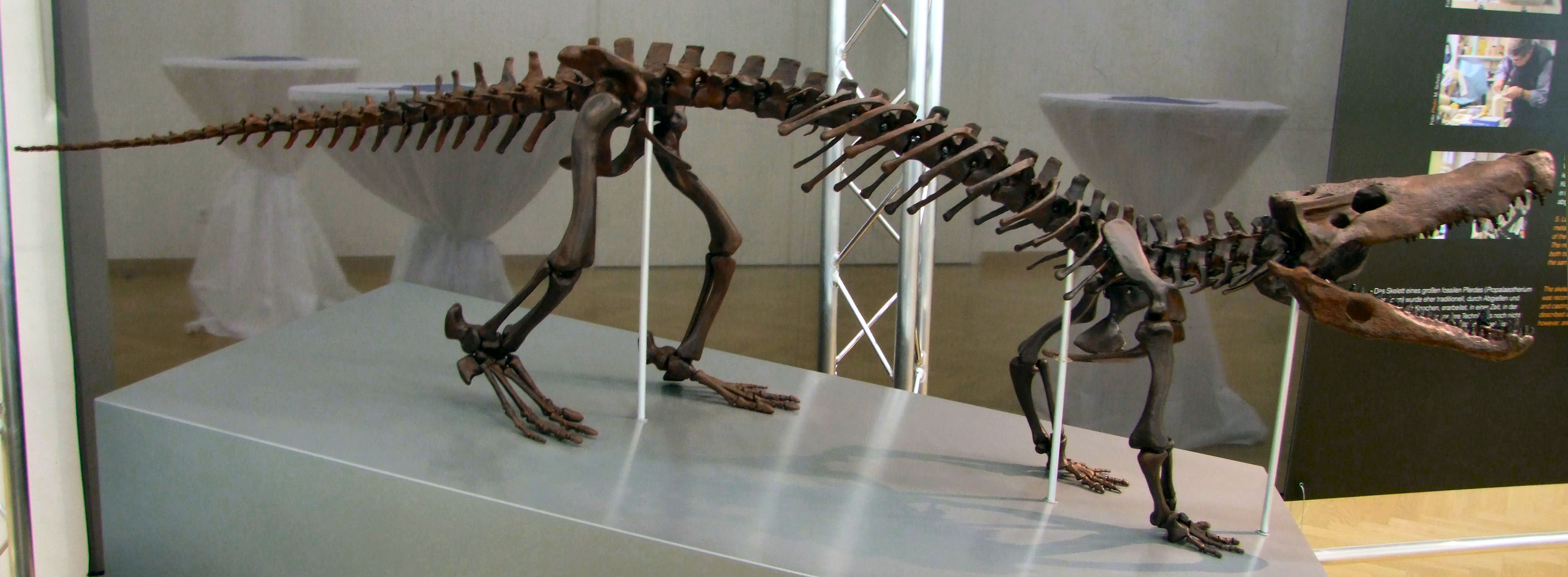
Skeleton of the contemporary terrestrial crocodilian Boverisuchus.

The Messel Pit is famous for its well-preserved fossils, which include semi-aquatic crocodylians such as Asiatosuchus and Diplocynodon. Unlike these crocodylians, Bergisuchus was a small terrestrial hypercarnivore. Rossmann and colleagues speculated extensively about the palaeoecology of Bergisuchus. They suggested that Bergisuchus did not inhabit the fluvial and lacustrine habitats around the Messel and Geiseltal sites. They interpreted the rare, fragmented material as evidence for the bones being transported into these settings from elsewhere, compared to the more abundant and more complete crocodylians from these sites that were well preserved by the local conditions. They further speculated that Bergisuchus may have inhabited drier upland regions from these lakes and rivers, potentially coexisting alongside predatory creodont mammals in the Geiseltal area and avoiding competition with the similarly terrestrial but unrelated planocraniid crocodilians like Boverisuchus.

The reduced ziphodont dentition of Bergisuchus with large teeth concentrated at the front of the jaws is somewhat similar to that of baurusuchids such as Stratiotosuchus, which have reduced their maxillary tooth count down to only 5 teeth. This has been suggested to be a specialisation for hunting large-sized prey items by imparting more powerful bites at the very front of the jaws. This is unlike the condition of most other sebecids, which have more generalised dentitions with similarly sized teeth throughout the jaw, which may have preferred smaller to mid-sized prey. The deeper snout and less compressed, stronger teeth of Bergisuchus also suggest that it was capable of withstanding greater forces relatively than planocraniids, and is inferred to be capable of catching and dismembering prey by thrashing its head in any direction, unlike planocraniids.

The unusual differentiated heterodont teeth were interpreted as evidence for a relatively complex method for processing food, and they suggested that Bergisuchus used the large canines at the front of the jaws as fangs and the smaller rear teeth to "chew" and process food before swallowing. They also suggested that the huge, exaggerated canines could possibly have been used as sexual signals or as weapons in intraspecific competition, rather than predation.

=== Palaeobiogeography ===
The presence of Bergisuchus in Europe has been regarded as evidence for a connection between the faunas from South America and Europe in the early Eocene, as other Cenozoic sebecosuchians are mostly known from South America. This link has been supported by the presence of other South American lineages contemporaneous with Bergisuchus in the Messel pit, including purported phorusrhacid birds and herpetotheriid marsupials. Eocene European ecosystems containing sebecosuchians like Bergisuchus have been compared to those of later South America, with predator guilds composed of mammals, phorusrhacids and sebecosuchians, supporting this affinity. Furthermore, Bergisuchus and Iberosuchus do not appear to be closely related to the Cretaceous sebecosuchian Doratodon, which was found across Europe during the Late Cretaceous. This appears to indicate that Bergisuchus and other European sebecosuchians did not descend from Cretaceous European sebecosuchians like Doratodon, but was instead part of a separate invasion of sebecosuchians into Europe during the Palaeogene from South America. This is further supported by the presence of the Algerian Eocene sebecosuchian Eremosuchus in Africa, which has been suggested to be evidence that sebecosuchians reached Europe from South America via Africa, as opposed to through North America where no sebecosuchian remains have been found.
