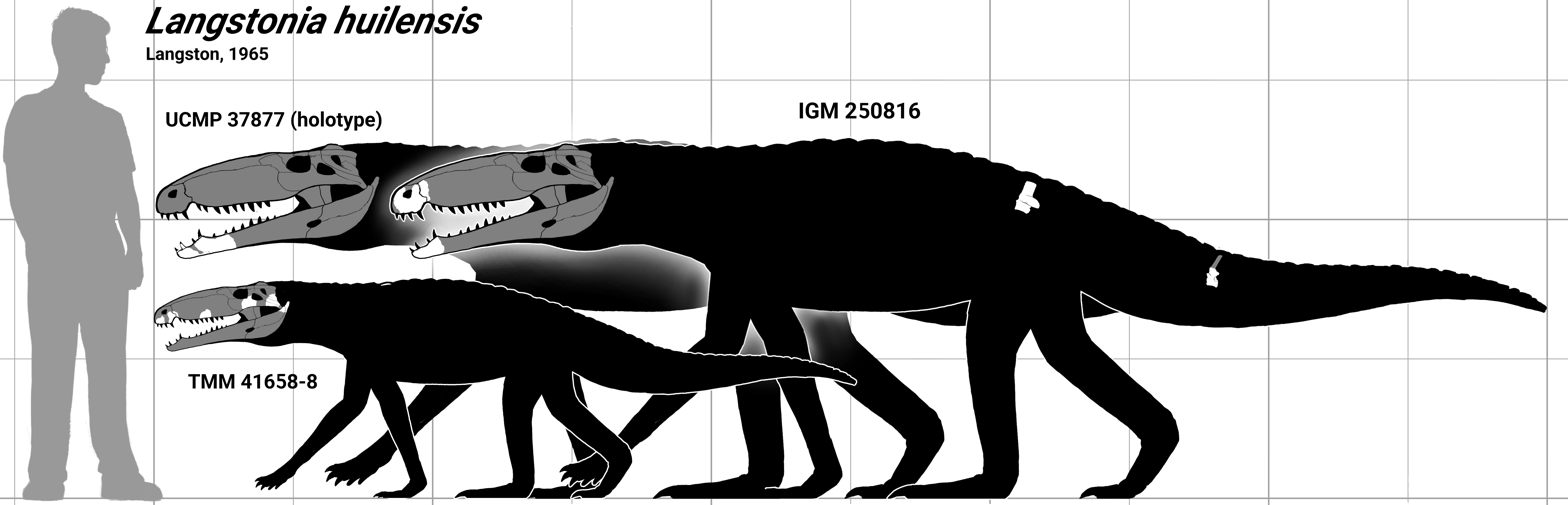
- Specimen diagram and size comparison showcasing the known specimens, preserved bones in white (grid: 50 cm)
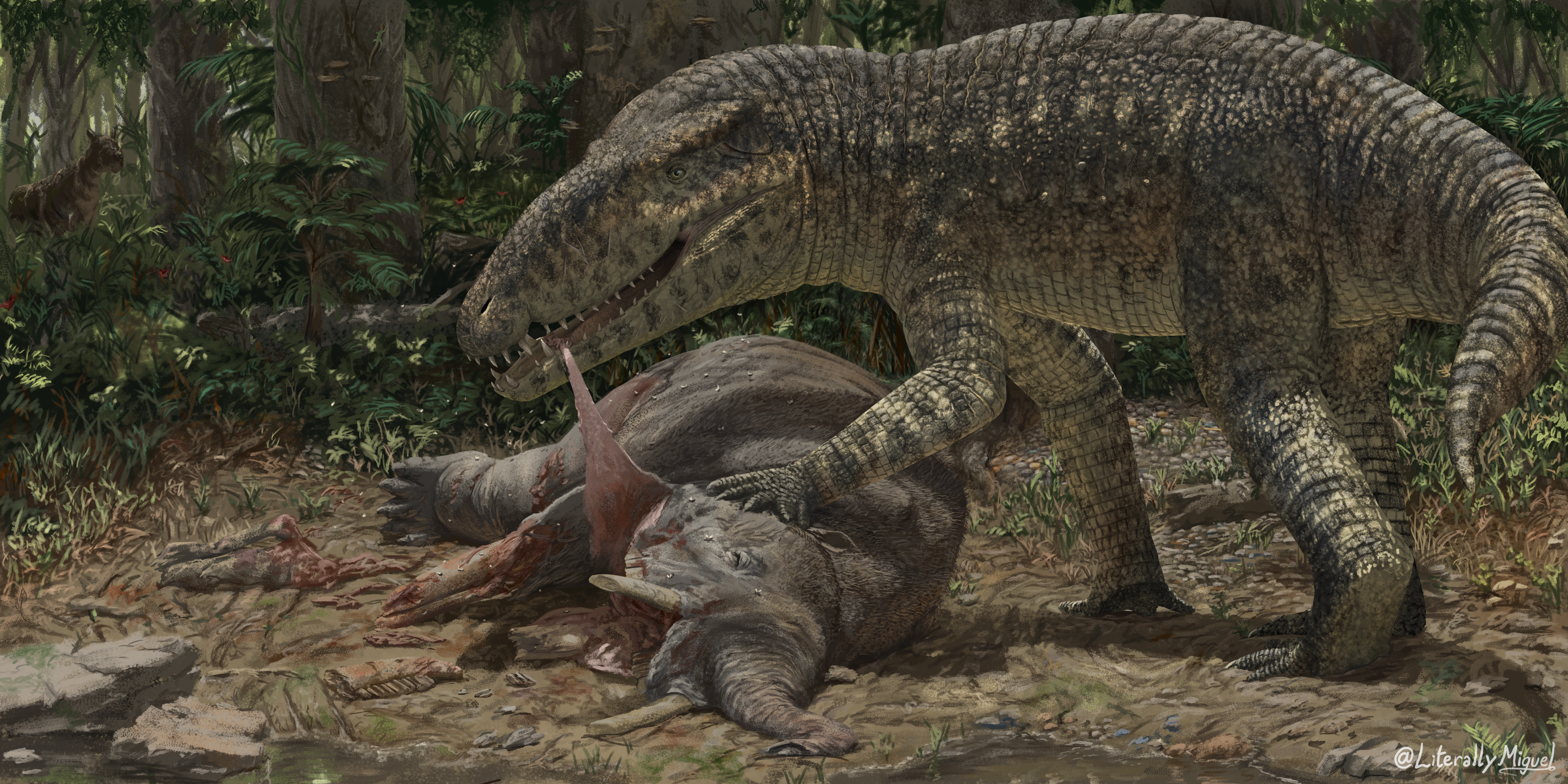
- Artistic depiction of Langstonia scavenging on a Xenastrapotherium carcass, based in serrated bitemarks from the La Venta fossil site

Scientific classification
- Kingdom: Animalia
- Phylum: Chordata
- Class: Reptilia
- Clade: Pseudosuchia
- Clade: Crocodylomorpha
- Clade: †Notosuchia
- Family: †Sebecidae
- Genus: †Langstonia; Paolillo & Linares, 2007
- Species: †L. huilensis

Binomial name
- †Langstonia huilensis (Langston, 1965)

Synonyms
- Sebecus huilensis Langston, 1965; Sebecosuchus huilensis Langston & Gasparini, 1997 (lapsus calami)

= Langstonia =

Langstonia Temporal range: Mid Miocene (Laventan) ~13–12 Ma

Extinct species of reptile

Langstonia (meaning "[crocodile] of Langston", in honor of paleontologist Wann Langston, Jr.) is an extinct genus of notosuchian crocodylomorph of the family Sebecidae. It lived in the middle Miocene (specifically in the Laventan land-mammal age), in the "Monkey Beds" of the Colombian Villavieja Formation. Langstonia was named in 2007 by Alfredo Paolillo and Omar Linares for fossils originally described by Langston in 1965 as Sebecus huilensis. Thus, the type species is L. huilensis.

== Discovery and naming ==
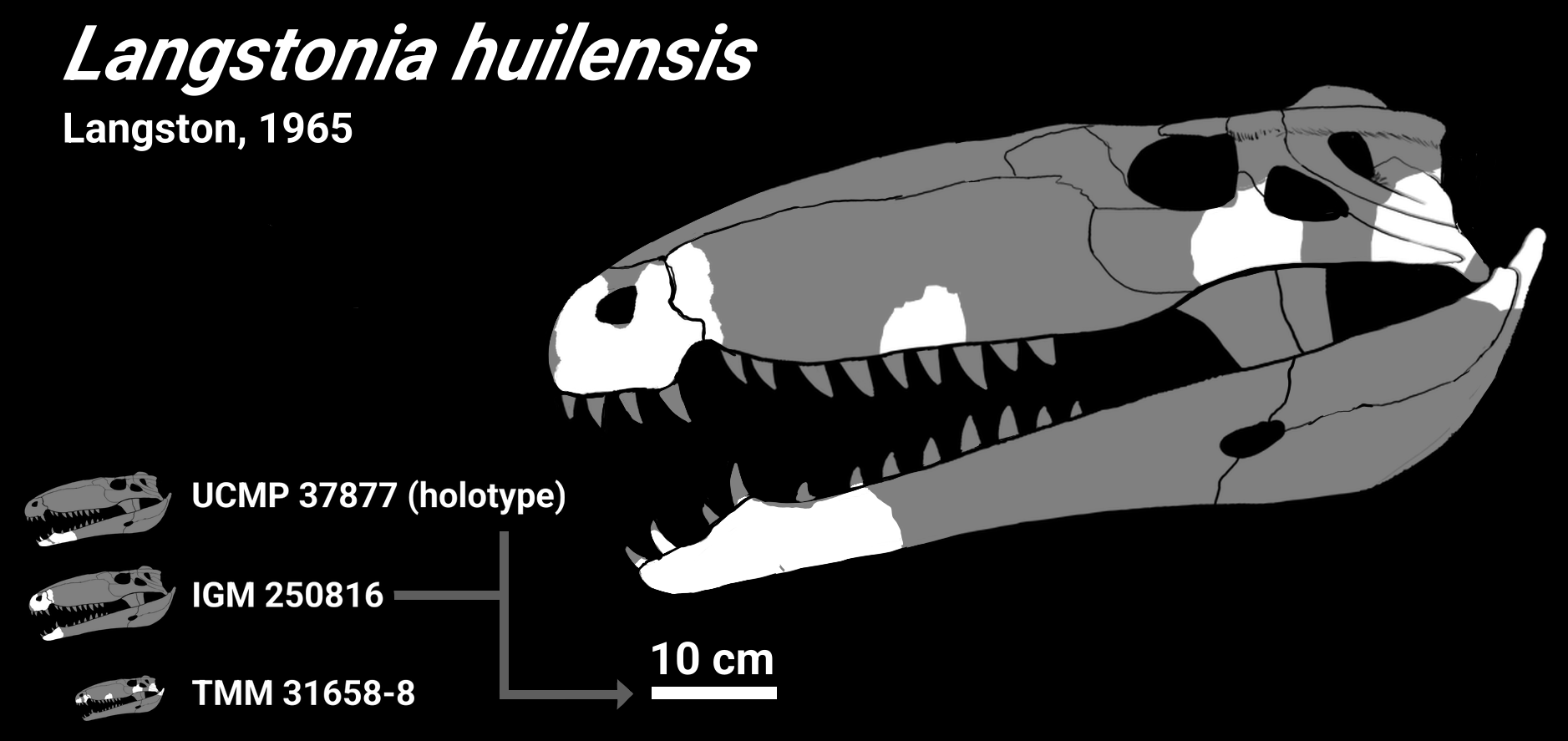
Skull diagram showcasing known remains between the specimens, scale bar representative of the holotype specimen (UCMP 37877) and IGM 250816

The first fossils of Langstonia were discovered in the province of Huila in Colombia by the Spanish geologist José Royo y Gómez, during the expeditions in the region by the American paleontologist Robert Stirton. They were found in the area called the Tatacoa Desert at the locality V-4517, characterized by gray claystone overlying sandstone sediments. These have been named the Honda Group, of the La Venta fauna, the geological formation named the "lechos de monos" (Monkey Beds) in 1945. Many of the remains discovered were then sent to the collections of the Museum of Paleontology at the University of California, Berkeley (UCMP), where they are still housed. The description of the specimens did not come until 1965, when the American paleontologist Wann Langston Jr. published his monograph Fossil Crocodylians from Colombia, in which he made a detailed analysis of several fossils of crocodylomorphs in Colombia, including the remains of other species as Purussaurus neivensis, Mourasuchus atopus, Gryposuchus colombianus and Charactosuchus fieldsi (plus a possible dyrosaurid). As for the sebecid material he designated the dentary UCMP 37877 as the holotype of a new species a fragmentary taxon, which he called Sebecus huilensis; thus extending the time range of this genus and the family, hitherto known only from remains of the Eocene of Argentina. Langston gave the taxon a new species considering that besides being larger, as the dentary fragment is 68% larger than the Argentine species, S. icaeorhinus, it was also proportionally thinner, and had with more recurved teeth being laterally compressed. Additionally Langston referred a series of zyphodont teeth in the area found this species, with some teeth referred to as similar but classified generally to Sebecus sp., which do not come from the Miocene but the Eocene, found in the department of Santander in Colombia.

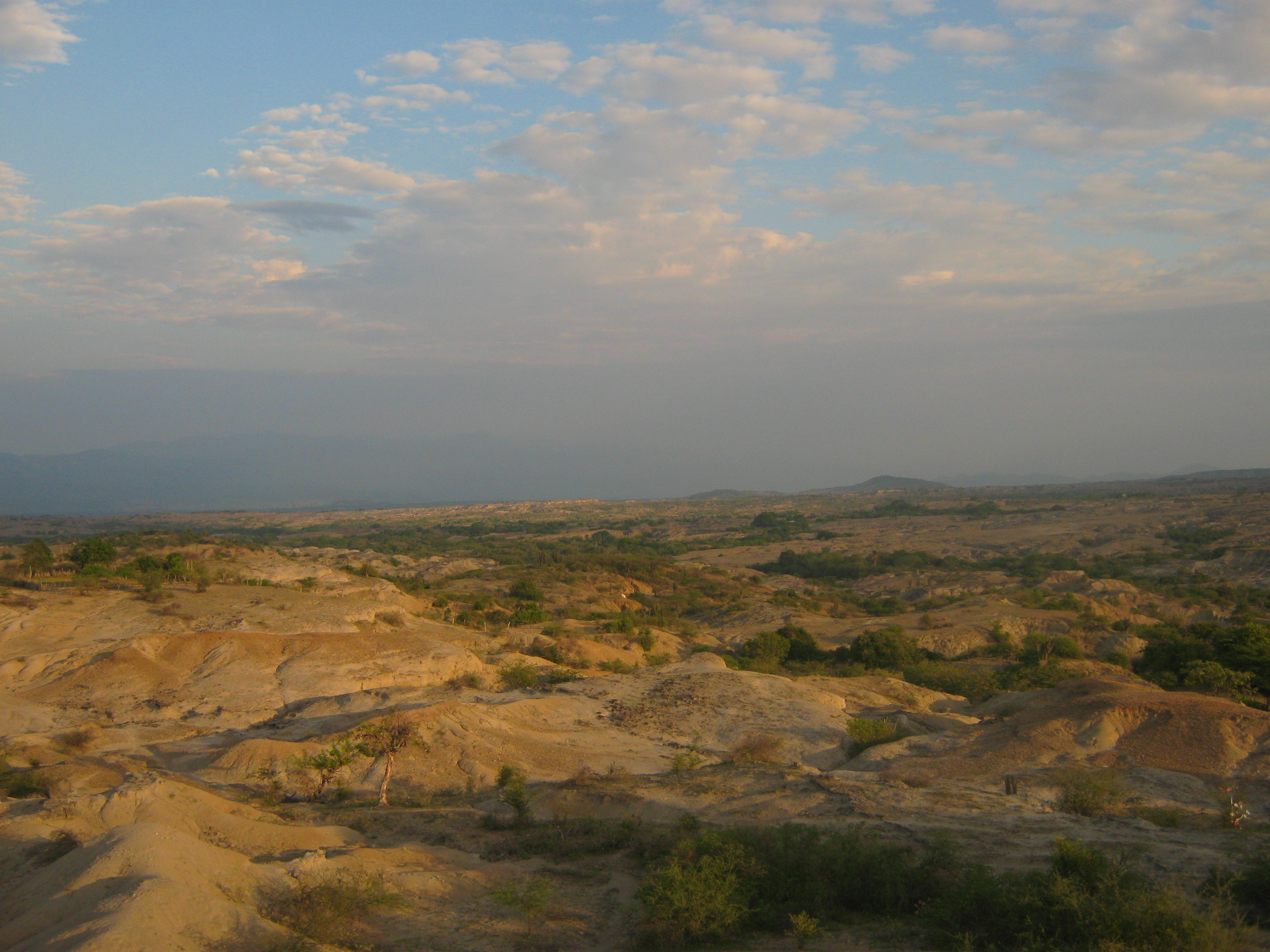
The Tatacoa Desert, in which has been discovered numerous Miocene fossils, including to Langstonia.

Subsequently, Éric Buffetaut and Robert Hoffstetter (1977) reported from the Ipururo Formation in the Amazon region of Peru the presence of a huge cranial portion (area of the snout), referring it to this genus, and although its age coincides with S. huilensis, distinguished it through it being larger and more robust.

Arthur Busbey (1986) later brought new remains of the species also from the "Monkey Beds" of Huila in Colombia, this time a fragment of premaxilla, smaller than S. icaeorhinus, and equally thin. He also described the first remains of the jugal bone, the suspensory and retroarticular joint in the jaw, and a fragment of bone scute (osteoderm), which were the earliest known for this family. Busbey also ruled out the Peruvian fossil belonging to S. huilensis, based on its unique anatomy, less spaced teeth and a wider nose.

Langston, along with the Argentine paleontologist Zulma Gasparini, reported new remains of the species in a contribution on fossil crocodylomorphs of Colombia for the book Vertebrate Paleontology of the Neotropics: The Miocene Fauna of La Venta (1997). In this case it would be new specimens of teeth, a somewhat fuller premaxilla, an anterior fragment of dentary, and two vertebrae: a sacral and a caudal, which also were unknown to this group. The specimens discovered on this occasion were deposited in the Geological Museum of Ingeominas (previous name of Colombian Geological Service).

Moreover, Alfredo Paolillo and Omar Linares described a new genus of a large Venezuelan Miocene sebecid, Barinasuchus of Venezuela. In their article they considered that the traits of two species of Sebecus, S. huilensis and S. querejazus of Paleocene of Bolivia, and their age justified the creation of separate genres for both: S. huilensis was given the genus Langstonia, in honor of its initial descriptor and his "(..)advances in knowledge of crocodylians of Tertiary Colombia in particular and South America in general", while S. querejazus was renamed Zulmasuchus, although some authors still maintain both species within Sebecus. Paolillo and Linares also clarified the status of the Peruvian fossil before assigned to the species, assigning it to Barinasuchus, although this does not rule out its presence in more southern areas; in the area of the Peruvian Amazon known as the Fitzcarrald Arch has been found a characteristically flattened tooth from the middle Miocene therefore assigned to Langstonia.

Finally, a premaxilla and maxilla fragment found in Itaboraí Basin in Brazil dating from the Middle Paleocene (and where have been found fossils of other sebecids) has been classified as related to this species, under the name of Sebecus cf. huilensis, whose main features are very similar to Langstonia, suggesting that the latter is part of a lineage of sebecids with an extensive temporal and geographical record.

== Specimens known ==
Here is a list of specimens assigned to the species, with a brief description of these. They are grouped according to the institution in which they are preserved:

=== Museum of Paleontology at the University of California ===
Not all materials from this collection were assigned to Langstonia huilensis but are included because of their similar morphology.

- UCMP 37877: The front part of a right dentary preserving the mandibular symphysis, with six tooth sockets of which five have broken teeth, collected in 1945 in the locality V-4517. This element measures 189.0 millimeters in length, being 68% higher than the rate of Sebecus icaeorhinus specimen. Their teeth are quite compressed and has a first side facing forward tooth, the second is directed upwards and the third also slopes, while others are vertical; the first teeth have a wide separation between them (diastema). Symphysis extending beyond the sixth tooth, while the bone surface is smoother than in S. icaeorhinus.
- UCMP 41308: Base of a tooth of the Upper Eocene, from the V-4620 town (Tama fauna, department of Santander, Mugrosa Formation). It measures 14.2 millimeters in diameter at the base.
- UCMP 44562: Tooth of the Late Oligocene fauna found in Coyaima, locality V-4411. It measures 22.5 mm. height at the crown.
- UCMP 40186: An elongated, slender and compressed laterally tooth, with a slight curvature, intermediate in size between 44561 and other teeth reported, with larger saws (3 per millimeter tooth; in Langstonia typically are 4 to 6 mm).
- UCMP 40220: A large tooth, locality V.4523, measures about 42.4 mm height.
- UCMP 44563: A fragment of the dental crown, found in the locality V-4528; it measured 16.3 mm at the base of the crown.
- UCMP 44561: The largest fragment dental crown reported of La Venta, locality V-4528. Reaches up to 20.5 mm. high, but its base is much wider than other teeth, reaching 23.8 mm. Apart from its size, three times that of the teeth of the holotype of the species, this tooth is characterized by a blunt, relatively straight edges and a more oval profile tranverasal fastened with small saws. It may not correspond to Langstonia.
- UCMP 44566: The lower teeth reported by Langston (1965). Recovered in the locality V-4421, measuring just 6.1 mm. wide at the base.

=== Texas Vertebrate Paleontology Collections (TxVP) ===
- TxVP 41658-8: Includes a portion of the left anterior premaxillary, middle left maxillary fragment, a fragment of the left splenial bone, back of the left suspensory bone formed by parts of the quadratojugal, the square bone, opisthotic and a squamosal, a left part of a jugal, the left retroarticular processes (partial) right to the jaw and a fragment of an osteoderm. These fragments were recovered in 1976 in the "Monkey Pod" locality of La Venta (Baraya Member of the Villavieja Formation) by Dr Lundelius Ernest Jr.

=== Museum of Geology, Colombian Geological Survey (IGM) ===
- IGM 250816: Found in the Duke 57 locality in Villavieja Formation; consists of a right premaxilla and part of the maxilla, the front left tooth, part of the dorsal border of a rostrum and two vertebrae. The premaxillary measured 12.8 cm in length, is tall and thin compared to the S. icaeorhinus being covered with fine grooves on its outer surface. It has three dental alveoli in the premaxilla, from the edge of the second tooth to the fourth, which is particularly enlarged, being twice the third (reverse that in S. icaeorhinus), while the first two teeth should be small.(Langston & Gasparini 1997, p. 114) After the fourth premaxillary tooth there is a space or diastema in that fitted the fourth lower tooth that exceeded the 3.5 centimeters; has a narrow palate, lateral nasal aperture and without mild depression around. The dentary is high, with four sockets, two projecting forward and a third and fourth straight, the latter being the largest. The associated vertebrae are an amphycoelian sacral with a sacral rib attached, with a wide, rectangular neural spine; it measured 10.7 cm high by 5.5 cm wide, while it is estimated that the sacral ribs should be 10 cm wide at its rear end. The other is an anterior caudal vertebrae, perhaps the first, with incomplete neural spine, with a broad neural canal, and measures 2.8 cm wide and 2.1 high.
- IGM 184 427: A tooth found in the Duke 91 locality. The crown of this is twice as high as it is wide, reaching 36 mm. high and 17 wide.
- IGM 250 541: Tooth from the Duke 196 locality, is incomplete and worn, but is similar to the tooth UCMP 40186. It measures 39 mm high by 27 wide.
- IGM 250 427: A tooth of the Duke 106 locality. It is also incomplete, but its measurements (52 mm high by 30 mm wide) makes it the largest tooth reported for a sebecosuchian in Colombia.
- IGM 184378: Tooth from Duke 40 locality. It measures 30 mm high by 17 wide.
- IGM 184 165: A tooth of the Duke 41 locality, that probably correspond to a first maxillar right tooth, measures 20 mm in height at the crown and 12 on the base, while its root has a length equivalent to 2.5 times the height of the crown. Unlike other teeth of L. huilensis, has a slight groove at the base of the tooth crown, on the inner side thereof.

=== Department of Vertebrate Paleontology, Museum of Natural History, Universidad de San Marcos ===
- MUSM 912: A single tooth found in the area of Fitzcarrald Arch in the localities of Inuya and Mapuya in the Amazon region of Peru; its size and shape are indistinguishable from L. huilensis.

=== Museu de Ciências da Terra, Rio de Janeiro ===
- MCT 1795-R/1796-R: consists of material of sebecid found in Itaboraí Basin in the state of Rio de Janeiro in Brazil. Includes a full left premaxilla with a tooth preserved, and a piece of left maxilla with two alveoli. By having very flattened and spaced teeth looks remarkably similar to Langstonia, being provisionally classified as Sebecus cf. huilensis.

== Paleobiology ==
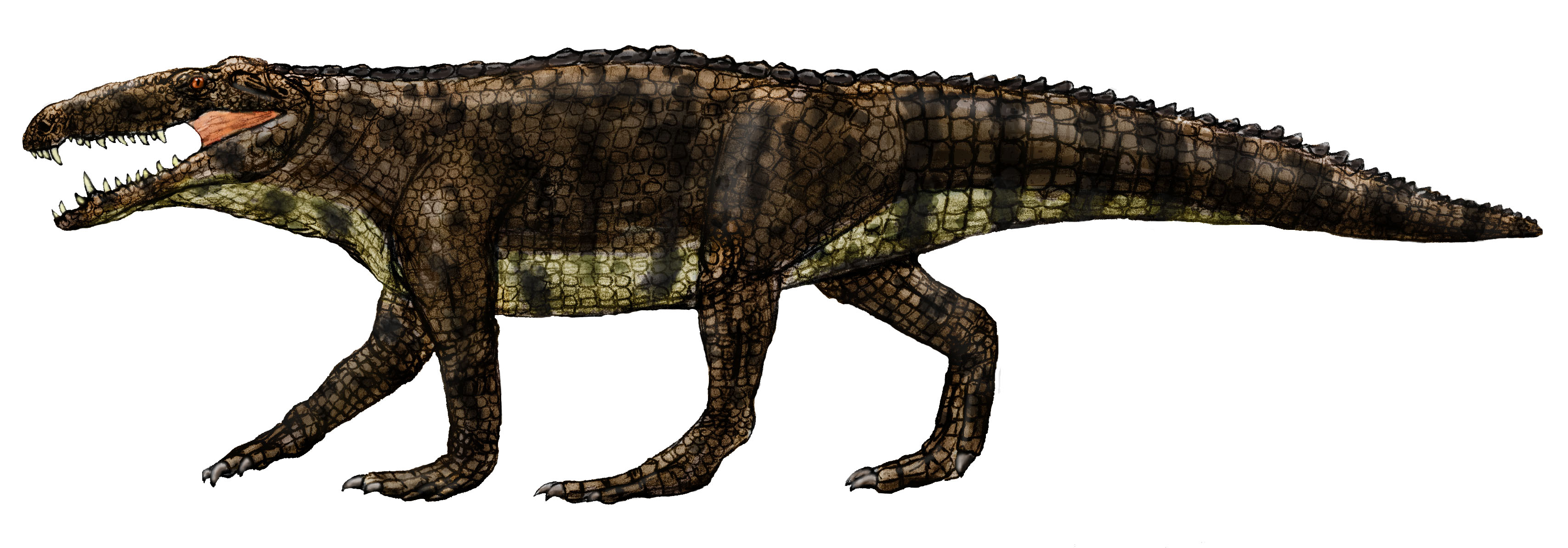
Life reconstruction of Langstonia

Due to the fragmentary remains generally known for this family, it's only possible to describe some general aspects of the appearance and biology of Langstonia. As mentioned above, the fossil type of the species is larger than Sebecus icaeorhinus with jaws and teeth even more flattened, although its general proportions are reminiscent of this species, which suggests that their skull would be higher and laterally flattened, in contrast to modern crocodilians, which generally have a horizontally flattened skull with conical teeth. Teeth are of the zyphodont kind, with very flattened sides, slightly curved back and with serrated edges with small denticles (between 5-6 denticles per millimeter in the teeth of this genus) and also without any grooves on its surface. This type of teeth appears in the close relatives of sebecids, the peirosaurids and baurusuchids of the Cretaceous and some crocodilians of the Cenozoic as the pristichampsids and some mekosuchines. These forms were land animals that used their teeth to cut and tear their prey, because the traditional method of capture of the crocodiles, using its pressure force to retain and drown his victims is not viable on land; these crocodylomorphs also had more elongated limbs, stiff back, ideal to hold the weight and give strength to run. Langston had already suggested that these teeth were indicative that this animal had more terrestrial habits than those of existing species and the Miocene contemporary crocodylians, and in the modern world only could be vaguely compared with the less aquatic habits of the caimans of the genus Paleosuchus, which have a higher muzzle and a higher degree of ossification around the eye socket, so that they partially resemble sebecids.(Langston 1965, pp. 134–135) Busbey suggested the fact that his skull was high implied that these animals seek not to make pressure during the bite indefinitely, but to produce cuts then back quickly so that the bleeding weakens their prey slowly up to devour, similar to what has been thought to be the case for the extant Komodo dragon, thereby adopting a strategy of stalking in areas where prey transit frequently.

Since in the fauna of La Venta, although there were some large mammalian predators (sparassodonts, Lycopsis longirostrus and Dukecynus), neither of them equated in size to the contemporary crocodylomorphs, Argot (2004, p. 513), and given the absence of large predatory birds phorusrhacids as in the southern part of the continent, these sebecids were probably the terrestrial apex predators in its ecosystem. The fossils found of other species - big fishes, manatees, large browsing meridiungulates as Granastrapotherium and Huilatherium, and some grazers as Pericotoxodon - indicate that the climate was warm and humid with heavy rainfall and with drought periods not extending beyond 3–4 months, consisting of watersheds, forests and certain adjacent areas of open grasslands where it could hunt down a large variety of species belonging to the megafauna.

The disappearance of the system of large rivers of the Amazon lake system and the gradual uplift of the Andes caused major ecological changes in South America in the mid-Miocene. The last sebecids, Langstonia and Barinasuchus were likely apex predators in their environment, and as an effect they would be particularly susceptible to ecological changes that caused other lineages, particularly hoofed mammals (such as groups Astrapotheria, Leontiniidae, Adianthidae and Notohippidae) to die out, thus leading to extinction to the last notosuchian crocodilomorphs of the world.

== Phylogeny ==
Langstonia is considered part of Sebecosuchia, a lineage of ziphodont terrestrial crocodylomorphs forming part of a separate lineage of the southern continent of Gondwana. As noted earlier, this species formerly part of the genus Sebecus and phylogenetic analyzes have consistently shown that these forms a clade within Sebecidae next to S. icaeorhinus and Zulmasuchus, not so closely related to Barinasuchus and Bretesuchus. Cladogram based on Pol & Powell (2011).

- - - Chimaerasuchus
    - Sphagesaurus
  - Sebecosuchia
    - Pehuenchesuchus
    - - Cynodontosuchus
      - Baurusuchidae
        - - Pabwehshi
          - Stratiotosuchus
        - - Baurusuchus pachecoi
          - Baurusuchus salgadoensis
      - - Bergisuchidae
          Bergisuchus
        - Iberosuchidae
          Iberosuchus
        - Sebecidae
          - Lorosuchus
          - - Barinasuchus
            - - - Ayllusuchus
                - Bretesuchus
              - - Form of Lumbrera
                - Langstonia
                - Sebecus
                - Zulmasuchus
