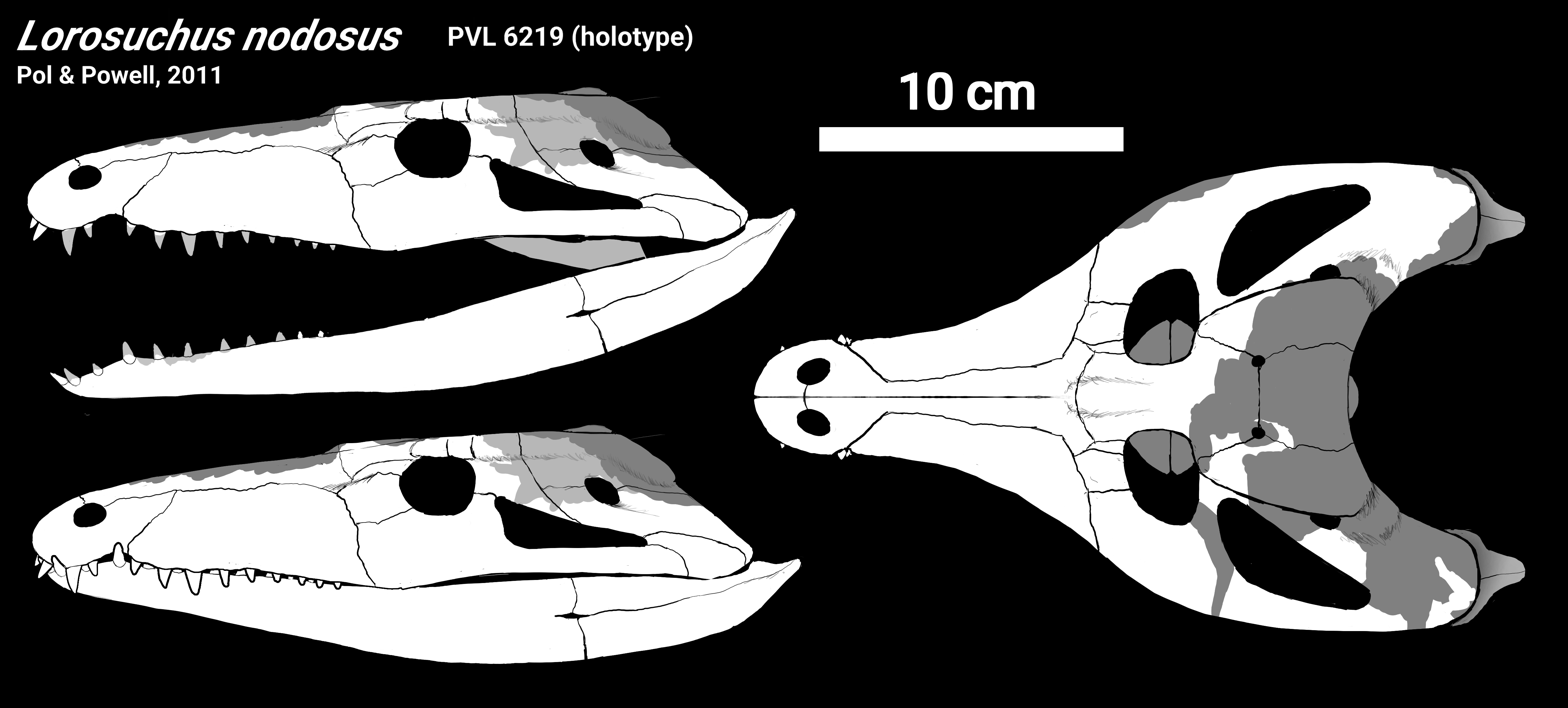
- Skull diagram of Lorosuchus

Scientific classification
- Kingdom: Animalia
- Phylum: Chordata
- Class: Reptilia
- Clade: Archosauria
- Clade: Pseudosuchia
- Clade: Crocodylomorpha
- Clade: †Notosuchia
- Clade: †Sebecosuchia
- Clade: †Sebecia
- Family: †Sebecidae
- Genus: †Lorosuchus; Pol & Powell 2011

Type species
- †Lorosuchus nodosus Pol & Powell 2011

= Lorosuchus =

Lorosuchus Temporal range: Paleocene (Peligran-Riochican) ~61.7–55.8 Ma

Extinct genus of reptiles

Lorosuchus is an extinct genus of sebecid mesoeucrocodylian known from the Río Loro Formation in Tucumán Province of northwestern Argentina.

== Discovery ==
Lorosuchus is known from the holotype PVL 6219, a nearly complete skull found articulated with the lower jaws and fragmentary postcranial remains. It was collected at the southern end of Medina Range, near the El Cadillal Lake from the Río Loro Formation, dating to the Thanetian or the Selandian stage of the Middle to Late Paleocene, about 61.7 to 55.8 million years ago. Lorosuchus is characterized by a unique combination of characters, including five autapomorphies such as an elevated narial rim and the presence of a crest on the anteromedial margins of both premaxillae. Phylogenetically, Lorosuchus is currently recognized as the basalmost known sebecid.

== Etymology ==
Lorosuchus was named by Diego Pol and Jaime E. Powell in 2011 and the type species is Lorosuchus nodosus. The generic name is derived from Loro in reference to the Río Loro Formation in which Lorosuchus was found, and suchus, Latinized from the Greek souchos, an Egyptian crocodile god. The specific name named after the particular ornamentation of the dorsal surface of the skull, which resembles the non-related, basal archosauriform Proterochampsa.

== Classification ==
Below is a cladogram from Pol and Powell (2011) showing the placement of Lorosuchus within Sebecosuchia:

- - - Chimaerasuchus
    - Sphagesaurus
  - Sebecosuchia
    - Pehuenchesuchus
    - - Cynodontosuchus
      - Baurusuchidae
        - - Pabwehshi
          - Stratiotosuchus
        - - Baurusuchus pachecoi
          - Baurusuchus salgadoensis
      - - Bergisuchidae
          Bergisuchus
        - Iberosuchidae
          Iberosuchus
        - Sebecidae
          - Lorosuchus
          - - Barinasuchus
            - - - Ayllusuchus
                - Bretesuchus
              - - Lumbrera form
                - Langstonia
                - Sebecus
                - Zulmasuchus
