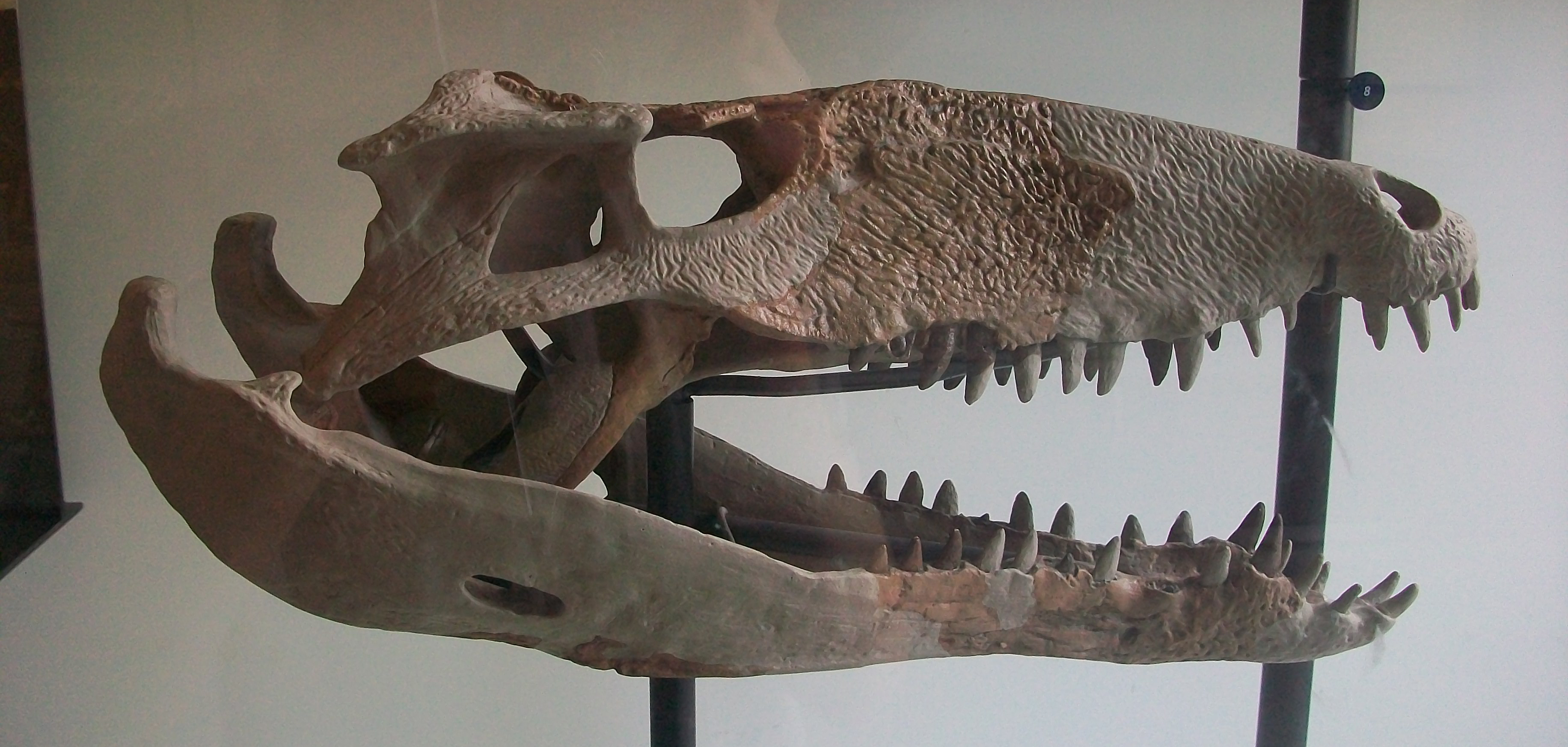
- Skull of Sebecus icaeorhinus

Scientific classification
- Kingdom: Animalia
- Phylum: Chordata
- Class: Reptilia
- Clade: Pseudosuchia
- Clade: Crocodylomorpha
- Clade: †Notosuchia
- Family: †Sebecidae
- Genus: †Sebecus; Simpson, 1937

Type species
- †Sebecus icaeorhinus Simpson, 1937

Species
- †S. ayrampu Bravo et al., 2021; †S. icaeorhinus Simpson, 1937 (Type)

= Sebecus =

Sebecus Temporal range: Paleocene - Mid Eocene 59.4–37.2 Ma Possible Late Miocene-Early Pliocene record

Extinct genus of reptiles

Sebecus (meaning "Sobek" in Latin) is an extinct genus of sebecid crocodylomorph from Paleogene period of South America. Like other sebecosuchians, it was entirely terrestrial and carnivorous. The genus is currently represented by two species, the type S. icaeorhinus and S. ayrampu. Several other species have been referred to Sebecus, but were later reclassified as their own genera.

== Classification ==
Because it is represented by relatively complete fossil material, Sebecus has been used to define larger groups of crocodyliforms such as Sebecidae and Sebecosuchia. The suborder Sebecosuchia was established to group Sebecus with Baurusuchus and has grown to include many other sebecid and baurusuchid members. While Sebecus and Baurusuchus are well known, other forms are known from only a few fragmentary specimens.

Sebecus has been placed in various positions among metasuchian crocodyliforms. It has often been placed in a larger sebecosuchian clade. Carvalho et al. (2004) used Sebecus in their definition of Sebecidae, considering the clade to include the most recent common ancestor of Sebecus and Libycosuchus and all of its descendants. Carvalho et al. also established a sebecisuchian clade that was defined using Sebecus and referred to as Baurusuchoidea. Sebecus and other sebecosuchians are often contrasted with the smaller-bodied Cretaceous notosuchians. Turner and Calvo (2005) considered Sebecosuchia to be the sister taxon of Notosuchia and placed Sebecus as a basal member the clade. Several recent phylogenetic analyses have resulted in a polyphyletic Sebecosuchia, with some members such as Baurusuchus being more closely related to notosuchians and other such as Sebecus forming a clade of metasuchians more distantly related to Notosuchia. Larsson and Sues (2007) named this clade Sebecia. The following cladogram simplified after an analysis of notosuchians presented by Pol et al. in 2012.

- Notosuchia
  - - - Uruguaysuchidae
        - Uruguaysuchus
        - Araripesuchus buitreraensis
        - Araripesuchus gomesii
        - Araripesuchus patagonicus
        - Araripesuchus tsangatsangana
        - Araripesuchus wegeneri
      - Peirosauridae
        - Hamadasuchus
        - Lomasuchus
        - Mahajangasuchus
        - Gasparinisuchus*
        - Stolokrosuchus
        - Uberabasuchus
    - - Candidodon
      - Ziphosuchia
        - Libycosuchus
        - - Simosuchus
          - - Malawisuchus
            - - - Notosuchus
                - - Comahuesuchus
                  - Mariliasuchus
              - - - Chimaerasuchus
                  - Sphagesaurus
                - Sebecosuchia
                  - Pehuenchesuchus
                  - - Baurusuchus
                    - Cynodontosuchus
                    - - Pabwehshi
                      - Stratiotosuchus
                    - - Bergisuchus
                      - Iberosuchus
                      - Sebecidae
                        - Lorosuchus
                        - - Barinasuchus
                          - - - Ayllusuchus
                              - Bretesuchus
                            - - Lumbrera form
                              - Langstonia
                              - Sebecus
                              - Zulmasuchus

*Note: Based on a specimen that was reassigned from Peirosaurus.

Even though Zulmasuchus and Langstonia were found to be distinct from Sebecus, some authors still uses the original classification, as all in Sebecus. But this classification is currently not a major scientific consensus.

== History and species ==
Named by American paleontologist George Gaylord Simpson in 1937, Sebecus was one of the first known sebecosuchians. Simpson described the type species, S. icaeorhinus, from a fragmented skull and lower jaw found in the Sarmiento Formation. The specimen was discovered by the American Museum of Natural History's First Scarritt Expedition to Patagonia, during 1930 and 1931. Teeth had been known since 1906 when Argentine paleontologist Florentino Ameghino associated them with carnivorous dinosaurs. The more complete material found by Simpson firmly established that the new animal was a crocodyliform. Although Simpson's fossil was considered one of the best finds of the expedition, Simpson described the genus only briefly in 1937. He noted its unusual ziphodont dentition in which the teeth were laterally compressed and serrated. Simpson was preparing a more detailed monograph on the genus, but entered the United States Army before its completion. Another American paleontologist, Edwin Harris Colbert, completed Simpson's work, thoroughly describing the genus and placing it in a new family, Sebecidae. Colbert placed Sebecus and the Cretaceous baurusuchid Baurusuchus (also from South America) in the suborder Sebecosuchia (erected by Simpson for all ziphodont crocodylomorphs), as both had deep snouts and ziphodont teeth.

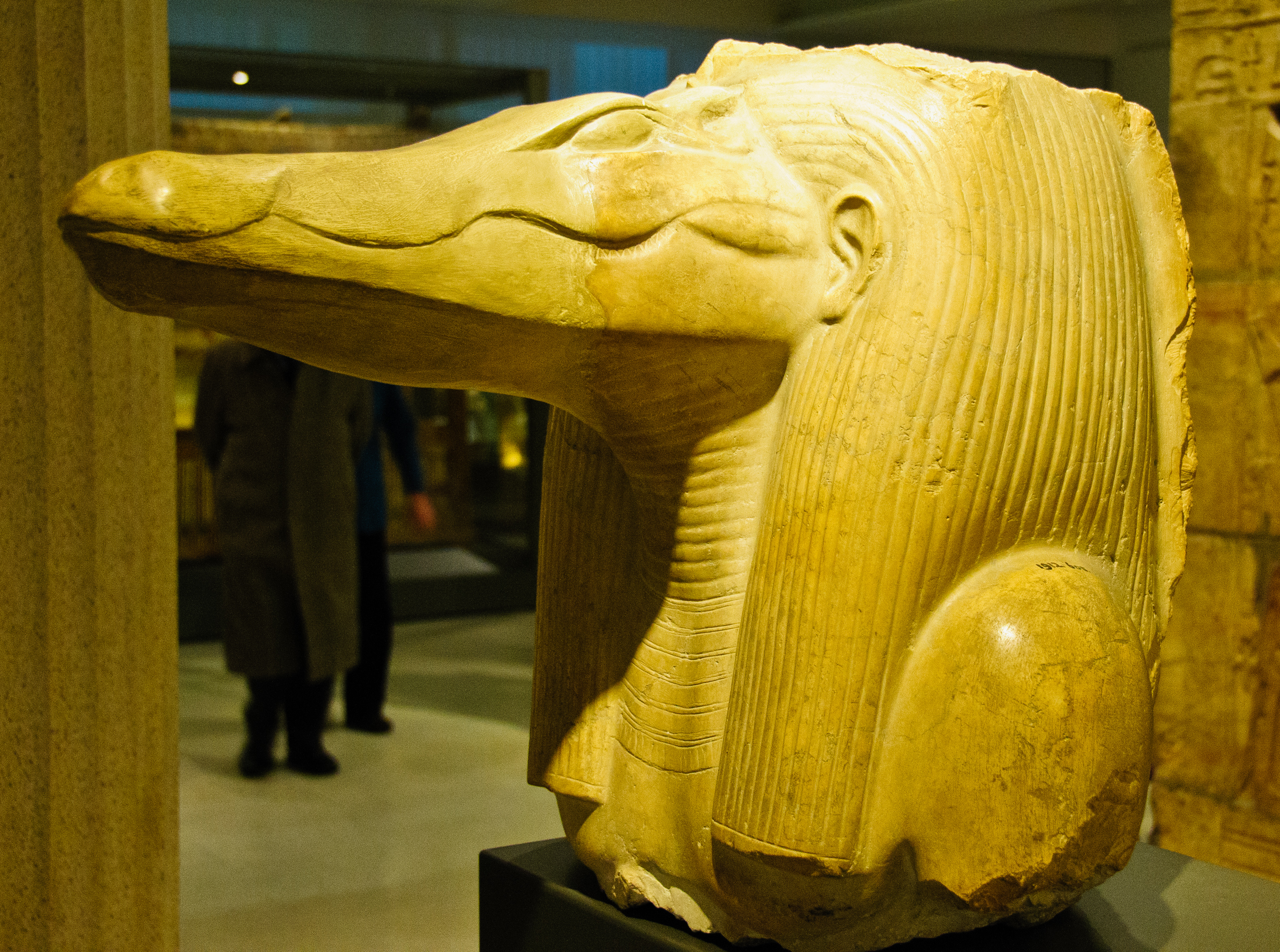
Bust of Sobek, the ancient Egyptian crocodile god and the namesake of Sebecus

The name Sebecus is a Latinisation of Sobek (also called Sebek), the crocodile god of ancient Egypt. Sebek was considered an alternative to the Greek χάμψα, or "champsa" in crocodilian nomenclature (the Greek historian Herodotus claimed that champsa was the Egyptian word for crocodile). The specific name icaeorhinus of the type species is derived from the Greek words εικαίοs and ῥῑνός. Εικαίοs means "random" or "not according to plan" and ῥῑνός means "nose", in reference to the animal's unusually deep snout.

In 1965, American paleontologist Wann Langston, Jr. named a second species, S. huilensis, from the Miocene Honda Group at the La Venta locality in Colombia. S. huilensis was named on the basis of skull fragments. The deposits are Laventan in age (about 13 million years old), extending the range of the genus into the Neogene by around 40 million years. In 1977, remains were described from the Miocene of Peru.

A third species of Sebecus, S. querejazus, was named in 1991 from the early Paleocene Santa Lucia Formation in Bolivia. This extended the range of Sebecus back to the beginning of the Paleogene, soon after the Cretaceous–Paleogene extinction event. In 1993, Gasparini et al. described Sebecus carajazus. This was not a fourth species but a misspelling, or lapsus calami, of Sebecus querejazus.

A 2007 study of sebecids reclassified several species. The two species S. huilensis and S. querejazus were given their own genera, Zulmasuchus and Langstonia, respectively. Langstonia huilensis, named after Langston, was distinguished from Sebecus by its narrower snout and widely spaced teeth. Zulmasuchus querejazus, named after Zulma Gasparini, one of the authors of the study, differs from Sebecus in its wider snout.

The postcranial skeleton of S. icaeorhinus was virtually unknown until Pol et al. (2012) described postcranial remains of several individuals of this species, including a partially articulated specimen MPEF-PV 1776 with anterior region of the dentary (allowing the identification of this individual as representing S. icaeorhinus) and most of the postcranial skeleton preserved.

In 2021 another species was described by Bravo et al. based on remains that were found in north-western Argentina. The rock layer the partial cranium and mandible belong to are part of the Paleocene Mealla Formation. This new species was named Sebecus ayrampu after the ayrampu (or ayrampo), the fruit of the Tunilla genus of cacti, which resembles the reddish-brown colour of the Maella Formation's sediments.

== Description ==
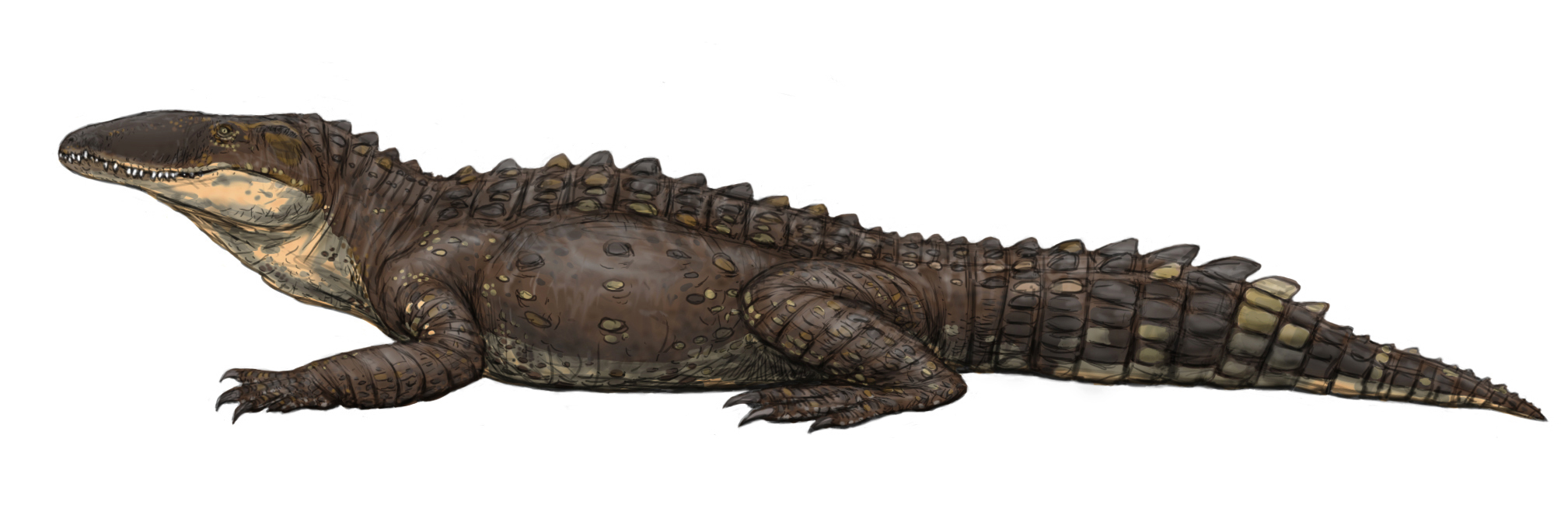
Restoration

Estimates of total body length and mass of MPEF-PV 1776 vary from 2.2 to 3.1 m, and from 52.2 to 113.5 kg, respectively. The postcranial skeleton of Sebecus provides additional evidence of its terrestriality. Its limbs, especially femora, were proportionally longer than limbs of living crocodilians; the shoulder-to-hip length of its body can be estimated at 2.3 times the length of the femur - similar to another, unrelated terrestrial crocodylomorph, Boverisuchus, while American alligators have proportionally shorter femora.

Unlike modern crocodilians, Sebecus has a deep, narrow snout. The nares, or nostrils, open anteriorly at the tip of the snout. While most crocodilians have flat skulls that are raised near the eyes and postorbital region behind the eyes, the skull of Sebecus is essentially level. The great depth of the snout makes most of the length of its upper margin level with the margin of the orbits, or eye sockets. The supratemporal fenestrae, two holes on the skull table, are relatively small.

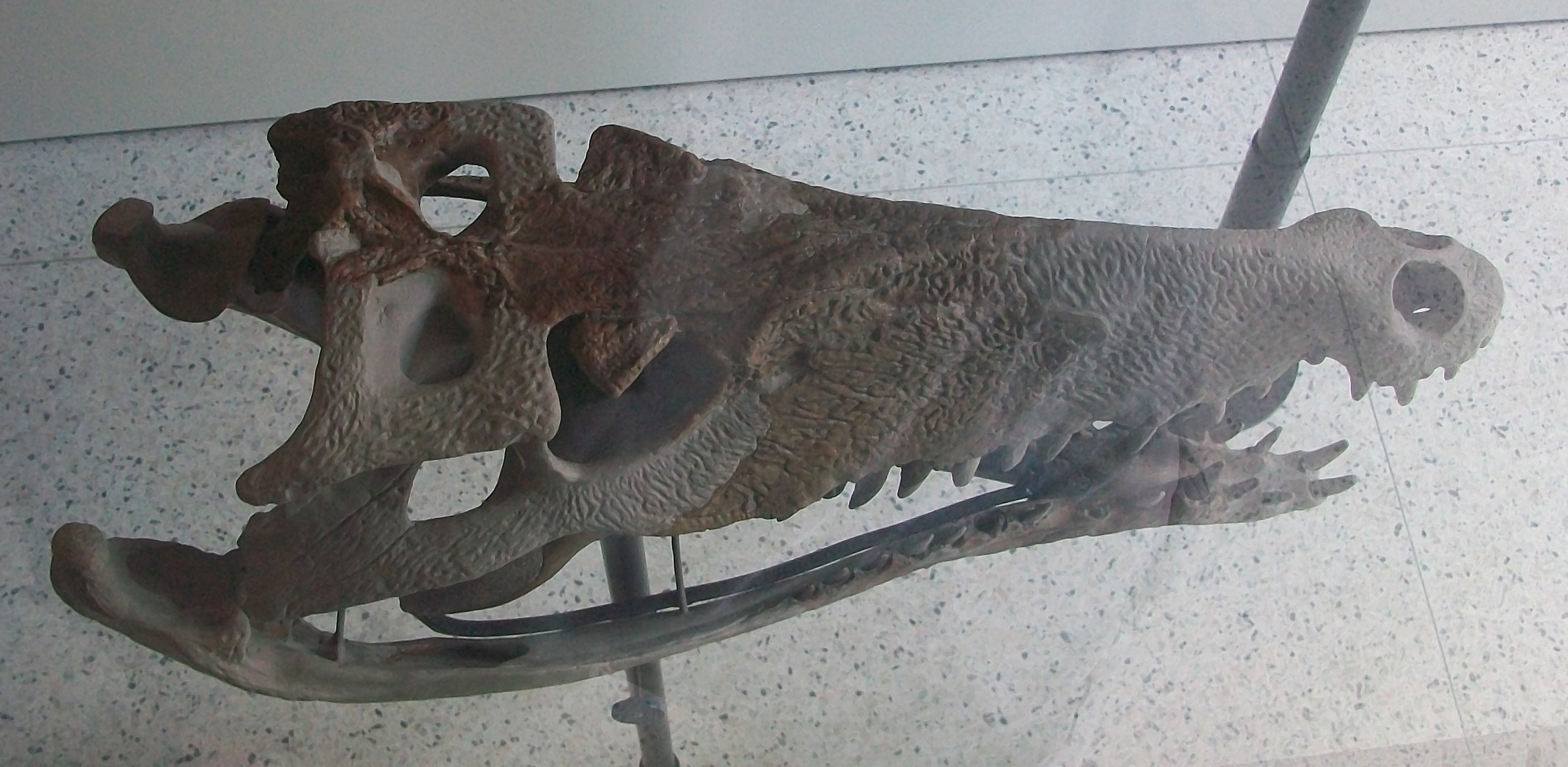
Top view of a cast of the skull of Sebecus icaeorhinus (AMNH 3160)

Laterally compressed, or ziphodont teeth, are characteristic of Sebecus and other sebecosuchians. Although the teeth vary in size, they are homodont, having a similar shape throughout the jaw. At the tips of the upper and lower jaws, the teeth are rounder in cross-section. The fourth dentary tooth is raised in the lower jaw to form an effective canine. The foremost teeth of the lower jaw are much smaller and lower than the fourth tooth. At the tip of the jaw the first dentary tooth is procumbent, or directed forward. The teeth of the upper and lower jaws form an alternate pattern to allow the jaw to close tightly. A notch is present between the maxilla and premaxilla bones of the upper jaw, accommodating the fourth dentary tooth when the jaw is closed. The procumbent first dentary teeth fit between the first and second premaxillary teeth. This close fit allows the serrated edges of the teeth shear with one another.

The articulation between the articular and quadrate bones at the jaw joint is well developed. Along with the broad downturned "wings" formed by the pterygoid and ectopterygoid bones at the bottom of the skull, this articulation restricts the jaw to up-and-down movement. The jaw movement and close shearing of the teeth suggest that Sebecus was carnivorous. Its compressed, blade-like teeth would have been well-suited for cutting meat. In contrast, living crocodilians have circular, widely spaced teeth and usually consume their food in large pieces. Sebecus likely consumed food in a manner more similar to theropod dinosaurs than living crocodilians. In particular, the teeth of tyrannosaurids bear the closest resemblance to those of Sebecus. Both animals have serrated teeth with rounded projections called denticles, and sharp clefts between the denticles called diaphyses. These diaphyses compress meat fibers between the serrations and rip them apart. Ultrastructural analyses using electron microscopes have revealed microwear scratches on the teeth that are suggestive of this form of cutting.

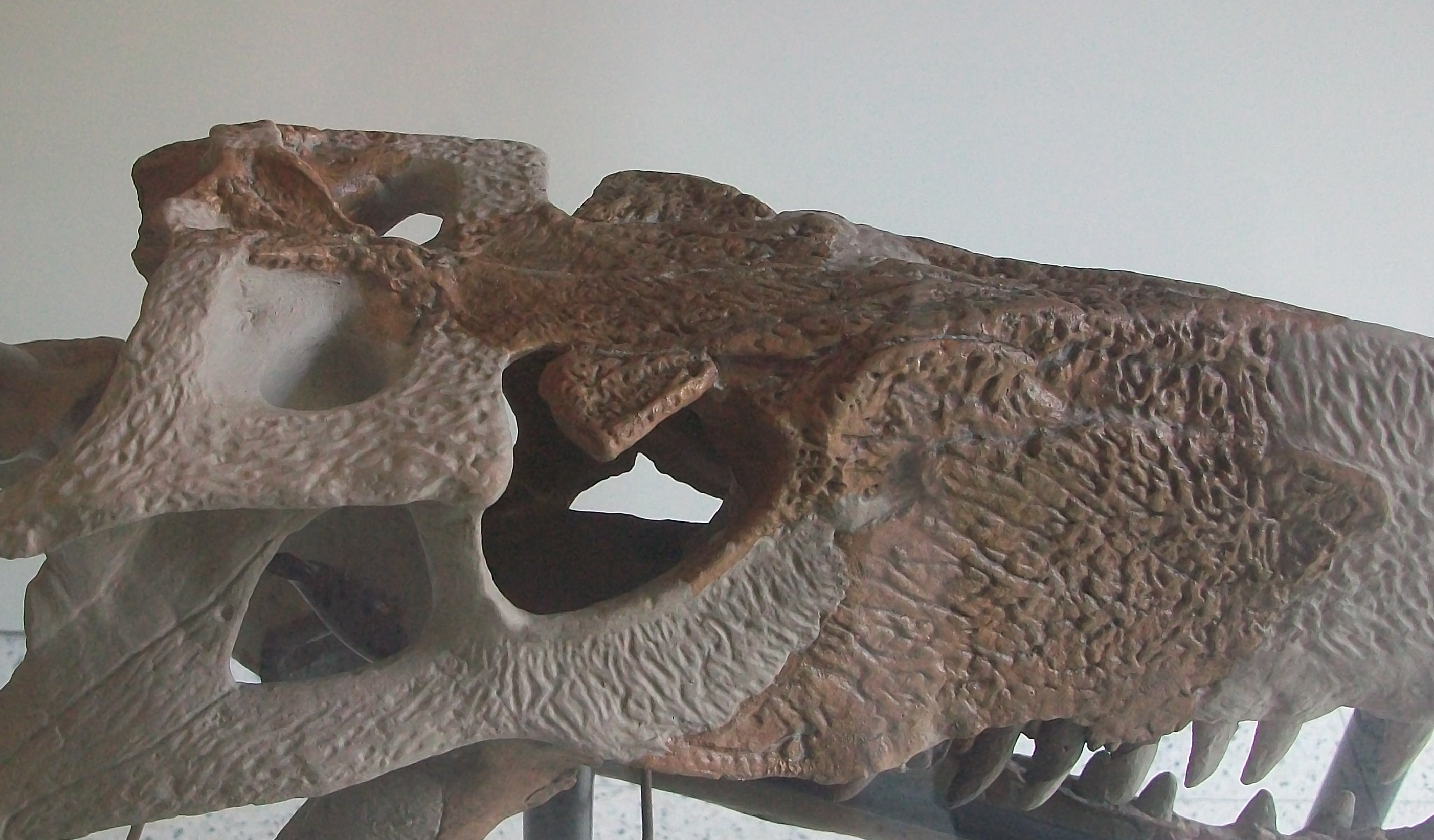
A cast of the skull roof and jaws of Sebecus icaeorhinus (AMNH 3160)

Colbert's monograph on Sebecus included a description of the brain, Eustachian tubes, and jaw musculature. Details of these soft tissues were inferred from characteristics of the skull and endocasts, or molds of its interior. The deep snout of Sebecus makes the shape of its brain somewhat different from those of living crocodiles, although its structure is the same. The olfactory bulb is elongate and makes up a significant portion of the brain. The cerebrum is narrow and long in comparison to crocodilians, and tapers toward the olfactory bulb. The temporal lobes are somewhat smaller than those of living crocodilians. Colbert interpreted the smaller cerebrum of Sebecus as a sign of primitiveness, with an evolutionary trend toward larger brain size in crocodilians. Hans C. E. Larsson performed a 2001 study of the endocranial anatomy of the dinosaur Carcharodontosaurus saharicus, comparing the ratio of its cerebrum to its total brain volume to the ratios of other prehistoric reptiles. Larsson found that Sebecus and Allosaurus fragilis had similar ratios to C. saharicus, falling within the 95% confidence range characterizing living reptile species.

The Eustachian tubes, passages that connect the middle ear with the pharynx, are very complex in crocodilians. Unlike those of other vertebrates, the tubes are made of several interconnected branches. This branching is fully developed in Sebecus, and probably appeared much earlier in crocodylomorphs.

The jaw muscles of Sebecus were likely similar to those of living crocodilians, but the distinctively deep skull of Sebecus indicates that the muscles were longer. In Sebecus, the shape of the skull and jaws provides more room for adductor muscles, or muscles that close the jaws. The supratemporal fenestrae at the top of the skull are relatively wide, allowing for the passage of large muscles. In crocodilians, the depressor muscle that opens the jaws originates near the top of the skull and inserts into a projection at the back of the jaw called the retroarticular process. Living crocodilians have a straight retroarticular process at the back of the jaw and a low point of origin for the depressor muscle. Sebecus, with its deeper skull, has a higher point of origin for the depressor, but the retroarticular process curves upward to make the length of the depressor about the same as it is in crocodilians. Like living crocodilians, the depressor muscle of Sebecus was relatively underdeveloped. Therefore, while the closure of the jaws would have been very strong, the ability to open the jaws would be much weaker.
