= Ilchunaia =

Ilchunaia Temporal range: Late Eocene (Divisaderan-Tinguirirican) ~37.2–33.9 Ma

Scientific classification
- Kingdom: Animalia
- Phylum: Chordata
- Class: Reptilia
- Clade: Archosauria
- Clade: Pseudosuchia
- Clade: Crocodylomorpha
- Clade: †Notosuchia
- Family: †Sebecidae
- Genus: †Ilchunaia; Rusconi, 1946

Type species
- †Ilchunaia parva Rusconi, 1946

Extinct genus of reptiles

Ilchunaia is an extinct genus of sebecid mesoeucrocodylian. Fossils have been found from the Divisadero Largo Formation of Argentina dating back to the Late Eocene, and a locality in Mendoza, Argentina dating back to the Oligocene. Little material is known from the genus, with only the anterior portion of the skull being present to study (the holotype has since been lost).

== Taxonomy ==
The placement of Ilchunaia within Sebecosuchidae has been questioned in the past, and many recent phylogenetic analyses have shown the family to be entirely paraphyletic, with members most likely being basal sebecosuchians ancestral to the baurusuchids.
