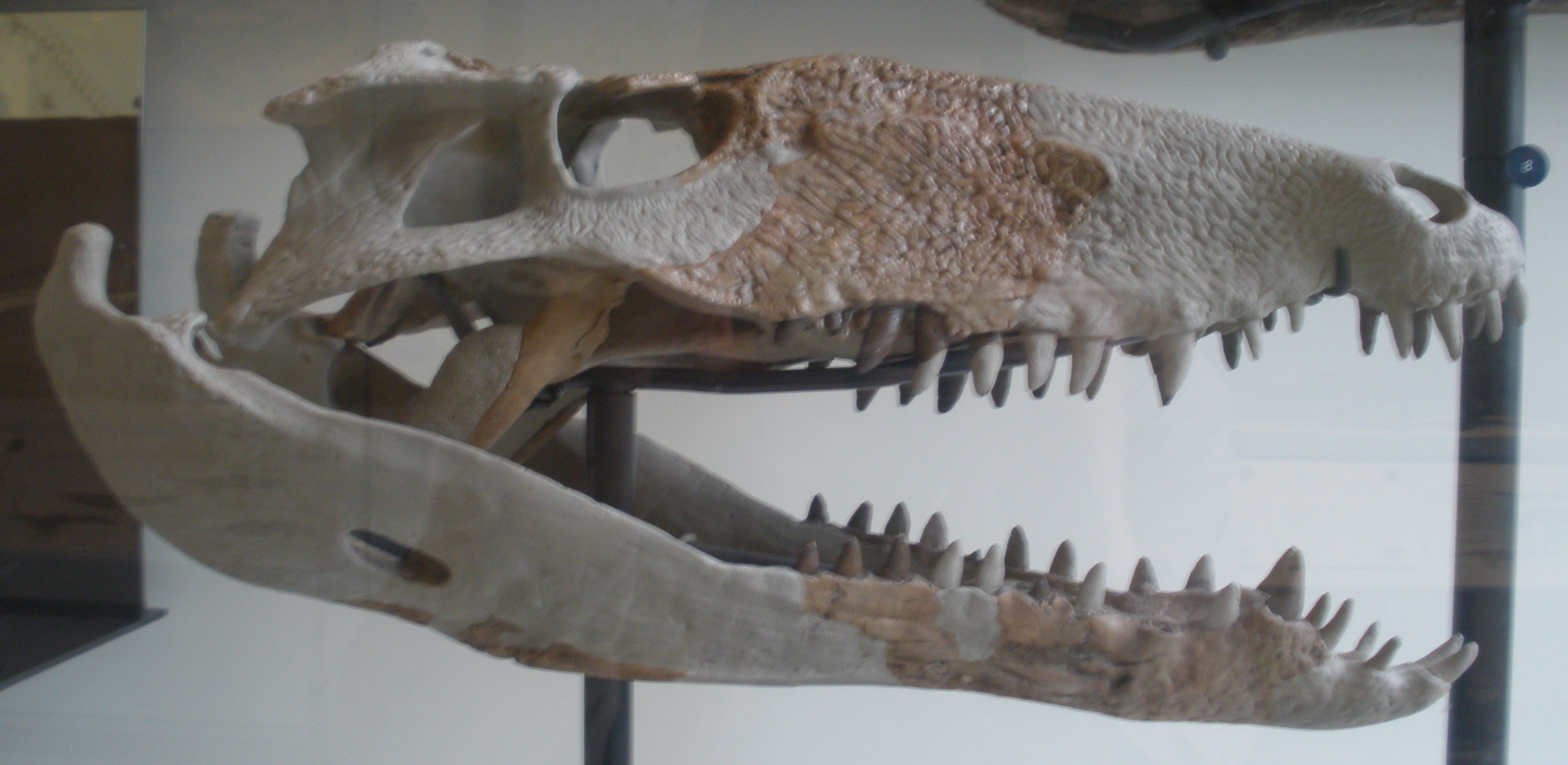
- Skull of Sebecus icaeorhinus
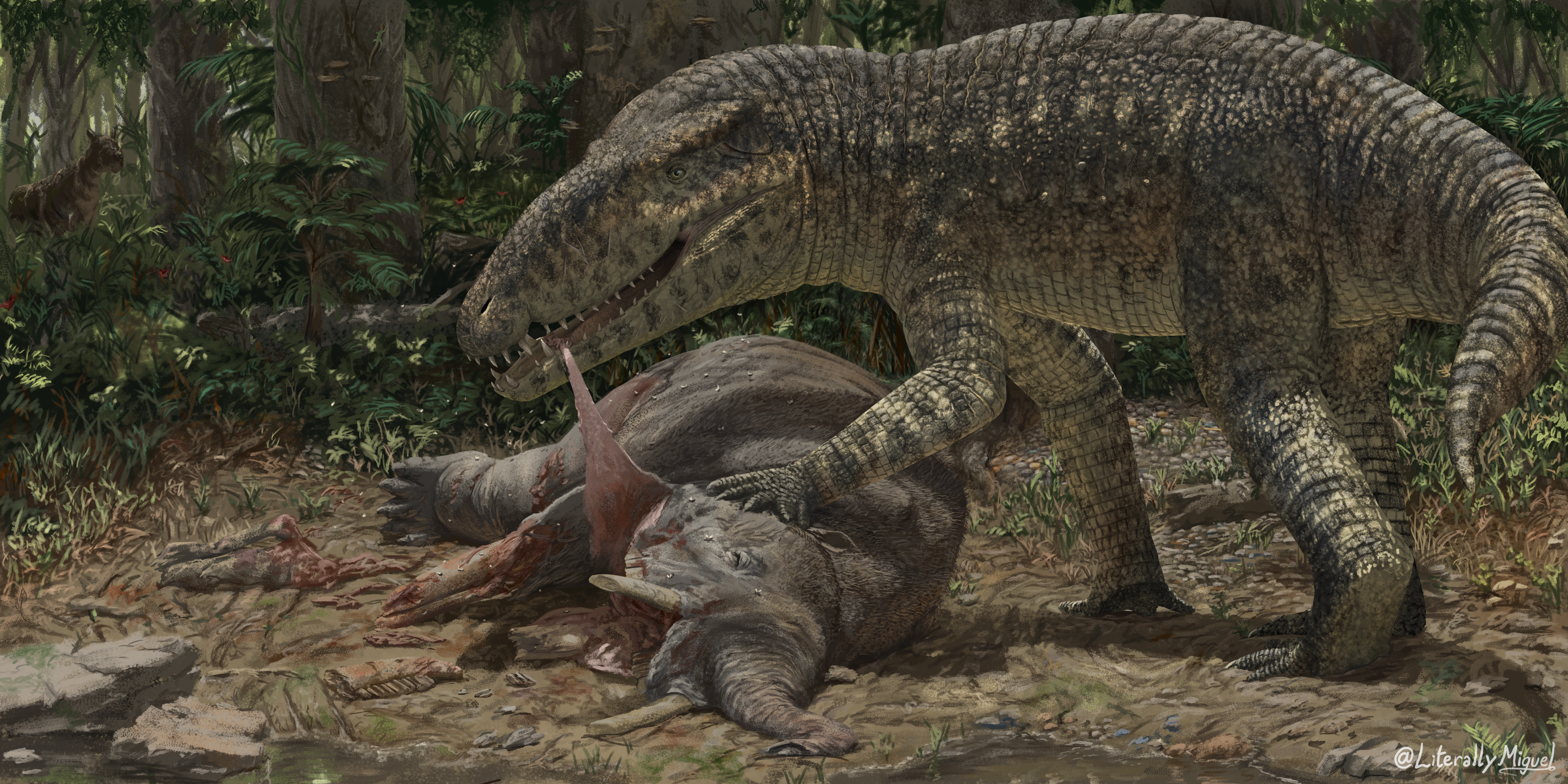
- Artistic depiction of Langstonia scavenging on a Xenastrapotherium carcass, based in serrated bitemarks from the La Venta fossil site

Scientific classification
- Kingdom: Animalia
- Phylum: Chordata
- Class: Reptilia
- Clade: Pseudosuchia
- Clade: Crocodylomorpha
- Clade: †Notosuchia
- Clade: †Sebecia
- Family: †Sebecidae; Simpson, 1937

Subgroups
- †Ayllusuchus; †Barinasuchus; †Bretesuchus; †Dentaneosuchus; †Eremosuchus?; †Ilchunaia?; †Langstonia; †Lorosuchus; †Sahitisuchus; †Sebecus; †Zulmasuchus

Synonyms
- Bretesuchidae Gasparini, Fernandez & Powell, 1993

= Sebecidae =

Sebecids Temporal range: Early Paleocene - Late Miocene/Early Pliocene, 66–4.5 Ma

Extinct family of reptiles

Sebecidae is an extinct family of prehistoric terrestrial sebecosuchian crocodylomorphs, known from the Late Cretaceous and Cenozoic of Europe, South America and the Caribbean. They were the latest surviving group of non-crocodilian crocodylomorphs. Sebecids are colloquially known as land crocodiles.

The oldest known member once attributed to the group is Ogresuchus furatus known from the Upper Cretaceous (Maastrichtian) Tremp Formation (Spain). However, a 2026 study suggested that this taxon more likely represents an atoposaurid. Other records of the group are known from the Eocene of Europe. Sebecids were diverse, abundant and broadly distributed in South America (mostly in Argentina, Brazil and Bolivia) during the Cenozoic, from the Paleocene until the Middle Miocene. The youngest known sebecids identified as cf. Sebecus sp. are reported from the Late Miocene-Early Pliocene strata of the Dominican Republic.

This group included many medium- and large-sized genera, from Sebecus to the giant 6-metre-long (20 ft) Barinasuchus from the Miocene. They are thought to have served as apex terrestrial predators of their ecosystems.

== Phylogeny ==
Juan Leardi and colleagues in 2024 defined Sebecidae in PhyloCode as "the least inclusive clade containing Sebecus icaeorhinus, Bretesuchus bonapartei, Barinasuchus arveloi, and Sahitisuchus fluminensis". The following cladogram simplified after Diego Pol and Jaime E. Powell (2011).

- Sebecosuchia
  - Pehuenchesuchus
  - - Cynodontosuchus
    - Baurusuchidae
      - - Pabwehshi
        - Stratiotosuchus
      - - Baurusuchus pachecoi
        - Baurusuchus salgadoensis
    - - Bergisuchidae
        Bergisuchus
      - Iberosuchidae
        Iberosuchus
      - Sebecidae
        - Lorosuchus
        - - Barinasuchus
          - - - Ayllusuchus
              - Bretesuchus
            - - Lumbrera form
              - Langstonia
              - Sebecus
              - Zulmasuchus
