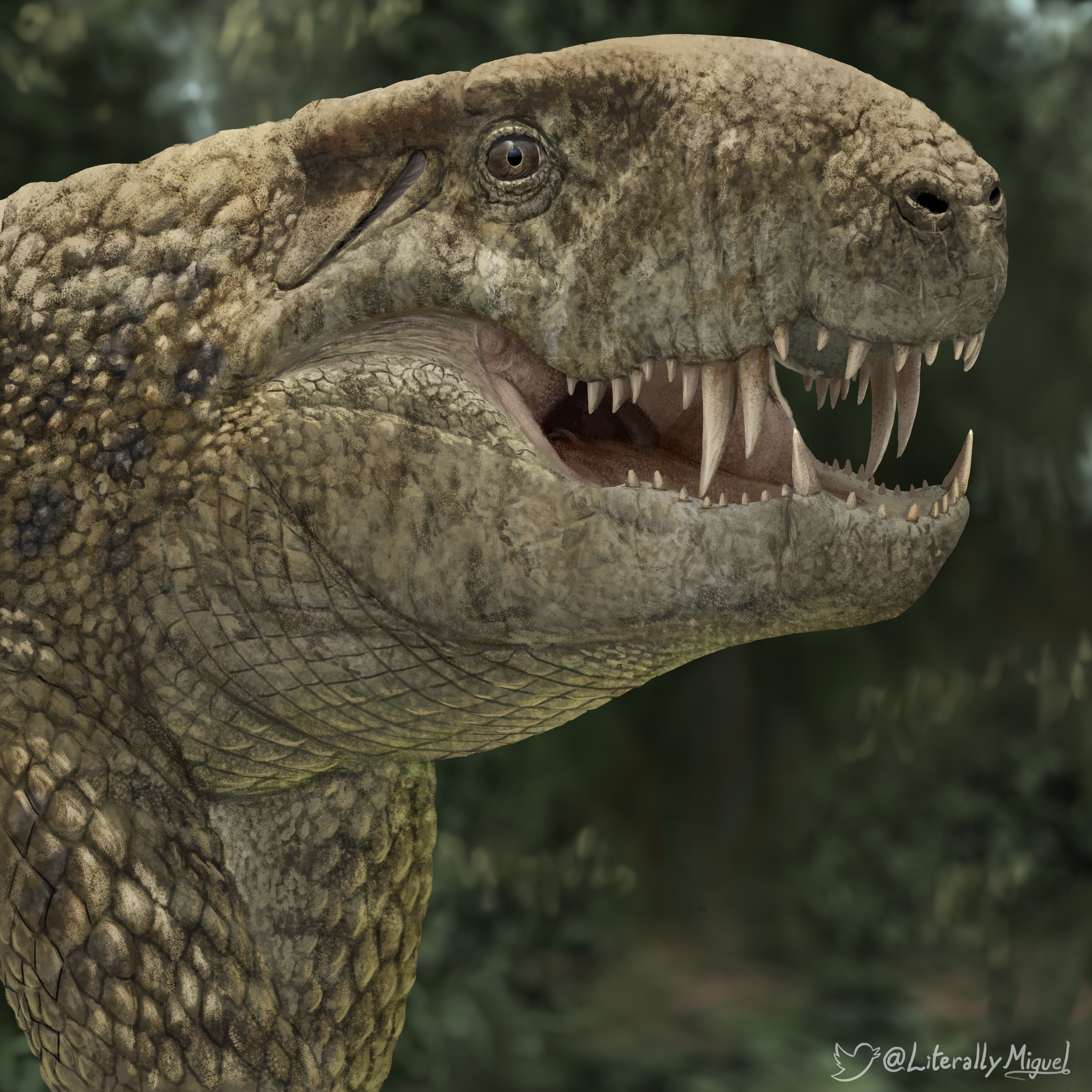
- Life restoration
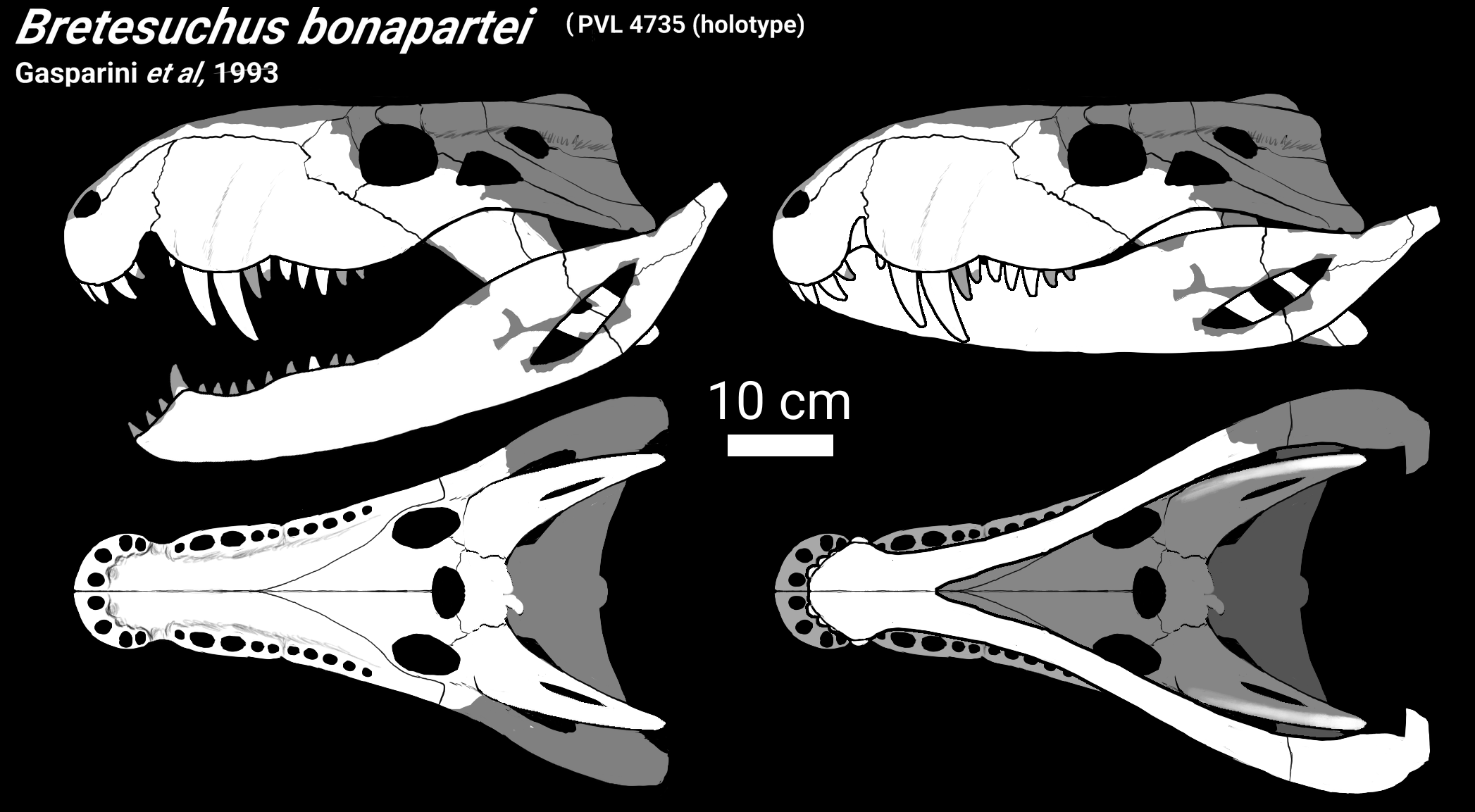
- Skull diagram showcasing preserved elements in white

Scientific classification
- Kingdom: Animalia
- Phylum: Chordata
- Class: Reptilia
- Clade: Pseudosuchia
- Clade: Crocodylomorpha
- Clade: †Notosuchia
- Family: †Sebecidae
- Genus: †Bretesuchus; Gasparini, Fernandez & Powell, 1993

Type species
- †Bretesuchus bonapartei Gasparini et al., 1993

= Bretesuchus =

Bretesuchus Temporal range: Late Paleocene (Itaboraian-Riochican) ~58.7–55.8 Ma

Extinct genus of reptiles

Bretesuchus is an extinct genus of sebecosuchian mesoeucrocodylian within the family Sebecidae known from northwestern Argentina. It was a large apex predator (total length approximately 4 m).

== Discovery ==
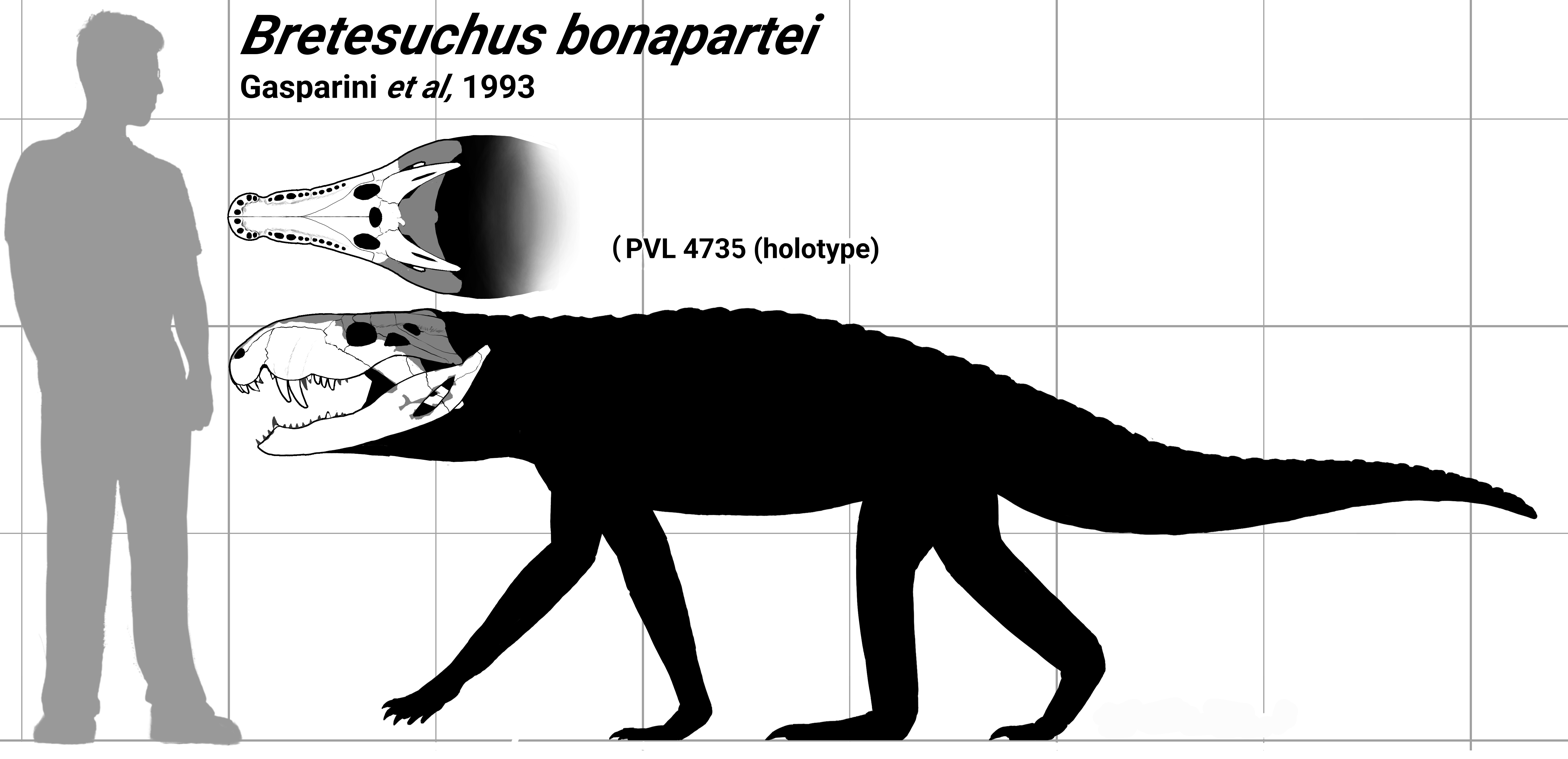
Hypotherical body silhouette based in relatives, compared to a 175cm tall human

Fossils of Bretesuchus have been found in the El Brete locality, from the Maíz Gordo Formation of northwestern Argentina and date back to the Thanetian stage of the late Palaeocene, about 58.7-55.8 million years ago. The highly bent premaxilla shows that it lies within the suborder Sebecosuchia, a group of mostly South American terrestrial carnivorous crocodylomorphs with distinctive laterally compressed snouts. Bretesuchus was originally assigned to its own family, the Bretesuchidae which was found to be the sister group of Sebecus. In 2007, a species of Sebecus, S. querejazus from the Early Paleocene Santa Lucia Formation in Bolivia, was reclassified as a bretesuchid. It was given its own genus, Zulmasuchus. However, recent phylogenetic analyses found Bretesuchidae to nest deeply within Sebecidae, and thus to be synonymous with it. Zulmasuchus was found to be closely related to Sebecus, as originally had been proposed.

== Etymology ==
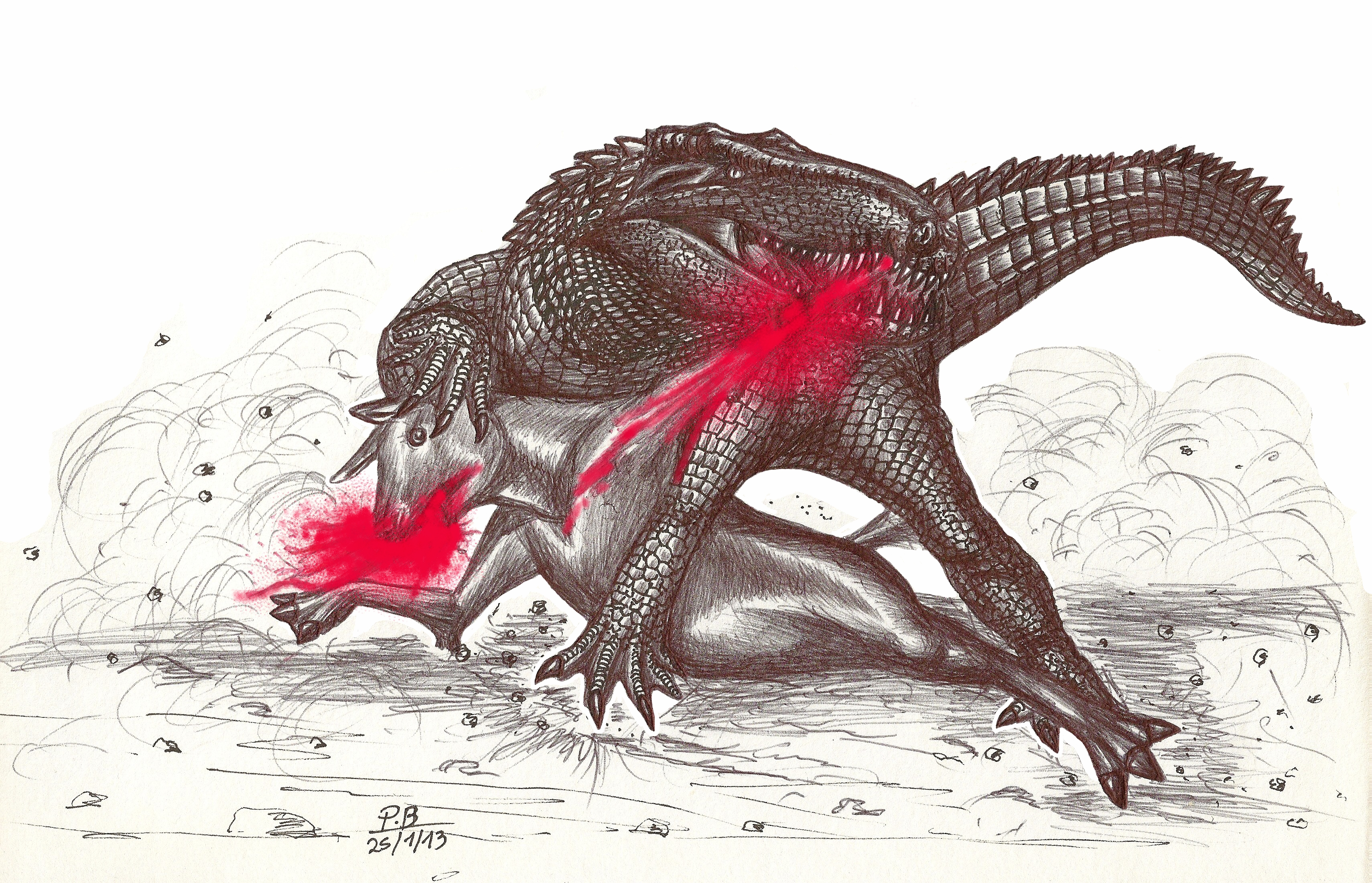
Bretesuchus capturing an hypothetical notoungulate.

Bretesuchus was named by Zulma Gasparini, Marta Fernandez and Jaime E. Powell in 1993 and the type species is Bretesuchus bonapartei. The generic name refers to the "El Brete" locality, where the fossil remains were found, and suchus, Latinized from the Greek souchos, an Egyptian crocodile god. The specific name honors Jose Bonaparte.
