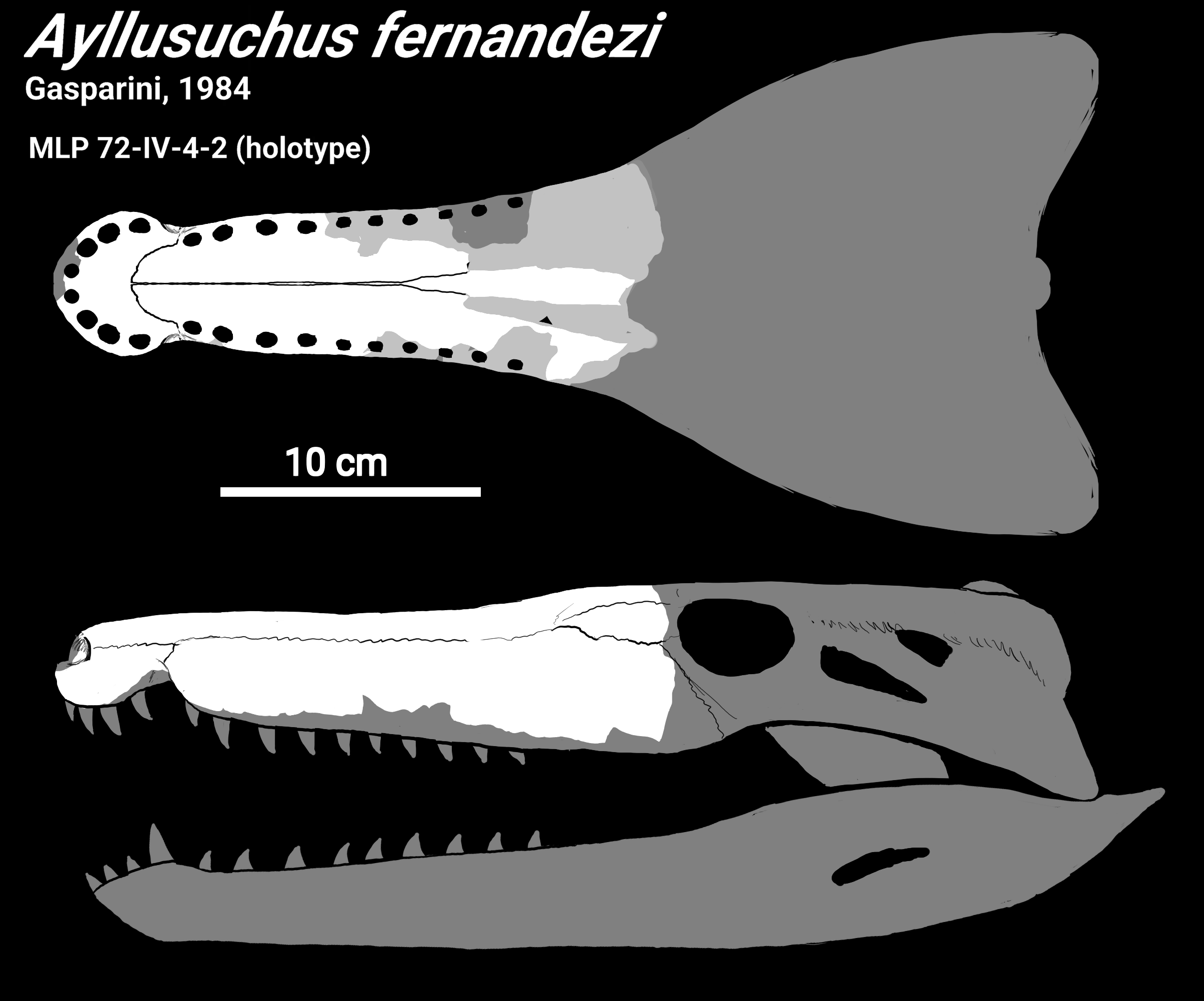
- Skull diagram showing preserved remains white

Scientific classification
- Kingdom: Animalia
- Phylum: Chordata
- Class: Reptilia
- Clade: Pseudosuchia
- Clade: Crocodylomorpha
- Clade: †Notosuchia
- Family: †Sebecidae
- Genus: †Ayllusuchus; Gasparini, 1984

Species
- A. fernandezi Gasparini, 1984 (type)

= Ayllusuchus =

Ayllusuchus Temporal range: Early-Late Eocene (Casamayoran) ~48 Ma

Extinct genus of reptiles

Ayllusuchus is an extinct genus of medium-sized sebecid mesoeucrocodylian. Fossils have been found in the Lumbrera Formation of Argentina (Eocene age, Casamayoran). It possessed a relatively long and low snout compared to other sebecids.
