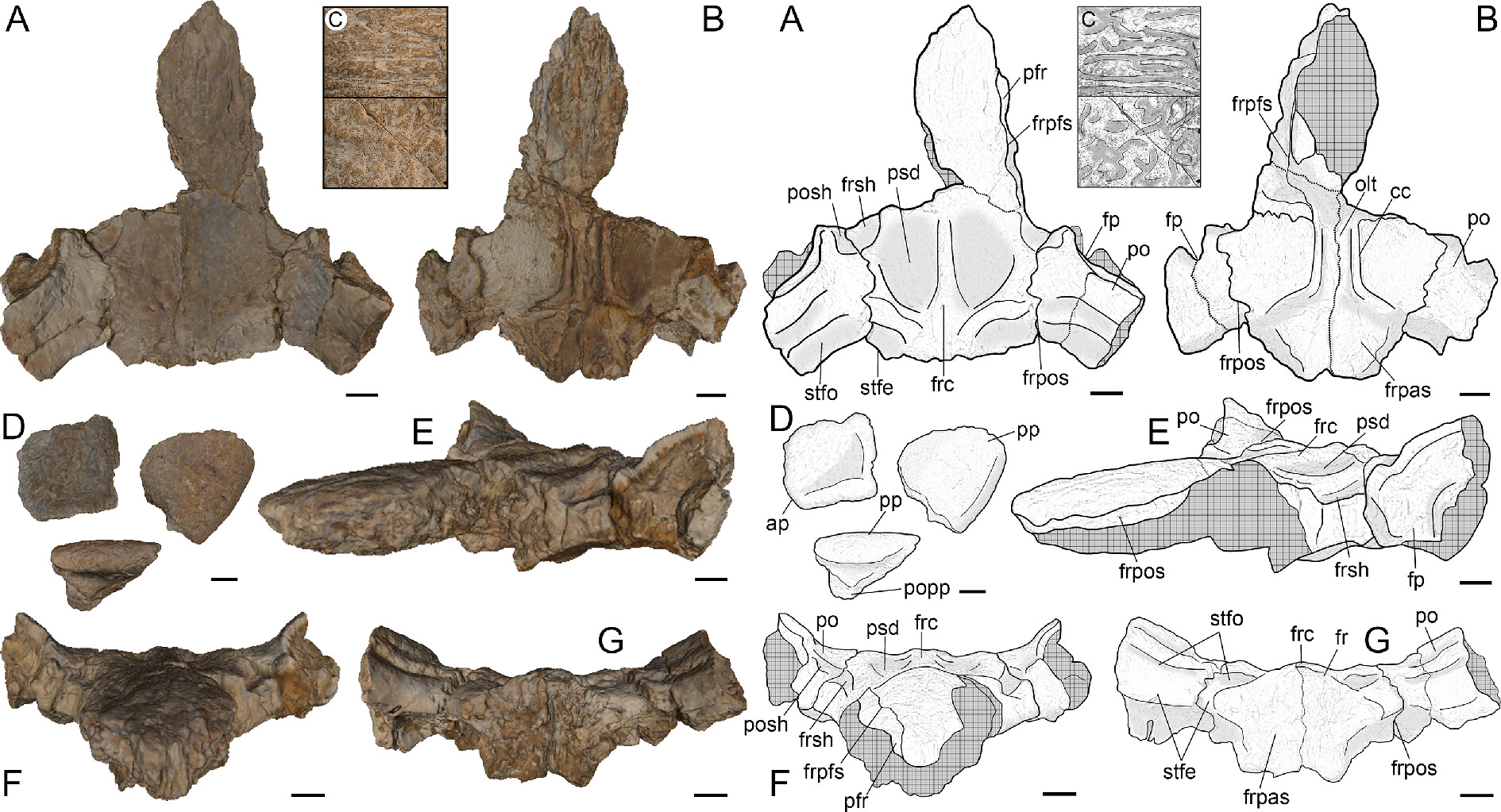
- The holotype material of Tewkensuchus
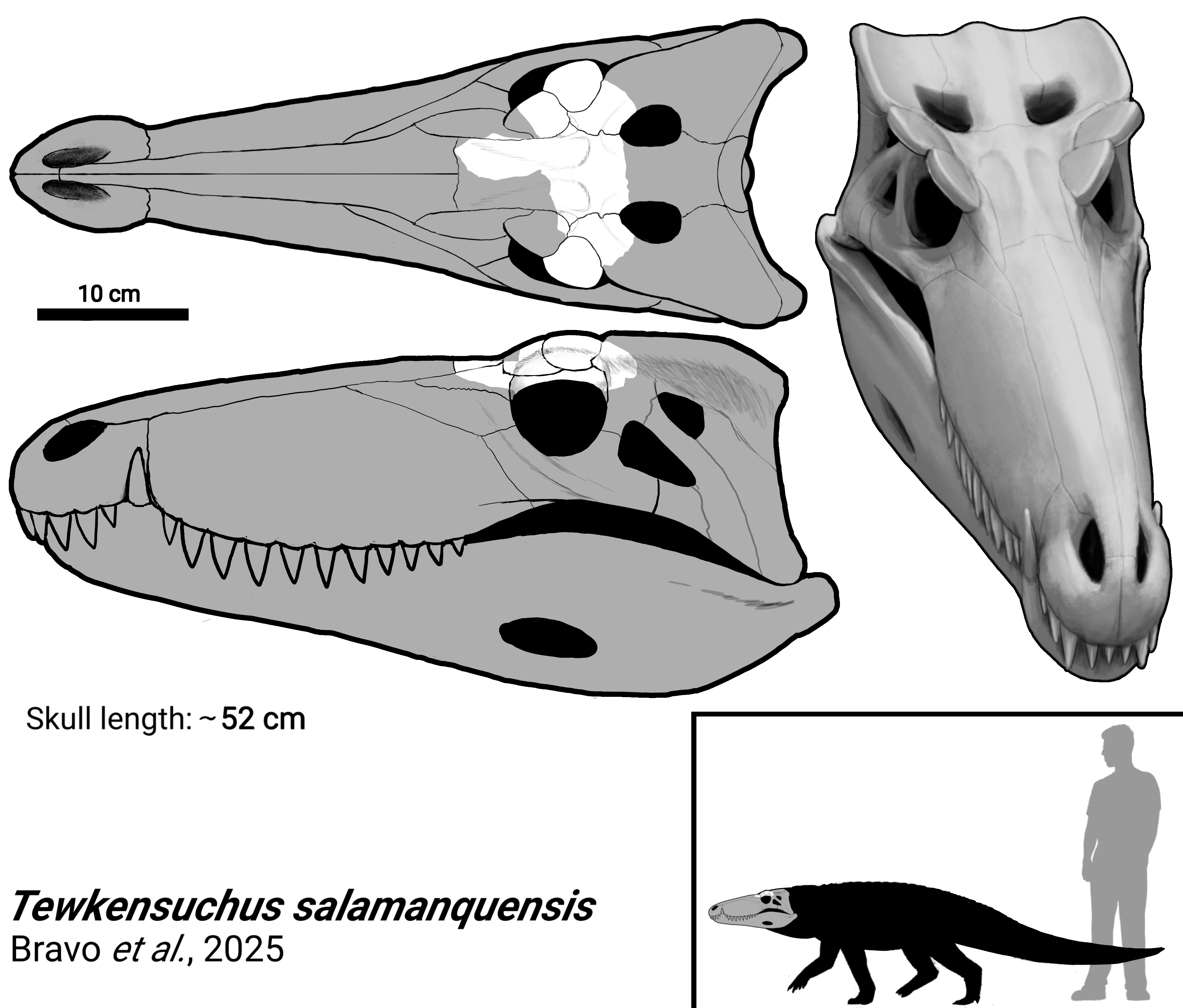
- Skull reconstruction and size comparizon of Tewkensuchus

Scientific classification
- Kingdom: Animalia
- Phylum: Chordata
- Class: Reptilia
- Clade: Pseudosuchia
- Clade: Crocodylomorpha
- Clade: †Notosuchia
- Genus: †Tewkensuchus; Bravo et al., 2025
- Species: †T. salamanquensis

Binomial name
- †Tewkensuchus salamanquensis Bravo et al., 2025

= Tewkensuchus =

Tewkensuchus Temporal range: Early Paleocene 63.8–63.2 Ma

Genus of reptile

Tewkensuchus ("forehead crocodile") is an extinct genus of large-bodied sebecoid notosuchian from the Paleocene of Argentina. The genus was described on the basis of fragmentary skull remains alongside a few vertebrae and finger bones collected from the Salamanca Formation. Though likely a terrestrial predator akin to genera like Sebecus, Tewkensuchus much more closely resembles European forms such as Iberosuchus, Bergisuchus and Dentaneosuchus. These European genera form a clade with Tewkensuchus, which appears to be the sister group to the Sebecidae of South America, with both groups being placed in the clade Sebecoidea. Gonzalo Gabriel Bravo and colleagues furthermore note the great size of the animal, which based on its estimated skull length may have weighed around 300 kg (660 lb), not only making it larger than the largest definitive sebecosuchians of the Cretaceous but also putting it far above the maximum weight generally assumed for terrestrial species that survive the Cretaceous–Paleogene extinction event. Possible explanations for this unusually large size might be that the ancestors of Tewkensuchus and other sebecoids could have been more semi-aquatic than their descendents or that they were terrestrial and simply grew rapidly following the extinction of the dinosaurs.

== History and naming ==
The fossil remains of Tewkensuchus were discovered during field campaigns that took place in 2008 and 2022 in the Punta Peligro area of Argentina's Chubut Province. The material stems from sediments assigned to the Salamanca Formation, which dates to the Danian stage of the Paleocene, making the fossils approximately 63 million years old.

The name Tewkensuchus is derived from the Tehuelche word "t'ewk'en" or "t'ewq'en", which translates to "forehead", a word specifically chosen to reference the unique anatomy of the animal's frontal bone. As often in fossil crocodyliforms, the second part of the name is composed of the word "suchus", derived from the Ancient Greek word "soukhos", itself taken from the Egyptian crocodile-headed god Sobek, who is also namesake of the clades Sebecoidea and Sebecosuchia.

== Description ==
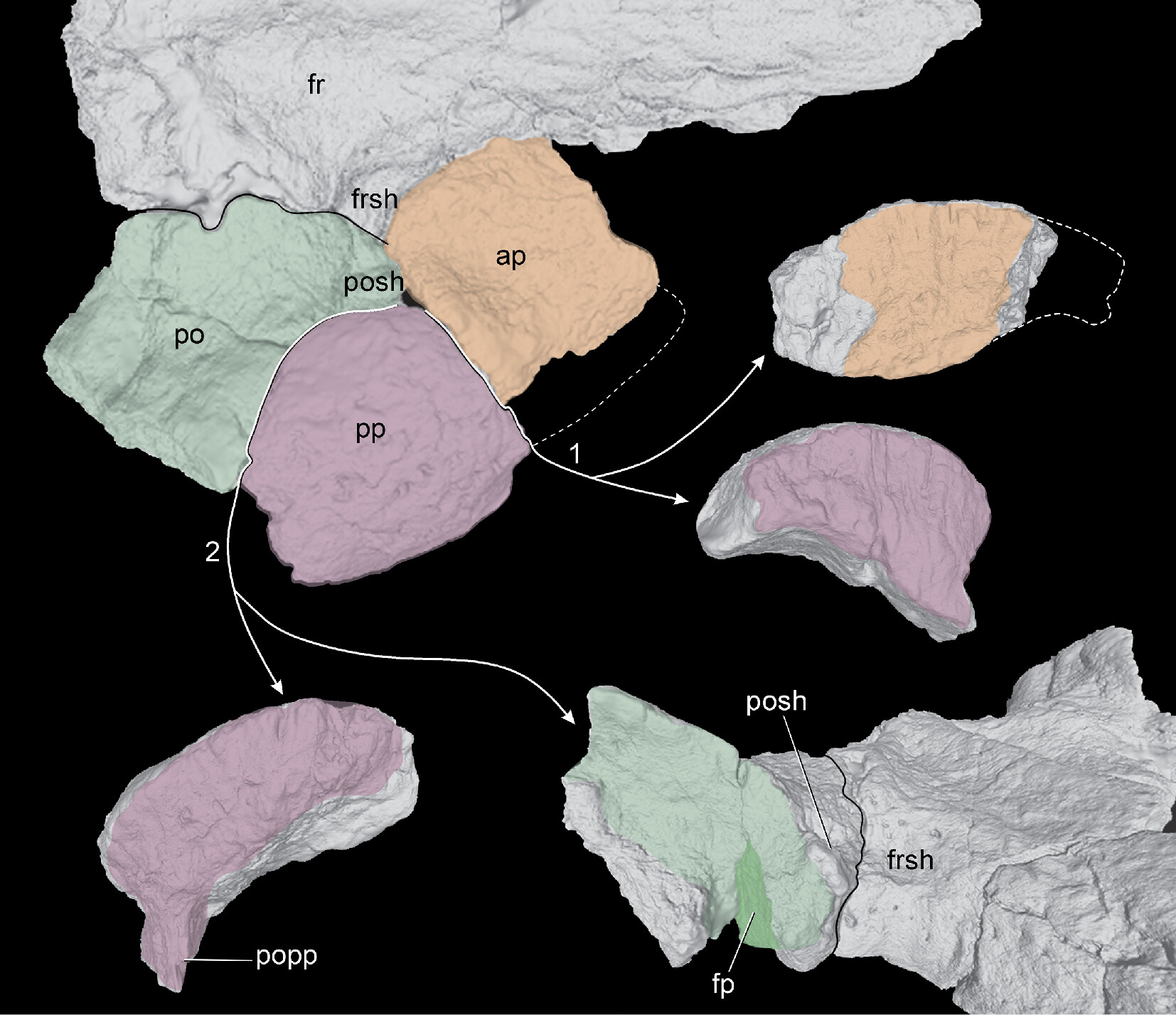
Articulation of the skull bones of Tewkensuchus

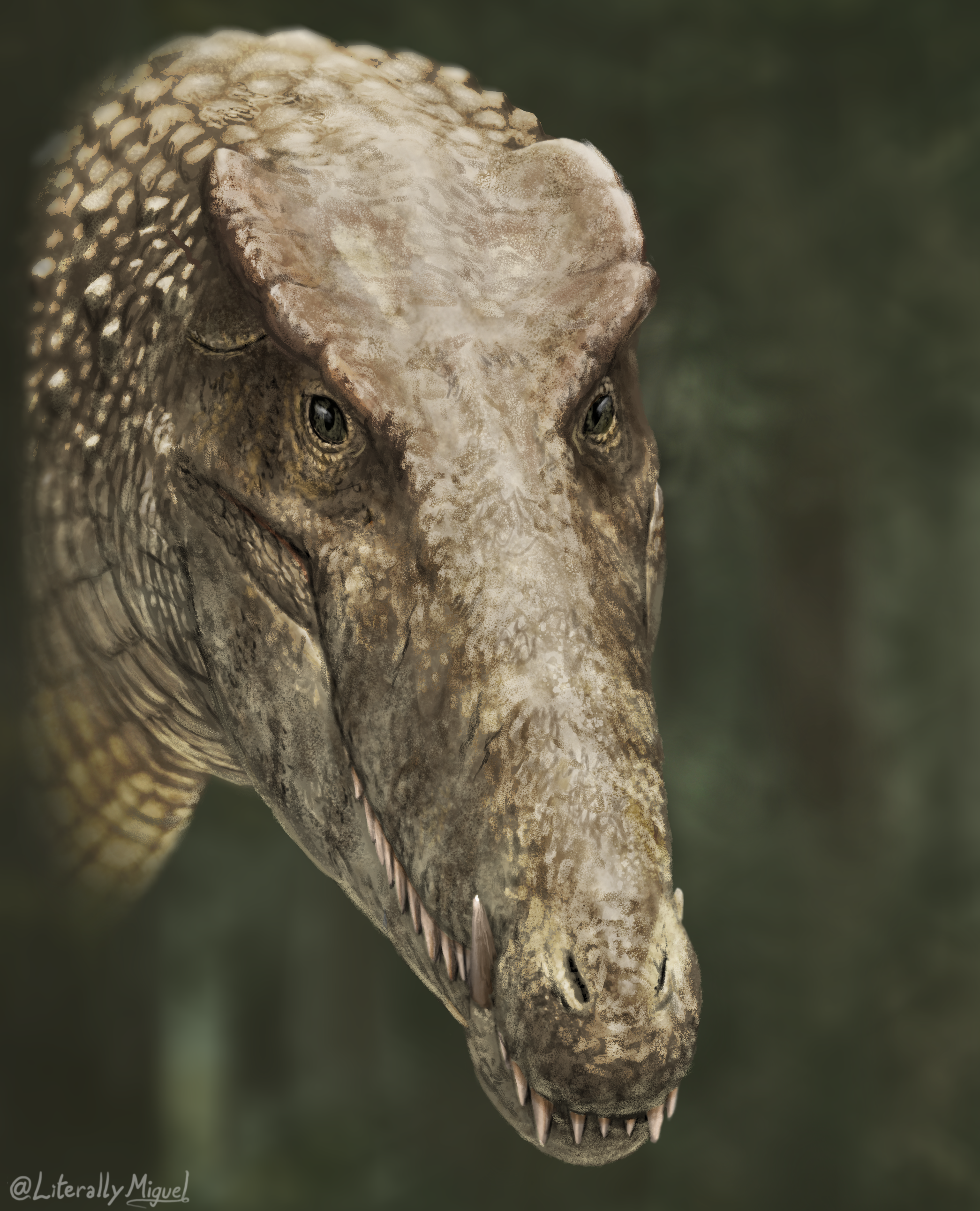
Life restoration

Tewkensuchus is only known from fragmentary remains, primarily parts of the skull roof and a few postcranial remains. The skull remains are represented primarily by a frontal bone and the connected postorbitals and palpebrals as well as part of a prefrontal. As in all mesoeucrocodylians, the frontal is a single fused element that occupies the space between the eyesockets and forms the front of the skull table. The frontal is dominated by two broad depressions located on either side of a sagittal crest, which is similar to what can be seen in certain baurusuchids and the European sebecosuchians Dentaneosuchus and Iberosuchus. The sagittal crest is described as broad and high, which actually serves to set Tewkensuchus apart from the related sebecids of South America, whose sagittal crests are generally described as narrow and ridge-like, though their height may vary between species. The overall ornamentation of the frontal's surface is also regarded as being diagnostic for Tewkensuchus, beginning as pronounced subparallel grooves at the anterior (front) end of the bone and transitioning to shallower grooves with less clear orientation and length further towards the back.

While relatively narrow in the front, the frontal bone rapidly expands towards its posterior section where it contacts the postorbitals to either side, effectively creating a 90° angle at the inner corner of the eyesockets. Prior to contacting the postorbital, the frontal bears a prominent semicircular shelf that is recessed from the rest of the bones surface and continues onto the adjacent part of the postorbital. This depression has been noted to resemble a similar structure also present in the postorbitals of other notosuchians such as sphagesaurids, peirosaurids and uruguaysuchids. However, unlike in these groups and like in the European Iberosuchus the depression is not overlapped by the palpebral. Another notable feature visible at the anterior edge is the presence of a high vertical facet that, due to its concave morphology, serves to articulate with the slightly convex posterior palpebral bone. Towards the lower middle of this facet, the postorbital bears a narrow socket, a counterpart to the peg-like structure present on the corresponding palpebral. Such a peg and socket articulation is unique to Tewkensuchus among crocodyliforms in their entirety. Yet another feature of the postorbital noted by the team naming Tewkensuchus is their overall orientation relative to the rest of the skull table. Typically in crocodyliforms, the skull table is a flattened element with an overall even horizontal surface. However, in Tewkensuchus the postorbitals display a clear incline relative to the surface of the frontal, meaning that the outer edges of the postorbitals are positioned higher than the rest of the known skull table.

Two palpebrals would have been located above either eye of Tewkensuchus, one subquadrangular anterior palpebral (although its true shape remains unknown due to the damage suffered by the holotype) and one more triangular posterior palpebral that would articulate with the postorbital via the sock and peg articulation.

=== Dentition ===
Tooth bearing fragments of the snout and an isolated tooth are known from the holotype of Tewkensuchus, showing that its dentition seemingly differed noticeably from that of sebecids. The tooth crown is described as conical and its inner (labial) and outer (lingual) surfaces as convex, with a sharp carina formed by the medial and distal edges of the crown. This means that though the teeth possessed a sharp cutting edge, they were not ziphodont as they lack the serrations and the sideways compression seen in sebecids like Sebecus.

=== Postcranial remains ===
Some postcranial remains are also known from Tewkensuchus, though they are incomplete and badly damaged. The holotype included six neck vertebrae, 14 phalanges including 6 representing the very tip of their respective finger or toe and finally eight tail vertebrae.

=== Size ===
Though no complete skulls are known, Bravo and colleagues estimated the skull length (dorsal cranial length or DCL) based on the length of the frontal bone, which in sebecids strongly correlates with the length of the skull as a whole. Based on this, the skull of Tewkensuchus is estimated to have measured up to 520 mm (20 in) in length, just over half a meter. Assuming that the relation between skull length and body mass in sebecoids is similar to what is seen in modern crocodilians renders a weight of around 300 kg (660 lb) for Tewkensuchus. This would imply that the animal was larger than even the largest known baurusuchid, which was Stratiotosuchus at 280 kg (620 lb), as well as the largest known members of Peirosauria. While this is lower than what has been estimated for the largest known sebecoids, Barinasuchus and Dentaneosuchus with 500 kg (1,100 lb) and 700 kg (1,500 lb) respectively, it still makes Tewkensuchus a lot larger than some of the smaller sebecoids such as Lorosuchus with an estimated weight of 23 kg (51 lb) or Sebecus ayrampu with less than 30 kg (66 lb) in weight.

== Phylogeny ==
Though fragmentary in nature, the fossil material of Tewkensuchus nonetheless gives a good idea of how it is related to other crocodyliforms, making it clear that the animal was not a eusuchian but rather had close ties with the terrestrial family Sebecidae. All phylogenetic trees recovered by the type description support a close relationship between sebecids and the similarly terrestrial members of Baurusuchidae, together known as Sebecosuchia, therefore going against the idea that sebecids were actually relatives of peirosaurids, forming the clade Sebecia.

Tewkensuchus itself was found to be most closely related to a variety of European species generally thought of as close kin to South American sebecids, namely the genera Iberosuchus from Spain, Dentaneosuchus from France and Bergisuchus from Germany. While the anatomical characters that define this clade of European sebecosuchians are either modified or not visible in Tewkensuchus, the relationship is inferred on the basis of some features of the frontal that are shared between Tewkensuchus and Iberosuchus. The poorly understood Eremosuchus from Northern Africa may have also been part of this group, though the scrappy nature of its remains means that it is regarded as being unstable by the research team conducting the analysis. While this "Eurogondwanan clade", as the grouping is referred to by Gonzalo Gabriel Bravo and colleagues, contains genera that have at times been placed within Sebecidae itself, the team reasons that separating these genera from proper sebecids would be more in line with the taxonomy used in previous studies. Given that the "Eurogondwanan clade" is still closely related to the Sebecidae, the clade Sebecoidea was erected to encompass both groups.

- Pabwehshi
- Sebecosuchia
  - Baurusuchidae
  - Sebecoidea
    - Ogresuchus
    - - - Dentaneosuchus
        - Bergisuchus
        - Tewkensuchus
        - Iberosuchus
      - Sebecidae
        - - Ayllusuchus
          - Bretesuchus
        - - Barinasuchus
          - - Sebecus icaeorhinus
            - Sebecus ayrampu
            - Lumbrera Form
            - Sebecus querejazus
            - Sebecus huilensis

== Evolutionary implications ==
The large size and unique phylogenetic position of Tewkensuchus add additional questions to the already uncertain dispersal and origins of Cenozoic sebecosuchians. Within the phylogenetic analysis of Bravo and colleagues, Tewkensuchus was found to be closely related with Dentaneosuchus, Iberosuchus and Bergisuchus. Problematically however, all three of these are known from the Eocene of Europe, whereas Tewkensuchus comes from the lowermost Paleocene of South America, showing a significant geographic divide. This is further complicated by the fact that though all proper sebecids come from the Cenozoic of South America, closer to Tewkensuchus, the basalmost member of Sebecoidea, Ogresuchus, comes from the latest Cretaceous of Spain. Excluding unlikely routes of dispersal via North America or the Atlantic leaves Africa as the likeliest route of dispersal for these animals. Given that baurusuchids first appear during the Santonian in South America, it has been presumed that sebecoids would logically date back to the Santonian as well given their status as sister groups. It is possible that sebecoids could have dispersed from South America into Africa, with the lack of sebecoid fossils from the latter being explained by insufficient sampling, and from there entered Europe during times of low sea levels as was the case for various groups of dinosaurs. This could explain the presence of sebecoids in the Cretaceous of Europe as well as the Cenozoic of South America and Europe, though a much more recent origin and dispersal for the group is not discounted.

Another aspect concerns not the origins and diversification of Sebecoidea itself but rather the group's survival across the Cretaceous-Paleogene extinction event. Notosuchians seem to have experienced two major instances of size increase, once within the clade Peirosauria and a second time within Sebecosuchia, which reached weights of up to 280 kg (620 lb) during the Late Cretaceous. Additionally, the results of Bravo et al. (2025) suggest additional size increase that took place at the base of Sebecoidea, with the optimized body mass of the group across the KPG boundary lying in a range of 332–443 kg (732–977 lb), and additional growth leading to especially large taxa like Barinasuchus (estimated to weigh 500 kg (1,100 lb) by the team) and Dentaneosuchus (with an estimated weight of 700 kg (1,500 lb)) as well as some instances of size decrease. This is significant in that it is generally believed that no terrestrial animal over ~5–10 kg (11–22 lb) survived the asteroid impact and its consequences. This estimate however would be far exceeded and contradicted by sebecoids retaining a large body-size across the boundary, even when assuming that the southern hemisphere would have been less drastically affected by the event. Bravo and colleagues propose two hypothetical scenarios in which the body-size selected extinction of land animals and the large optimized size of sebecoids could be true at the same time. Scenario one poses that it is possible that sebecoids could have been more aquatic around the time of the impact, only to take on a more terrestrial ecology following the extinction of the highly specialized baurusuchids. Being semi-aquatic is known to at least somewhat circumvent the restrictions imposed on land animals, as multiple semi-aquatic and even aquatic lineages of crocodyliforms managed to survive the mass extinction. However, this hypothesis would be more in line with the Sebecia-hypothesis, which suggests that sebecids are not closely related to baurusuchids but instead allied with peirosaurids, a topology not supported by the results of Bravo et al. (2025). The second potential scenario suggests that the great size recovered for sebecoids across the KPG boundary is primarily coloured by the size of the group's members during the Cenozoic, and that their ancestor that actually survived the event could have been more similar in size to Ogresuchus. This hypothesis goes on to suggest that if deriving from small ancestors, sebecoids must have grown rapidly following the extinction of the dinosaurs, reaching weights of up to 300 kg (660 lb) just a few million years after the mass extinction. However, Bravo and colleagues maintain that a large body-size for sebecoids across the boundary is still the most parsimonious interpretation.

== Paleobiology ==
Tewkensuchus lived during the earliest Paleocene, approximately 63 million years ago, in what is now the Salamanca Formation of Patagonia. More specifically, the fossils come from the locality of Punta Peligro, which is located in the uppermost part of the formation known as the Banco Negro Inferior. The paleoenvironment of the Banco Negro Inferior is generally interpreted as poorly drained and low energy setting, possibly a coastal mangrove forest, flooded forest or a swamp, with the presence of coalified debris suggesting the presence of freshwater. The climate is described as subtropical and humid, as evidenced by the abundant turtle and crocodilian remains in addition to Tewkensuchus, which further fit the interpretation of a swampy biome being present. The vegetation is described as forested and older members of the Salamanca Formation are well known for their flora. The Estancia Las Violetes locality for example has been shown to have been covered by mixed forests featuring palms (Arecaceae) that were ultimately dominated by conifers such as podocarps and cypress trees.

Punta Peligran is well known for its vertebrate fauna, which featured a variety of amphibians, reptiles and mammals. Among the more archaic mammal lineages were meridiolestidans like Peligrotherium, gondwanatheres like Sudamerica and the platypus-like monotreme Monotrematum. Metatherians were also present via ameridelphians, sparassodonts and polydolopimorphians while placentals are represented by some of the earliest South American native ungulates including didolodontids and litopternans. The herpetofauna consists of leptodactylid, calyptocephalellid and pipid frogs and toads, chelid and meiolaniform turtles, members of sphenacodontia and other crocodyliforms in the form of caimans such as Eocaiman and Protocaiman, with a third form, Necrosuchus, found in a lower member of the Salamanca Formation.

Like other sebecosuchians, Tewkensuchus is thought to have been a largely terrestrial hypercarnivorous predator, though it and sebecoids as a whole may have been less specialized than the similarly adapted baurusuchids, who differ in part due to having a noticeably reduced number of teeth.
