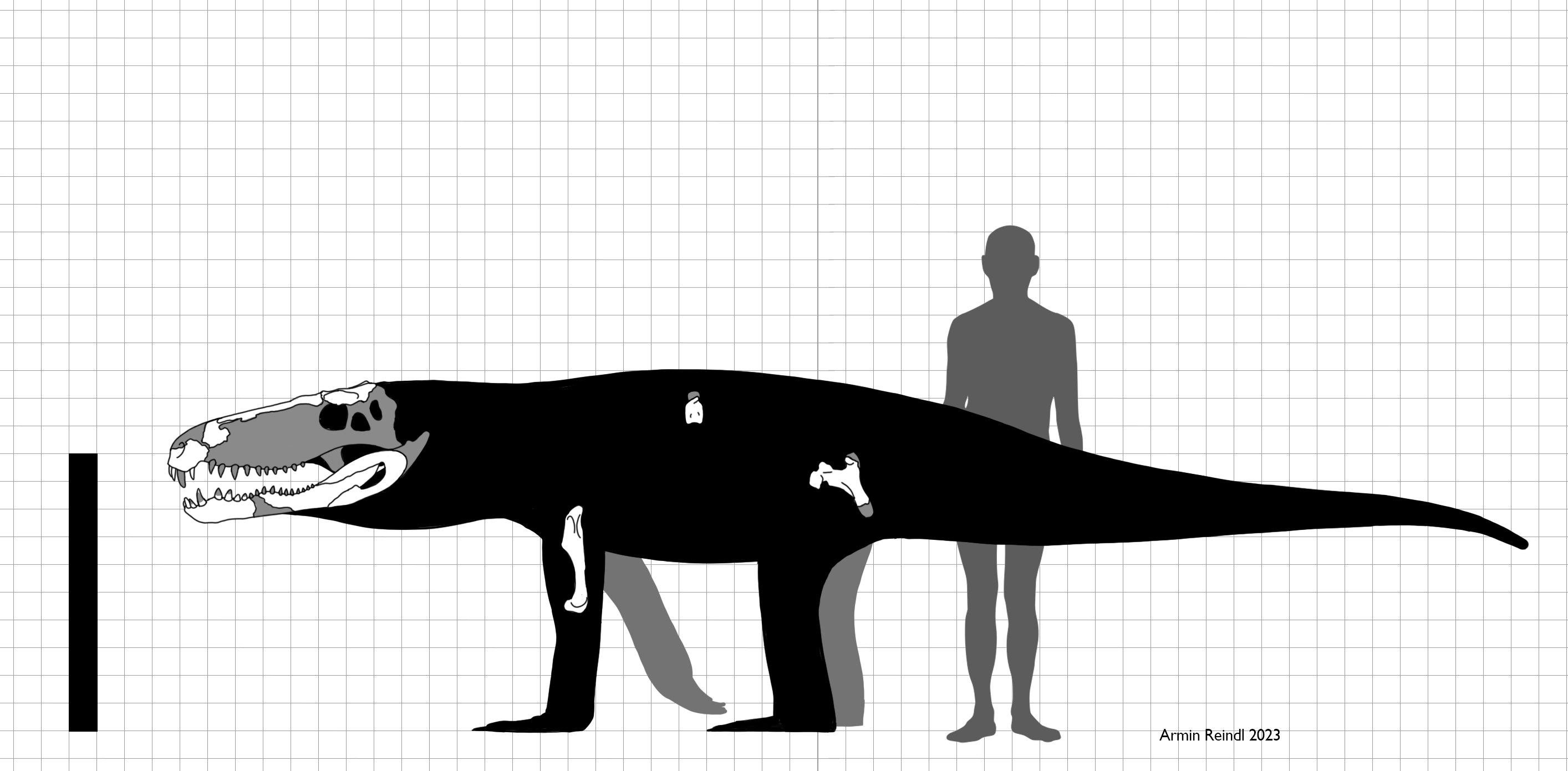
- Reconstruction based on the material from Réalmont (scalebar = 1m)

Scientific classification
- Kingdom: Animalia
- Phylum: Chordata
- Class: Reptilia
- Clade: Archosauria
- Clade: Pseudosuchia
- Clade: Crocodylomorpha
- Clade: †Notosuchia
- Family: †Sebecidae
- Genus: †Dentaneosuchus; Martin et al., 2023

Type species
- †Atacisaurus crassiproratus Astre, 1931

Species
- †D. crassiproratus (Astre, 1931)

Synonyms
- Atacisaurus crassiproratus Astre, 1931; Iberosuchus crassiproratus (Godinot et al., 2018)

= Dentaneosuchus =

Dentaneosuchus Temporal range: Middle Eocene, Bartonian

Extinct genus of reptiles

Dentaneosuchus is a genus of large bodied sebecid crocodylomorph from the Middle Eocene of Issel and Réalmont (France). Originally described as Atacisaurus crassiproratus, the discovery of additional remains led to it being placed in a separate genus in 2023. It was tentatively recovered as the basalmost member of the family Sebecidae. Because of this Dentaneosuchus could play an important part in deciphering the origins and dispersal of European sebecids, as their presence on the continent, far away from their primary range in South America, is still not entirely resolved. It reached a similar size to the enormous Barinasuchus, making it not only one of the biggest sebecids but also the biggest terrestrial carnivore of Cenozoic Europe. Dentaneosuchus would have been an apex predator of its environment, capable of taking large prey such as Lophiodon. However, for as of yet unknown reasons crocodylomorphs would lose their spot as top predator in this part of the world by the end of the Eocene, with Dentaneosuchus representing one of the last members of its group in Europe.

== History and naming ==
The first fossil of Dentaneosuchus, a mandibular symphysis catalogued as specimen MHNT.PAL.2006.0.53., was discovered in the Sables du Castrais Formation near Issel in southern France and assigned to the genus Atacisaurus by Gaston Astre in 1931, creating the name Atacisaurus crassiproratus. When describing Iberosuchus in 1975, Miguel Telles Antunes considered the possibility that the Issel remains may have belonged to the same animal, tentatively referring the symphysis to his new genus, and Ortega et al. (1996) agreed with this placement.

In 2018 Godinot and colleagues went as far as to fully place the specimen in Iberosuchus while retaining the species name, creating the new combination Iberosuchus crassiproratus. However, the referral of various European sebecid specimens to Iberosuchus was at times done under less than ideal conditions, as much of the material didn't overlap and the assignment was in large parts based on very few characters not exclusive to the genus. Excavations in France meanwhile continued to yield sebecid material, including specimens discovered in 1997 near Réalmont. It is possible that this specimen was a once nearly complete skull, however, it was damaged during the dig, with much associated material being gathered from the surrounding debris. Despite this a lot of material could be gathered regardless, which remain in the collection of the Muséum de Toulouse until the fossils were studied by Martin and colleagues.

Martin et al. compared the Réalmont material with both Iberosuchus and the Issel symphysis, determining that there were no differences between the mandibular remains from the two localities yet clear deviations from Iberosuchus macrodon. As the Issel material had been validly described and diagnosed in 1931, the species name could be retained, however the matter of the genus name was more complicated. When naming Atacisaurus, Astre declared A. glarea the type species, but in the following years the holotype had been lost and available figures failed to show any diagnostic traits. Material previously assigned to Atacisaurus glarea meanwhile was initially considered to serve as a lectotype, but lacked shared features with the lost material and was instead found to have belonged to a gavialoid then named Kentisuchus astrei. This rendered Atacisaurus a nomen dubium, leading Martin and colleagues to coin a new genus name for A. crassiproratus, Dentaneosuchus.

The name Dentaneosuchus derives from the Latin "dentaneo", which roughly translates to "showing teeth" or "frightfull" in allusion to its hypothesized role as apex predator, and the Greek "souchos" meaning crocodile, derived from the name of the Egyption deity Sobek.

== Description ==
=== Skull ===
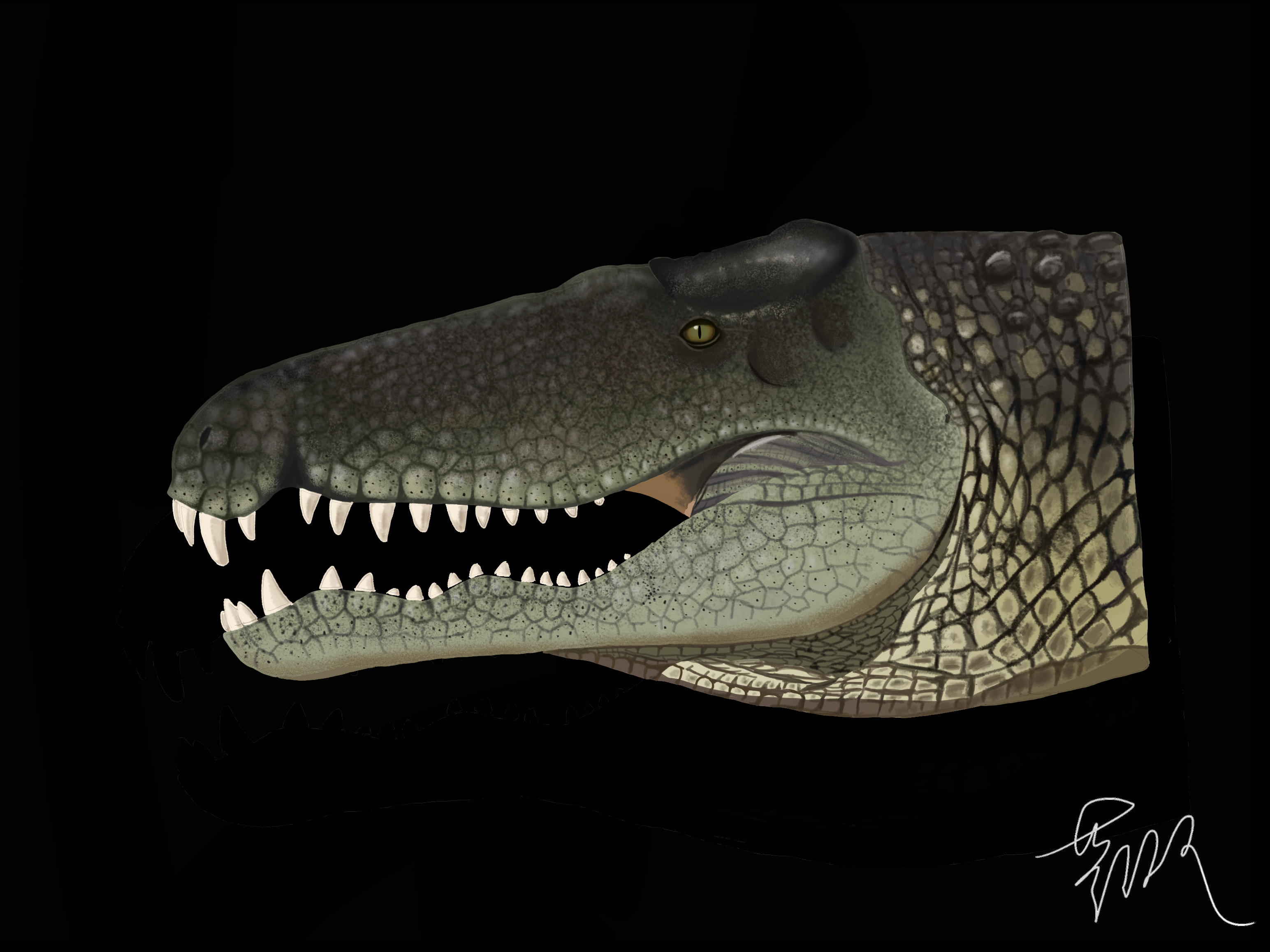
Life restoration of D. crassiproratus

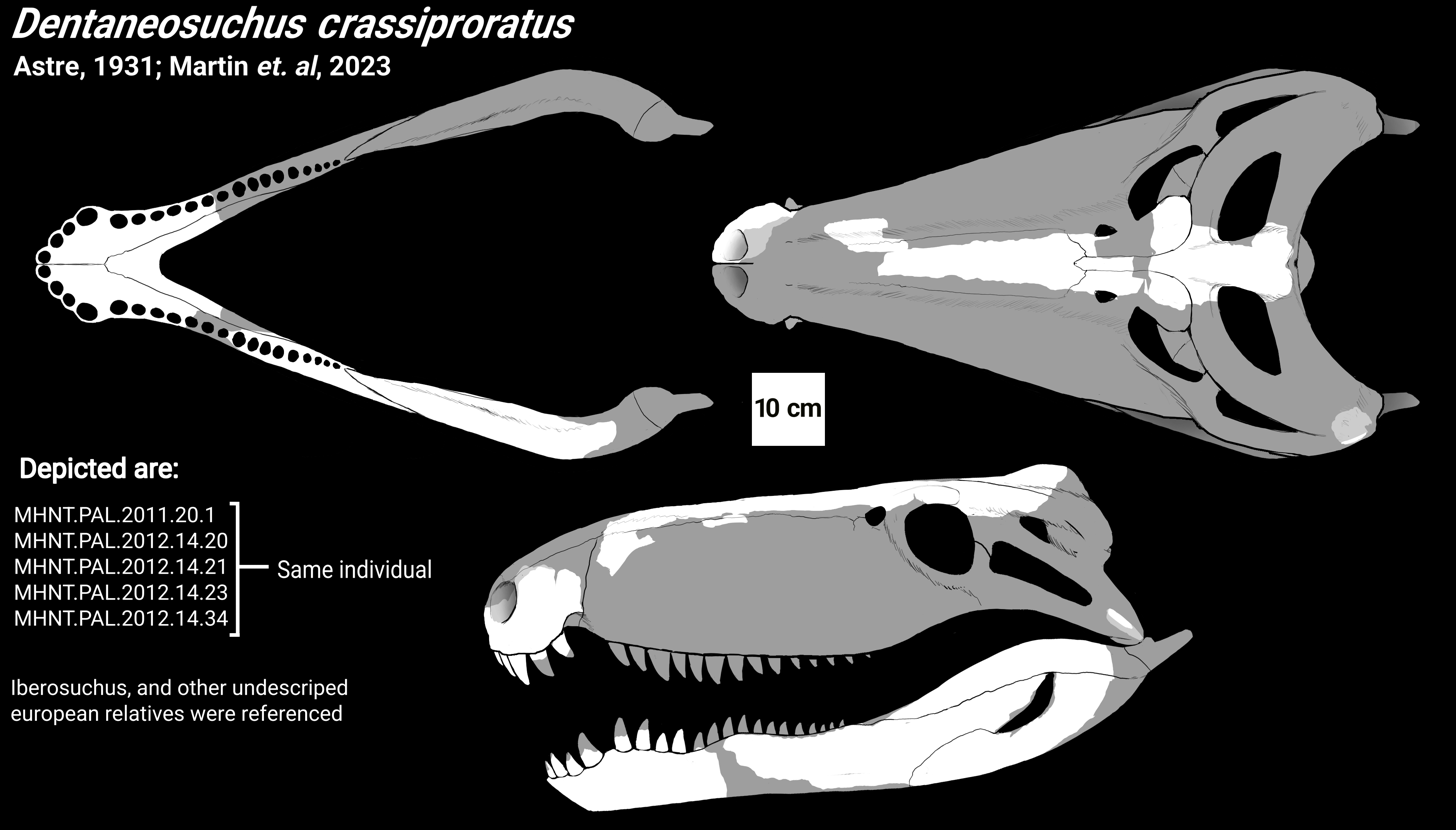
Skull diagram of one Dentaneosuchus specimen, known bones in white

The skull of Dentaneosuchus was altirostral, meaning that unlike in modern crocodilians, it was higher than it was wide. This is clearly shown by the preserved premaxilla. The nares are preserved in the form of two narial openings separated by processes of the premaxilla and nasal bone that meet in the middle. They, like the skull, are higher than wide and face forward. The premaxilla contains five teeth on either side, with the bone bulging around the roots of tooth. The first premaxillary tooth, located close to the midline, is the smallest and the teeth get progressively larger until reaching their maximum size at the fourth tooth, which is twice the size of the second. The fifth is smaller again, about as large as the third tooth. The premaxillary teeth are followed by a pronounced notch, which likely received an enlarged dentary tooth. Very little of the maxilla is preserved, but it still reveals important information on the skull of Dentaneosuchus. The maxilla appears to be fused to the nasal bone, obscuring the suture between the two. Furthermore, the way the two elements connect shows that the rostrum of Dentaneosuchus would have been trapezoid in cross section, meaning it was broader around the toothrow and narrowed towards the top. More is known of the nasal, which is preserved in two large chunks. The first is connected to the maxillary fragment, while the more posterior piece is still connected to the skull table. The nasal duct was separated by a septum and the surface of the nasal bone shows no suture, indicating that rather than being paired, the nasal bones were fused into a single elongated element. The nasal was long, stretching from the front of the rostrum where it contacts the premaxilla and likely contributed to the bony wall separating the nares to the frontal bone. As the bone tapers towards the front of the skull, it takes on a wand-like appearance. The prefrontals are plate-like bones situated atop the head and overhanging the eye sockets. The lacrimal bones are only poorly preserved, but face more to the sides than the prefrontals. The various bones of the skull table (frontal, parietal, supraoccipital and exoccipital) are all fused into a single mass. In Dentaneosuchus the space between the orbits and the supratemporal fenestrae is preserved. Only a small piece of the quadratojugal is preserved.

The mandibular symphysis is formed by the fusion of both dentaries and a part of the splenial, encompassing the first seven teeth of the lower jaw and being overall spoon-shaped. A total of at least 19 teeth is thought to have been present in the mandible of Dentaneosuchus. The teeth of the lower jaw initially form a semicircle at the tip of the lower jaw extending from the first dentary tooth to the fourth, after which there is a slightly larger space before the fifth tooth. However this small break is not to be confused with a true gap in the dentition (diastema) as seen in some other crocodylomorphs. From the fifth onward, the teeth are organized in a single, straight row of closely spaced alveoli. The overall shape of the toothrow creates two distinct waves, with the top of the first wave being crowned by the fifth dentary tooth. The largest tooth of the lower jaw is however the fourth, as typically the case, and the teeth behind it gradually decrease in size. It is uncertain how that continues onto the second wave, as it is too poorly preserved to determine. Both the angular and surangular bone contribute to the mandibular fenestra and form the back of the lower jaw. The fenestra itself is noted for its strange, boomerang-like shape.

Although the teeth of Dentaneosuchus are generally robust thanks to the nearly circular tooth roots, they are still truly ziphodont, with slight compression and carinae covered in fine serrations.

=== Postcrania ===
Although the skull material makes up the majority of known Dentaneosuchus remains, a variety of postcranial fossils have also been collected. This includes a nearly complete humerus, which is a robust bone with a well-defined deltopectoral crest. The ischium is incomplete, with one articular process missing and the other being highly eroded. However, the preserved elements show that the anatomy is unique and the anterior articular process in particular is covered in a complex system of muscle insertions and tendon passages. This region is notably better developed in Dentaneosuchus compared to what is seen in modern crocodiles, but Martin and colleagues hesitate to draw any specific conclusions in regards to the musculature from this. Only a single vertebra is known and primarily composed of the centrum, with much of the neural spine missing. The vertebra is amphicoelous and equally wide, long and high.

Four osteoderms have been discovered, but as no sebecid preserves articulated armor it is not certain where on the body they would have been located. Martin and colleagues describe two types of osteoderms, both of which are tipped with a pronounced central crest and show highly indented outlines. The larger type is sub-trapezoid, while the smaller osteoderm variety is ovoid and longer than wide. Both bear some resemblance to those of Baurusuchus, but are sufficiently distinct. Prior studies on the osteoderms of various Notosuchians have indicated that these bones were much more deeply nested in the skin than they are in modern crocodiles and possibly covered in a thick, leathery layer similar to what is observed in softshell turtles.

=== Size ===
As the skulls of most sebecid genera do not exceed 40 cm (16 in) in total length (Langstonia barely surpasses this size at 42 cm (17 in)), it can be said that Dentaneosuchus is among the largest known sebecids. The lower jaw of this genus measures up to 90 cm (35 in) (not accounting for the retroarticular process), which puts it in a similar size range as the giant Barinasuchus from the Miocene of South America. In fact, with a preserved mandibular length of 70 cm (28 in) and an estimated total mandibular length of close to 1 m (3 ft 3 in), Barinasuchus may be only slightly larger than Dentaneosuchus. Dentaneosuchus could have even exceeded Barinasuchus in skull length considering that the type specimen from Issel is slightly larger than the more complete material from Réalmont.

This does however leave the issue of determining body size from skull length. This is rendered especially difficult by the lack of fully preserved postcranial skeletons for members of this group, which means that body size is generally estimated based on the proportions of other terrestrial Notosuchians, leading to vastly different results. Using the proportions of the incomplete peirosaurid Uberabasuchus for example would give Dentaneosuchus a body five to six times longer than its skull. Using the baurusuchid Stratiotosuchus, Molnar and de Vasconcellos calculated that the body length of Barinasuchus could range anywhere from 6.3 m (21 ft) to a gigantic 10 m (33 ft). Martin and colleagues suggest a much more conservative body length with a proportionally bigger head, estimating the total body length of the two at between 3–4 m (9.8–13.1 ft). Regardless of the specifics, this renders Dentaneosuchus the largest terrestrial predator of Cenozoic Europe.

== Phylogeny ==
Phylogenetic analysis conducted on the material of Dentaneosuchus places it in the family Sebecidae, which was recovered as closely related to the South American Baurusuchidae with which it forms Sebecosuchia. Several features of Dentaneosuchus allow it to be easily distinguished from other groups of ziphodont Notosuchians. The fused nasals and splenials, shape of the supratemporal fenestrae and presence of a large notch between the premaxilla and maxilla are among several cranial features that clearly set it apart from members of the Peirosauridae. From baurusuchids it differs mostly in the anatomy of the lower jaw, including the longer toothrow and position of the dentary-surangular suture relative to the mandibular fenestra. Many of the traits do however line up with sebecids, explaining its placement. Within Sebecidae, Dentaneosuchus was recovered as having affinities with the German Bergisuchus. While Martin and colleagues raise the possibility that some of the difference between the two could change with age, they conclude that it would be premature to make any conclusive statements on what this may imply. Furthermore, the authors also point out that there are still many unknowns regarding the anatomy of Dentaneosuchus that would greatly impact its phylogenetic placement and how future discoveries could change its position drastically.

- Sebecosuchia
  - Baurusuchidae
  - Sebecidae
    - Dentaneosuchus crassiproratus
    - - - Iberosuchus macrodon
        - Bergisuchus dietrichbergi
      - - - Ayllusuchus fernandezi
          - Bretesuchus bonapartei
        - - Barinasuchus arveloi
          - - Ogresuchus furatus
            - - Lumbrera form
              - Zulmasuchus querejazus
              - Sebecus icaeorhinus
              - Sebecus huilensis

A later study from 2025 recovered broadly similar results, featuring the same close relationship between the European taxa Bergisuchus and Iberosuchus. The key difference lies in the fact that the phylogeny published by Bravo and colleagues regards the European forms as forming a separate sister group to true sebecids alongside the early Paleocene Patagonian Tewkensuchus, which in the study remains unnamed.

- Pabwehshi
- Sebecosuchia
  - Baurusuchidae
  - Sebecoidea
    - Ogresuchus
    - - - Dentaneosuchus
        - Bergisuchus
        - Tewkensuchus
        - Iberosuchus
      - Sebecidae
        - - Ayllusuchus
          - Bretesuchus
        - - Barinasuchus
          - - Sebecus icaeorhinus
            - Sebecus ayrampu
            - Lumbrera Form
            - Sebecus querejazus
            - Sebecus huilensis

== Age ==
The precise age of Dentaneosuchus and European sebecids in general is subject to change as the various Paleogene localities of Europe are studied more closely and more information important for the stratigraphy is found. Iberosuchus stems from strata previously thought to have been deposited prior to the Bartonian, with a mammalian tooth from the locality suggesting an age between the middle Lutetian and Bartonian, while the layers directly overlying the Iberosuchus horizon have been dated to the Bartonian itself based on the presence of Anchilophus. The pre-Bartonian age was later corroborated by Badiola & Cuesta (2008), who place it firmly within the MP13-14 biozones (Lutetian), a similar age as the Spanish Duero Basin and much older than the locality of Réalmont in France. Both the type locality of Dentaneosuchus near Issel and the locality of the referred material in Réalmont are part of the Sables du Castrais Formation, but may date to different ages. The referred material from Réalmont for instance has been dated to the Bartonian, corresponding to biozone MP16, while the age of the type locality in Issel is less clear. Godinot for instance argues that the locality may be older than the Bartonian, suggesting an Ypresian to Lutentian age. Martin and colleagues however counter that the exact provenance of the material is not known and that the similarities between the type material and the referred fossils could indicate that they are of the same age. For this reason, the range of Dentaneosuchus is currently confined to the Bartonian stage of the Eocene.

== Paleobiogeography ==
The origins of European sebecids remains a debated subject and is shrouded in a variety of questions due to the poor record of the group, especially outside of South America. The fact that sebecosuchians are a primarily Gondwanan clade means that the origin of the European species may trace back to as early as the Cretaceous. While tentative at most, the phylogenetic position of Dentaneosuchus as well as Iberosuchus and Bergisuchus could suggest a link to older, Cretaceous sebecids native to Europe such as Ogresuchus and Doratodon, however both of which are equally poorly understood. Another hypothesis proposed by Eric Buffetaut suggests that the European sebecids could have arrived in Europe by traveling through North America. This is in part based on the fact that European fauna following the early Eocene is heavily shaped by faunal interchange with Laurasian groups, arriving from Asia and North America. This includes Eocene alligatoroids, crocodyloids and planocraniids, with the later group being endemic to Laurasia and absent from the sebecosuchian-dominated Gondwana. However a major issue with this hypothesis is the complete absence of any sebecid material in continental North America, with the only potential material being a ziphodont tooth from Cuba.

If not coming from European ancestors or via an unrecorded dispersal via North America, then the possibility arises that the Paleogene sebecids of Europe may have immigrated through Africa. This hypothesis was also written about by Buffetaut, but while the evidence is more substantial than for a North American origin, it is still sparse. The most significant find for African sebecids is the discovery of Eremosuchus in Ypresian strata of Algeria. This would date Eremosuchus to about the same time as the earliest Paleogene sebecids of Europe, and the two are also united in similar skull and osteoderm anatomy. Other isolated remains from the Upper Eocene have been found in Libya and Egypt, lending further credence to African holdouts of the group and a possible link between them and the European forms. However, as most of the material is fragmentary, further research and fossil discoveries would be needed to substantiate the hypothesis.

Martin and colleagues further consider the origin of sebecids as a whole following the discovery of Dentaneosuchus, proposing two additional models for their evolution. The first suggests not a Gondwanan origin for the family, but one centered in Europe, dispersing into Africa and rafting across the Atlantic to South America in a fashion similar to caviomorph rodents. Another possibility raised by them is that sebecids originated in Africa and from there dispersed independently into Europe and South America. Both ideas run contrary to the traditional interpretation that sebecids are of South American origin and would require further testing and most importantly better fossil material.

== Paleobiology ==
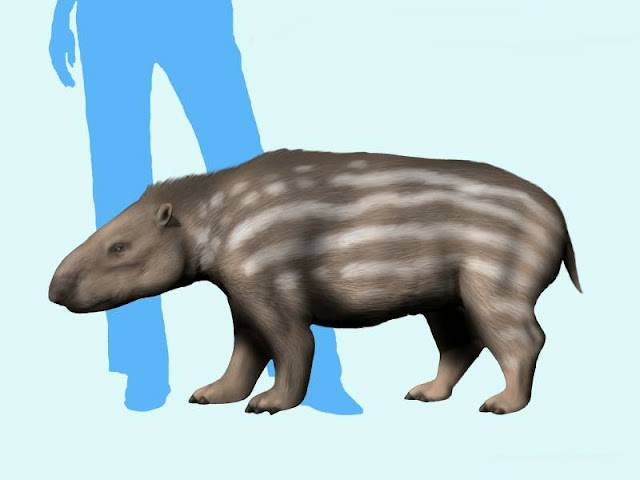
Dentaneosuchus may have preyed on animals like Lophiodon

The massive size of Dentaneosuchus matches the increase in size undergone by contemporary mammal species of Europe. Studies on parts of the mammal fauna of the Geiseltal in Germany for instance reveal that gigantism during the Eocene may be tied to biotic factors such as climate and available resources. The cooling climate of the Eocene could have been one contributing factor to the increased size of Dentaneosuchus, as modern crocodilians display greater size at greater latitudes in accordance with Bergmann's rule. However, it is not clear if this rule is as easily applied to terrestrial Notosuchians both due to their distant phylogenetic relationship with modern crocs and their different lifestyle.

While the precise details of which prey Dentaneosuchus preferred are not known and require isotopic analysis to determine, the great size alone is a good indicator for the fact that this sebecid was an apex predator in its environment. Dentaneosuchus would have likely been capable of preying on animals its own size and possibly larger. This includes the early perissodactyl Lophiodon lautricense, which could reach a weight of up to 2.000 kg (4.409 lb) and was found in the same deposits as the sebecid. Other predators native to continental Europe that may have been in competition with Dentaneosuchus includes planocraniid crocodiles like Boverisuchus, large terrestrial birds and hyaenodontid mammals.

The dominance of crocodylomorphs as apex predators in the early stages of the Cenozoic is likely to be explained through the absence of significant mammalian carnivores. This is most noticeable in Paleogene Europe and in South America until the Late Miocene. However, this dominance would not last and Dentaneosuchus was likely among the last large non-mammalian predators left, as they appear to have disappeared throughout the course of the Bartonian. The reasons for their extinction both in Europe and South America remain unknown, but may include a lack of suitable prey, competition from mammalian predators, changes in climate and environment or other biotic or even abiotic factors as of yet undiscovered.
