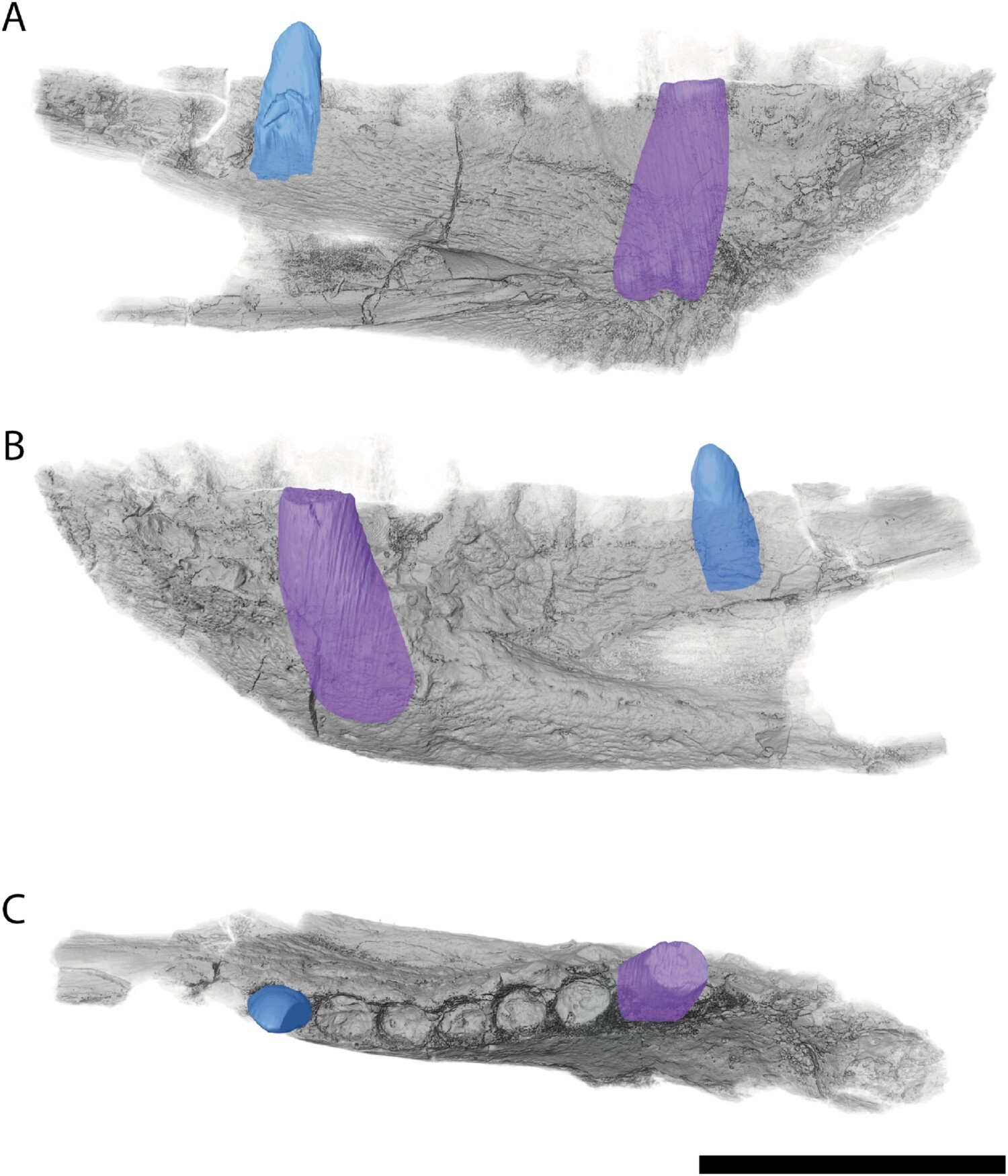
- Computed tomography scan of the holotype of Eremosuchus

Scientific classification
- Kingdom: Animalia
- Phylum: Chordata
- Class: Reptilia
- Clade: Pseudosuchia
- Clade: Crocodylomorpha
- Clade: †Notosuchia
- Clade: †Sebecosuchia
- Genus: †Eremosuchus; Buffetaut, 1989

Type species
- †E. elkoholicus Buffetaut, 1989

= Eremosuchus =

Eremosuchus Temporal range: Eocene (Ypresian) 52–51 Ma

Extinct genus of reptiles

Eremosuchus is an extinct genus of sebecosuchian notosuchian from the Early Eocene El Kohol Formation of Algeria. It was first described on the basis of isolated cranial and postcranial material in 1989, although much of the original collection has since been lost. Like other sebecids it had serrated, blade-like teeth, a condition referred to as ziphodonty. Phylogenetic analysis conducted using Eremosuchus material yield inconclusive results, but overall support a close relationship with the terrestrial members of Sebecidae best known from the Cenozoic of South America, although also well established in Paleogene Europe. It is possible that the lineage leading to Eremosuchus split off as sebecids dispersed between South America and Europe or that its ancestors arrived in North Africa from Europe after crossing the Tethys sea. It is currently the only named sebecid from Africa.

== History and naming ==
The first fossil remains of Eremosuchus were discovered by the combined efforts of the Université d'Oran, Sorbonne Universités and Université de Montpellier in 1982 at the El Kohol site in northern Algeria, specifically in the strata of the El Kohol Formation. The 1982 expedition to El Kohol yielded a variety of fossil remains including an isolated dentary bone as well as further mandible remains, some vertebrae, a fibula and even several teeth and osteoderms. After having initially been reported on that same year by Eric Buffetaut, the material was given a more thorough description in 1989, with the dentary (UO-KB-301) serving as the holotype of the new genus Eremosuchus. Much of the other material found at El Kohol was referred to Eremosuchus in the same study, barring the osteoderms, which were not explicitly assigned to the genus.

In 2025 Cecily S. C. Nicholl and colleagues published an in-depth redescription of Eremosuchus based on both the material initially assigned to the genus by Buffetaut as well as previously undescribed fossils from the type locality, including the lower jaw of a juvenile individual. However, by this point most of the original remains had been lost, sans the holotype itself and a single vertebral centrum, with the missing remains only redescribed based on prior writings and illustrations. Ultimately Nicholl and colleagues suggest that only the holotype dentary and the juvenile remains they described can be confidently assigned to Eremosuchus, with the referral of the other material remaining tentative.

== Description ==
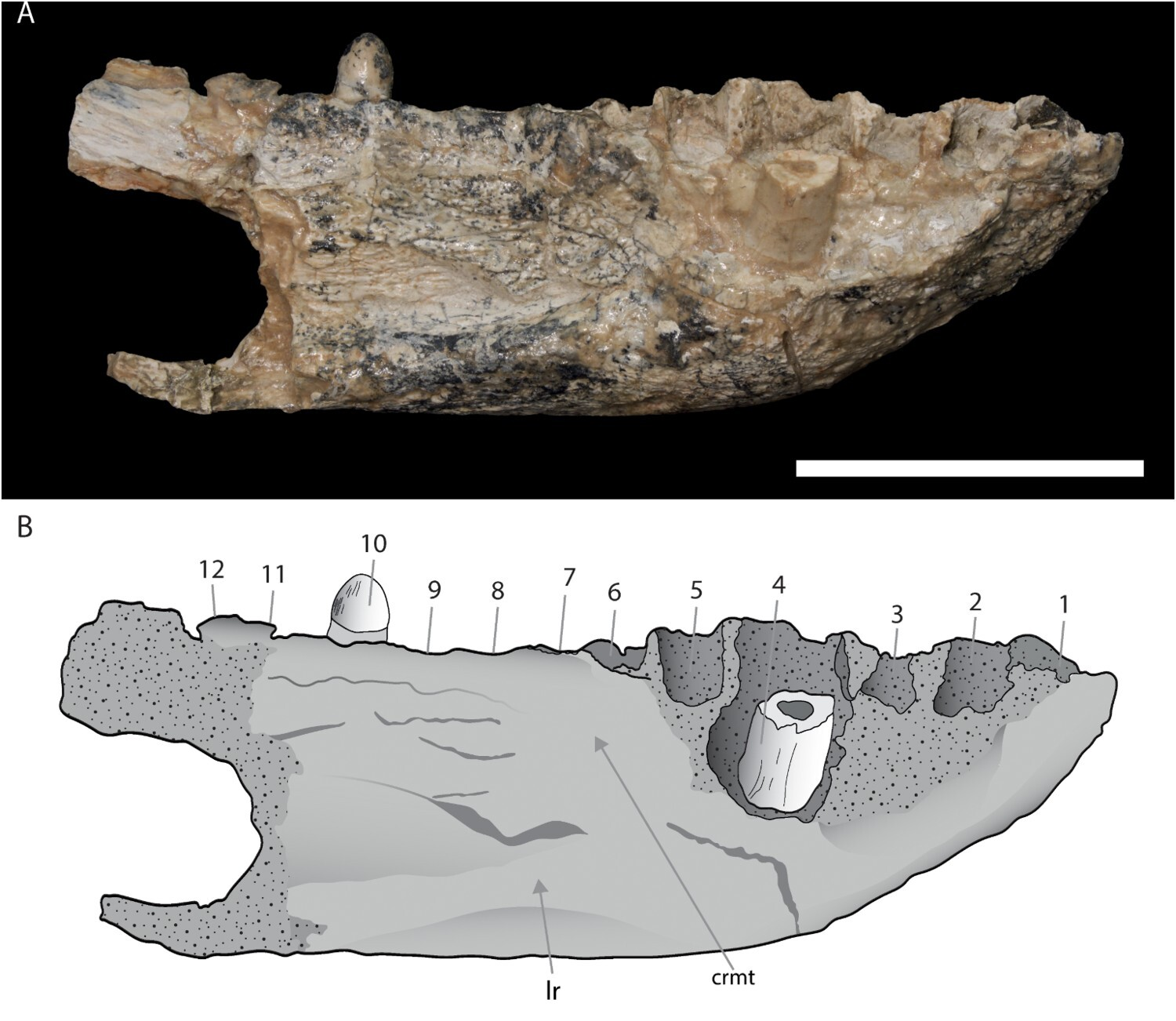
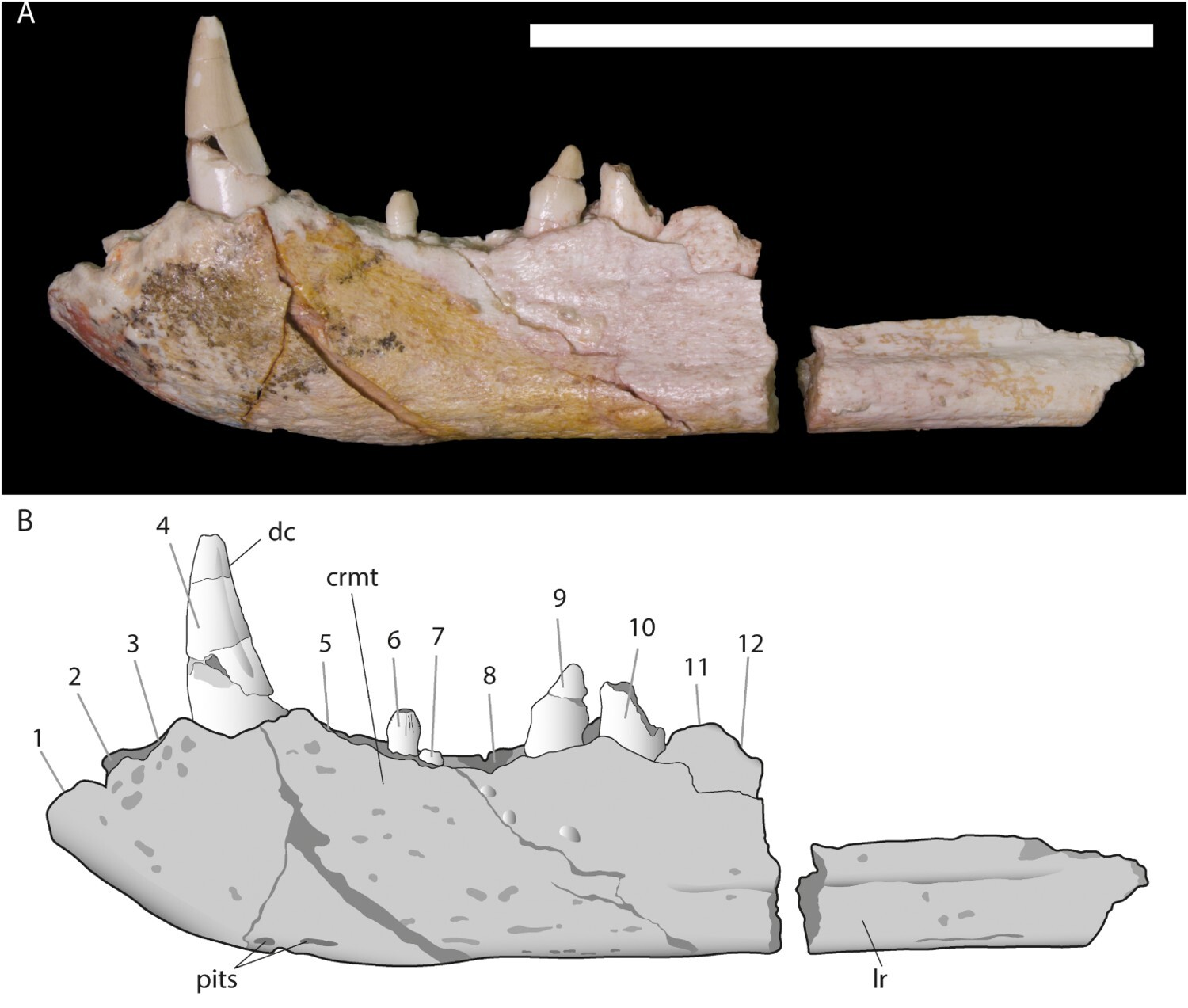
Eremosuchus is known from both the remains of an adult (top) and a juvenile (bottom) individual.

The dentary of Eremosuchus is a slender bone significantly narrower than it is high and measures a total of 156 mm (6.1 in) in the presumably adult holotype specimen. Based on the preserved right dentary the two halves of the lower jaw would have diverged at an angle of about 10 - 15°, though this angle appears to have been greater in younger individuals. The mandibular symphysis was likely narrow and U-shaped based on the curvature of the outer surface of the anterior dentary bone. The symphysis was clearly elongated and extended to at least the fifth dentary tooth in the holotype, though the splenial's contribution to this part of the lower jaw is unclear, obscuring the exact length to width ratio. Ventrally the dentary on dentary suture extends a little further, being estimated to terminate at a level between the sixth and seventh alveoli in the holotype. In the smaller referred specimen the suture is slightly longer, reaching the sixth to seventh tooth dorsally and the seventh ventrally. The height of the dentary initially increases from the tip of the lower jaw to the enlarged fourth dentary tooth, where the bone reaches its maximum height of at least 50 mm (2.0 in). Behind the fourth dentary tooth the dentary's dorsal surface is slightly concave, but remains constant in its height rather than growing taller or shallower. This form closely resembles other sebecids and baurusuchids and distinguishes Eremosuchus from peirosaurians, in which the dorsal margin of the dentary forms two distinct waves.

The mandibular ramus is mostly straight, but does curve somewhat medially towards the back of the dentary. It is furthermore almost vertical across the top 2/3rds of its height following the sixth dentary tooth. However, towards the ventral surface the ramus forms a prominent expansion that essentially forms a broad ridge that runs along the length of the posterior dentary. Similar but far less pronounced ridges are seen in a handful of other sebecids including Sebecus itself and a more dorsally positioned structure can be seen in Dentaneosuchus. The vertical dentary wall just above the ridge likely served to receive the teeth of the rostrum when the jaws were closed. In addition to this Eremosuchus preserves a notch adjacent to the seventh dentary tooth likely serving as a reception pit for one of the teeth in the upper jaw as is the case in most other sebecids.

The surface of the dentary is marked by varying types of ornamentation. The middle and posterior portions are covered by shallow, short and narrow grooves that run length-wise across the bone while the front of the dentary instead bears pits up to 5 mm (0.20 in) wide. Smaller and less developed pits are also seen immediately beneath the toothrow throughout the lower jaw.

Additional material tentatively assigned to Eremosuchus also preserves the more posterior parts of the mandible, specifically the back of the surangular, angular and the entire articular bone. The surangular is described as being expanded towards the top, thinning towards its ventral contact with the angular. It participates both in the glenoid facet and in the retroarticular process where it makes up about two thirds of the structures width. This extensive contribution to the glenoid facet is also seen in sebecids and peirosaurians while baurusuchids only have limited surangular participation in the glenoid facet. The surangulars participation in the retroarticular process is dorsally heavily excavated, medially steeply inclined and laterally forms a shelf. The surangulars portion of the retroarticular process is divided from the articular's participation by a ridge that runs more or less anteroposteriorly to the length of the mandible with only slight outward deflection towards the back, which makes it most similar to the likes of Sebecus and Lorosuchus and sets it apart from the strongly deflecting ridge seen in various baurusuchids. Looking at the retroarticular process from the side shows that the ridge is concave and asymmetrical, with its front end higher up than the back end. The lateral flange is described as so strongly inclined that it essentially faces completely towards the side of the jaw, with only the lowermost portion breaking away from this by forming a small protruding shelf. Towards the posterior end of the process the flange is furthermore described as upturned, while the adjacent medial flange deflects posteromedially, putting them essentially perpendicular to each other. The medial flange bears a small bulge possibly associated with the foramen aerum. The retroarticular process is separated from the glenoid facet, which would articulate with the quadrate condyle, by a protruding ridge that stretches mediolaterally across this portion of the lower jaw. The glenoid facet is wider-than-long with the width being approximately the same as the length of the lateral facet of the retroarticular process. While this is similar to what is seen in most sebecids and peirosaurians, it's noticeably different from baurusuchids where the lateral flange is shorter than the glenoid facet is wide.

=== Dentition ===
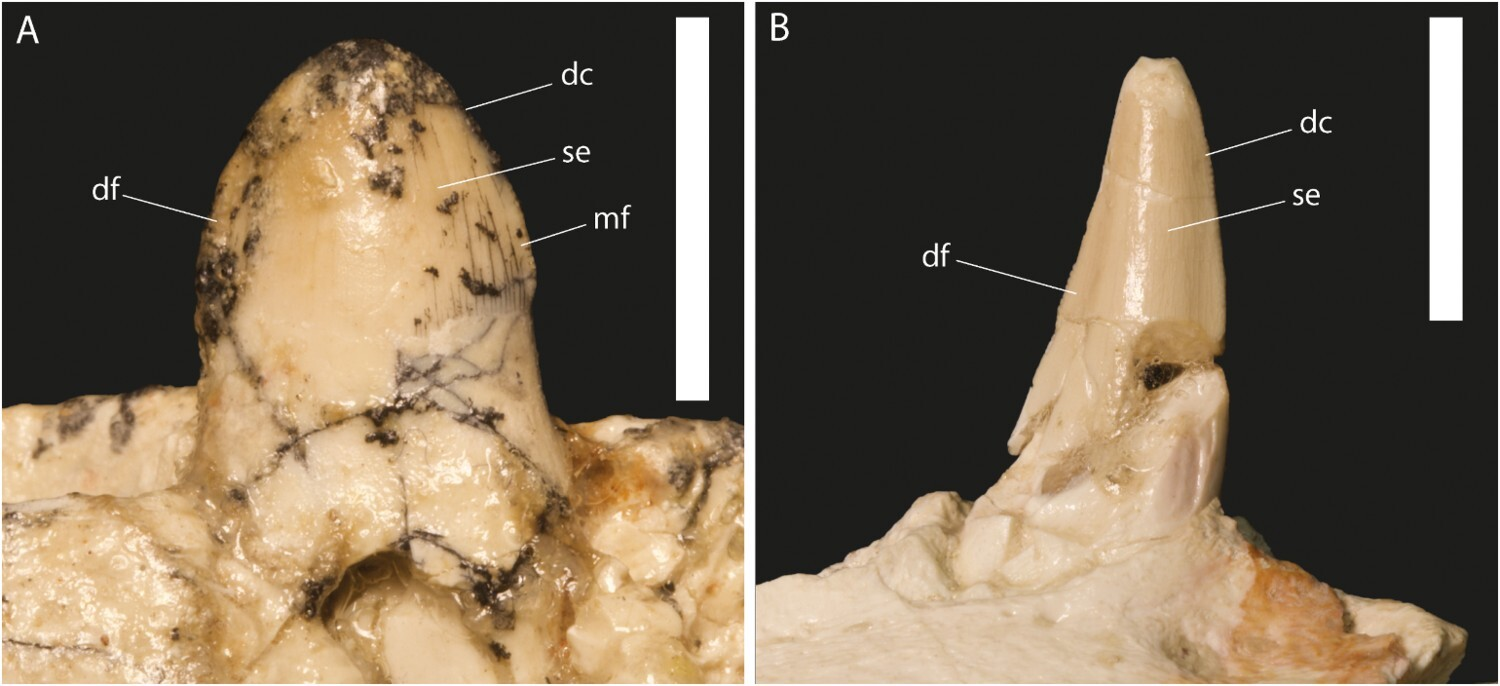
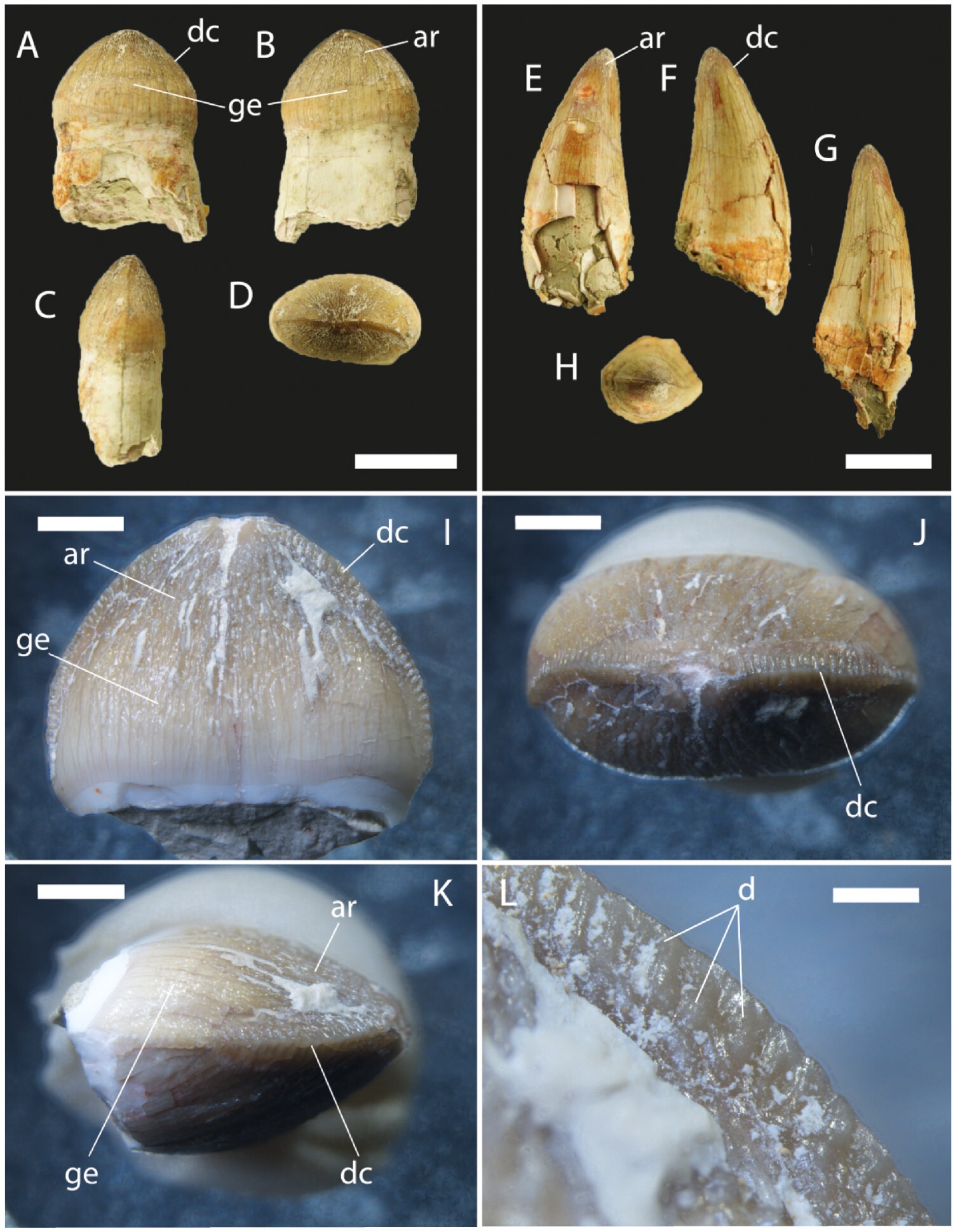
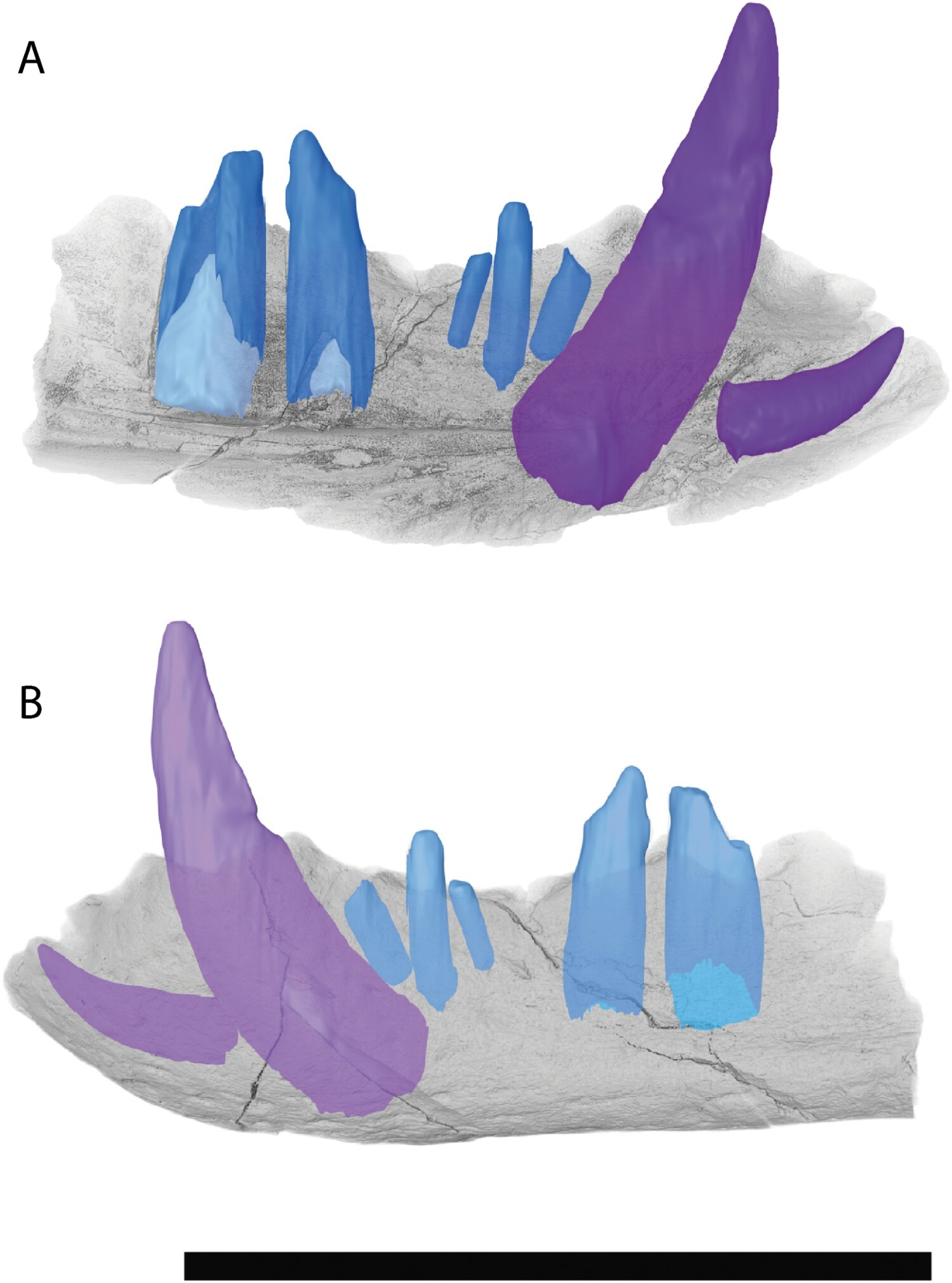
The lower jaw of Eremosuchus features both long, recurved caniniform teeth and shorter lanceolate posterior teeth. Like those of other sebecids the cutting edges are adorned by serrations.

The dentary of Eremosuchus preserves a total of 12 alveoli, which likely represent the entirety of the mandibular tooth row. This number is probably comparable to Bergisuchus and lower than that of some other sebecids, but nonetheless higher than what is seen in most other notosuchians. The toothrow stretches far back along the dentary as in various other sebecids, helping to set it apart from baurusuchids in which the toothrow often occupies only half the length or even less of the entire dentary bone's length. The individual alveoli are not positioned in a straight line but instead distinctly sigmoidal in their placement, with those in the front of the lower jaw following an outward curve while the toothrow is concave behind the fourth dentary tooth. The anterior teeth are further set apart from those further back in the jaw by their orientation, being procumbent thanks to the more anterior orientation of the alveoli. Each alveolus is separated from its neighbors by a thin septum. This does not apply to the presumed juvenile referred specimen, in which there is no septa to separate the sixth and seventh alveoli, which are instead placed in a single continuous groove. While such septa characterize a number of other sebecosuchians including Dentaneosuchus and Doratodon they are not a universal feature as some taxa like Sebecus and Baurusuchus have more broadly separated teeth with accordingly broader septa. The seventh alveolus in the referred specimen is then immediately followed by a diastema that is not present in the holotype.

Eremosuchus can be recognized by the first and fourth dentary alveoli being very similar in size, with the fourth still the largest in the lower jaw but only by a slight margin. Based on the better preserved teeth of the referred specimen, the anterior-most tooth was recurved with a much more circular in crosssection and a pointed apex. The fourth tooth was comparably more compressed but nonetheless retained a classic caniniform morphology and possessed thinning distal and medial edges. The alveoli following the fourth caniniform tooth on the other hand are fairly uniform in size, their diameter only ranging between 8–11 mm (0.31–0.43 in). The posterior alveoli are not only smaller but also much more labiolingually compressed, meaning the corresponding teeth were narrower than those in the front of the jaw. Preserved teeth of Eremosuchus confirm this assumption, with the tenth tooth of the holotype dentary being noticeably compressed. The sixth tooth is lanceolate in shape with its apex mildly rounded while even more posterior teeth are similar but more triangular with straighter edges. The cutting edges or carinae of these teeth bear symmetrical denticles, giving the teeth a pronounced serration that together with the labiolingual compression qualifies them as ziphodont.

The enamel of the teeth found still in situ in the jaw bones is described as smooth towards the base of the crown but more wrinkled towards the apex with no signs of a wear facet or apicobasal ridges. However, Nicholl and colleagues also describe a number of isolated teeth from the same locality as the holotype that resemble the teeth of Eremosuchus in every facet other than the fact that they preserve apicobasal ridges running along the crown of the tooth, being especially prominent around the apex and weaker towards the base. Some teeth furthermore transition from apicobasal ridges towards a globular texture. However Nicholl and colleagues highlight that the specific ornamentation of the tooth enamel can vary among species and even individuals, with Eremosuchus possibly being an example of this.

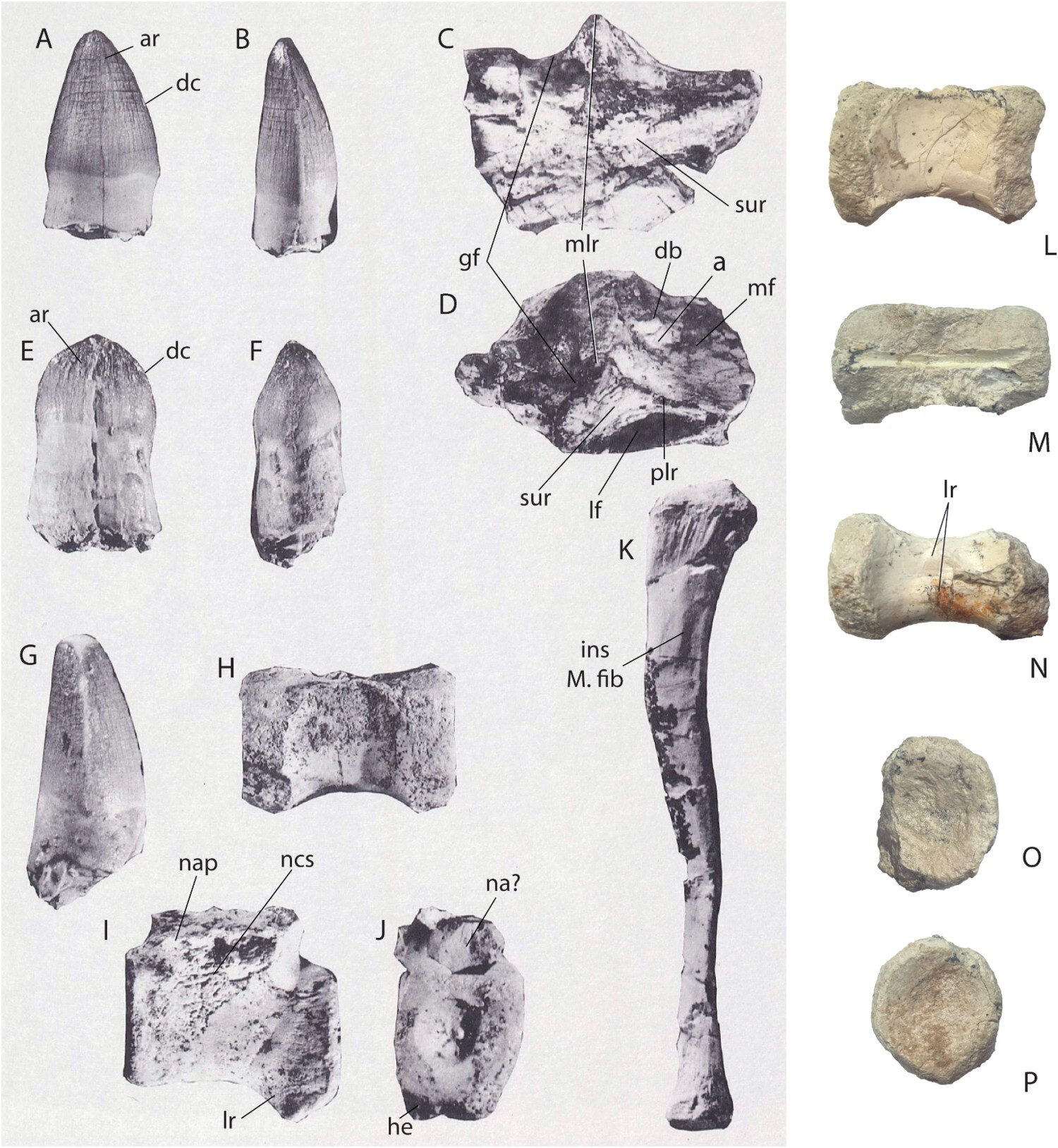
Fossil material tentatively refererd to Eremosuchus including isolated teeth (A-B, E-G), posterior mandible (C-D), fibular (K) and caudal vertebrae (H-J, L-P)

=== Limbs ===
The only known limb bone of Eremosuchus is a tentatively referred fibula figured by Buffetaut but now considered to be lost. The bone was elongated and slender, tapering anteroposteriorly for the first three quarters of the shaft beginning from the proximal end that would have articulated with the upper leg. The distal end expands again, but never grows as wide as the proximal end. They are however both mediolaterally compressed, contrasting with the more elliptical shape of the shaft between them. The proximal head is strongly domed, possesses a well-exposed medial face and a small posterior projection. This posterior projection bears the same features as those seen in baurusuchids, but is set apart by its weak development, whereas that of baurusuchids is much more prominent. The shaft bears a shallow but broad crest, likely an attachment site for the iliofibularis muscle, that extends down about a third of the bones length. Even accounting for the fact that damage to the bone means that its true length is not entirely clear, this makes the crest noticeably longer than in other sebecids or baurusuchids. The distal half of the fibula is bowed towards the back, a feature unique to Eremosuchus not seen in other sebecids or baurusuchids.

=== Vertebrae ===
While Buffetaut initially referred four vertebrae to Eremosuchus, two dorsals and two caudals, only the caudal vertebrae were figured and of these only one was later located prior to the 2025 redescription. All vertebrae are amphicoelous as is the norm among notosuchians, but the only additional description provided for the dorsals suggests they had a rounded ventral edge and a marked constriction. Regarding the tail vertebrae, the articular surfaces in the front and back are both described as relatively shallow and surrounded by a broad ridge around their entire circumference. The anterior surface is more elliptical and taller than wide whereas the posterior surface is more circular, though still slightly taller compared to its width. The centrum of the vertebrae is constricted and features a ventral surface that is concave, though the details differ between the two known tail vertebrae, as one has a symmetrical concavity (both ventral edges of the vertebrae remain on the same level) whereas the other is asymmetrical (the posterior edge is positioned lower than the anterior). Both known tail vertebrae preserve a pair of low parallel ridges on their underside located at approximately the midpoint and covering about a third of the length of the vertebral centrum. These ridges protrude quite prominently as they also do in baurusuchids, contrasting with the much less prominent ridges seen in various other notosuchians. Hemapophyses are seen on only one of the vertebrae suggesting a more posterior position within the vertebral column and though eroded they are still quite prominent. The same vertebra also preserves parts of the pedicle of the neural arch, which stretches about three quarters of the entire centrum's length and is shifted slightly forward as is also the case in Sebecus and several baurusuchids. However, the centra of Eremosuchus′ tail vertebrae differ from those of baurusuchids in their exact proportions, being relatively more elongated compared to their height.

=== Osteoderms ===
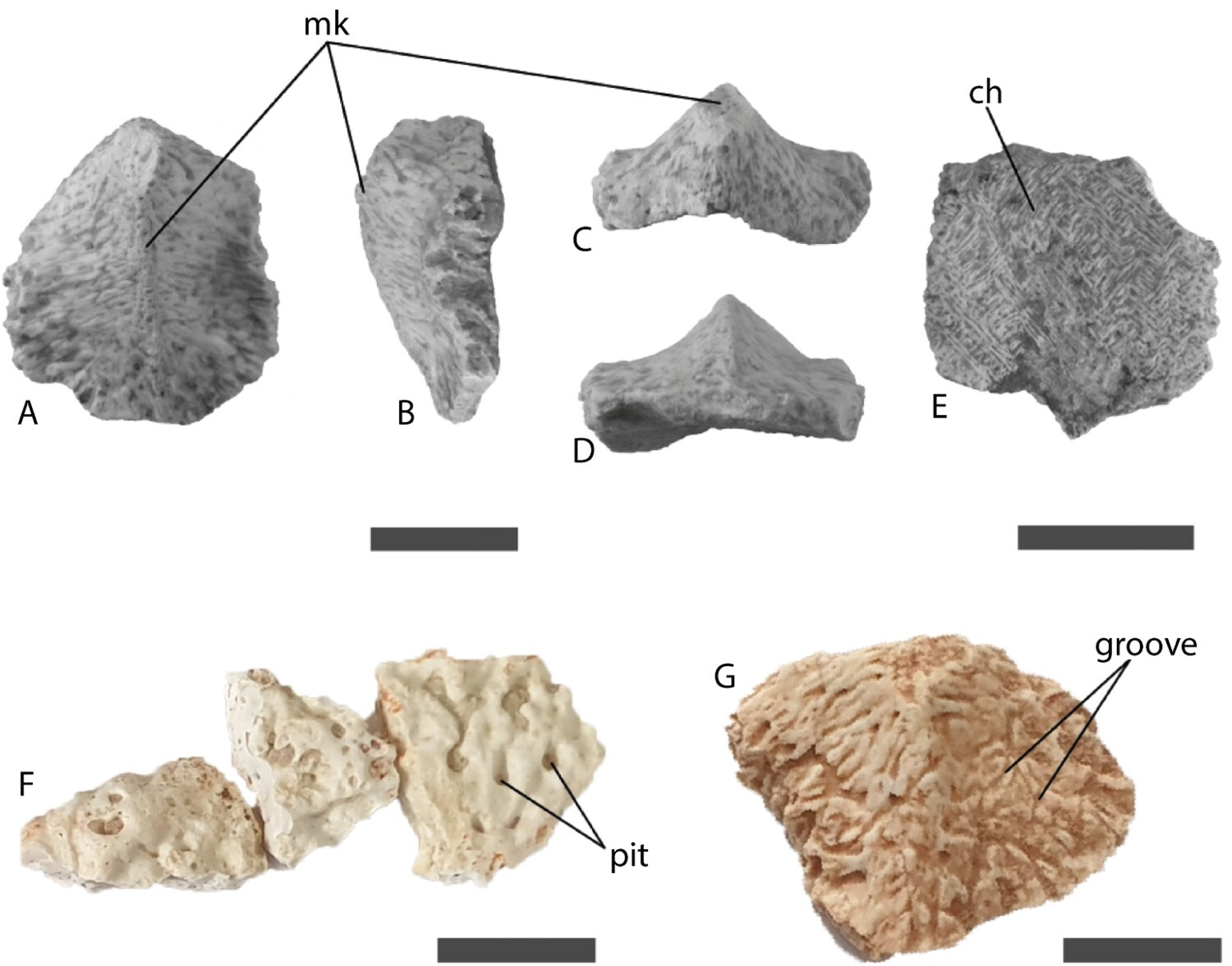
Osteoderms tentatively referred to Eremosuchus.

The El Kohol locality in Algeria has also yielded some isolated osteoderms, which although not specifically referred to Eremosuchus by Buffetaut may have belonged to this taxon. One of the better preserved osteoderms is rectangular, longer than wide and bears a broad prominent crest along their midline that reaches its highest point closer to the posterior edge of the element. While prominent, the midline crest is only about the same height as the main body of the osteoderm itself, while other Eocene sebecids from Europe have much more expanded crests on their osteoderms. The edges are bevelled and bear indentations similar to those seen in osteoderm-to-osteoderm articulation, which could indicate the presence of additional rows next to the central double row that would be expected. The edges of the osteoderms are rounded and resemble those of Dentaneosuchus, baurusuchids and peirosaurids while clearly setting them apart from the more angular osteoderms seen in uruguaysuchids.

The ornamentation of the osteoderm surface differs between specimens, with one described by Buffetaut bearing small pits and irregular grooves and another being covered by narrow elongated furrows running perpendicular or sub-perpedicular to the central crest in a way that most closely resembles baurusuchids. These contrast with three other osteoderms that appear to be covered in small and deep pits that are connected via shallow grooves like in Dentaneosuchus. This is unusual as notosuchians generally only feature one type of osteoderm ornamentation per taxon that does not change throughout the dorsal armor. Nicholl and colleagues propose three possible answers to this issue: either Eremosuchus was unique among notosuchians for featuring more than one type of dorsal osteoderm ornamentation, only one osteoderm type actually belonged to this taxon while the other represents a distinct second form or neither osteoderm type actually belonged to Eremosuchus.

== Phylogeny ==
While only known from incomplete material, a few studies have attempted to determine the position of Eremosuchus among crocodyliforms. In his 1982 report Eric Buffetaut initially entertained the idea that Eremosuchus was closely allied with baurusuchids based on the depth of the mandible, tho comparisons to sebecids and Trematochampsa were also made. By the time Buffetaut published the full description of Eremosuchus in 1989 he had come to refer it to the family Trematochampsidae, which also included Itasuchus and Peirosaurus. However, later studies eventually argued that Trematochampsidae was not a valid clade, with many of its members now generally being placed in Peirosauridae and Itasuchidae (or Pepesuchinae). Even disregarding the state of Trematochampsidae, Turner and Calvo argued that the assignment to this family was based on a few cranial features of questionable value. Some features, such as a broad concave symphysis and laterally compressed teeth, are not restricted to trematochampsids and occur in some sebecosuchians such as Baurusuchus and Sebecus. Other features such as the surangular forming part of the craniomandibular articulation can also be found in many basal mesoeucrocodylians.

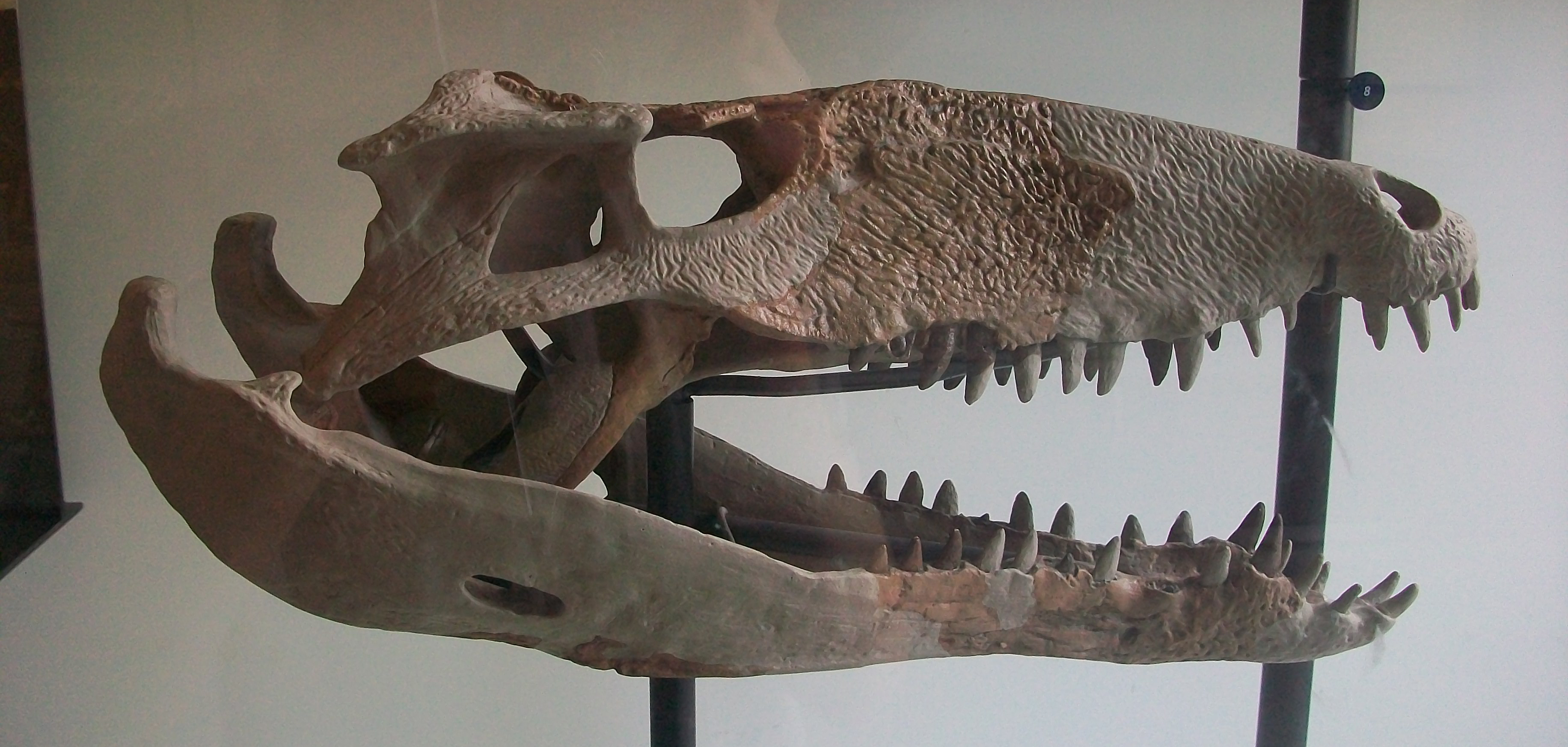
Eremosuchus is assigned to the family Sebecidae, which is best known from South American taxa like Sebecus.

Furthermore, several publications that included Eremosuchus in their phylogenetic analysis recovered it as more closely related to the clade Sebecosuchia (consisting of baurusuchids and sebecids), though in varying positions, rather than Trematochampsidae. The first were Ortega and colleagues, who proposed a close relationship to Baurusuchus in 1996, followed by Turner and Calvo who recovered it as an early branching sebecosuchian in 2005 and Montefeltro who again regarded it as a baurusuchid in 2013. In a 2025 study Bravo and colleagues recovered multiple possible outcomes including both a closer relationship to baurusuchids and one closer to sebecoids. Notably, Eremosuchus appears to clade with Tewkensuchus, Bergisuchus, Iberosuchus and Dentaneosuchus in at least some of the trees recovered by Bravo and colleagues, matching the fact that all these forms sans Tewkensuchus are found in or at least in close proximity to Europe during the Paleogene.

Like those of prior studies, the phylogenetic analysis conducted as part of the 2025 redescription yielded somewhat conflicting results, though they consistently regard Eremosuchus as being a sebecoid rather than a baurusuchid. Under equal weighting of phylogenetic characters sebecoids were recovered as a basal offshoot of Notosuchia unrelated to baurusuchids. Internally this analysis recovered derived sebecids as geographically widespread, with the Miocene Barinasuchus from South America clading together with the Cretaceous European Ogresuchus and Razanandrongobe from the Jurassic of Madagascar. Here Eremosuchus was recovered in a moderately derived position in the group, being placed in a polytomy with Bretesuchus and Ayllusuchus, more derived than Sebecus itself but basal to the afforementioned taxa surrounding Barinasuchus as well as numerous Eocene European forms including Bergisuchus, Dentaneosuchus and Iberosuchus. Both analysis using extended implied weighting of phylogenetic characters on the other hand recovered a monophyletic Sebecosuchia formed by baurusuchids and sebecoids. Depending on the used k-value Eremosuchus is either recovered in a polytomy with Zulmasuchus, Sebecus, Ogresuchus and the clade formed by Ayllusuchus and Bretesuchus or within a polytomy with Sebecus, Ogresuchus, Ayllusuchus and Bretesuchus. Nicholl and colleagues highlight that while Eremosuchus shares several features seen in some or even all sebecids, it does not present any features exclusive to baurusuchids contrary to the results of some previous phylogenies.

Featured below two of the phylogenetic trees recovered by Nicholl and colleagues in their 2025 redescription. Left the results using equal weighting of characters, right using extended implied weighting with a k-value of 8:

- Notosuchia
  - Sebecoidea
    - Doratodon carcharidens
    - Doratodon ibericus
    - - Lorosuchus
      - Sebecidae
        - Sahitisuchus
        - Zulmasuchus
        - - Sebecus
          - - Ayllusuchus
            - Eremosuchus
            - Bretesuchus
            - - Dentaneosuchus
              - - - Iberosuchus
                  - Bergisuchus
                - - Razanandrongobe
                  - - Ogresuchus
                    - Barinasuchus
  - - Stolokrosuchus
    - - Peirosauria
      - - Uruguaysuchidae
        - - Candidodon
          - Ziphosuchia

- Notosuchia
  - - Uruguaysuchidae
    - Peirosauria
  - - Libycosuchus
    - - - Candidodon
        - - Malawisuchus
          - Pakasuchus
      - - Simosuchus
        - - Sphagesauria
          - - Chimaerasuchus
            - - Razanandrongobe
              - - Doratodon
                - Sebecosuchia
                  - Baurusuchidae
                  - Sebecidae
                    - - Bergisuchus
                      - Dentaneosuchus
                    - - Iberosuchus
                      - - Barinasuchus
                        - - Ogresuchus
                          - Ayllusuchus
                          - Sebecus
                          - Eremosuchus
                          - Bretesuchus

== Biogeography ==
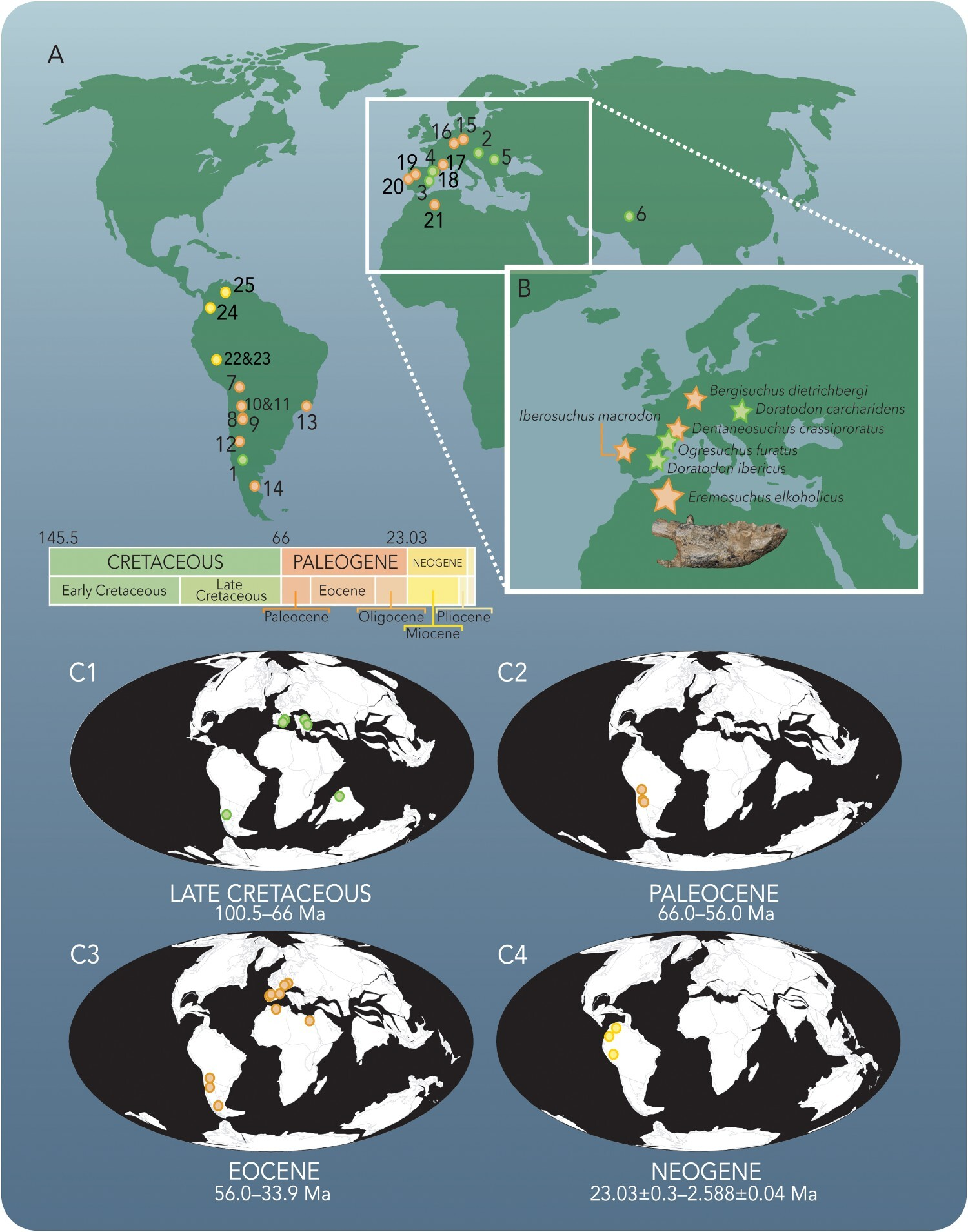
Map showing the distribution of sebecids and closely related forms. B highlights the type locality of Eremosuchus.

The origins and biogeography of Sebecidae (or Sebecoidea in some studies) remains poorly understood, partially due to the fragmentary nature and subsequent labile phylogenetic position of many purported early members of the clade. Traditionally sebecids are heavily linked to South America due to the great diversity reached by the group during the Cenozoic and the fact that multiple South American forms appear to be among the earliest diverging forms. However, fossil finds in Spain, France and Germany among others have led to the gradual recognition of a diverse notosuchian fauna in Paleogene Europe which may either fall within Sebecidae or if not nominally included in the family is at the very least closely related to it.

Given the strong ties to South America, its frequently suggested that sebecids did originate there before dispersing into Europe, a hypothesis that is supported by the often recovered close relationship with the almost exclusively South American baurusuchids. Following Bravo and colleagues, this would push the origin of sebecoids as far back as the Santonian stage of the Late Cretaceous, though they also argue that the group's origins may lie even further back, an idea that matches the hypothesis by Sellés and colleagues that sebecids were present on Africa and South America by the time the continents split during the Albian stage of the Early Cretaceous. An earlier dispersal may also explain the presence of purported crocodylomorphs with sebecosuchian affinities in the Cretaceous of Europe, namely Doratodon and Ogresuchus, though doubt has been cast on their exact relationship with sebecoids or whether they were notosuchians at all. Additionally, Nicholl and colleagues concede that given the poor fossil record of Cretaceous sebecids, which is conspicuously absent from key deposits like the Bauru Group of South America and the Kem Kem Beds of North Africa, a European or African origin cannot be excluded.

Regardless of when sebecoids first came to be, Africa is generally considered an important stepping stone in their dispersal. Assuming they didn't originate in Africa in the first place, they would have had to pass the continent as they spread from South America to Europe or vice versa, as a trans-oceanic dispersal over the Atlantic is deemed unlikely due to their terrestrial habits while dispersal through North America is rejected by Bravo and colleagues due to how well sampled that continent is. Dispersal between Africa and Europe on the other hand may be supported by whats known as the "Eurogondwana model", which proposes that though the two landmasses had split during the late Hauterivian, the formation of landbridges allowed for the periodic exchange of fauna between the two landmasses.

As the only named sebecid from continental Africa Eremosuchus may be a significant link between the taxa of South America and those of Europe. However, like the unnamed Fayum form from Late Eocene Egypt the material of Eremosuchus is quite fragmentary and its phylogenetic position labine, shifting between analyses. Because of this it remains unclear whether Eremosuchus is part of an African lineage that directly links the taxa of South America and Europe or if it instead represents a descendant of a European form that crossed the Tethys southward into northern Africa.

== Paleobiology ==
=== Ontogeny and tooth replacement ===
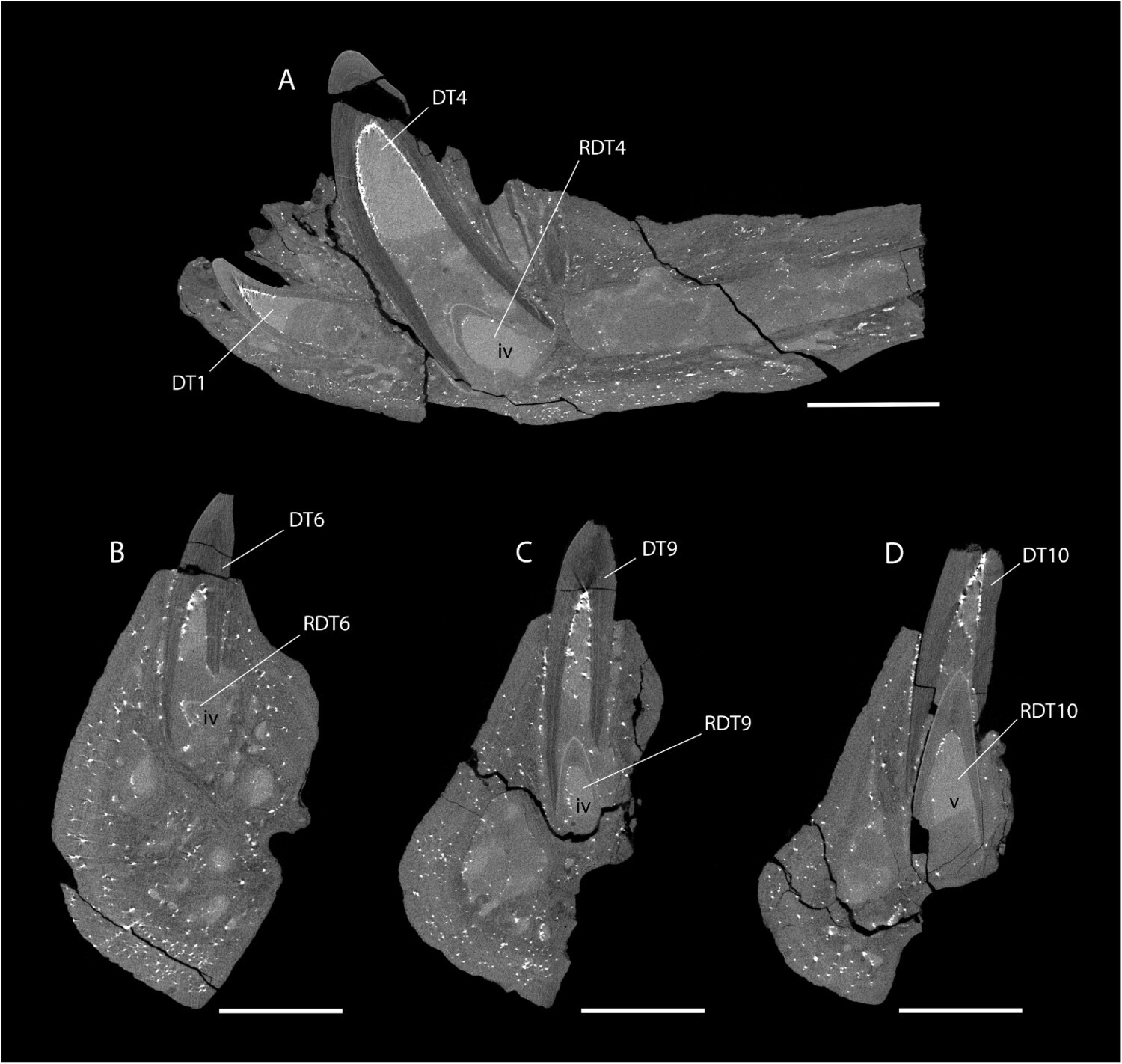
Computed tomography slices of Eremosuchus specimen UOK 347, showing the replacement teeth embedded in the jaw.

The discovery of both presumed juvenile and adult remains of Eremosuchus provides some insight into the changes the animal underwent as it matured. For instance, the two halves that formed the lower jaw appear to change their angle of divergence as the animals grow, with the smaller referred dentary indicating a divergence angle of somewhere between 15 to 20° whereas the adult indicates an angle of 10 to 15°, showcasing a difference of up to 10°, which falls into the level of variation seen in modern crocodilians. The prominent ridge that runs along the lateral face of the dentary represents another potentially ontogenetic difference, being much less pronounced in the smaller of the two specimens. While it is possible that the more subtle ridge of the smaller individual suggests closer affinities with other notosuchians to bear such a feature, it is likewise possible that the increased prominence of the ridge comes with age, as also the case with the skull ornamentation of other crocodylomorphs.

Other differences can be seen in the teeth and tooth sockets of Eremosuchus. In addition to potential differences in the relative size of the first and fourth dentary teeth, which are somewhat questioned by Nicholl and colleagues, there is a clear difference in tooth size distribution behind the large fourth dentary tooth. While the tooth sockets of the larger individual are all of approximately equal length, those seen in the smaller individual fluctuate in their anteroposterior length. This is regarded as being simultaneously not enough to question the referral of the smaller specimen to Eremosuchus while also being something that is unlikely to change throughout ontogeny. However, Nicholl and colleagues ultimately question the value of tooth diameter as a stand-in for tooth size, especially given the poor preservation of the holotype. The team further notes that though most teeth are evenly spaced and separated by distinct lamina, the smaller individual does show a prominent gap between the seventh and eight dentary teeth that is not seen in the larger specimen. While this could be a legitimate distinguishing feature shared by the so-called "Fayum form" and Doratodon ibericus it is just as likely to be the result of intraspecific variation (variation between individuals of the same species), variation within the jaw (as some crocodylomorphs are known to have asymmetrical diastemas) or simply a feature lost throughout growth as the increase in tooth size changes the spacing within the lower jaw. Finally, the teeth themselves appear to undergo some changes as well, with those in the back of the jaw being sharper with pointed apices in the smaller individual but more bulbous in rounded in the larger holotype, a change not dissimilar to what is seen in modern alligators. This could reflect a change in feeding strategy between smaller juveniles and fully grown adults.

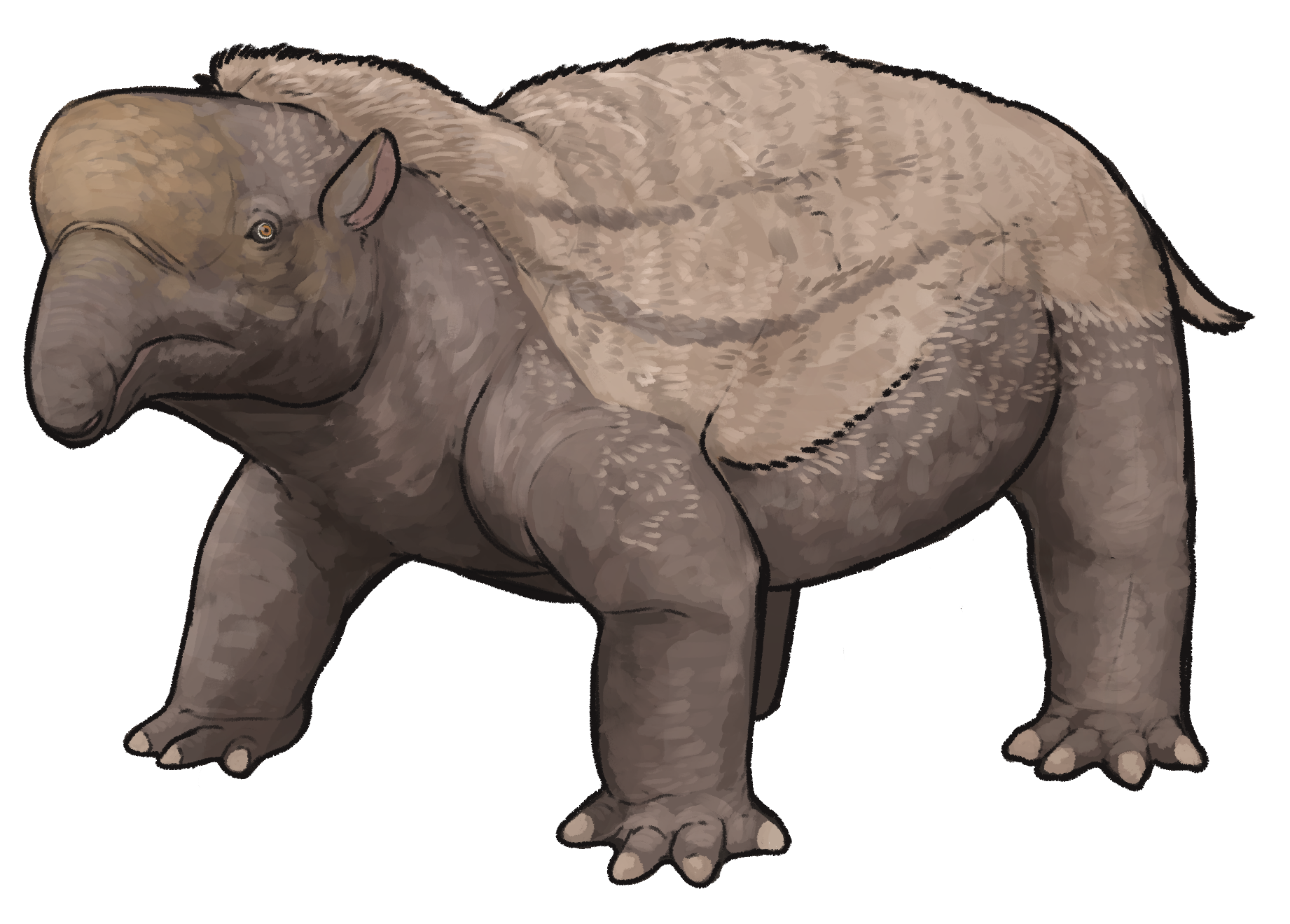
Numidotherium koholense, an early proboscidean known from a plethora of remains discovered within the El Kohol Formation.

The smaller El Kohol dentary not only preserves multiple teeth in situ but also the underlying replacement teeth, which in crocodilians can be split into seven phases. In modern crocodilians tooth replacement initially follows a specific pattern, starting in the back of the jaw and moving forward, though the pattern becomes less organized with age. In contrast the notosuchian Caipirasuchus seems to share the same pattern only in the upper jaw, whereas the mandibular teeth don't behold to any specific order when it comes to tooth replacement. Eremosuchus mirrors Caipirasuchus in showing no noticeable pattern concerning when which tooth is replaced. Of the four teeth that preserve their eventual replacements (those being the fourth, sixth, ninth and tenth) the tenth apperas to be the furthest ahead, having entered stage V in which the replacement tooth has begun to erode the labial side of its predecessor. Teeth four and nine are both in stage IV wherein the replacement teeth are moving into the pulp cavity of the teeth in use. Finally tooth six is also suggested to be in stage IV but at an earlier point in the process. Summarized this means that in the smaller Eremosuchus specimen the tenth tooth is the closest to being replaced, followed by teeth four and nine. The sixth tooth is the least advanced in the process among those showing active replacement while all other teeth have no indicators of undergoing replacement.

=== Paleoenvironment ===
The fossil remains of Eremosuchus have been recovered from the El Kohol Formation located in Algeria, which is dated to the Ypresian stage of the Early Eocene. The fossiliferous marl layers that make up the Marly El Kohol Member are considered to represent a lacustrine environment. Benyoucef and colleagues identified a number of sedimentary facies types from the relevant stratigraphic layer that can be correlated to specific depositional environments, generally recovering either an inland lake environment or palustrine wetlands. The facies suggest a fairly shallow, low to moderate-energy lake being present that was subject to periodic desiccation and occasional high-energy inflows. The discovery of certain charophyte species furthermore suggests seasonal changes in water salinity and possibly the presence of "vegetated playa" ecosystem.

The fauna of the El Kohol Formation features a variety of both aquatic and terrestrial animals in addition to Eremosuchus. Fish are chiefly known from microremains like scales and teeth and include a species bichirs, lungfish as well as a taxon resembling the characiform Distichodus or possibly the cichlids such as Pseudosimochromis and Tropheus. African tetras were present through at least three distinct forms, one assigned to the Alestes/Brycinus complex, one similar to Sindacharax and a third of the genus Hydrocynus, which includes the modern tigerfish. Mammal remains are numerous and include the early elephant-relative Numidotherium, the hyracoid Seggeurius, the adapisoriculid Garatherium, the creodont Koholia atlasense as well as an early bat. Reptiles and amphibians are represented by freshwater turtles, alethinophidian snakes and a neobatrachian frog.
