= Salamanca Formation =

Geologic formation in Chubut Province, Argentina

- Stratigraphic range: latest Maastrichtian-Danian (Tiupampan-Riochican); ~66.0–57 Ma
- Unit of: Río Chico Group
- Underlies: Peñas Coloradas Formation (Río Chico Group)
- Overlies: Lago Colhué Huapí Formation (Chubut Group)

Lithology
- Primary: Sandstone, mudstone
- Other: Limestone

Location
- Country: Argentina
- Extent: Golfo San Jorge Basin

Type section
- Region: Chubut and Santa Cruz Provinces
- Country: Argentina
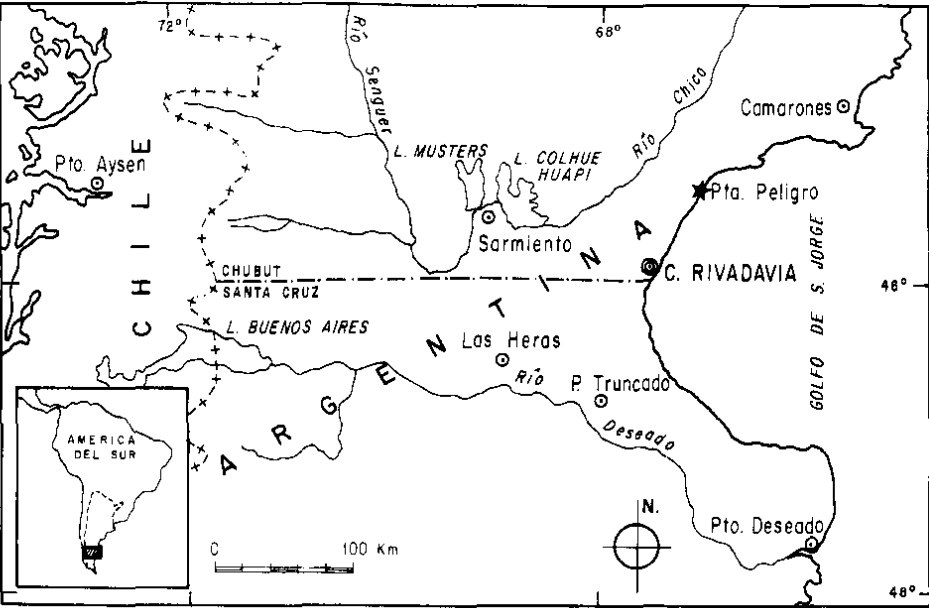
- Location of the Salamanca Formation within Argentina

The Salamanca Formation is a geologic formation in the Golfo San Jorge Basin of central Patagonia that yields well-preserved, well-dated fossils from the early Paleocene. Studies of these fossils are providing new data on plant and animal diversity following the end-Cretaceous extinction event.

The Salamanca Formation crops out in the San Jorge Basin in southern Chubut and northern Santa Cruz provinces, Argentina, overlying the Cretaceous Chubut Group and is part of the Paleocene and Eocene Río Chico Group. The formation yields abundant plant remains as well as fossils of invertebrates, marine macrofaunas, reptiles, and mammals. The formation consists primarily of estuarine to shallow marine deposits.

Palynological analysis of the Salamanca Formation shows low floral diversity after the end-Cretaceous mass extinction, followed by a rapid recovery. 50% of all pollen types are angiosperms, whereas gymnosperms accounted for only ~13% of total richness; however, Classopollis pollen, representing the extinct conifer family Cheirolepidiaceae, is the most abundant palynomorph. Wood assemblages from the Salamanca Formation are dominated by conifers, but the presence of fossil angiosperm woods indicate that they were also part of the canopy. The co-occurrence of palms, dicot woods with indistinct growth rings, and alligatorids, indicates temperature remained above freezing year-round. The results of leaf physiognomic analyses indicate that the climate in the San Jorge Basin during the early Paleocene was warm subtropical.

== Paleoflora ==
=== Angiosperm ===
Name	Species	Locality	Material	Notes	Image
Akania	A. sp.	Palacio de los Loros		A flowering plant of the family Akaniaceae	
Banaraphyllum	B. ovatum	Palacio de los Loros		A flowering plant	
Cissites	C. patagonicum	Palacio de los Loros		A flowering plant belonging to Vitaceae, related to the modern genus Cissus	
Cunoniantha	C. bicarpellata			A flowering plant belonging to the family Cunoniaceae	
Dryophyllum	D. australis	Palacio de los Loros		A flowering plant	
Fagophyllum	F. duseni	Palacio de los Loros		Leaves, related to Fagaceae	
Lacinipetalum	L. spectabilum	Palacio de los Loros		A flowering plant belonging to the family Cunoniaceae	
Laurophyllum	L. chubutensis L. piatnitzkyi	Palacio de los Loros		A flowering plant belonging to the family Lauraceae	
Myrica	M. premira	Palacio de los Loros		A flowering plant belonging to the family Myricaceae	
Nothofagus	sp.		Leaves		
Notiantha	N. grandensis	Rancho Grande	Flowers	A flowering plant belonging to the family Rhamnaceae	
Palaeophytocrene	P. ga	Estancia Las Violetas	A fruit	A flowering plant belonging to the family Icacinaceae	
Paracacioxylon	P frenguellii	Palacio de los Loros	Wood	A flowering plant belonging to the family Mimosoideae	
Paranymphaea	P aristolochiaformis	Palacio de los Loros		A flowering plant belonging to the family Nymphaeaceae	
Sterculia	S. acuminataloba	Palacio de los Loros		A flowering plant belonging to the family Malvaceae	
Stephania	S. psittaca	Palacio de los Loros		A flowering plant belonging to the family Menispermaceae	
Suessenia	S. grandensis	Rancho Grande	Leaves	A flowering plant belonging to the family Rhamnaceae	
Wilkinsoniphyllum	W. menispermoides	Palacio de los Loros	Leaves	A flowering plant belonging to the family Menispermaceae	
Tripylocarpa	T. aestuaria		Seed	A flowering plant belonging to the palm tribe Cocoseae	
Volkheimerites	V. labyrinthus			Flowering plant pollen of uncertain placement	
Fabaceae					
Sapindaceae					
Urticaceae					
Rosaceae					

=== Gymnosperms ===
Name	Species	Locality	Material	Notes	Image
Agathis	A. immortalis		Leaves, twigs, pollen cones, ovuliferous complexes, pollen, seeds	A conifer belonging to Araucariaceae. Oldest known species of Agathis	
Classopollis	C. sp.	Palacio de los Loros		Pollen belonging to the extinct conifer family Cheirolepidiaceae	
Podocarpaceae			Leaves and cones		

=== Ferns ===
Name	Species	Locality	Material	Notes	Image
Azolla	A. keuja	Palacio de los Loros		A fern belonging to the family Salviniaceae	
Kirketapel	K. salamanquensis			A scale-leaved conifer belonging to the family Podocarpaceae.	
Lygodium	Sp.			A fern belonging to the Schizaeales, another indeterminate distinct fern is also present	

== Paleofauna ==
=== Fish ===
Name	Species	Locality	Material	Notes	Image
Xiphactinus	X. sp.			A member of the Ichthyodectiformes.	

=== Amphibians ===
Name	Species	Locality	Material	Notes	Image
Gigantobatrachus	G. casamiquelai	Punta Peligro		A frog	
Xerocephalella	X. sabrosa	Punta Peligro		A frog belonging to the family Calyptocephalellidae.	

=== Reptiles ===
==== Testudines ====
Name	Species	Locality	Material	Notes	Image
Hydromedusa	H. casamayorensis	Punta Peligro		A member of the family Chelidae.	
Najadochelys	N. patagonica	Punta Peligro			
Peligrochelys	P. walshae	Punta Peligro		A member of Meiolaniformes	
Salamanchelys	S. palaeocenica	Punta Peligro		A member of the family Chelidae.	
Trionyx	T. argentina	Punta Peligro		A member of the family Trionychidae	
Yaminuechelys	Y. maior	Punta Peligro		A member of the family Chelidae.	

==== Crocodylomorphs ====
Name	Species	Locality	Material	Notes	Image
Eocaiman	E. palaeocenicus	Punta Peligro		A caimanine alligatorid.	Necrosuchus Tewkensuchus
Necrosuchus	N. ionensis	Estancia Las Violetas		A caimanine alligatorid.	Necrosuchus Tewkensuchus
Protocaiman	P. peligrensis	Punta Peligro	A partial skull	A caimanine alligatorid.	Necrosuchus Tewkensuchus
Tewkensuchus	T. salamanquensis	Punta Peligro	A holotype specimen consists of a partial skull	A sebecosuchian	Necrosuchus Tewkensuchus

==== Lepidosaurs ====
Name	Species	Locality	Material	Notes	Image
Kawasphenodon	K. peligrensis	Punta Peligro		A sphenodontian	

=== Mammals ===
==== Monotremes ====
Name	Species	Locality	Material	Notes	Image
Monotrematum	M. sudamericanum	Punta Peligro	Teeth from the upper and lower jaws	A monotreme	

==== Allotheres ====
Name	Species	Locality	Material	Notes	Image
Sudamerica	S. ameghinoi	Punta Peligro		A gondwanathere	

==== Meridiolestidans ====
Name	Species	Locality	Material	Notes	Image
Peligrotherium	P. tropicalis	Punta Peligro		A member of the clade Mesungulatoidea.	

==== Meridiungulates ====
Name	Species	Locality	Material	Notes	Image
Escribania	E. chubutensis E. talonicuspsis	Punta Peligro		A member of the family Didolodontidae.	
Raulvaccia	R. peligrensis	Punta Peligro		A member of the family Didolodontidae.	
Requisia	R. vidmari	Punta Peligro		A member of the family Notonychopidae.	

==== Metatherians ====
Name	Species	Locality	Material	Notes	Image
Derorhynchus	D. aff. minutus	Punta Peligro		A metatherian of uncertain affinities	
Didelphopsis	Indeterminate	Punta Peligro		A metatherian of uncertain affinities	
?Sparassodonta	Indeterminate	Punta Peligro	Astragalus		
Polydolopimorphia	Indeterminate	Punta Peligro		Two taxa, one of which is a member of Bonapartheriidae	
Metatheria	Indeterminate	Punta Peligro	Right petrosal (MPEF-PV 2235)		

=== Invertebrates ===
After unless otherwise noted

Name	Species	Material	Notes	Image
Acesta			A bivalve belonging to Limidae	
Arca			A bivalve belonging to Arcidae	
?Astarte			A bivalve belonging to Astartidae	
Aporrhaidae	Indeterminate		Gastropod	
Austrophaera			A bivalve	
Barbatia			A bivalve belonging to Arcidae	
Bathytormus			A bivalve belonging to Crassatellidae	
Buccinidae	Four distinct genera		Gastropod	
Cancellariidae	Indeterminate		A gastropod	
Calyptraeidae	Indeterminate		Gastropod	
Cardites			A bivalve belonging to Carditidae	
Cavoscala			A gastropod belonging to Epitoniidae	
Claibornicardia			A bivalve belonging to Carditidae	
Costacopluma	C. salamanca		A crab belonging to the family Retroplumidae	
Crenilabium			A gastropod belonging to Acteonidae	
Cubitostrea			A bivalve belonging to Ostreidae	
Cucullaea			Bivalve	
Darwinices			A gastropod belonging to Naticidae	
?Dosinia			A bivalve belonging to Veneridae	
Fusinus			A gastropod belonging to Fasciolariidae	
Fyfea			A gastropod	
Globisininae	Indeterminate		Gastropods belonging to the family Naticidae	
Glycymerita			A bivalve belonging to Glycymerididae	
Gryphaostrea			A bivalve	
Gyroscala			A gastropod belonging to Epitoniidae	
Harpidae	Nov. Gen.		A gastropod	
Heteroterma			A gastropod belonging to Tudiclidae	
?Larma			A bivalve belonging to Veneridae	
Ledina			A bivalve belonging to Nuculanidae	
Leionucula			A bivalve belonging to Nuculidae	
Lucinidae	Indeterminate		Bivalve	
Marwickia			A bivalve belonging to Veneridae	
Microfulgur			A gastropod belonging to Fasciolariidae	
Neilo			A bivalve belonging to Malletiidae	
Nucula			A bivalve belonging to Nuculidae	
Panopea			A bivalve belonging to Hiatellidae	
Patellogastropoda	Indeterminate		Gastropod	
Perissodonta			A gastropod belonging to Struthiolariidae	
Phacoides			A bivalve belonging to Lucinidae	
Pinna			A bivalve belonging to Pinnidae	
Priscaphander			A gastropod belonging to Scaphandridae	
Priscophicus			A gastropod belonging to Ficidae	
Pseudomaura			A gastropod	
Pteromyrtea			A bivalve belonging to Lucinidae	
Pseudotylostoma			A gastropod	
Pycnodonte			A bivalve belonging to Gryphaeidae	
Ringiculidae	Indeterminate		A gastropod	
Rocalaria			A gastropod belonging to Fasciolariidae	
Rotundicardia			A bivalve belonging to Carditidae	
Sacella			A bivalve belonging to Nuculanidae	
Spineilo			A bivalve belonging to Malletiidae	
Struthioptera			A gastropod belonging to Aporrhaidae	
Sulcobuccinum			A gastropod belonging to Pseudolividae	
Taioma			A gastropod belonging to Fasciolariidae	
Talochlamys			A bivalve belonging to Pectinidae	
Tejonia			A gastropod belonging to Naticidae	
Titomaya	T. longobucca & T. chalcedonica		A bivalve belonging to Venerida	
Tornatellaea			A gastropod belonging to Acteonidae	
Turritellidae	Nov. gen.		A gastropod	
Venericardia			A bivalve belonging to Carditidae	
Volutidae	Indeterminate		Gastropod	
Yoldia			A bivalve belonging to Yoldiidae	
?Zemacies			A gastropod belonging to Borsoniidae	
