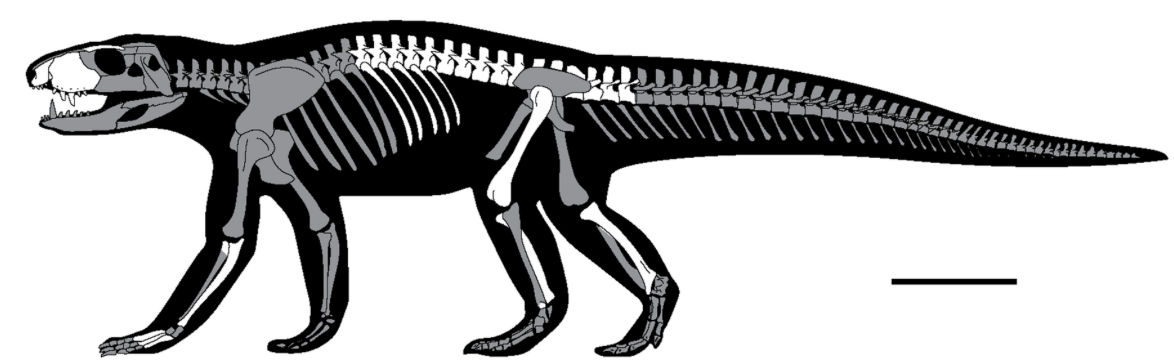
- Skeletal

Scientific classification
- Kingdom: Animalia
- Phylum: Chordata
- Class: Reptilia
- Clade: Pseudosuchia
- Clade: Crocodylomorpha
- Genus: †Ogresuchus; Sellés et al., 2021
- Species: †O. furatus

Binomial name
- †Ogresuchus furatus Sellés et al., 2021

= Ogresuchus =

Ogresuchus Temporal range: Maastrichtian ~67.6–66 Ma

Fossil sebecid species

Ogresuchus is an extinct crocodylomorph known from the Upper Cretaceous (Maastrichtian stage) Tremp Formation in Spain. The type species, O. furatus, was named in 2021. It was a small crocodylomorph, measuring 1.09 m (3.6 ft) long and weighing about 9 kg (20 lb). Initially classified as a sebecid, a 2026 study suggested that it was a neosuchian, possibly an atoposaurid.

== Discovery and naming ==
The holotype was discovered in July 2013 at the Mirador del Cretaci site, but it was stolen before palaeontologists could excavate it. After several weeks of searching, the Mossos d'Esquadra Historical Heritage Unit tracked down the stolen specimen and the thief was promptly arrested. The holotype was in a rather precarious state of conservation until it was correctly prepared several years later.

It was named Ogresuchus furatus in 2021 and the holotype is now on display at the Coll de Nargó Dinosaur Museum (Dinosfera). The generic name means "Ogre crocodile", referring to its possible diet of infant sauropods, which the specific name is derived from a Latin word being "to be stolen", referring to the theft of the specimen.
