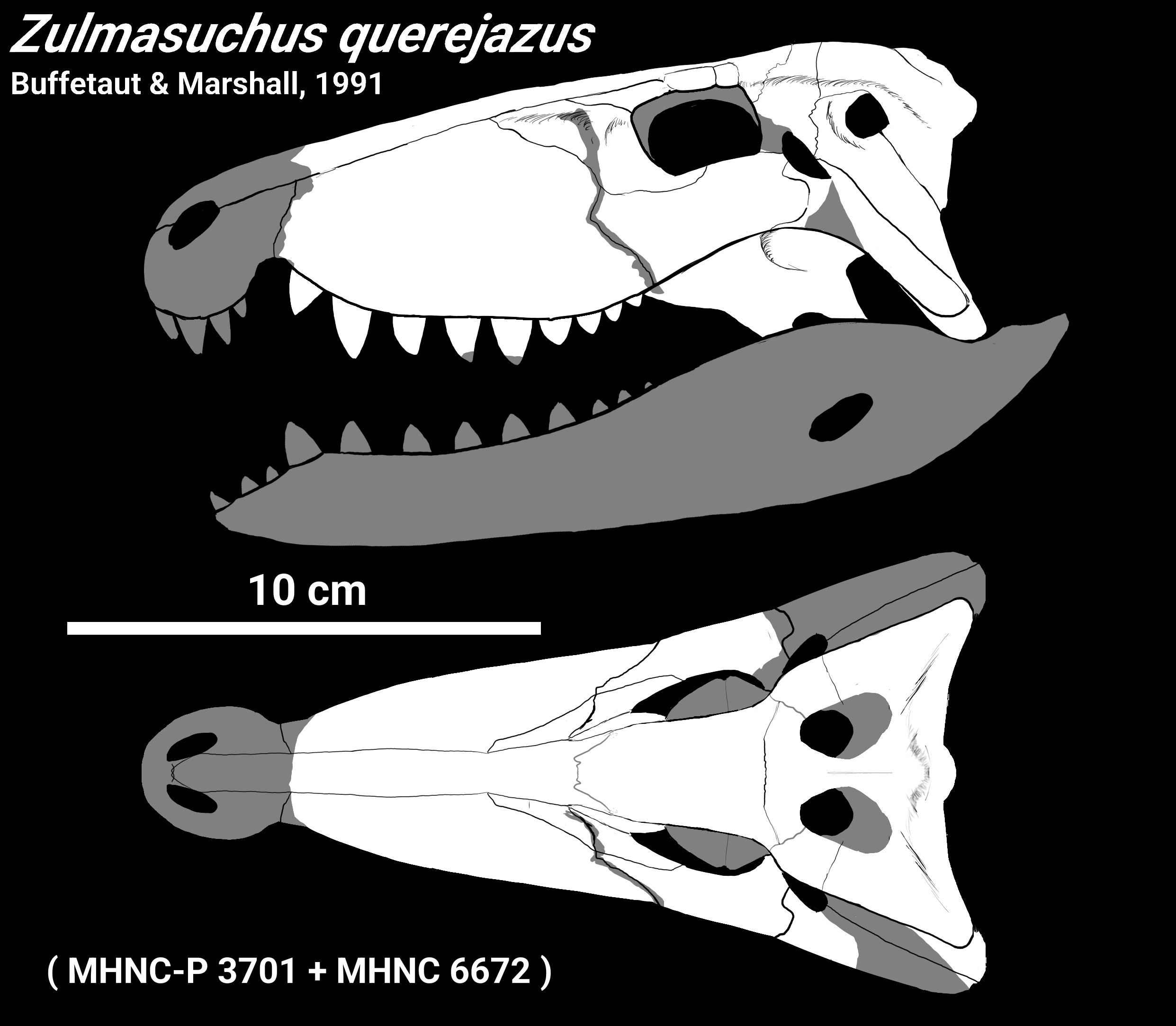
- Skull diagram

Scientific classification
- Kingdom: Animalia
- Phylum: Chordata
- Class: Reptilia
- Clade: Archosauria
- Clade: Pseudosuchia
- Clade: Crocodylomorpha
- Clade: †Notosuchia
- Clade: †Sebecosuchia
- Clade: †Sebecia
- Family: †Sebecidae
- Genus: †Zulmasuchus; Paolillo & Linares 2007

Type species
- †Sebecus querejazus Buffetaut & Marshall 1991

Synonyms
- Sebecus querejazus Buffetaut & Marshall 1991

= Zulmasuchus =

Zulmasuchus Temporal range: Early Paleocene (Tiupampan-Peligran) ~65.5–61.7 Ma

Extinct genus of reptiles

Zulmasuchus (meaning "Zulma Gasparini's crocodile") is an extinct genus of sebecid sebecosuchian mesoeucrocodylian. Its fossils have been found in Early Paleocene-age rocks (Danian stage) of the Santa Lucía Formation in Bolivia. Zulmasuchus was named in 2007 by Alfredo Paolillo and Omar Linares for fossils originally described by Buffetaut and Marshall in 1991 as Sebecus querejazus. Thus, the type species is Sebecus querezajus and the combinatio nova is Zulmasuchus querejazus.
