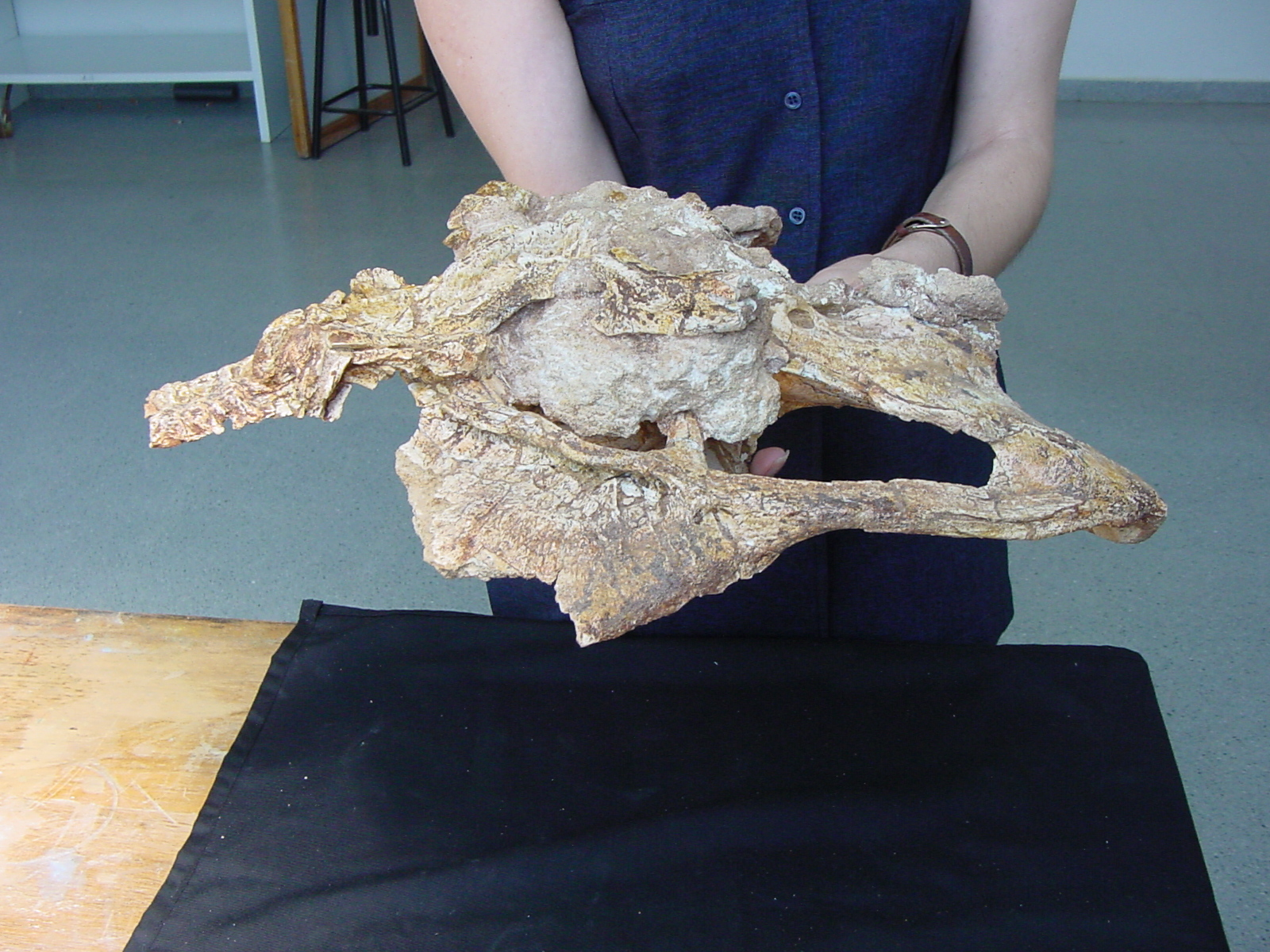
- Fossil

Scientific classification
- Kingdom: Animalia
- Phylum: Chordata
- Class: Reptilia
- Clade: Archosauria
- Clade: Pseudosuchia
- Clade: Crocodylomorpha
- Clade: †Notosuchia
- Clade: †Sebecosuchia
- Clade: †Sebecia
- Family: †Iberosuchidae
- Genus: †Iberosuchus; Antunes, 1975

Type species
- †Iberosuchus macrodon Antunes, 1975

= Iberosuchus =

Iberosuchus Temporal range: Middle Eocene, 44–37 Ma

Extinct genus of reptiles

Iberosuchus (meaning "Iberian crocodile") is a genus of extinct sebecosuchian mesoeucrocodylian found in Western Europe from the Eocene. Remains from Portugal was described in 1975 by Antunes as a sebecosuchian crocodilian. This genus has one species: I. macrodon (meaning "large toothed). Iberosuchus was a carnivore. Unlike the crocodilians today, they were not aquatic but were instead terrestrial.

The first of its fossils were cranial remains found in Portugal, and later more fossils were found in France and Spain. They are only known from very fragmentary fossils, elements of the skull, dentary, teeth and osteoderm.

== History and discovery ==
Remains of a mesocrocodylian were found in Portugal; it was named Iberosuchus macrodon in 1975 by Antunes, and is assigned as the type species. It was reclassified as a baurusuchid by Robert Carroll in 1988. In 1996 Ortega and colleges extended their range to France, they analyzed the fragmentary fossils of Atacisaurus crassiproratus (originally assigned to the tomistomine genus Atacisaurus by Astre 1931) and then considered it as cf. Iberosuchus.

== Description ==
Iberosuchus has ziphodont teeth that have a laterally compressed tooth crown that had a distally curved apex; anterior-posteriorly elongated dorsal osteoderms that have a keel running through the central median; rugose ornamentations with no pits and cupules; osteoderm lack anterolateral process; the skull is vermiculated; spoon-like premaxilla palatal shelf or mandibular symphysis; notch between premaxilla and maxilla or large 4th mandibular tooth; deep rostrum or mandible.

It also had traits that it shared with other metasuchians, the dentary had lateral depressions and had a prolongation that extends dorsally behind the tooth row; the splenials are robust, had a big slot-like foramen intermandibularis oralis; had anteriorposteriorly elongated glanoid fossa on articular.

Though only known by skull fragments and osteoderms, many artistic reconstructions use its close relatives such as Sebecus which has post cranial remains found as a reference.

=== Cranial fossils ===
==== Premaxilla ====
There are 3 fossils of the premaxilla excavated from Aumelas, one consisting a close to complete right element, a fragmentary right element, and one with both elements pressed up against one another; they all display a very vermiculated surface texture and contain a concave dent where the dentary tooth lay. Premaxilla foramen is also visible on right element fossil's palatal view and the nares are anterior pointing, the lateral surface has very distinct ornamentation composed of bony ridges that make up the nares lateral margin. The premaxilla contains five alveoli, they increase in diameter towards the distal end and the fourth one being the largest, the last is the same size as the third and does not line up with other alveoli. There are two deep pits lingually right next to the third and fourth alveoli.

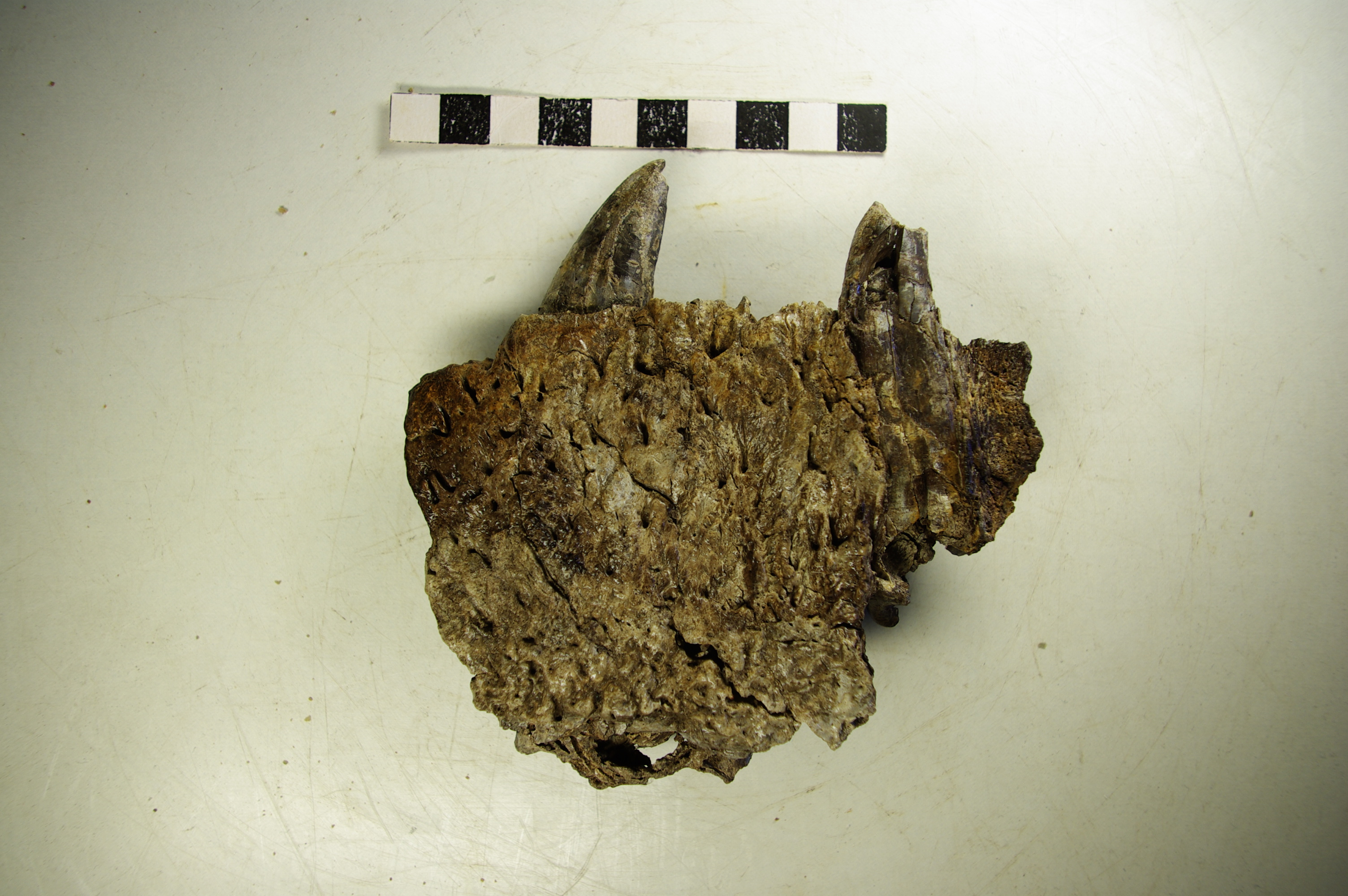
The right premaxilla of an Iberosuchus from France

==== Maxilla ====
There are two maxilla fossils excavated from Robiac and Saint-Martin-de-Londres, both being a fragment of the maxilla. The Robiac specimen is from the right maxilla, a fragment of the posterior part, with two ziphodont tooth crowns that are broken still on it. The Saint-Martin-de-Londres specimen is also the right maxilla, but larger. Both specimen display a vermiculated surface texture; no palatal processes are visible, but ectopterygoid is visible. There are six alveoli on the maxilla, they are compressed and have an oblique shape, with the third one being the largest. There is a dent visible in collars of the alveoli when viewed medially, the walls of the alveoli are clearly separated and is as tall as the maxilla.

==== Nasal ====
There is a fragment of the paired nasals recovered from Aumelas, it has a slight convex shape on its dorsal surface. On the center of each nasal is a pair of ventrally opening foramina, each nasal is vertically concaved with a lateral oblique wall, the nasals are narrower in their anterior portion.

==== Postorbital ====
There is a close to complete postorbital fossil found in Aumelas, its dorsal surface is vermiculate and bears a distinct anterolateral process with a concave notch that possibly where the palpebral bone sat. The post orbital is orientated vertically, and the cross section has a triangular shape with both sides concaved; the supratemporal fenestra's anterior-lateral edge is formed by the postorbital. In the dorsal view, the posterior of the postorbital insets into a concave and smooth structure deeply.

==== Mandible ====
The mandible specimen was found in the "Lutetian" fossil site of Issel in France. It has a symphysis that has a spoon-like shape that reaches the 8th alveoli and is the thickest in with at the 4th tooth, the splenial is one-half the length of the symphysis. The dentary has light started ornamentations and vermiculation, there are a row of vascular foramen that open backwards on the upper part of the dentary, and the lower half has longitudinal depressions on the lateral. There is a surface full of wrinkles on the lateral dorsal side, for muscle attachment to surangular.

=== Teeth ===
The teeth that are recovered are all labiolingually compressed with denticles along the edges, hence they are ziphodont, and the crown curves distally.

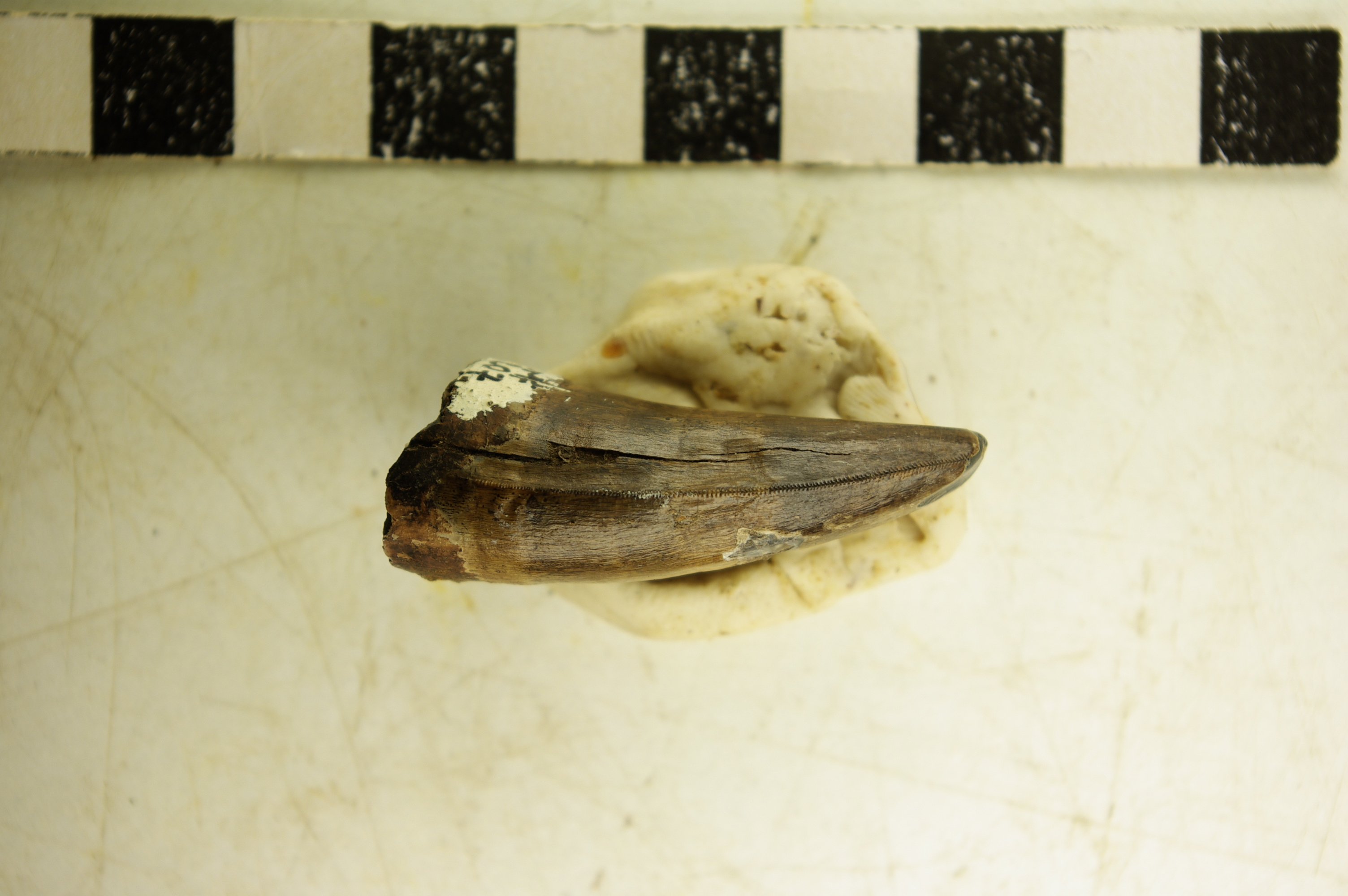
A fossil tooth of an Iberosuchus.

=== Osteoderm ===
Multiple osteoderm are found in Robiac. They have a tall ridge surrounded by smaller ridges. In some smaller osteoderms, a ridge runs along the length of the osteoderm, joining with two smaller accessory processes and form a cross shape in the dorsal view, ventral side is concaved. Larger osteoderms also have a similar shape, but the main body is flatter with an indented outline, ventral side is flat.

== Palaeobiology ==
=== Palaeoecology ===
The limb morphology of Iberosuchus suggests that it had an erect stance and was a large terrestrial predator.

== Phylogeny ==
Below is a simplified cladogram from Pol and Powell (2010) showing the relationship between Iberosuchus and other sebecosuchians.

- - - Chimaerasuchus
    - Sphagesaurus
  - Sebecosuchia
    - Pehuenchesuchus
    - - Cynodontosuchus
      - - - Pabwehshi
          - Stratiotosuchus
        - - Baurusuchus pachecoi
          - Baurusuchus salgadoensis
      - - Bergisuchus
        - Iberosuchus
        - - Lorosuchus
          - - Barinasuchus
            - - - Ayllusuchus
                - Bretesuchus
              - - Lumbrera form
                - Sebecus huilensis
                - Sebecus icaeorhinus
                - Sebecus querejazus

== Geology and paleoenvironment ==
=== Portugal ===
The first fossil of Ibersosuchus consisting of cranial remains was excavated in the Feligueira Grande Formation located in Praia de Vale Furado in the Leiria District of Portugal. Formation consists of sandstone, with gravel and silt, and in the site various mammals and turtles were found such as Paralophiodon cf. leptorhynchum. The formation is composed of ante-Bartonian rocks.

=== Spain ===
The fossils of Ibersosuchus excavated in Spain includes a mandibular element, a snout fragment, teeth and osteoderms. The mandibular element was found in Caenes, Salamanca Province in Spain; it from the Bartonian age in MP 16 (mammal Paleogene zone), which is roughly 44 to 39 million years ago. The other is snout fragment Tosalet del Morral of Lerida province in Spain, from the Lutetian age. The teeth and osteoderms are from Cuenca del Duero, Spain from Lutetian age, MP13-14 which is in the mid-Eocene.

=== France ===
The fossils of Ibersosuchus from France include postcranials, cranial elements, teeth, mandibular elements and osteoderm. In La Livinière, Hérault, France, the postcranials, jugal, and some teeth are found in a fossil site of rocks from late Lutetian age, MP 15. The site is 1.5 km west of a village in La Livinere, in a bank of the Ognon river; in the same site there are many Lophiodon, as well as artiodactyls. Mandibular elements were recovered in Issel, Aude, France, from late Lutetian age, MP 14. Osteroderm are uncovered in Lissieu, Rhône, France from late Lutetian age, MP 14. The site was in central eastern France but no longer exists; was located west of Mount d'Or Lyonnais which is a small mount made of limestone 10 km north-northwest of Lyon. Along with Iberosucus, the site yielded fossils of squamates, such as iguanids, Varanoid, serpents etc. Many cranial elements, osteoderm and teeth were found in southern France in Laguedoc; Aumelas site has the oldest fossils found at the site were dated back to mid Lutetian age, MP 13; Saint-Martin-de-Londres site was dated to later Lutetian or Bartonia at around MP 15, this site is composed of a base of limestone with many freshwater gastropods, many mammals, birds, and many reptilian fauna; Robiac site was dated to be in the Bartonian age, MP 16.
