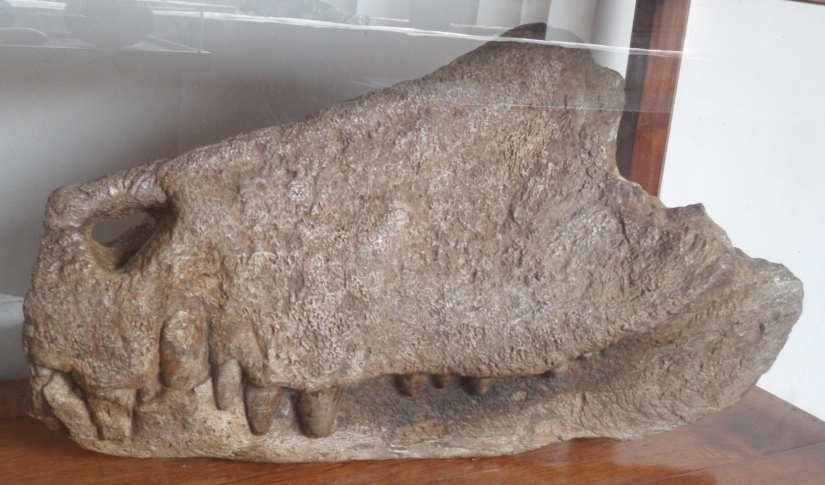
- Holotype fossil of Barinasuchus arveloi
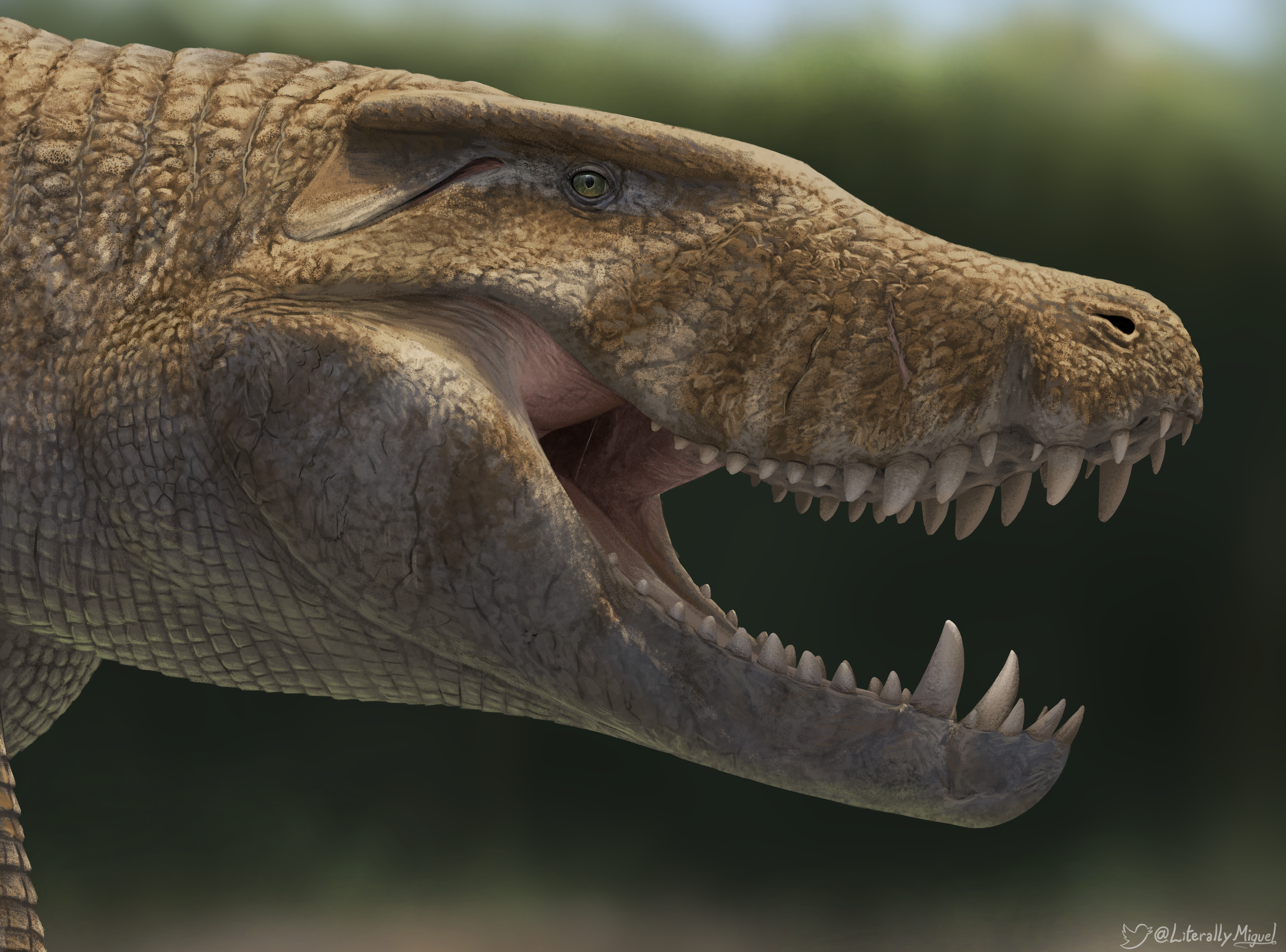
- Life reconstruction

Scientific classification
- Kingdom: Animalia
- Phylum: Chordata
- Class: Reptilia
- Clade: Pseudosuchia
- Clade: Crocodylomorpha
- Clade: †Notosuchia
- Family: †Sebecidae
- Genus: †Barinasuchus; Paolillo and Linares, 2007

Type species
- †Barinasuchus arveloi Paolillo and Linares, 2007

= Barinasuchus =

Barinasuchus Temporal range: Mid Eocene-Late Miocene (Divisaderan-Huayquerian) ~42–11.6 Ma

Extinct genus of reptiles

Barinasuchus (meaning "Barinas crocodile", in reference to where the type material was found) is an extinct genus of sebecid mesoeucrocodylian. It lived in Argentina, Peru, and Venezuela between the middle Eocene and the Late Miocene, ~42–11.6 Ma. Described in 2007, based on a severely damaged specimen from which only a snout tip was recovered, Barinasuchus is known from a single species, B. arveloi, named after Alberto Arvelo Torrealba, a local educator and poet.

The type specimen of Barinasuchus, discovered by road workers in Venezuela in 1973, originally consisted of a substantial portion of the skeleton, though much of it was accidentally destroyed when they attempted to excavate it, leaving only a partial snout and mandible (lower jaw). The specimen comes from the Miocene-age Parángula Formation, and was described in 2007 by Alfredo Paolillo and Omar J. Linares. A second specimen of Barinasuchus was recovered from the Miocene Ipururo Formation of Peru, and was described in 1977 by Éric Buffetaut and Robert Hoffstetter, though was originally assigned to Sebecus huilensis (now Langstonia). Another was recovered from the Eocene-age Divisadero Largo Formation of Argentina in 1984 by Zulma Brandoni de Gasparini.

Barinasuchus' body length has been estimated, based on comparisons with other crocodyliforms, at between 6.3–10 m (21–33 ft), though smaller estimates of 3–4 m (9.8–13.1 ft) were suggested more recently. Its body mass was initially estimated at 1,610–1,720 kg (3,550–3,790 lb), which would make it considerably larger than any terrestrial predatory mammal alive today. However, a smaller estimate of 500 kg (1,100 lb) has since been put forward. Barinasuchus was heterodont, meaning that it possessed two types of teeth. Those of the premaxilla and the front of the maxilla were longer and more conical than those further back, which were shorter and thinner. Its mandible was very robust in comparison to other sebecids, and was widest at the point of the fourth mandibular (lower jaw) tooth. That tooth was very large, and slotted into a prominent notch between the premaxilla and maxilla when the jaws were closed.

Barinasuchus primarily inhabited lacustrine (lake/lakeside) environments. During the Miocene, it inhabited the Pebas Mega-Wetland, or Pebas System, a 390,000 sq mi (1,000,000 km^{2}) expanse of lakes and marshes formed by the growth of the Andes. It, alongside its contemporary relative Langstonia, were part of an endemic northern South American predatory guild which consisted primarily of reptiles and birds. Both were among the last and largest of the sebecids, and significantly outlasted other giant taxa, such as the European Dentaneosuchus, possibly due to their isolation. The extinction of Barinasuchus and other parts of this reptile-heavy guild may have been the result of the loss of the Pebas Mega-Wetland, or the diversification of mammalian predators and the phorusrhacid birds, although this has been questioned by some studies.

== Discovery and naming ==
In 1973, road workers near Qedabra Socó, a tributary of the Rio Masparro river in Venezuela, near the eastern foothills of the Andes, discovered what was apparently a near-complete skeleton of a large sebecid while constructing an access road to the town of El Toro. The specimen, later catalogued as MAAT-0260, was found in strata belonging to the upper Parángula Formation, dated to the lower middle Miocene, possibly the Friasian South American Land Mammal Age. While attempting to remove the specimen from the strata by themselves, the workers accidentally caused extensive damage to it. Only a few fragments remained at the site when it was inspected by archaeologists. What remained of the specimen, the anterior (front) half of a skull and mandible, had been removed prior to their arrival, but had fortunately been relocated to an institution, the Casa de Cultura Alberto Arvelo Torrealba in Barinas, by an unknown party.

Three years later, in 1977, Éric Buffetaut and Robert Hoffstetter published on a sebecid specimen recovered from the Ipururo Formation of eastern Peru, dated to the middle Miocene. The specimen was referred to as Sebecus cf. huilensis, though no specimen number was provided, and it has since fallen into the hands of a private collector. As far back as 1986, Arthur B. Busbey III expressed uncertainty over whether the specimen could truly be classified as Sebecus, noting that its teeth were less strongly compressed laterally (from side-to-side), it had a wider skull, and it was far larger than any described sebecosuchian at the time.

In 2007, as part of a paper describing multiple genera of South American sebecids, Alfredo Paolillo and Omar J. Linares described MAAT-0260, and assigned it to a taxon of its own, Barinasuchus arveloi. Buffetaut and Hoffstetter's specimen was assigned to the same taxon. The binomial name refers to Barinas, the Venezuelan state from which the holotype is known, and to Alberto Arvelo Torrealba, a local educator and poet, the namesake of the museum where it is housed. In the same paper, Paolillo and Linares assigned two other specimens to the genus. The first was Sebecus cf. huilensis; S. huilensis proper was assigned by them to a genus of its own, Langstonia. The second was a fragmentary specimen (M.L.P. 73-III-15-1), collected by Dr. Edgardo Rolleri and assigned to Sebecosuchia indet. by Zulma Brandoni de Gasparini in 1984. Whereas the other two specimens were Miocene, this one comes from middle Eocene-age strata of Argentina's Divisadero Largo Formation. As with the holotype and the Sebecus cf. huilensis specimen, it is known from the tip of a snout, specifically the premaxilla and the dentary (the tooth-bearing part of the mandible/lower jaw). It is notably smaller than the two Miocene specimens, and has four premaxillary teeth, as opposed to the three observed in those. M.L.P. 73-III-15-1 had, in a dissertation, previously been tentatively assigned to Bretesuchus.

== Description ==
Barinasuchus was one of the largest known sebecids, a group of terrestrial notosuchians which survived into the Cenozoic. This lineage appears to have initially taken over apex predator niches occupied by theropod dinosaurs prior to the extinction event at the Cretaceous–Palaeogene boundary (see below). Several other large sebecid genera are known, such as Dentaneosuchus and Langstonia. Due to the near-total destruction of the holotype, the postcranial skeleton of Barinasuchus (the elements behind the skull) are unknown, and much of the skull is also absent.

=== Body size and mass estimates ===
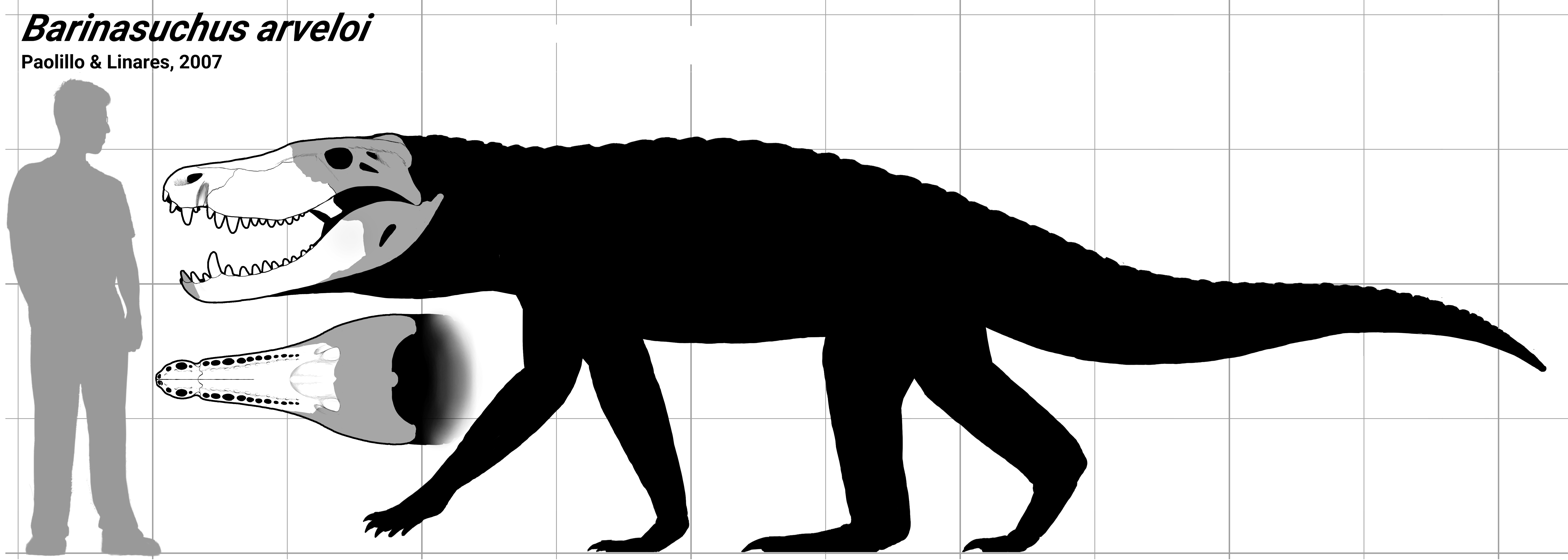
Hypothetical appearance and size of Barinasuchus arveloi compared to a 1.75m human

The fragmentary nature of Barinasuchus' holotype post-excavation has by necessity led to the use of anatomical proxies as a reference point for body size. In 2016, Ralph E. Molnar and Felipe Mequita de Vasconcellos used several anatomical proxies in an attempt to determine its size. Firstly, they used another sebecosuchian, the baurusuchid genus Stratiotosuchus, as a frame of reference, due to its completeness. In doing so, they arrived at a length estimate of 6.3 m (21 ft). Using modern crocodilians, specifically the American and saltwater crocodiles, as reference points, they attained a larger estimate of about 7.5 m (25 ft). Based on the variability of head-length-to-total-length ratios in modern taxa, they suggested that Barinasuchus may have attained a maximum body length of 10 m (33 ft). For body mass, they provided an estimate of 1,610–1,720 kg (3,550–3,790 lb). Even taking a margin of error of 50% into account, this would make Barinasuchus heavier than any (extant) terrestrial predatory mammal, and is roughly equal in mass to a black rhinoceros. However, considerably smaller sizes, both in terms of body length and body mass, were proposed by subsequent papers. The 2023 paper describing Dentaneosuchus, for example, suggested that both it and Barinasuchus were somewhere around 3–4 m (9.8–13.1 ft) in length. Similarly, in the supplementary materials of a paper published in 2025, Gonzalo Gabriel Bravo and colleagues calculated a considerably lighter mean body mass of 500 kg (1,100 lb) accounting for a very large margin of error; estimates otherwise ranged from 179–1,388 kg (395–3,060 lb).

=== Skull and dentition ===
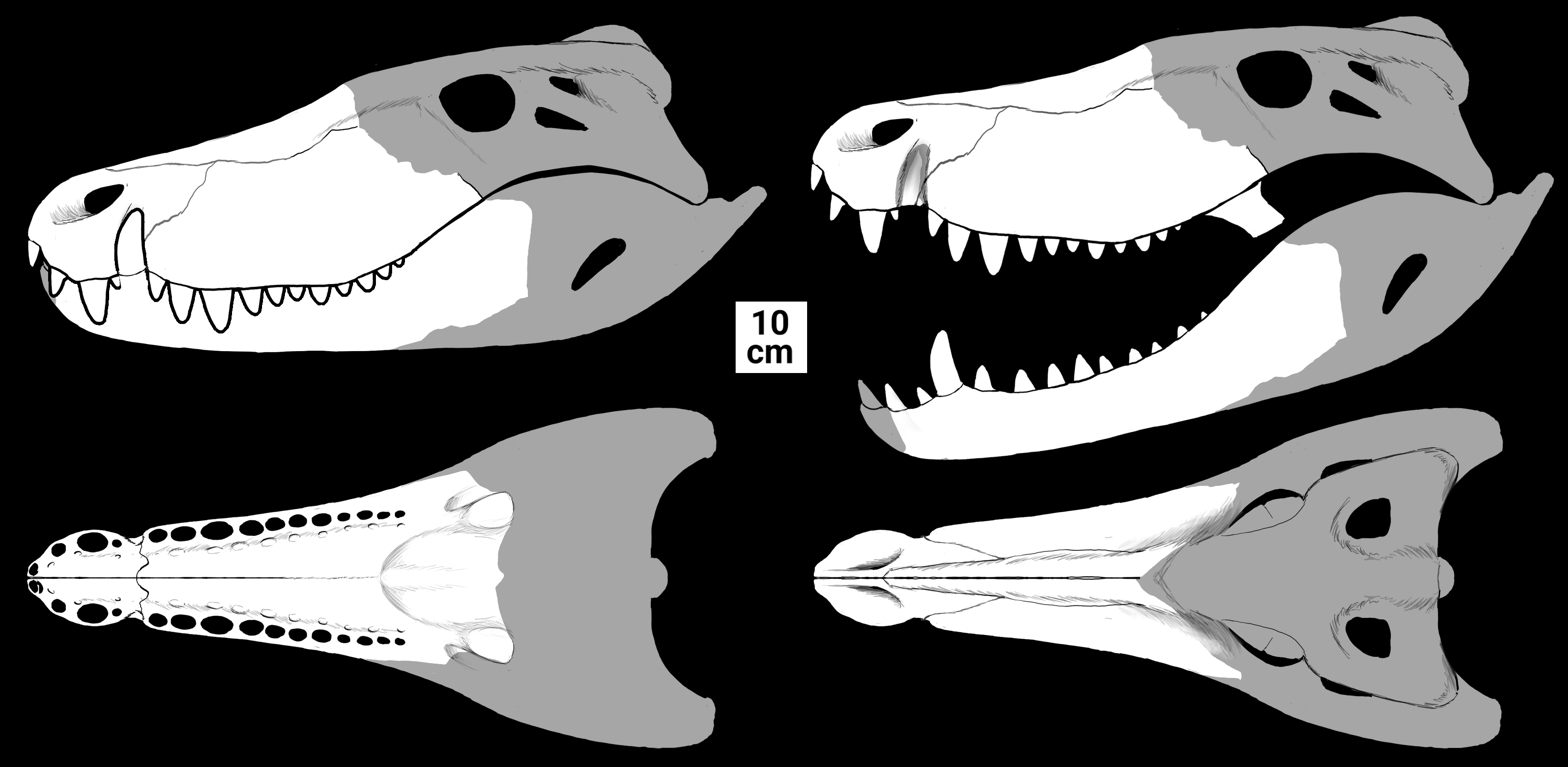
Reconstructed skull, showing known elements of Barinasuchus, between the Venezuelan holotype skull, and the snout from Peru.

The holotype skull, as preserved and measured from the anterior tip of the rostrum to the posterior (rear) end of the damaged surangular, measures 70 cm (28 in) in length, and 41 cm (16 in) in height. Based on these dimensions, Barinasuchus likely had a total skull length of about 1 m (39 in). This would make it the largest skull of any sebecosuchian; that of Bretesuchus was the second largest, measuring 66 cm (26 in) as preserved. Its rostrum was tall and laterally compressed, a condition which, in crocodyliforms, is referred to as being oreinirostral. This condition is similar to that of most other sebecids, including such as Langstonia and Sebecus (with the exception of Sahitisuchus). The nasals are curved, forming a narrow dome shape. Like Ogresuchus and Sebecus, the perinarial fossa (a depression on the lower margin of the nasal opening) was slightly larger than in other sebecids. Barinasuchus' premaxillae were short and high, and their junction with the maxilla bore a prominent notch, which accommodated the fourth mandibular tooth. The maxillae were fairly short, and were very high posteriorly. The pterygoid cavity was large and concave, and was broader posteriorly. The basisphenoids, two bones that lay between the basioccipital and presphenoid bones, were strongly compressed. While the palatine-pterygoid region is poorly known in most other sebecids, it has been noted that Barinasuchus shares with Bretesuchus and Sebecus a palatine bone morphology wherein they were proportionally short, and choanae (internal nostrils) which opened at the roof of a deep cavity in the anterior (front) portion of the pterygoid.

Barinasuchus' mandible (lower jaw) was very robust, and its describers noted that the condition seen in this genus was the precise opposite of that seen in Sebecus icaeorhinus. While they believed its mandible could be differentiated from that of other sebecids by the presence of a series of deep pits in the vicinity of the mandibular symphysis, such structures are observed in several other sebecids and non-sebecid sebecosuchians, including baurusuchids and peirosaurids. The mandible of Barinasuchus was almost round at the front, though changed shape posteriorly. The alveolar process, the part of the mandible which bore teeth, was widest and highest at the base of the fourth mandibular tooth. The dorsal (top) surface of the mandibular symphysis bore a shallow, subcylindrical canal. The splenial bones contributed to the symphysis ventrally (at the bottom).

Whereas many sebecids had fairly small teeth and a high tooth count, Barinasuchus and Dentaneosuchus had a condition more similar to baurusuchids, in which the teeth are reduced in number and hypertrophied. Barinasuchus' dentition was heterodont, meaning that multiple tooth morphologies were present. The teeth of the premaxilla and the anterior portion of the maxilla are more conical than those of the posterior portion of the maxilla, which are shorter and more laterally compressed. All of the teeth were laterally compressed, particularly those of the posterior maxilla. The fourth mandibular tooth was the largest (out of both upper and lower jaws), and was curved. Due to how the holotype of Barinasuchus is preserved, the lower dentition, beyond the fourth mandibular tooth, is not known.

== Classification ==
In their 2007 paper describing Barinasuchus, Alfredo Paolillo and Omar J. Linares suggested that Barinasuchus may have descended from Sebecus (or from an as-yet unknown close relative of Sebecus), based on dentition, body size, the compression of the nasal and maxillary bones, and the angle of the snout. In 2014, Diego Pol and his colleagues performed a phylogenetic analysis which integrating many of the new genera and species of crocodyliforms found throughout the late 2000s–early 2010s. They compiled the datasets of various phylogenetic studies in order to make a matrix that included 109 genera of crocodyliforms, of which 412 morphological characteristics were studied. Notosuchia, according to Diego Pol and colleagues includes 45 genera and 54 species. In their analysis, Barinasuchus was recovered as a sebecosuchian belonging to the family Sebecidae, close to Lorosuchus but nesting as a sister taxon to Ayllusuchus and Bretesuchus. If this were the case, Barinasuchus would belong to a basal sebecid lineage. In another analysis published that year, Barinasuchus was recovered as the most basal sebecid genus.

The below cladogram is based on the study results of Kellner and colleagues (2014):

- - - Chimaerasuchus
    - Sphagesaurus
  - Sebecosuchia
    - Pehuenchesuchus
    - - Baurusuchidae
        - - Pabwehshi
          - Stratiotosuchus
        - Baurusuchus
      - - Cynodontosuchus
        - - - Bergisuchus
            - Iberosuchus
          - Sebecidae
            - Barinasuchus
            - - Lorosuchus
              - - - Ayllusuchus
                  - Bretesuchus
                - Lumbrera's Form
                - Langstonia
                - Sahitisuchus
                - Sebecus
                - Zulmasuchus

In 2023, Jeremy E. Martin and colleagues published their paper describing Dentaneosuchus. In that paper, they recovered Barinasuchus in a more derived position within Sebecidae, as the sister taxon to a clade comprising the so-called Lumbrera form, Ogresuchus, Sebecus, and Zulmasuchus. The below cladogram reflects the 2023 results of Martin and colleagues:

- Sebecosuchia
  - Baurusuchidae
  - Sebecidae
    - Dentaneosuchus crassiproratus
    - - - Iberosuchus macrodon
        - Bergisuchus dietrichbergi
      - - - Ayllusuchus fernandezi
          - Bretesuchus bonapartei
        - - Barinasuchus arveloi
          - - Ogresuchus furatus
            - - Lumbrera form
              - Zulmasuchus querejazus
              - Sebecus icaeorhinus
              - Sebecus huilensis

In 2025, Gonzalo Gabriel Bravo and colleagues recovered Barinasuchus as the sister taxon to a clade consisting entirely of the Lumbrera form and Sebecus species.

== Palaeoecology ==
Although most early Cenozoic ecosystems were dominated by large mammalian carnivores, some ecosystems in the immediate aftermath and for a considerable time following the end-Cretaceous mass extinction (especially in Europe and South America) appear instead to have been dominated by predatory sauropsids. The Eocene of Europe, for example, had early sebecids, the cariamiform bird Eleutherornis (a possible phorusrhacid), and planiocraniid crocodilians such as Boverisuchus, though a large mammalian carnivore, in the form of the hyaenodont Kerberos, was present. In South America, the predator guild for much of the Cenozoic prominently included both mammalian and non-mammalian predators, such as sparassodont metatherians (relatives of modern marsupials), large flightless phorusrhachid "terror birds", sebecids like Barinasuchus, and snakes. Up to around the middle Miocene, when the later specimens of Barinasuchus lived, the northern South American predatory guild was mostly non-mammalian, with many constituent taxa being reptiles and especially archosaurs. Notable, though mostly aquatic examples are the Palaeocene snake Titanoboa, the Miocene turtle Stupendemys, (Note: It has since been suggested that Stupendemys was more generalistic in its dietary habits, and that it was may have been partly frugivorous, though a carnivorous diet has not been discounted.) and the Miocene crocodilians Brachygnathosuchus—although that taxon might be Pliocene—Gryposuchus, and Purussaurus. Only three definite sebecosuchians of similar size are known: one, Dentaneosuchus, lived in Europe and became extinct in the Eocene; the second, Bretesuchus, was also South American and lived during the Palaeocene; the third, Langstonia, was contemporaneous with Barinasuchus and also lived in South America. All of these taxa appear to have been apex predators.

=== Palaeoenvironments ===
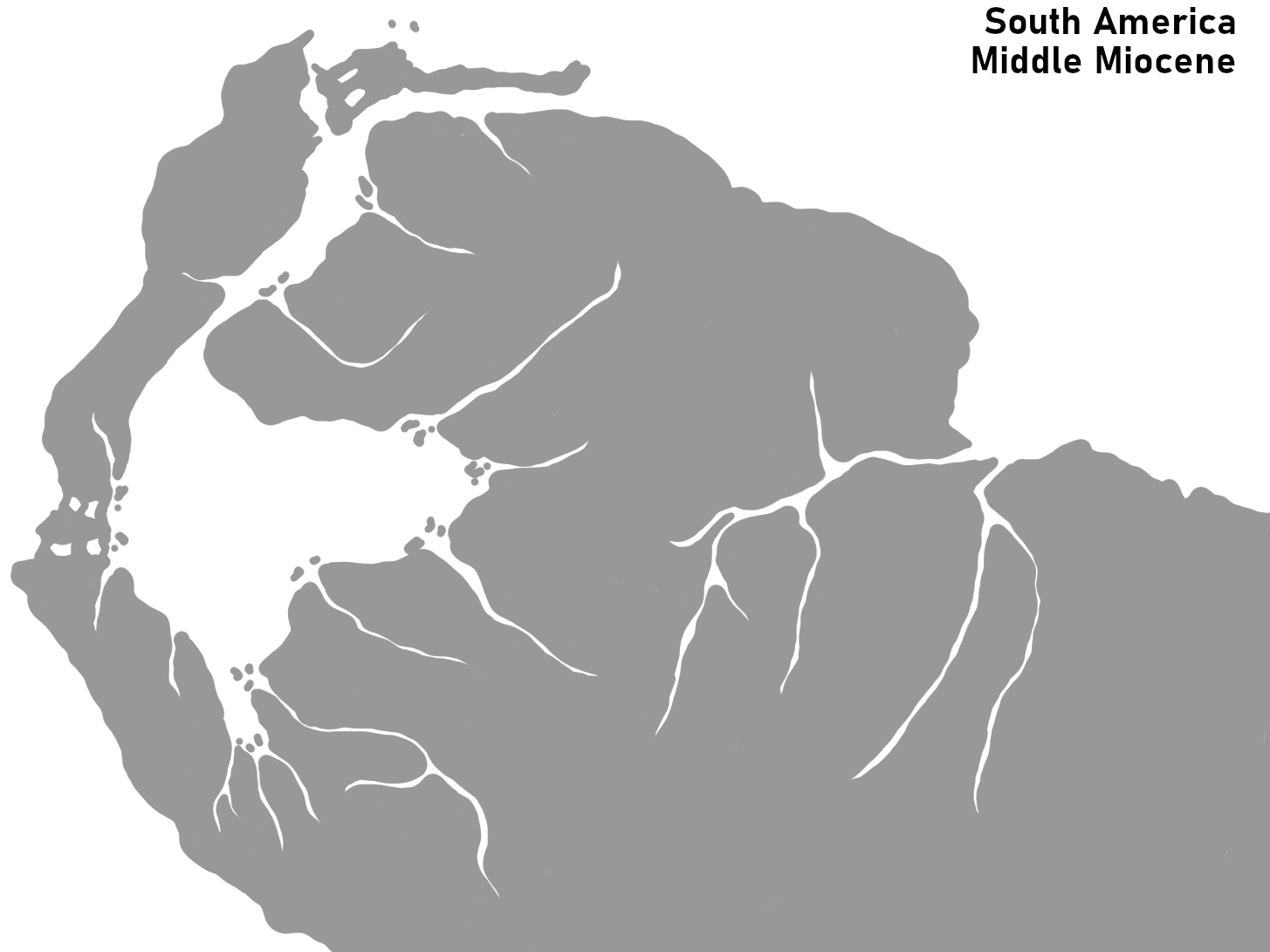
Map of South America during the middle Miocene (ca. 23 - 10 Ma), showcasing the Pebas Mega-Wetland

During the Middle Miocene, much of the northern part of South America, especially what is now the western Amazon, was dominated by the Pebas Mega-Wetland, or Pebas System, an expanse of lakes and poorly oxygenated marshlands with an area of roughly 390,000 sq mi (1,000,000 km^{2}), formed by the uplifting of the northern Andes. It is the Pebas Mega-Wetland and adjacent regions which Barinasuchus would have inhabited, at least during the Miocene. The holotype of Barinasuchus was recovered from strata belonging to the upper part of the Parángula Formation, dating to the lower middle Miocene. The area from which it was recovered do not otherwise bear fossils, and the closest fossiliferous Parángula Formation site is on the bank of the Tucupido River, about 28 mi (45 km) northeast; while often interpreted as belonging instead to the overlying Río Yuca Formation, Alfredo Paolill and Omar J. Linares instead interpreted them as being part of the Parángula. The strata in question were deposited in a fluvial (river) environment, and preserve the remains of crocodiles, turtles, and a ground sloth, Pseudoprepotherium venezualanum. The Ipururo Formation stratum from which the other Miocene specimen of Barinasuchus is known is more fossiliferous, preserving the astrapotherian mammals Granastrapotherium cf. snorki and Xenastrapotherium sp., the IN-DTC site further preserves the toxodont Pericotoxodon cf. platignathus, and three xenarthrans: a mylodontid ground sloth, an indeterminate glyptodont, and the extinct armadillo Neoglyptatelus. The mid-Eocene Divisadero Largo Formation, from which the earliest Barinasuchus specimen is known, was similarly deposited in a shallow lacustrine environment. It preserves the allothere Groeberia, the notoungulates Acamana, Adiantoides, Allalmeia, Brachystephanus, Phoradiadius, Trigonostylops, and Xenostephanus, and another sebecid, Ilchunaia that it likely preyed upon.

=== Extinction ===
It is possible that the continued presence of large archosaurian predators in South America was due, at least in part, to a lack of competition, as borhyaenid sparassodonts may have represented the only form of serious competition until the diversification of phorusrhacids and thylacosmilids; however, a 2022 study by Sergio Daniel Tarquini and colleagues concluded that sparassodonts may not have meaningfully competed with other large native predator clades. The dominance of large reptiles in Europe, at least, had subsided by the Bartonian stage of the Eocene. Increased competition, reduction in prey availability, and environmental changes have all been suggested as causes for the eventual extinction of South American sebecids. However, a study of the La Venta palaeoenvironment, wherein Langstonia was an apex predator, suggested that giant sebecids would have faced little competition from mammalian carnivores, and that sebecids may have been the only major source of predatory pressures faced by the large mammals of the time. It is possible that changes in the Pebas Mega-Wetland may have led to terminal ecological disruption; as apex predators are particularly susceptible to major environmental changes, this may have been responsible for their extinction, along with the other large crocodilians of the Miocene. Fossils from Hispanola possibly attributable to Sebecus suggest that sebecids persisted in places such as the West Indies for several million years after their extinction on the mainland.
