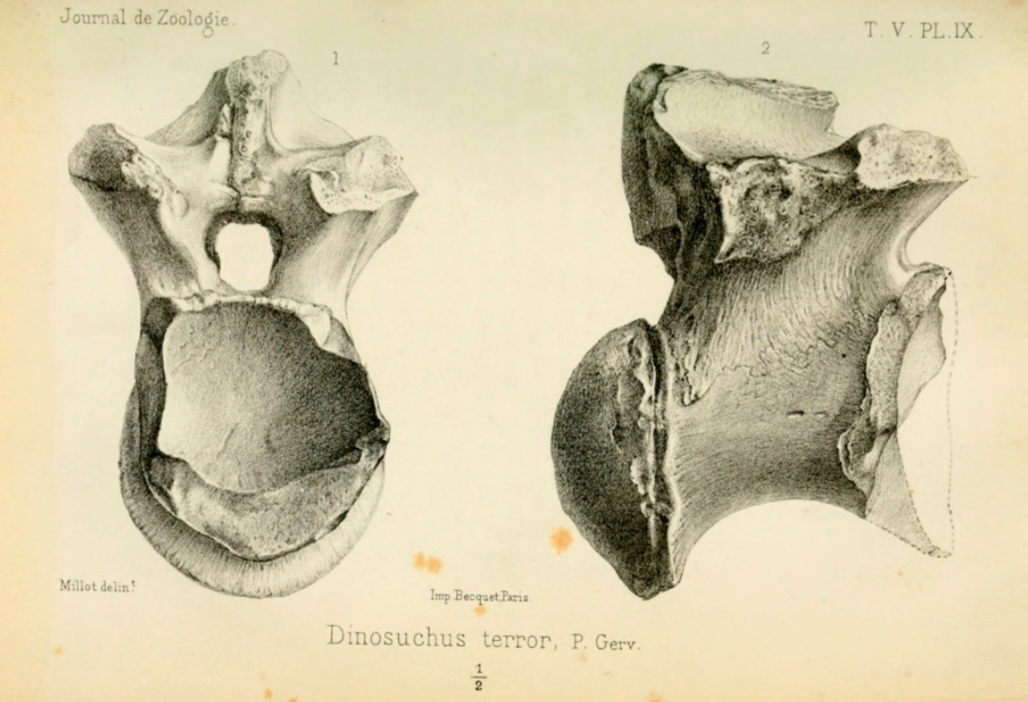

Scientific classification
- Kingdom: Animalia
- Phylum: Chordata
- Class: Reptilia
- Clade: Archosauria
- Order: Crocodilia
- Family: Alligatoridae
- Genus: †Dinosuchus; Gervais, 1876
- Species: †D. terror

Binomial name
- †Dinosuchus terror Gervais, 1876

= Dinosuchus =

Dinosuchus Temporal range: Late Miocene-Late Pliocene (Montehermosan-Uquian) ~5.332–2.588 Ma

Extinct genus of crocodilians

Dinosuchus is a genus of extinct alligatorid crocodilian. It was very large compared to other alligatorids, save for the giant caiman Purussaurus and its closest relatives. The genus was first described in 1876 on the basis of a vertebra from the Brazilian Amazon, the type species being named D. terror. In 1921, a new species of Dinosuchus, D. neivensis, was named based on a large mandible that was discovered in Colombia. D. neivensis was later found to be synonymous with both Brachygnathosuchus braziliensis and Purussaurus brasiliensis, being reassigned in 1924 to the senior synonym P. brasiliensis. In 1965, D. terror was proposed to be a nomen vanum. In 1936, Robert Broom used the name Dinosuchus for a dinocephalian therapsid from South Africa. Broom's Dinosuchus is now considered a junior synonym of Anteosaurus.

The name Dinosuchus means "terrible crocodile" in Greek. It is not to be confused with Deinosuchus, a large non-crocodilian Eusuchian from Late Cretaceous North America.
