= Parángula Formation =

Geologic formation in Venezuela

- Stratigraphic range: Oligocene–Miocene
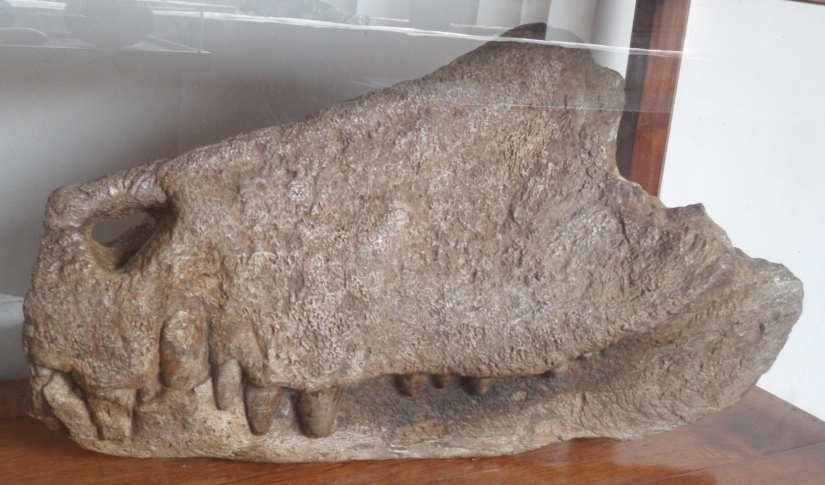
- Holotype of Barinasuchus arveloi, recovered from the Parángula Formation
- Type: Geological formation
- Underlies: Río Yuca Formation
- Overlies: El Mene Formation
- Thickness: 550–1,600 m

Lithology
- Primary: Sandstone
- Other: Shales, claystones

Location
- Approximate paleocoordinates: 9.3°N 66.1°W
- Region: Barina, Portuguesa
- Country: Venezuela

Type section
- Named for: Quebrada Parángula
- Named by: Mackenzie, 1937
- Parángula Formation (Venezuela)

The Parángula Formation is a lithostratigraphic unit in the states of Barinas and Portuguesa in Venezuela. It was deposited from the Oligocene to the Miocene.

== Research history ==
The Parángula Formation was first published about by A. N. Mackenzie in 1937, who used the name in reference to a series of sandstones, conglomerates, and mottled clays from the Parángula ravine. In 1946, a further description of the formation's geology was published by R. A. Liddle. In 1960, a thorough description of the stratigraphy of the Parángula Formation was published by G. R. Pierce. Pierce attempted to emend the name of the formation, renaming it to the Parángulo Formation, though this was unsuccessful.

== Description ==
=== Stratigraphy ===
The lowermost layers of the Parángula Formation, those overlying the "El Mene" Formation, were deposited in the Oligocene epoch, whereas the uppermost layers, those underlying the Río Yuca Formation, were deposited in the Miocene. The surface layers of the Parángula Formation consist predominantly of coarse lenticular conglomerates, fine-grained sandstones deposited in massive layers, limonites, and mudstones, which may be red, reddish-brown, brown, or purple in colour. The layer immediately below the surface is similar but lacks conglomerates. Below that is a layer of basal sandstone, with certain elements, such as the presence of small amounts of glauconite, which suggest influence from marine sediments. Upper layers show a gradual increase in sand deposition, a likely result of debris accumulated from the uplifting of the Andes.

=== Depositional environment ===
The uppermost strata of the Parángula Formation were likely deposited in a brackish environment. Certain portions of the upper Parángula Formation, such as the Tucupido River site (sometimes interpreted as part of the overlying Río Yuca Formation) show signs of fluvial (river) deposition. The Lexico Estratigrafico de Venezuela suggests that the depositional environment of the upper Parángula Formation was partly marine and may have sported mangrove swamps.

== Fossils ==
The Parángula Formation preserves a number of microfossils, many suggested to have been reworked from middle Eocene strata. Fragmentary remains from small mammals, turtles, and caimans have been reported from the upper strata. Two named taxa from different localities are found in the Parángula Formation, both from the upper Miocene. One is a ground sloth, Pseudoprepotherium venezualanum, recovered on the banks of the Tucupido River in Portuguesa; the other is a species of very large sebecid crocodyliform, Barinasuchus arveloi, whose type specimen was recovered near a tributary of the Rio Masporro River during the construction of a road, and which was largely destroyed in the process.
