= Praia de Vale Furado =

Portuguese location

- Beach
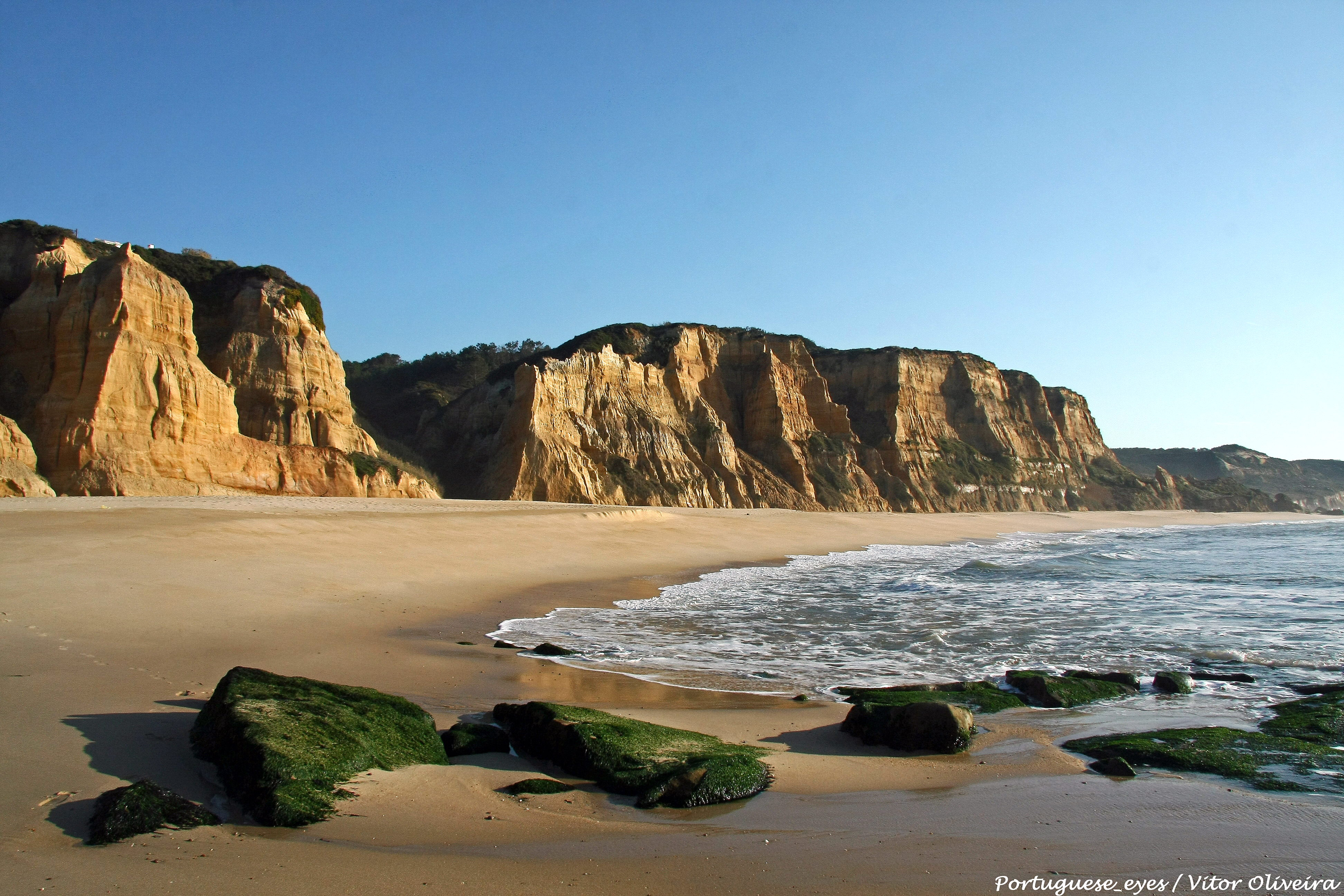
- Praia de Vale Furado

- Location of Praia de Vale Furado in Portugal
- Coordinates: 39°41′0″N 9°03′29″W
- Location: Pataias, Leiria, Portugal

Praia de Vale Furado is a beach located in Pataias, Leiria District, in central Portugal, roughly between Nazaré and São Pedro de Moel. The beach is part of the Portuguese Costa de Prata and is renowned not only for its sandstone cliffs but also its geological heritage: part of the Feligueira Grande formation, the extinct genus of Iberosuchus, a mesoeucrocodylian, was first described here in 1975, a tapir (Paralophiodon cf. leptorhynchum) was also found in addition to other unidentified crocodiles, chelonians and small mammals.
