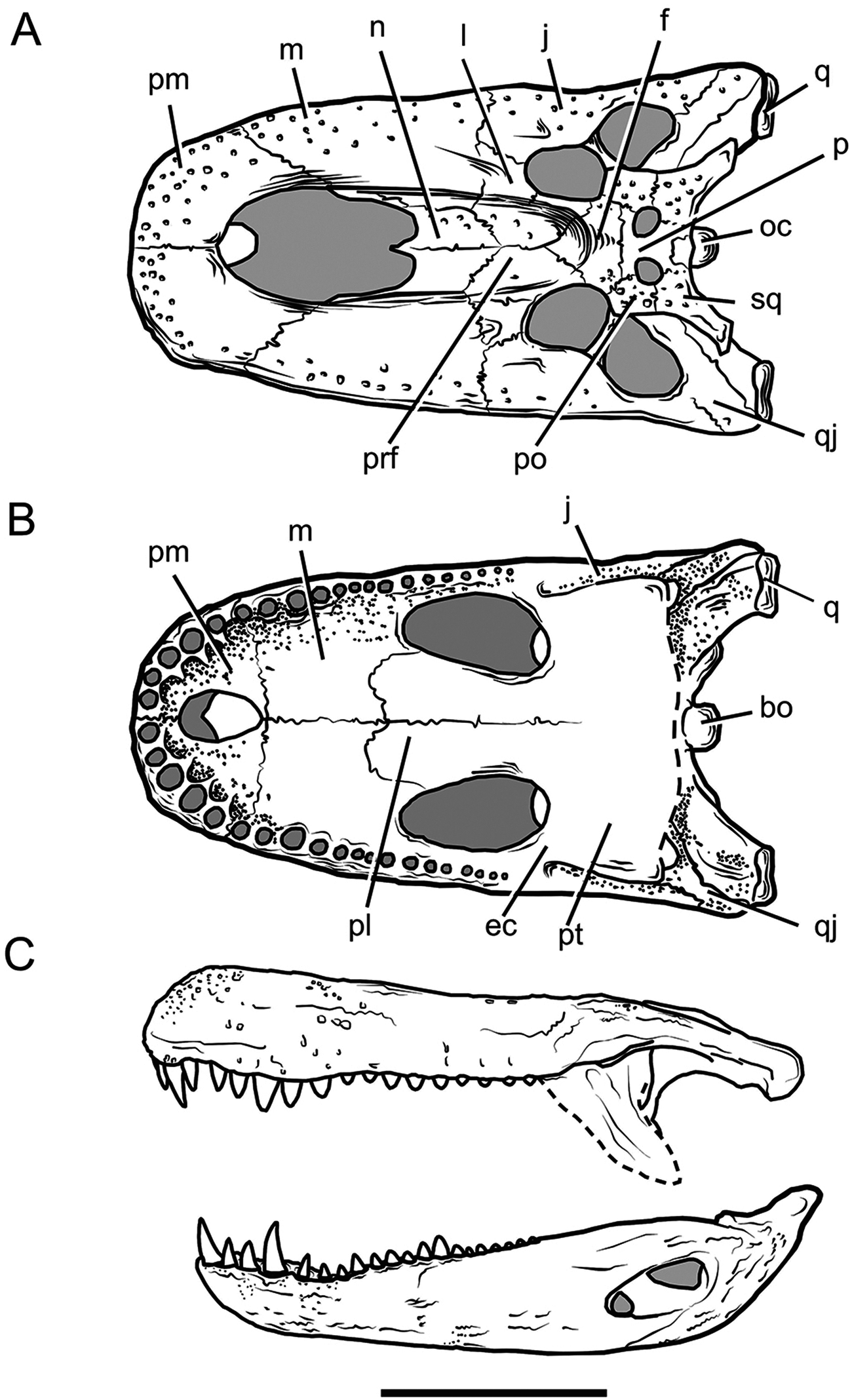
- Skull restoration of P. brasiliensis

Scientific classification
- Kingdom: Animalia
- Phylum: Chordata
- Class: Reptilia
- Order: Crocodylia
- Family: Alligatoridae
- Subfamily: Caimaninae
- Clade: Jacarea
- Genus: †Purussaurus; Rodrigues, 1892

Species
- †P. brasiliensis (type species) Barbosa-Rodrigues, 1892; †P. neivensis Mook, 1941; †P. mirandai Aguilera et al., 2006

Synonyms
- Dinosuchus neivensis Langston, 1965

= Purussaurus =

Purussaurus Temporal range: Miocene (Friasian-Huayquerian), 16–5.3 Ma

Extinct genus of reptiles

Purussaurus is a genus of extinct giant caimans that lived in the Americas during the Miocene epoch, from the Friasian to the Huayquerian in the SALMA classification. It is known from skull material found in the Brazilian and Peruvian Amazon, Argentina, Colombian Villavieja Formation, Panamanian Culebra Formation, Urumaco, and Socorro Formations of northern Venezuela.

== Description ==
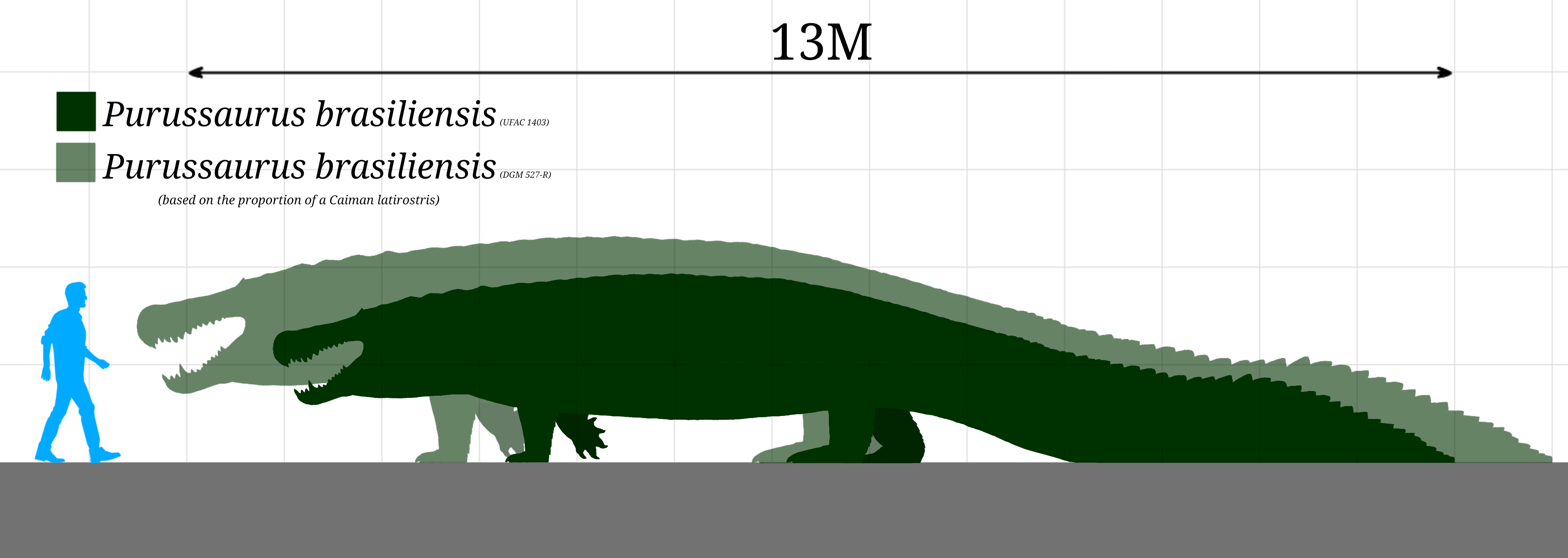
Size comparisons of estimates of P. brasiliensis.

One of the largest known skull specimen (UFAC 1403) of the type species, P. brasiliensis, is measured up to 1.4 m (4.6 ft) in maximal skull length from the tip of the snout to the quadrates. In 2015, Aureliano and colleagues assumed that this maximal skull length is equivalent to the dorsal cranial length (DCL), the skull measurement from the tip of the snout to the back of the skull (occipital/parietal area) along the midline, and estimated a body length of 12.5 m (41 ft), ranging from 9.9 to 15.8 m (32 to 52 ft), and a body mass of 8.4 t (9.3 short tons), ranging from 5.6 to 12.6 t (6.2 to 13.9 short tons), with a mean daily food intake of 40.6 kg (90 lb), ranging from 21.6 to 59.5 kg (48 to 131 lb). However, a comment to the paper by Betancourt criticized the authors' assumption, suggesting that the DCL is probably shorter at 1.22 m (4.0 ft), which would produce a smaller estimate of 10.9 m (36 ft) and 5.6 t (6.2 short tons). According to a 2007 study, the dorsal skull length (DSL) of UFAC 1403 is 1.34 m (4.4 ft), and it has been estimated to have been about 9.5 m (31 ft) long and 4 t (4.4 short tons) in weight. There is also a larger skull (DGM 527-R) not given an estimate in the 2015 study with a length of 1,453 mm (57.2 in) and a mandible length of 1.75 m (5.7 ft) that has been used to produce an estimate of 10.3 m (34 ft) and 5.16 t (5.69 short tons) in the same 2007 study.P. neivensis size has been estimated at 6.5-9 m (21-30 ft) in length and 2 tonnes in weight. A 2022 study also suggested a smaller size estimate, with an estimated length of 7.6–9.3 m (25–31 ft) and mass of 2–6.3 t (2.2–6.9 short tons) using a phylogenetic approach, and an estimated length of 9.3–10 m (31–33 ft) and mass of 3.95–5 t (4.35–5.51 short tons) using a non-phylogenetic approach. A 2025 study, based on head width, estimated that P. brasiliensis reached an average total length of approximately 7.8 metres (26 ft), while P. mirandai and P. neivensis had average body lengths of 6.55 metres (21.5 ft) and 4.58 metres (15.0 ft) respectively, placing P. brasiliensis as the largest crocodilian in the study, even larger than Deinosuchus.^{Supplementary Data 2 Table S1} This would possibly make P. brasiliensis the largest crocodyliform to ever exist.

Bite force has been estimated to be around 69,000 N (around 7 metric tons-force) in 2015; however, Betancourt's comment to the paper criticizing the authors' assumptions also affects the bite force estimate, bringing it down to around 52,500 N (around 5.3 metric tons-force). The large size and estimated strength of this animal appears to have allowed it to include a wide range of prey in its diet, making it an apex predator in its ecosystem. As an adult, it would have preyed upon large to very large vertebrates such as the xenarthrans, notoungulates, and giant turtles present, with no real competition from sympatric, smaller, carnivores. Researchers have proposed that the large size of Purussaurus, though offering many advantages, may also have led to its vulnerability. The constantly changing environment on a large geological scale may have reduced its long-term survival, favoring smaller species more resilient to ecological shifts. In other words, it was over-specialised and could not survive when its habitat changed, unlike smaller related species of caimans.

The skeletal anatomy of P. mirandai shows some adaptations for more upright limb orientation or weight support. Unlike all other members of the crown Crocodylia, which have two sacrals, P. mirandai had three.

The teeth vary between the three species of Purussaurus, but are always around 50 mm (2 in) long and curve slightly backwards. They have small ridges along two of the edges, which resemble those in ziphodonts. This indicates that Purussaurus hunted large vertebrates, as these ridges are used for puncturing and holding onto flesh. The teeth are slightly flattened at the top and are roughly conical, which means that they would have been unlikely to break on impact with a thick bone. Teeth at the anterior are taller and more pointed, whereas those at the posterior are lower and more rounded.

Purussaurus is one of the largest known crocodyliformes ever to have existed. Three other extinct crocodyliformes, Sarcosuchus, Deinosuchus, and Rhamphosuchus, had similar body sizes. Sarcosuchus and Deinosuchus had similar proportions, but both were geologically much older, dating from the Early and Late Cretaceous, respectively. One study also indicates that Purussaurus may have been heavier than either Sarcosuchus or Deinosuchus, as it had a much broader, shorter snout, which would require a thicker, stronger neck to support the larger head. Rhamphosuchus lived around the same time as Purussaurus, but was slightly smaller, had a more gharial-like snout, and lived in India. During the summer of 2005, the Franco-Peruvian Fitzcarrald expedition found new fossils of Purussaurus in the Peruvian Amazon (600 km from Lima). Analysis of a biomechanical model of the skull of Purussaurus indicated that it was capable of performing the "death roll" maneuver used by extant crocodilians to subdue and dismember their prey.

All sense organs (eyes, ears, nostrils) were at the very top of the head, indicating that Purussaurus was an ambush predator like many modern caimans.

== Paleoecology ==
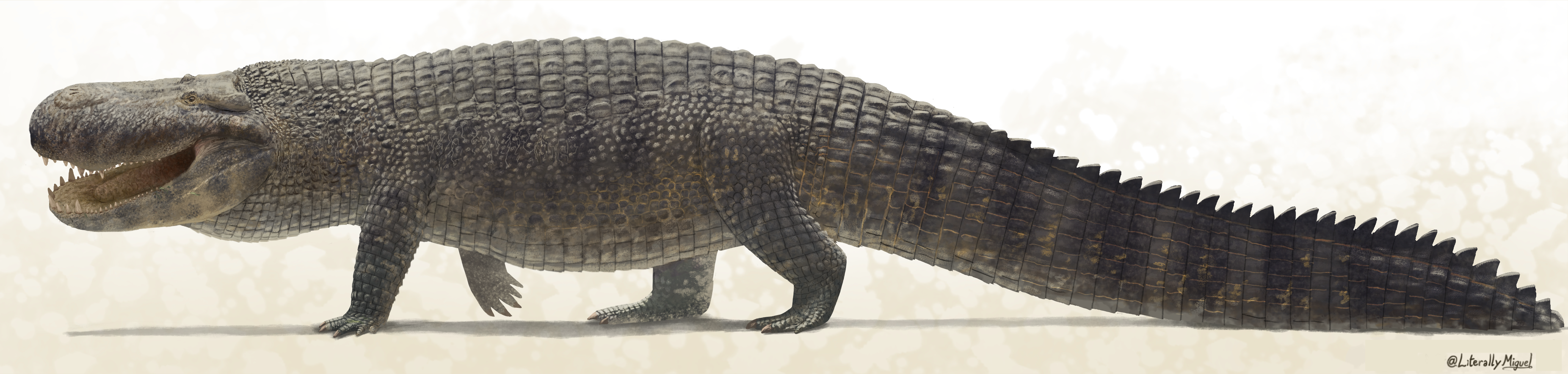
Life reconstruction

The diet of Purussaurus likely included the extinct turtle Stupendemys, crocodilians including Charactosuchus, Gryposuchus, and Mourasuchus, Anhinga birds, and mammals including: sloths, bats, rodents related to the modern capybara (Josephoartigasia) weighing up to 700 kg (1540 lb), the primate Stirtonia, and river dolphins. Rivers, floodplains, and lake environments were present. Marine and freshwater fish, turtles, crocodilians, and terrestrial and aquatic mammals are associated with Venezuelan P. mirandai. Its environment is described as tropical and coastal. The earlier Colombian P. neivensis lived alongside a massive variety of fauna, including astrapotheres such as Granastrapotherium and Xenastrapotherium, the early species of Mourasuchus and Gryposuchus, and the terrestrial crocodyliform Langstonia. Bite marks on the tibia of a phorusrhacid from this locality are consistent with a caimanine, possibly a young individual of Purussaurus, though whether this represents scavenging or active predation is unclear. This fauna dates from 13 million years ago, in the Laventan stage of the Late Miocene.

== Etymology ==
The genus was named for the Purus River, where its fossils were first found, and the Greek word σαύρος (sauros) meaning "reptile" or "lizard".

== Distribution ==
Fossils of Purussaurus have been found in:

Miocene

- Solimões Formation, Brazil
- Honda Group and Castilletes Formation, Colombia
- Culebra Formation, Panama
- Fitzcarrald Arch and Pebas Formation, Peru
- Urumaco Formation, Urumaco and Socorro Formation, Venezuela
- Ituzaingó Formation, Argentina

== See also ==
- Mourasuchus
- Acresuchus
