= Saint-Martin-de-Londres =

- Commune
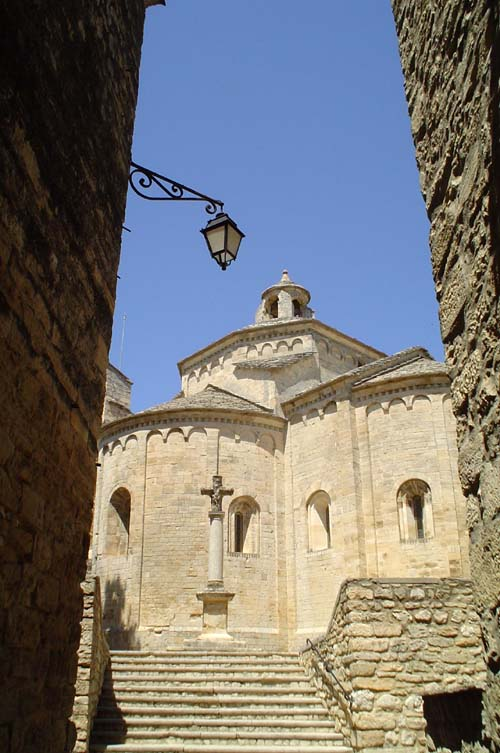
- The church of Saint-Martin-de-Londres

- Coat of arms
- Location of Saint-Martin-de-Londres
- Location within France Location within Occitanie
- Coordinates: 43°47′30″N 3°43′57″E
- Country: France
- Region: Occitania
- Department: Hérault
- Arrondissement: Lodève
- Canton: Lodève

Government
  - Mayor (2020–2026): Gérard Brunel
- Area^{1}: 38.2 km^{2} (14.7 sq mi)
- Elevation: 194 m (636 ft)
- Highest elevation: 488 m (1,601 ft)
- Lowest elevation: 91 m (299 ft)
- Population (2023): 2,696
  - Density: 70.6/km^{2} (183/sq mi)
- Time zone: UTC+01:00 (CET)
  - Summer (DST): UTC+02:00 (CEST)
- INSEE/Postal code: 34274 /34380
- ^{1} French Land Register data, which excludes lakes, ponds, glaciers > 1 km^{2} (0.386 sq mi or 247 acres) and river estuaries.

Saint-Martin-de-Londres (French pronunciation: [sɛ̃ maʁtɛ̃ də lɔ̃dʁ]; Occitan: Sant Martin de Londras) is a commune in the Hérault department in the Occitanie region in southern France.

== Geography ==
=== Climate ===
Saint-Martin-de-Londres has a mediterranean climate (Köppen climate classification Csa). The average annual temperature in Saint-Martin-de-Londres is 13.5 °C (56.3 °F). The average annual rainfall is 1,075.6 mm (42.35 in) with October as the wettest month. The temperatures are highest on average in July, at around 22.7 °C (72.9 °F), and lowest in January, at around 5.5 °C (41.9 °F). The highest temperature ever recorded in Saint-Martin-de-Londres was 42.5 °C (108.5 °F) on 1 August 1947; the coldest temperature ever recorded was −29.0 °C (−20.2 °F) on 4 February 1963.

Climate data for Saint-Martin-de-Londres (1981–2010 averages, extremes 1947−present)
Month	Jan	Feb	Mar	Apr	May	Jun	Jul	Aug	Sep	Oct	Nov	Dec	Year
Record high °C (°F)	21.8 (71.2)	25.0 (77.0)	27.8 (82.0)	32.0 (89.6)	35.0 (95.0)	41.8 (107.2)	41.2 (106.2)	42.5 (108.5)	37.0 (98.6)	33.4 (92.1)	25.7 (78.3)	21.2 (70.2)	42.5 (108.5)
Mean daily maximum °C (°F)	10.7 (51.3)	11.8 (53.2)	15.1 (59.2)	17.6 (63.7)	21.7 (71.1)	26.5 (79.7)	30.0 (86.0)	29.7 (85.5)	25.0 (77.0)	19.5 (67.1)	14.3 (57.7)	11.2 (52.2)	19.5 (67.1)
Daily mean °C (°F)	5.5 (41.9)	6.1 (43.0)	9.2 (48.6)	11.8 (53.2)	15.7 (60.3)	19.7 (67.5)	22.7 (72.9)	22.4 (72.3)	18.3 (64.9)	14.3 (57.7)	9.2 (48.6)	6.2 (43.2)	13.5 (56.3)
Mean daily minimum °C (°F)	0.2 (32.4)	0.5 (32.9)	3.2 (37.8)	6.0 (42.8)	9.6 (49.3)	12.9 (55.2)	15.4 (59.7)	15.1 (59.2)	11.7 (53.1)	9.1 (48.4)	4.1 (39.4)	1.2 (34.2)	7.5 (45.5)
Record low °C (°F)	−19.0 (−2.2)	−29.0 (−20.2)	−15.0 (5.0)	−6.1 (21.0)	−2.5 (27.5)	2.0 (35.6)	5.2 (41.4)	4.0 (39.2)	−1.0 (30.2)	−5.0 (23.0)	−9.6 (14.7)	−16.5 (2.3)	−29.0 (−20.2)
Average precipitation mm (inches)	90.8 (3.57)	79.5 (3.13)	62.5 (2.46)	91.1 (3.59)	78.6 (3.09)	53.8 (2.12)	26.1 (1.03)	52.7 (2.07)	123.6 (4.87)	163.4 (6.43)	127.2 (5.01)	126.3 (4.97)	1,075.6 (42.35)
Average precipitation days (≥ 1.0 mm)	6.7	5.6	5.4	7.1	7.3	5.3	3.2	4.2	5.8	9.2	7.4	7.2	74.3
Source: Meteociel

== Population ==
Historical population
Year	Pop.	±% p.a.
1968	710	—
1975	720	+0.20%
1982	1,065	+5.75%
1990	1,623	+5.41%
1999	1,894	+1.73%
2007	2,159	+1.65%
2012	2,576	+3.59%
2017	2,755	+1.35%
2023	2,696	−0.36%
Source: INSEE

== See also ==
- Communes of the Hérault department
