= La Livinière =

- Commune
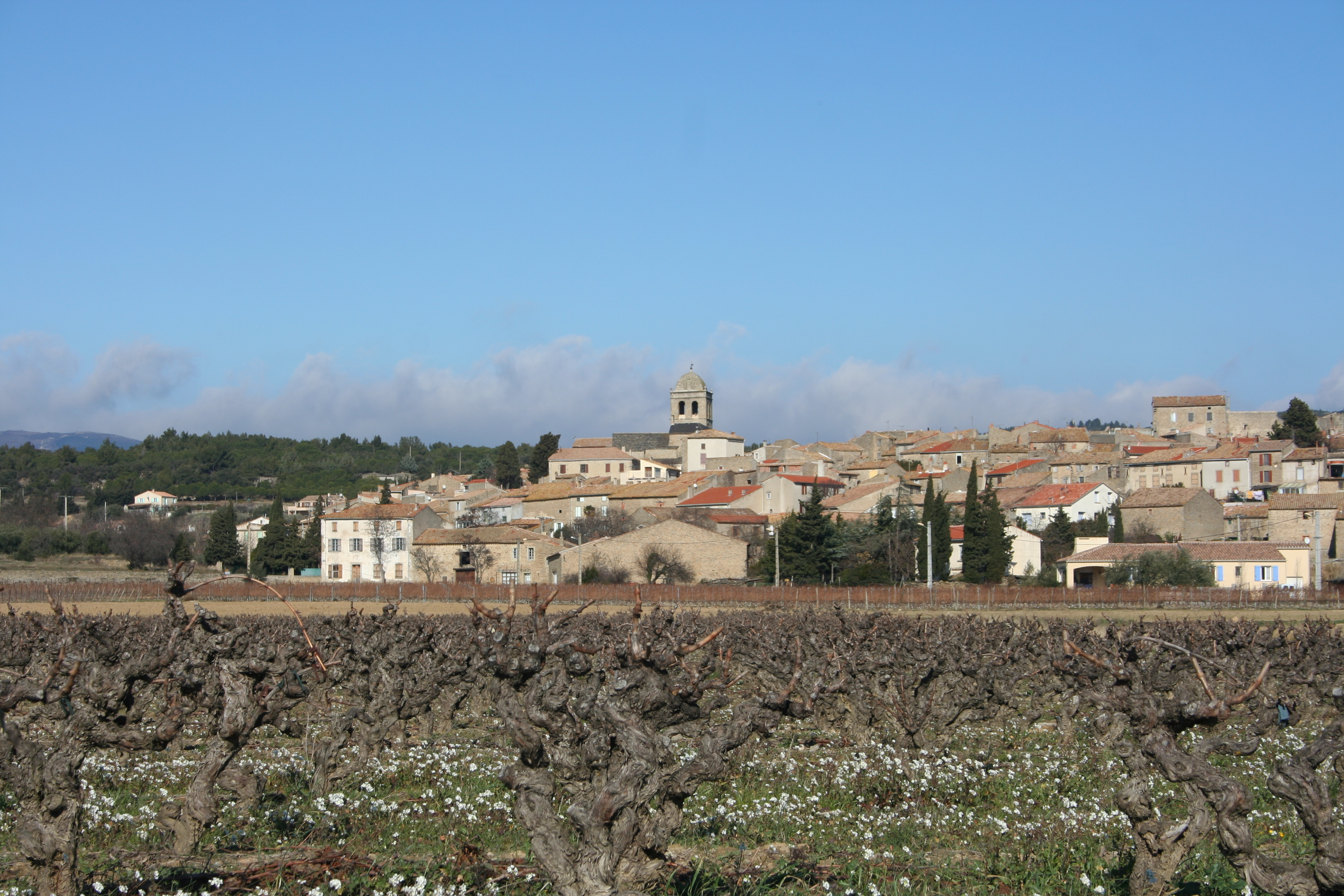
- La Laviniere seen from a vineyard

- Coat of arms
- Location of La Livinière
- Location within France Location within Occitanie
- Coordinates: 43°19′00″N 2°38′14″E
- Country: France
- Region: Occitania
- Department: Hérault
- Arrondissement: Béziers
- Canton: Saint-Pons-de-Thomières

Government
  - Mayor (2020–2026): Pierre-André Pedesseau
- Area^{1}: 31.56 km^{2} (12.19 sq mi)
- Elevation: 153 m (502 ft)
- Highest elevation: 598 m (1,962 ft)
- Lowest elevation: 90 m (300 ft)
- Population (2023): 530
  - Density: 17/km^{2} (43/sq mi)
- Time zone: UTC+01:00 (CET)
  - Summer (DST): UTC+02:00 (CEST)
- INSEE/Postal code: 34141 /34210
- ^{1} French Land Register data, which excludes lakes, ponds, glaciers > 1 km^{2} (0.386 sq mi or 247 acres) and river estuaries.

La Livinière (French pronunciation: [la livinjɛʁ]; Occitan: La Livinièra) is a commune in the Hérault département in the Occitanie region in southern France.

== Geography ==
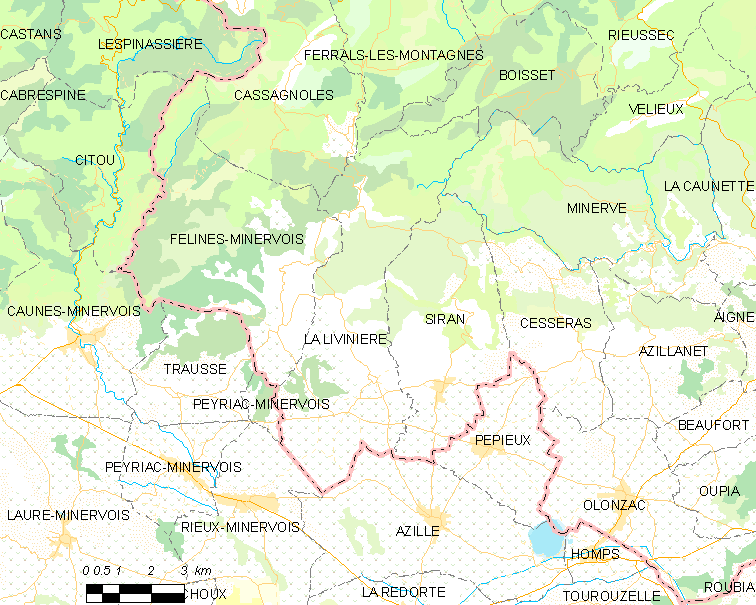
Map

=== Climate ===
La Livinière has a mediterranean climate (Köppen climate classification Csa). The average annual temperature in La Livinière is 14.8 °C (58.6 °F). The average annual rainfall is 650.6 mm (25.61 in) with November as the wettest month. The temperatures are highest on average in July, at around 23.4 °C (74.1 °F), and lowest in January, at around 7.2 °C (45.0 °F). The highest temperature ever recorded in La Livinière was 41.8 °C (107.2 °F) on 13 August 2003; the coldest temperature ever recorded was −8.0 °C (17.6 °F) on 12 December 2012.

Climate data for La Livinière (1981–2010 averages, extremes 1992−2014)
Month	Jan	Feb	Mar	Apr	May	Jun	Jul	Aug	Sep	Oct	Nov	Dec	Year
Record high °C (°F)	21.4 (70.5)	24.0 (75.2)	27.6 (81.7)	32.6 (90.7)	35.5 (95.9)	41.0 (105.8)	40.8 (105.4)	41.8 (107.2)	36.0 (96.8)	31.6 (88.9)	25.2 (77.4)	20.0 (68.0)	41.8 (107.2)
Mean daily maximum °C (°F)	10.9 (51.6)	12.4 (54.3)	15.6 (60.1)	18.0 (64.4)	22.4 (72.3)	26.8 (80.2)	29.6 (85.3)	29.4 (84.9)	24.7 (76.5)	20.0 (68.0)	14.5 (58.1)	11.3 (52.3)	19.7 (67.5)
Daily mean °C (°F)	7.2 (45.0)	8.1 (46.6)	10.7 (51.3)	13.0 (55.4)	17.1 (62.8)	20.9 (69.6)	23.4 (74.1)	23.3 (73.9)	19.3 (66.7)	15.7 (60.3)	10.6 (51.1)	7.7 (45.9)	14.8 (58.6)
Mean daily minimum °C (°F)	3.6 (38.5)	3.8 (38.8)	5.9 (42.6)	8.1 (46.6)	11.8 (53.2)	15.1 (59.2)	17.3 (63.1)	17.2 (63.0)	13.8 (56.8)	11.4 (52.5)	6.6 (43.9)	4.1 (39.4)	9.9 (49.8)
Record low °C (°F)	−6.5 (20.3)	−8.0 (17.6)	−8.0 (17.6)	−1.3 (29.7)	2.0 (35.6)	7.8 (46.0)	9.2 (48.6)	9.0 (48.2)	5.0 (41.0)	−1.4 (29.5)	−7.5 (18.5)	−8.0 (17.6)	−8.0 (17.6)
Average precipitation mm (inches)	62.7 (2.47)	48.2 (1.90)	30.3 (1.19)	65.0 (2.56)	52.3 (2.06)	37.5 (1.48)	22.3 (0.88)	45.8 (1.80)	65.1 (2.56)	76.7 (3.02)	80.4 (3.17)	64.3 (2.53)	650.6 (25.61)
Average precipitation days (≥ 1.0 mm)	7.8	6.2	6.5	7.5	6.4	4.2	3.0	4.5	5.2	6.5	6.9	7.0	71.5
Source: Meteociel

== Population ==
Historical population
Year	Pop.	±% p.a.
1968	682	—
1975	567	−2.60%
1982	512	−1.45%
1990	506	−0.15%
1999	588	+1.68%
2007	553	−0.76%
2012	550	−0.11%
2017	532	−0.66%
2023	530	−0.06%
Source: INSEE

== See also ==
- Communes of the Hérault department
