= Brachygnathosuchus =

Brachygnathosuchus Temporal range: ?Pliocene

Scientific classification
- Domain: Eukaryota
- Kingdom: Animalia
- Phylum: Chordata
- Class: Reptilia
- Clade: Archosauria
- Clade: Pseudosuchia
- Clade: Crocodylomorpha
- Clade: Crocodyliformes
- Order: Crocodilia
- Genus: †Brachygnathosuchus; Mook, 1921

Type species
- B. braziliensis Mook, 1921

Extinct genus of reptiles

Brachygnathosuchus is an extinct genus of crocodilian. Fossils have been found from the Upper Purus River in western Brazil. As there were no lithified strata for the original specimen to be correlated with (it was found in the silt of the riverbed), the fossils cannot be dated with any certainty. However, partial remains of different organisms found in the vicinity of the specimen, such as a possible Megamys tooth and a humerus of a megalonychine ground sloth, suggest that they were of Pliocene age. The name Brachygnathosuchus (Greek for "short jawed crocodile") refers to its characteristically broad, stout mandible, unusual among crocodilians. The holotype specimen was referred to Crocodilia on the basis of a partial right ramus of the lower jaw consisting of a portion of a very large dentary bone. The bone differs from those of other related fossil and modern crocodilians and was originally said to resemble that of a dinosaur. An eroded osteoderm also associated with the specimen provides further evidence for its classification as a crocodilian.
