= Tremp Formation =

Geological formation in Spain

- Stratigraphic range: Maastrichtian-Thanetian; ~67.6–56 Ma
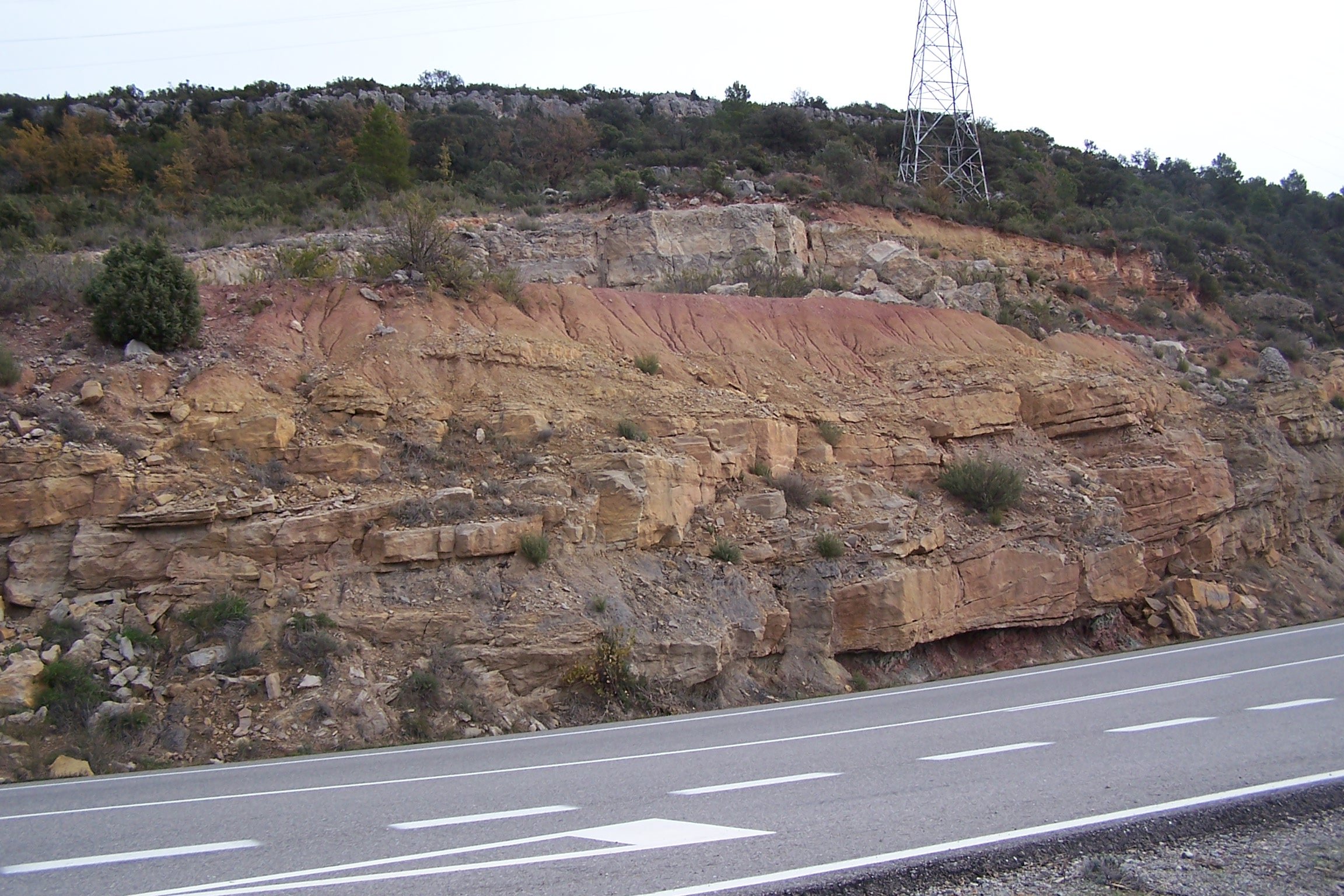
- Outcrop of the Tremp Formation
- Type: Geological formation
- Unit of: Tremp-Graus Basin
- Sub-units: See text
- Underlies: Àger Formation, Alveolina Limestone, alluvium
- Overlies: Arén Formation
- Area: ~325 km^{2} (125 sq mi)
- Thickness: 250–800 m (820–2,620 ft)

Lithology
- Primary: Sandstone, shale, conglomerate, limestone
- Other: Marl, gypsum, siltstone, lignite

Location
- Coordinates: 42°06′35″N 01°04′22″E
- Region: Pre-Pyrenees, Catalonia
- Country: Spain
- Extent: ~35 km (22 mi)

Type section
- Named for: Tremp
- Named by: Mey et al.
- Year defined: 1968
- Approximate paleocoordinates: 34.1°N 0.9°E
- Tremp Formation (Spain) Tremp Formation (Catalonia)

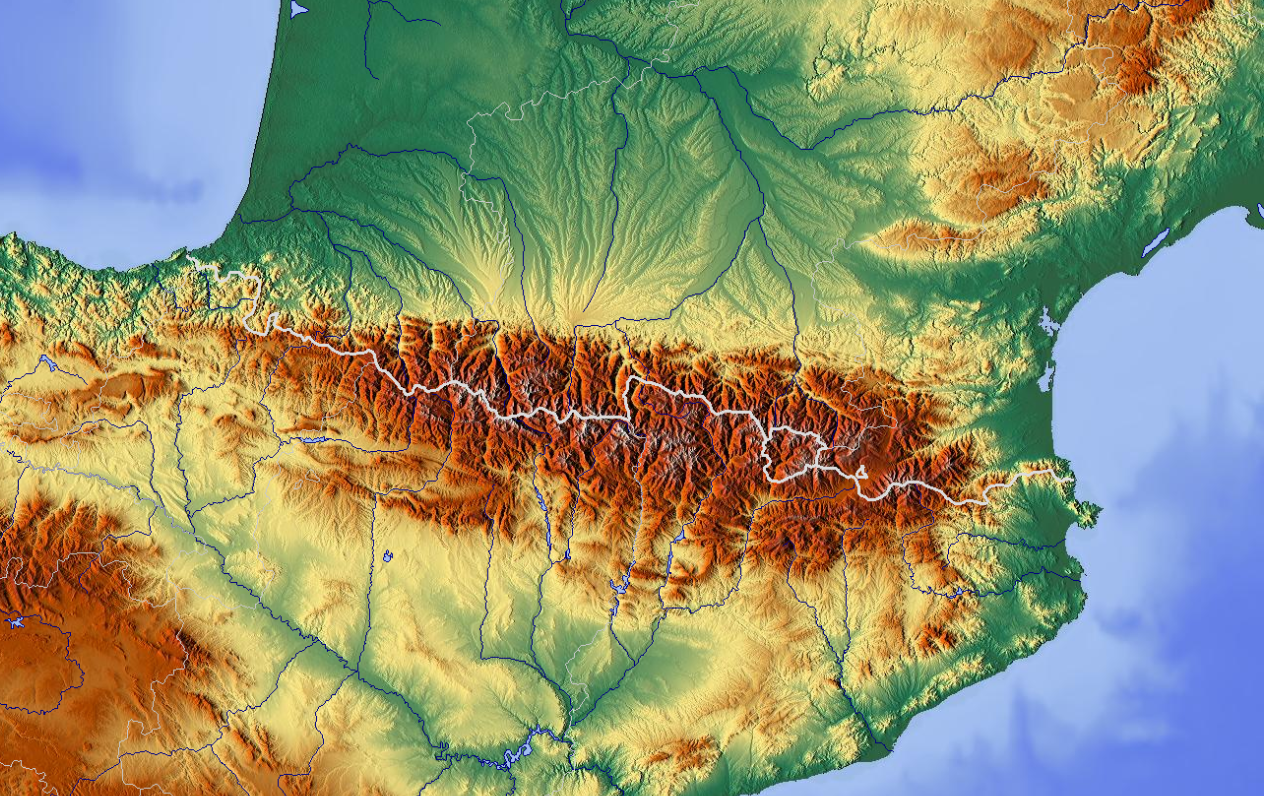
Topographic map of the Pyrenees, the Tremp-Graus Basin is located just south of the lake southeast of Andorra The Montsec is visible as an east–west running brown ridge

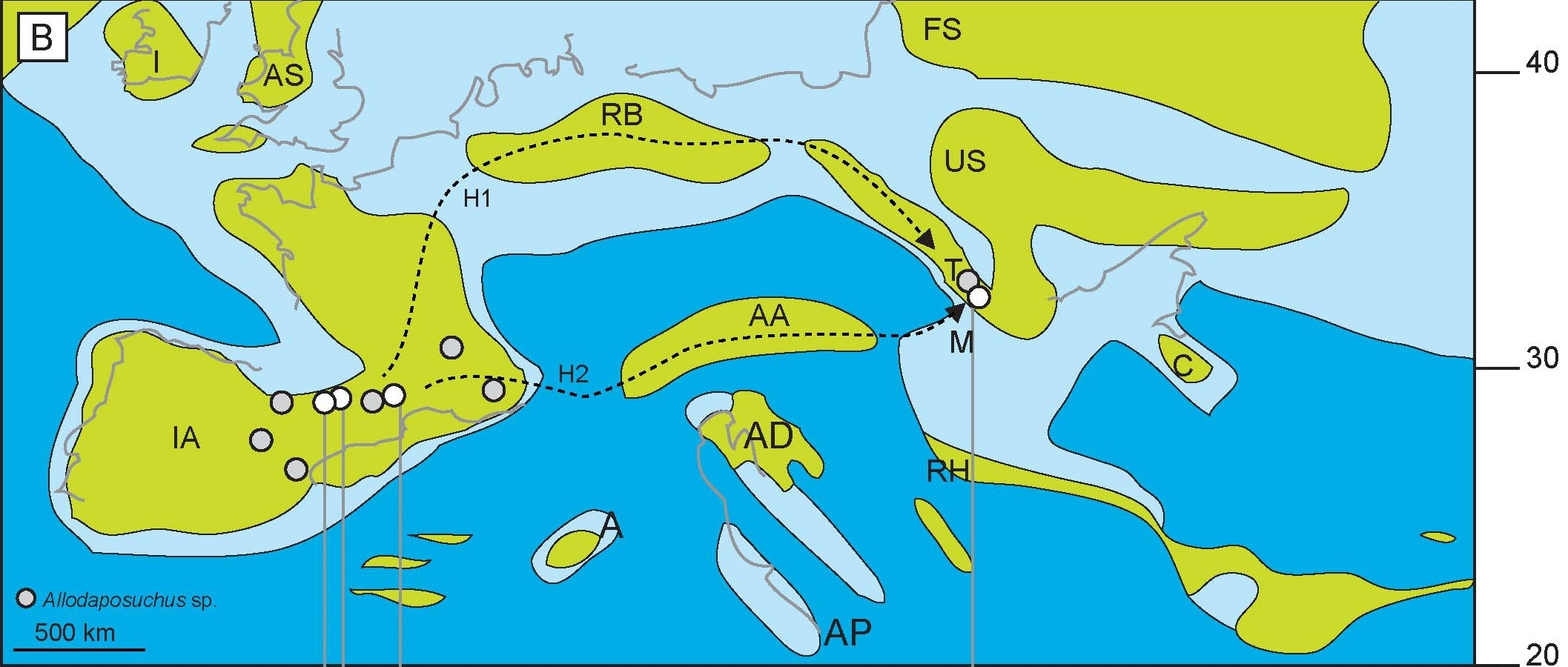
Paleogeography of Europe in the Maastrichtian

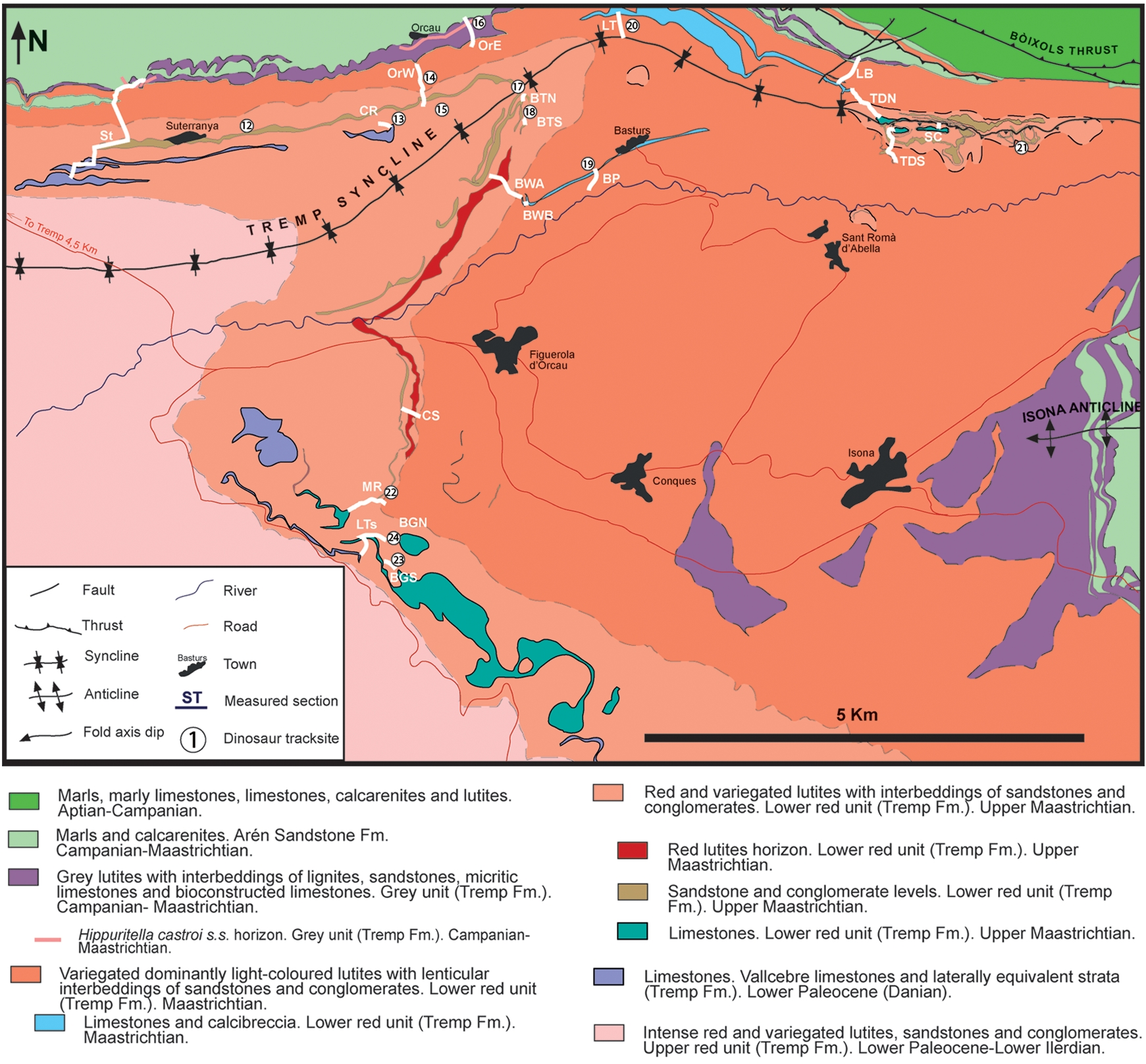
Overview of different units and fossil sites in the Tremp Formation

The Tremp Formation (Spanish: Formación de Tremp, Catalan: Formació de Tremp), alternatively described as Tremp Group (Spanish: Grupo Tremp), is a geological formation in the comarca Pallars Jussà, Lleida, Spain. The formation is restricted to the Tremp or Tremp-Graus Basin (Catalan: Conca de Tremp), a piggyback foreland basin in the Catalonian Pre-Pyrenees. The formation dates to the Maastrichtian to Thanetian, thus the formation includes the Cretaceous-Paleogene boundary that has been well studied in the area, using paleomagnetism and carbon and oxygen isotopes. The formation comprises several lithologies, from sandstone, conglomerates and shales to marls, siltstones, limestones and lignite and gypsum beds and ranges between 250 and 800 metres (820 and 2,620 ft) in thickness. The Tremp Formation was deposited in a continental to marginally marine fluvial-lacustrine environment characterized by estuarine to deltaic settings.

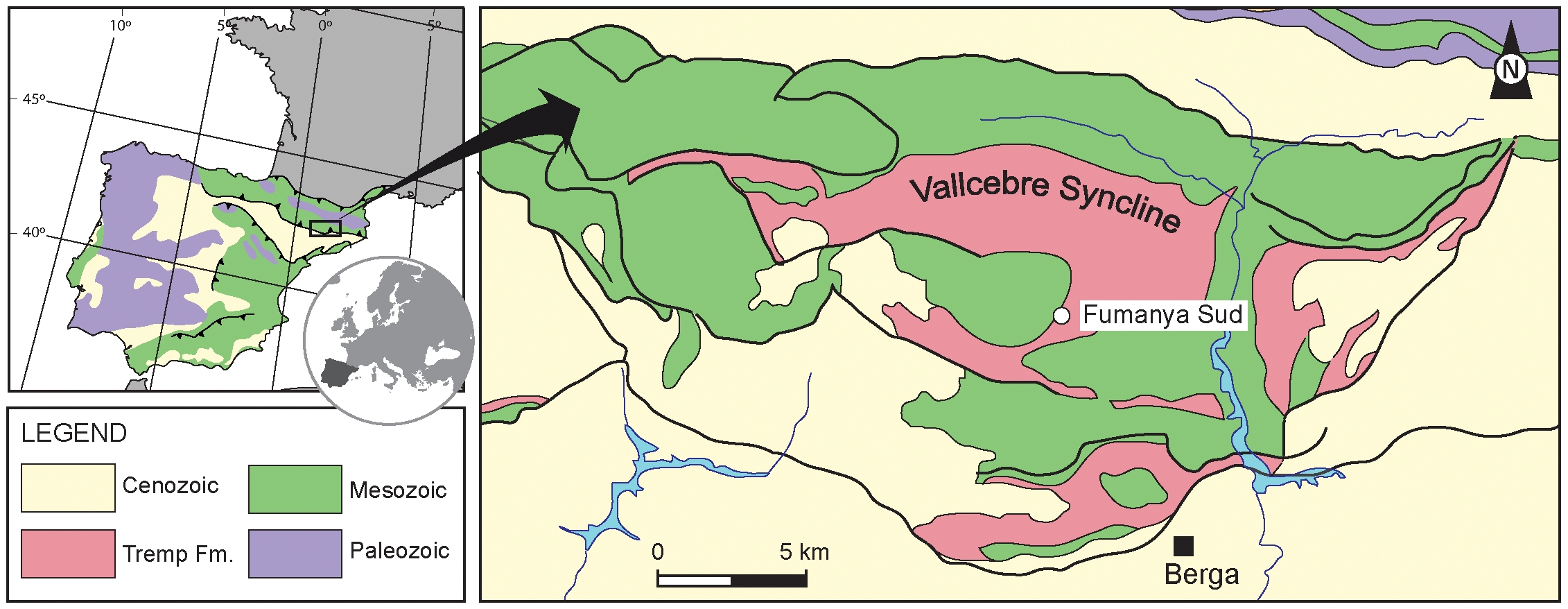
Outline of the Tremp Formation in the Tremp Basin

The Tremp Basin evolved into a sedimentary depression with the break-up of Pangea and the spreading of the North American and Eurasian plates in the Early Jurassic. Rifting between Africa and Europe in the Early Cretaceous created the isolated Iberian microplate, where the Tremp Basin was located in the northeastern corner in a back-arc basin tectonic regime. Between the middle Albian and early Cenomanian, a series of pull-apart basins developed, producing a local unconformity in the Tremp Basin. A first phase of tectonic compression commenced in the Cenomanian, lasting until the late Santonian, around 85 Ma, when Iberia started to rotate counterclockwise towards Europe, producing a series of piggyback basins in the southern Pre-Pyrenees. A more tectonically quiet posterior phase provided the Tremp Basin with a shallowing-upward sequence of marine carbonates until the moment of deposition of the Tremp Formation, in the lower section still marginally marine, but becoming more continental and lagoonal towards the top.

Shortly after deposition of the Tremp Formation, the Boixols Thrust, active to the north of the Tremp Basin and represented by the Sant Corneli anticline, started a phase of tectonic inversion, placing upper Santonian rocks on top of the northern Tremp Formation. The main phase of movement of another major thrust fault, the Montsec to the south of the Tremp Basin, happened not before the Early Eocene. Subsequently, the western Tremp Basin was covered by thick layers of conglomerates, creating a purely continental foreland basin, a trend observed going westward in the neighboring foreland basins of Ainsa and Jaca.

A rich and diverse assemblage of fossils has been reported from the formation, among which more than 1000 dinosaur bones, tracks dating up to just 300,000 years before the Cretaceous-Paleogene boundary, and many well-preserved eggs and nesting sites in situ, spread out over an area of 6,000 square metres (65,000 sq ft). Multiple specimens and newly described genera and species of crocodylians, mammals, turtles, lizards, amphibians and fish complete the rich vertebrate faunal assemblage of the Tremp Formation. Additionally, fresh-to-brackish water clams as Corbicula laletana, bivalves of Hippurites castroi, gastropods, plant remains and cyanobacteria as Girvanella were found in the Tremp Formation. The unique paleoenvironment, well-exposed geology, and importance as national heritage has sparked proposals to designate the Tremp Formation and its region as a protected geological site of interest since 2004, much like the Aliaga geological park and others in Spain.

Due to the exposure, the interaction of tectonics and sedimentation and access, the formation is among the best studied stratigraphic units in Europe, with many universities performing geological fieldwork and professional geologists studying the different lithologies of the Tremp Formation. The abundant paleontological finds are displayed in the local natural science museums of Tremp and Isona, where educational programs have been established explaining the geology and paleobiology of the area. In 2016, the Tremp Basin and surrounding areas were filed to become a Global Geopark, and on April 17, 2018, UNESCO accepted this proposal and designated the site Conca de Tremp-Montsec Global Geopark. Spain hosts the second-most Global Geoparks in the world, after China.

== Etymology ==
The Tremp Formation was defined and named in 1968 by Mey et al., just as the Tremp Basin after the Pre-Pyrenean town of Tremp. The various subdivisions of the formation or alternatively called group, are named after the villages, rivers, canyons and hills in the basin.

== Description ==
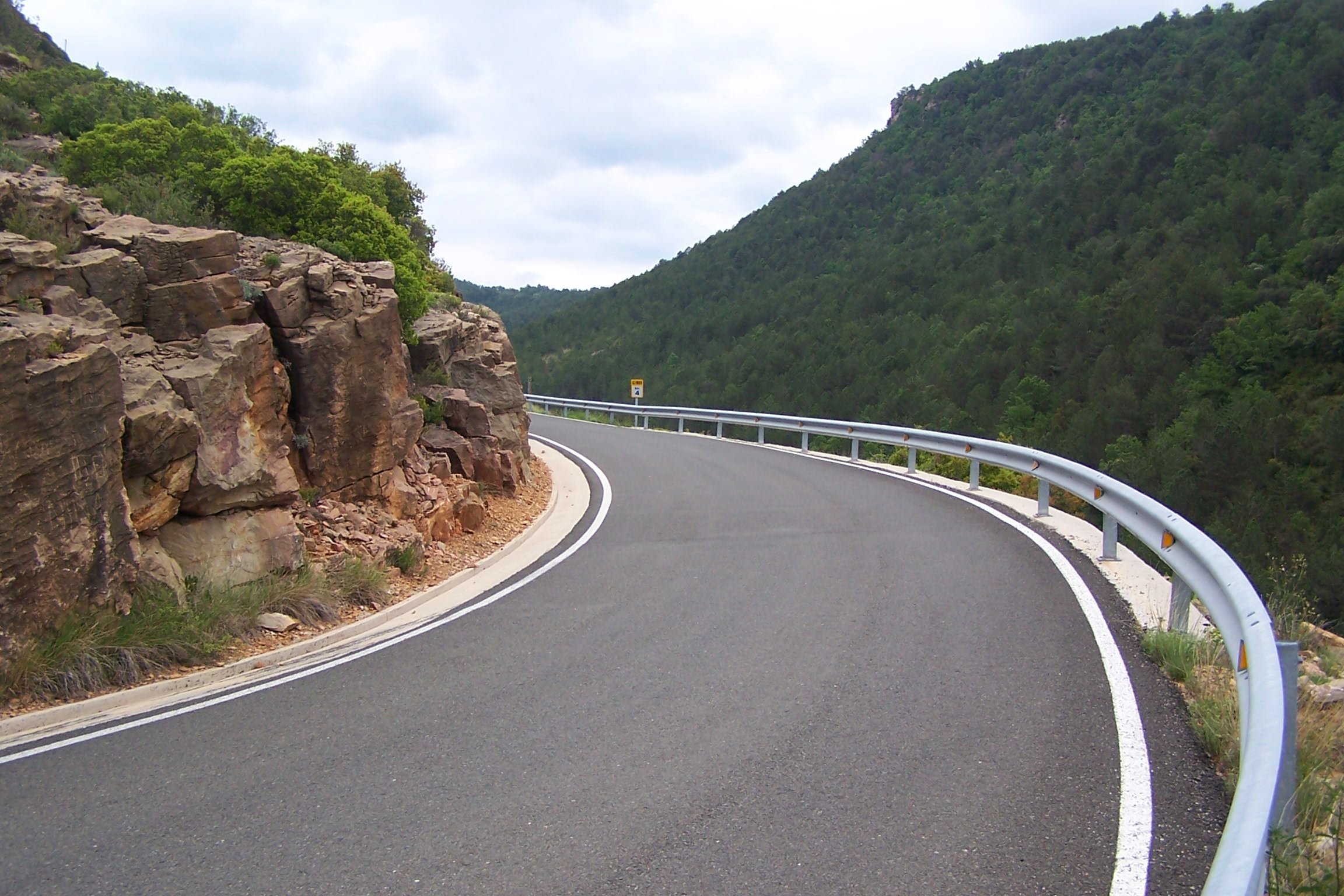
Red beds of the Tremp Formation along the road

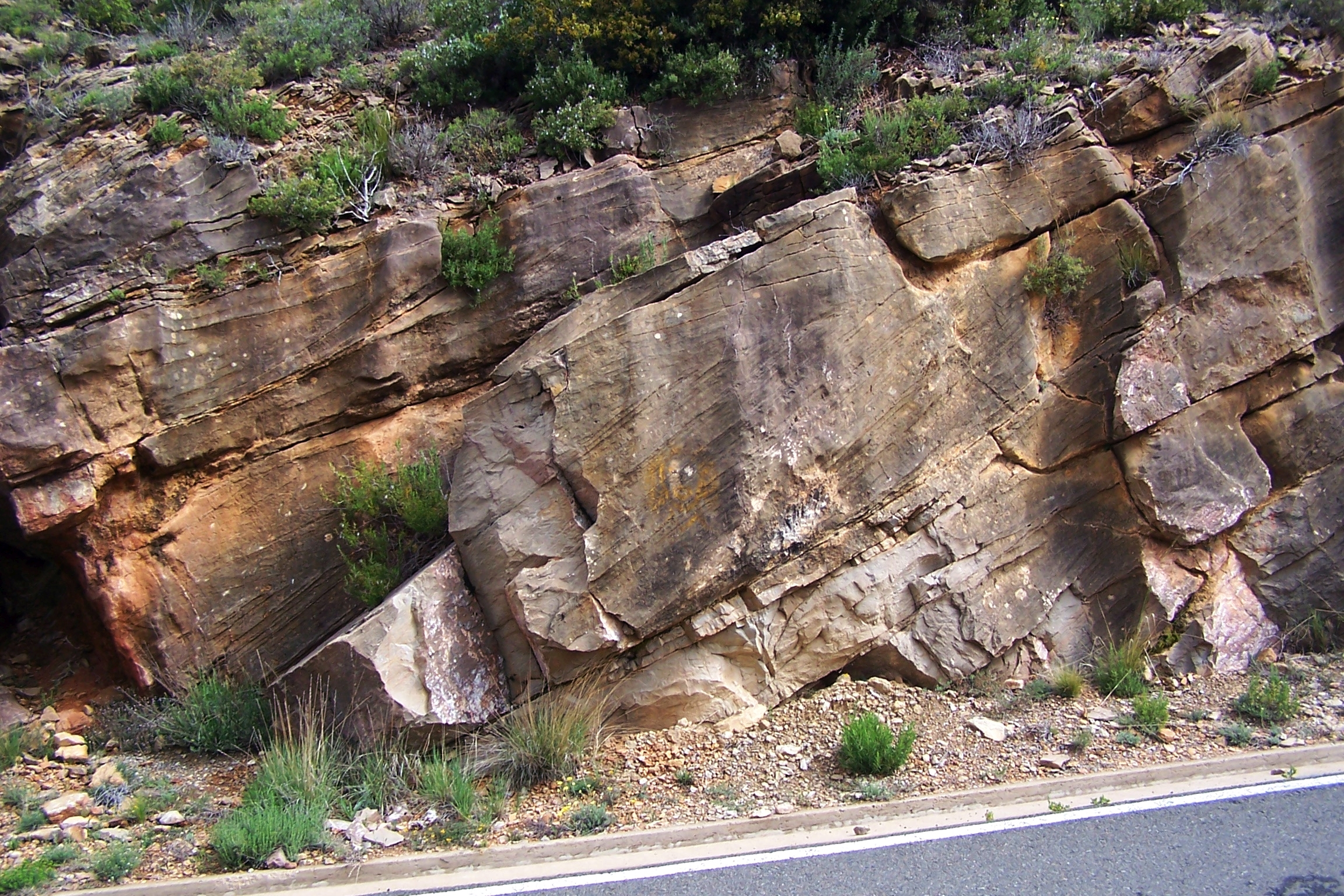
Cross-bedded sandstones of the Tremp Formation

The Tremp Formation is a marginally marine to fluvial to lacustrine and continental sedimentary unit with a thickness varying between 250 and 800 metres (820 and 2,620 ft). The formation is found in the Tremp-Graus Basin, a piggyback basin enclosed by the Sant Corneli anticline in the north, the Boixols Thrust in the northeast, the Montsec Thrust in the south and the Collegats Formation in the west. The Tremp-Graus Basin is bordering the Ainsa Basin to the west, and the Àger Basin to the south. The basin is subdivided into four synclinal areas, from east to west Vallcebre, Coll de Nargó, Tremp and Àger. While in Benabarre, the Tremp Formation overlies the Arén Formation, in Fontllonga the formation rests on top of the Les Serres Limestone. The formation is partly laterally equivalent with the Arén Formation. The Tremp Formation is stratigraphically overlain by the late Paleogene, locally called Ilerdiense, Àger Formation and the Alveolina Limestone, though in many parts of the Tremp Basin the formation is exposed and covered by alluvium.

The formation comprises several different lithologies, as sandstones, shales, limestones, marls, lignites, gypsum beds, conglomerates and siltstones have been registered.

The start age of the Tremp Formation has been established on the basis of the presence of Abathomphalus mayaroensis, a planktonic foraminiferan indicative of the latest Maastrichtian age of the formation. The lower section of the formation at the Elías site has been dated at 67.6 Ma, while the top of the Tremp Formation, in the western portion of the basin overlain by the Alveolina Limestone, named due to the abundance of Alveolina, is set at 56 Ma.

On the northern side of the axial zone of the Pyrenees, in the French sub-Pyrenean zone and Aquitaine Platform of the foreland basin bordering the mountain range, the time-equivalent stratigraphic units of the Tremp Formation are the Mas d'Azil Formation and Marnes d'Auzas Formation for the latest Maastrichtian, the Entonnoir Formation for the Danian and the Rieubach Group correlating with the Thanetian portion of the Tremp Formation.

=== Subdivisions ===
Studies performed in the 1990s described the Tremp Formation, also called Garumnian (Spanish: Garumniense de Tremp), as a group with a subdivision into:

==== Claret Formation ====
- Etymology - Claret
- Type section - along the road 1311
- Thickness - up to 350 metres (1,150 ft)
- Lithologies - ochre to red shales, gypsum beds and intercalated sandstones and conglomerates
- Depositional environment - transitional marine to continental

La Guixera Member

- Etymology - La Guixera
- Type section - Mongai
- Thickness - 60 to 350 metres (200 to 1,150 ft)
- Lithologies - gypsum beds alternating with shales, sandstones and conglomerates
- Depositional environment - evaporitic lacustrine deposits at times of retrogradation of alluvial fans

==== Esplugafreda Formation ====
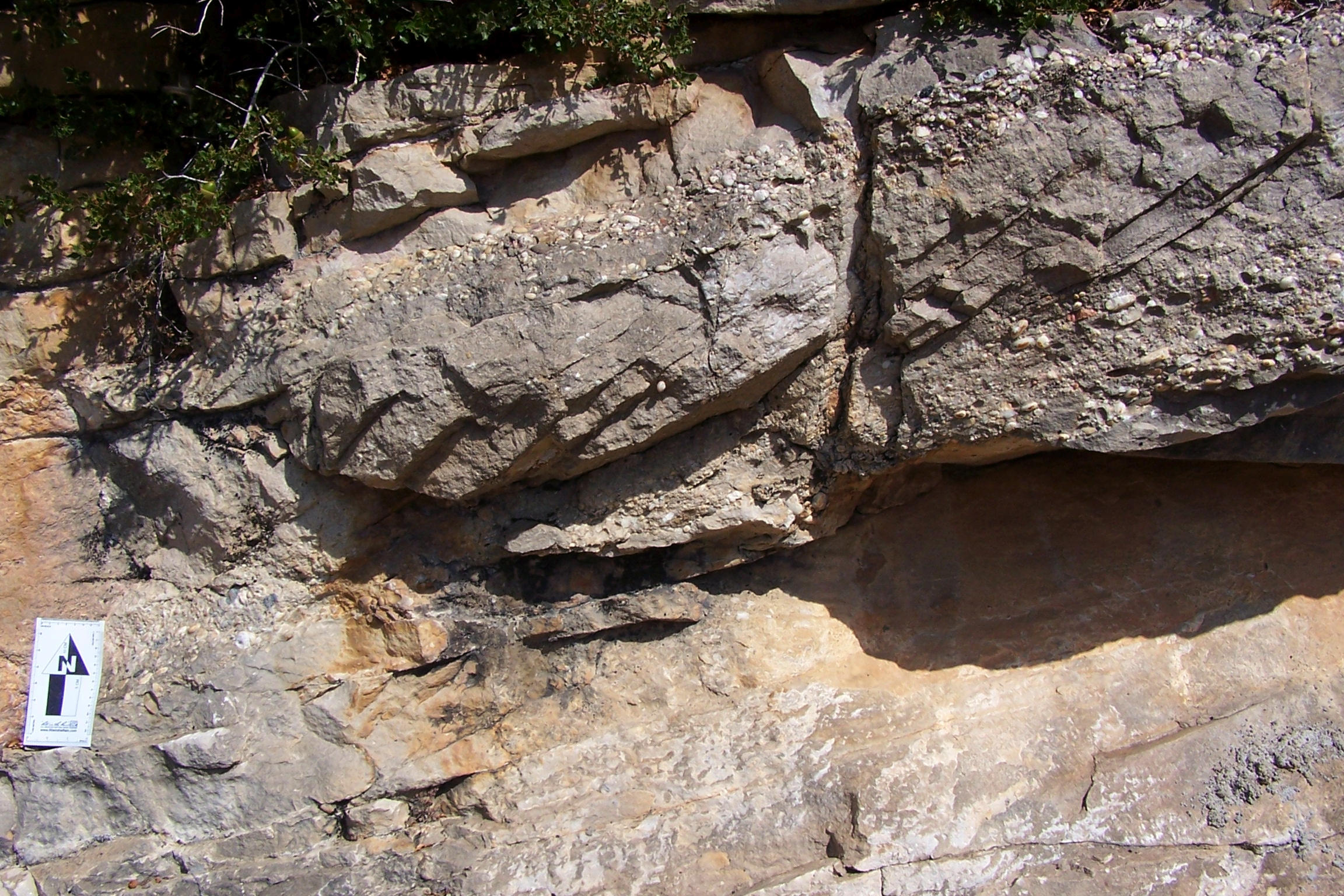
Cross-bedded conglomerates of the Tremp Formation

- Etymology - Esplugafreda canyon
- Type section - Barranco de Esplugafreda, in the valley of the Ribagorçana River east of Areny de Noguera
- Thickness - 70 to 350 metres (230 to 1,150 ft)
- Lithologies - continental red beds; shales, sandstones and conglomerates
- Depositional environment - alluvial fans

==== Sant Salvador de Toló Formation ====
- Etymology - Sant Salvador de Toló
- Type section - Conquès River
- Thickness - 70 to 350 metres (230 to 1,150 ft)
- Lithologies - micritic limestones and greenish shales
- Depositional environment - lacustrine to coastal

==== Talarn Formation ====
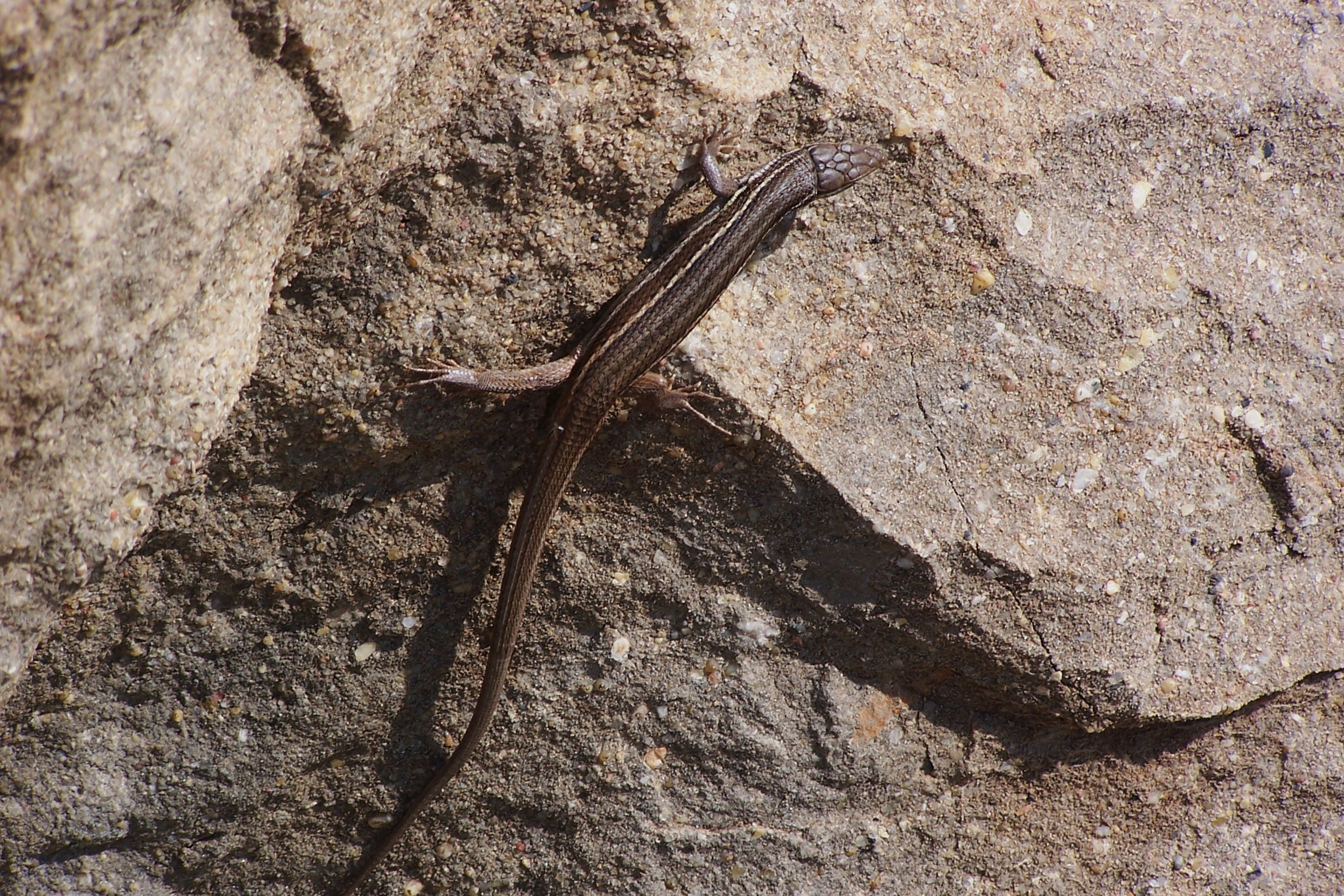
Conglomeratic section of the Tremp Formation, lizard providing the scale

- Etymology - Talarn
- Type section - Barranco de La Mata
- Thickness - 140 metres (460 ft)
- Lithologies - fining-upward sequence of sandstones and conglomerates at the base, grading into siltstones and shales near the top
- Depositional environment - alluvial channel and overbank deposits

==== Conquès Formation ====
- Etymology - Conquès River
- Type section - Barranco de Basturs
- Thickness - 60 to 500 metres (200 to 1,640 ft)
- Lithologies - greenish shales, sandstone lenses and conglomerates at the base
- Depositional environment - perilagoonal (Note: Other authors consider the Conquès Formation a lateral equivalent of the lower red unit of the Tremp Formation)

Tossal d'Obà Member

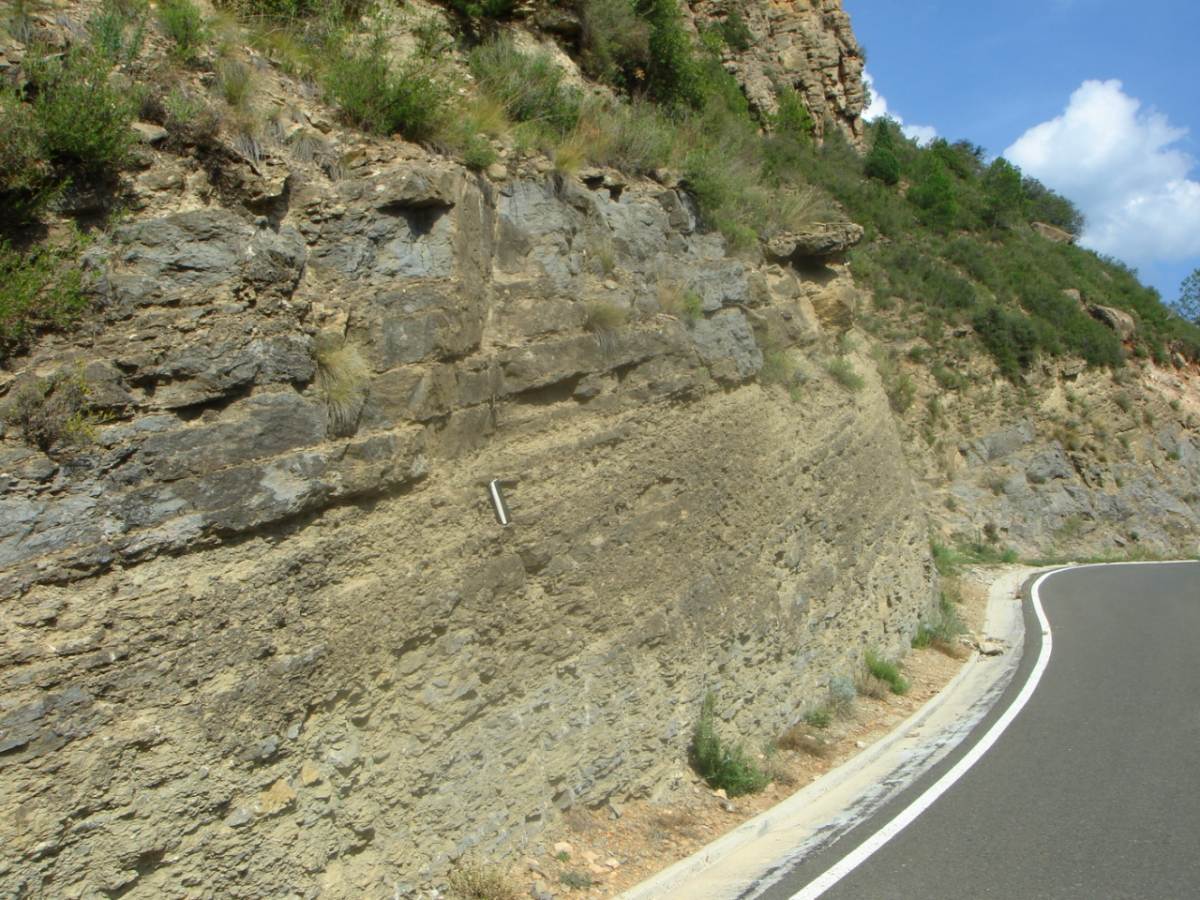
Marls with micritic limestones on top in the Tremp Formation

- Etymology - Tossal d'Obà
- Type section - Tossal d'Obà Hill
- Thickness - 7 metres (23 ft)
- Lithologies - micritic limestones and marls
- Depositional environment - distal fluvial to lagoonal-barrier island

Basturs Member

- Etymology - Basturs
- Type section - Barranco de Basturs
- Thickness - 2.5 to 80 metres (8.2 to 262.5 ft)
- Lithologies - micritic limestones, greenish shales and bioturbated fine sandstones
- Depositional environment - perilagoonal

==== Posa Formation ====
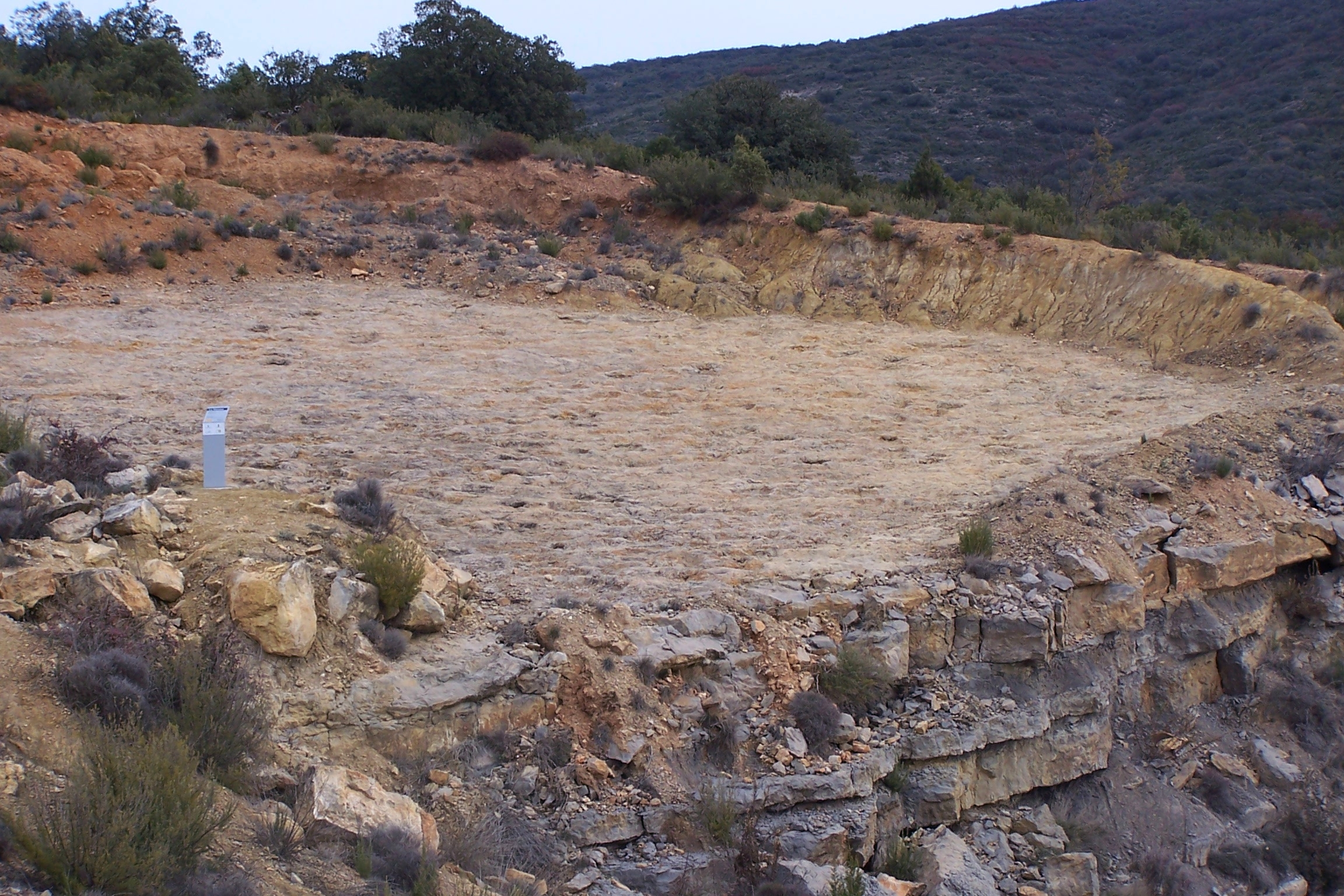
La Posa ichnofossil site of the Tremp Formation

- Etymology - Ermita La Posa
- Type section - Isona anticlinal
- Thickness - 180 metres (590 ft)
- Lithologies - grey shales, limestones, marls, lignite and sandstones
- Depositional environment - lagoonal to barrier island

==== Alternative subdivisions ====
An alternative subdivision uses Grey Garumnian at the base, overlain by Lower Red Garumnian and Vallcebre Limestone at the top. The Vallcebre limestone is laterally equivalent with another described unit, the Suterranya Limestone. Pujalte and Schmitz in 2005 defined another member, the Claret Conglomerate, as representative of a conglomeratic bed inside the Claret Formation.

In 2015, a new unit was allocated to the uppermost Cretaceous section of the Tremp Group, near the top of the Lower Red Garumnian. The 7 metres (23 ft) thick series of lithologically mature coarse-grained sandstones and microconglomerates rich in feldspars is positioned 7 to 10 metres (23 to 33 ft) below the Danian Vallcebre Limestone and was called the Reptile Sandstone.

== Tectonic evolution ==
Cross-section of the Pyrenees, the Tremp-Graus Basin is located at the left in the South Pyrenean Zone

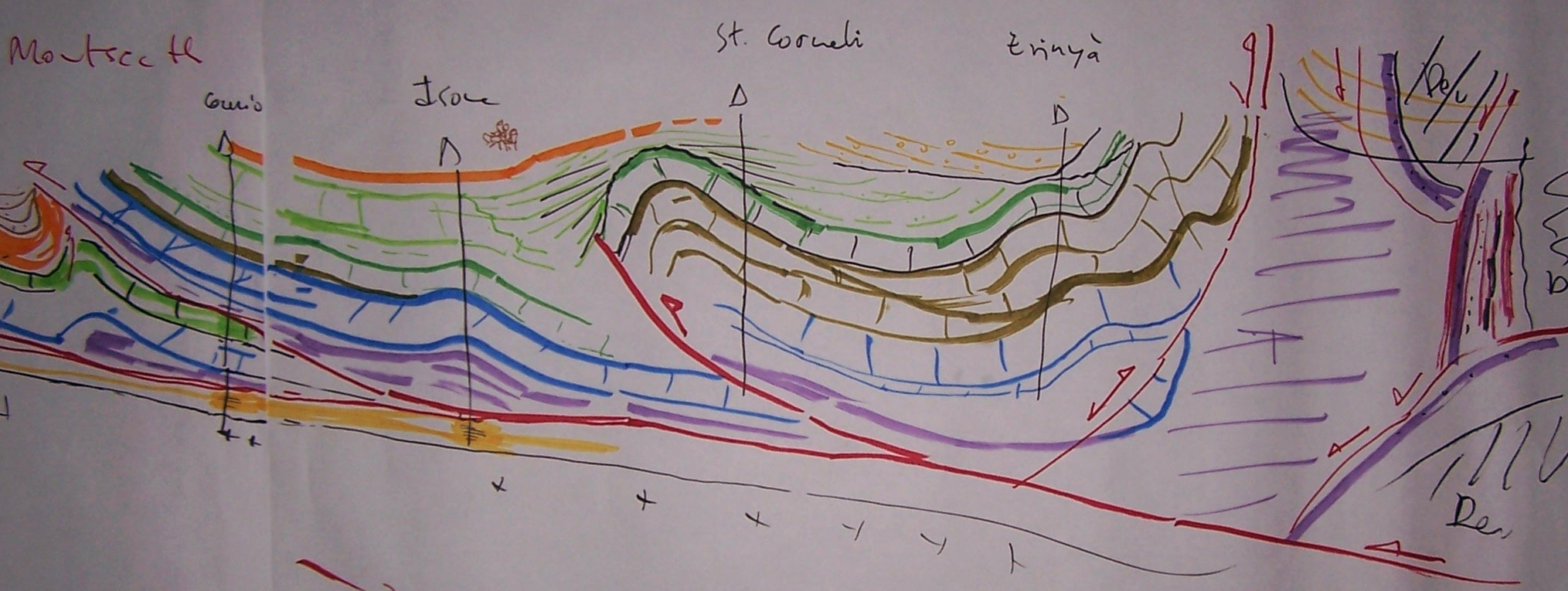
Regional cross-section from south (left) to north (right) showing the piggyback basin between the Montsec Thrust in the south and the Boixols Thrust in the north drawing by Josep Anton Muñoz

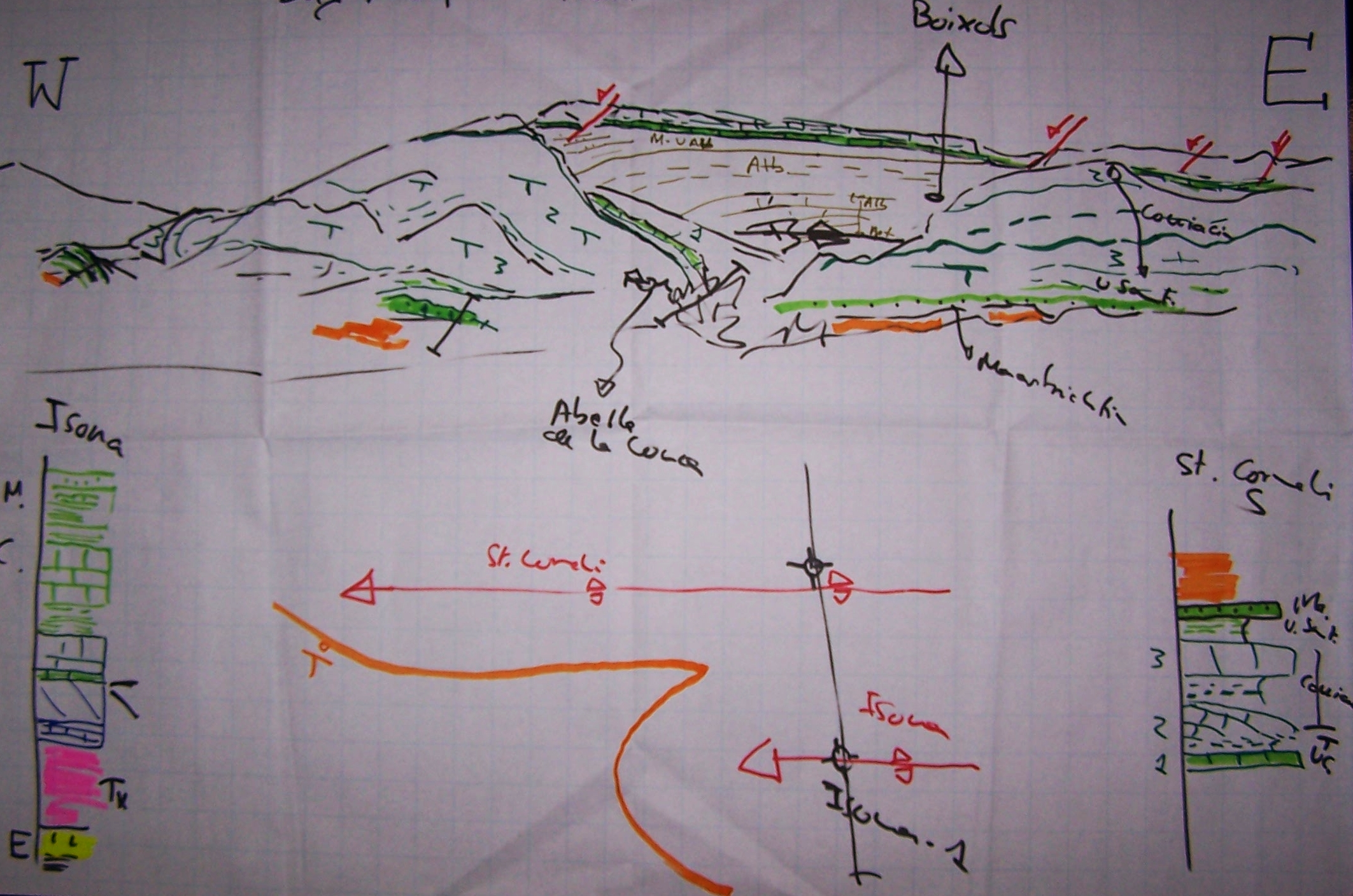
West-east view of the northern boundary of the Tremp-Graus Basin. The Boixols Thrust placed Upper Santonian limestones on top of the younger Maastrichtian Tremp Formation drawing by Josep Anton Muñoz

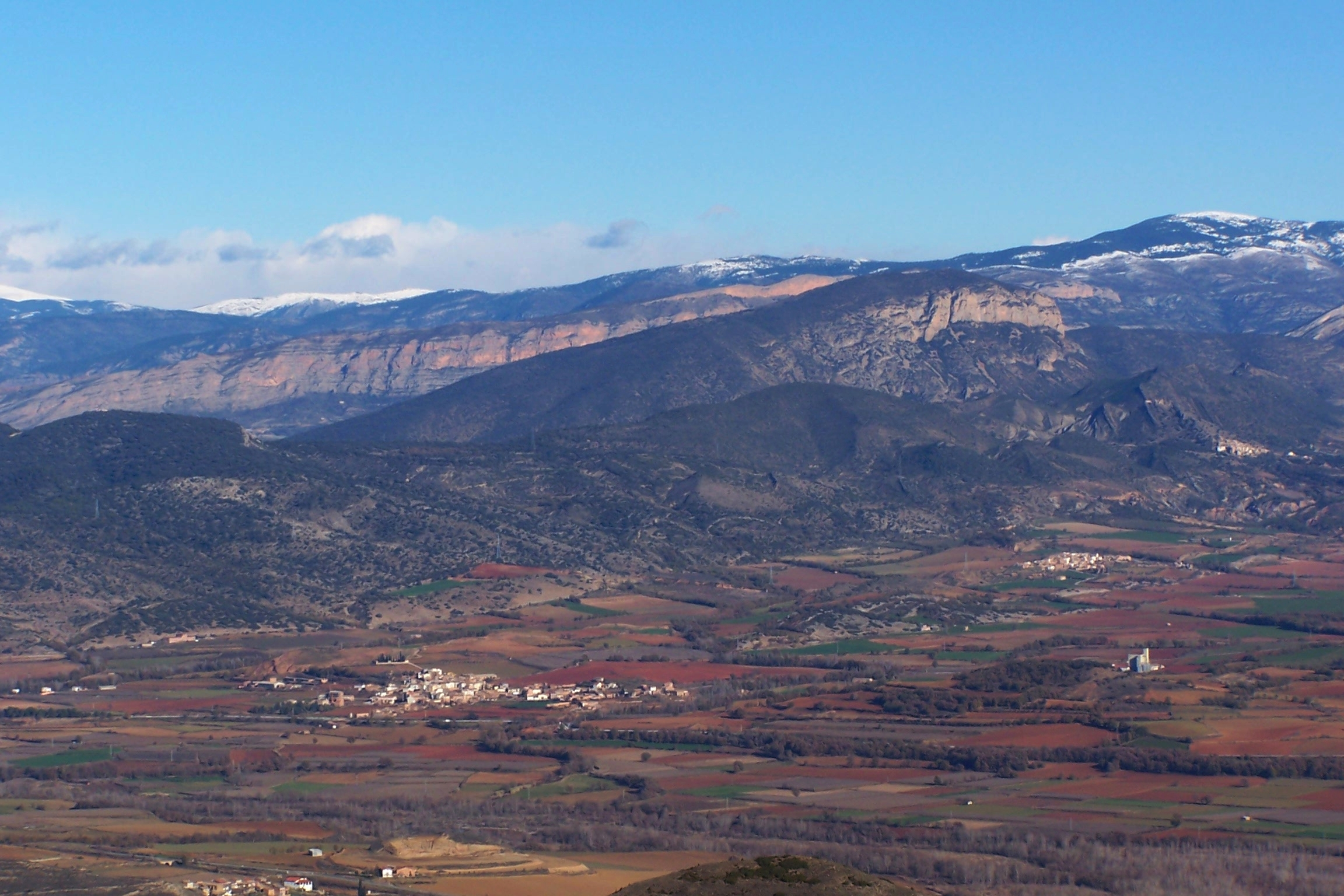
View from the south of the central part of the Tremp-Graus Basin with the Sant Corneli prominently in the background

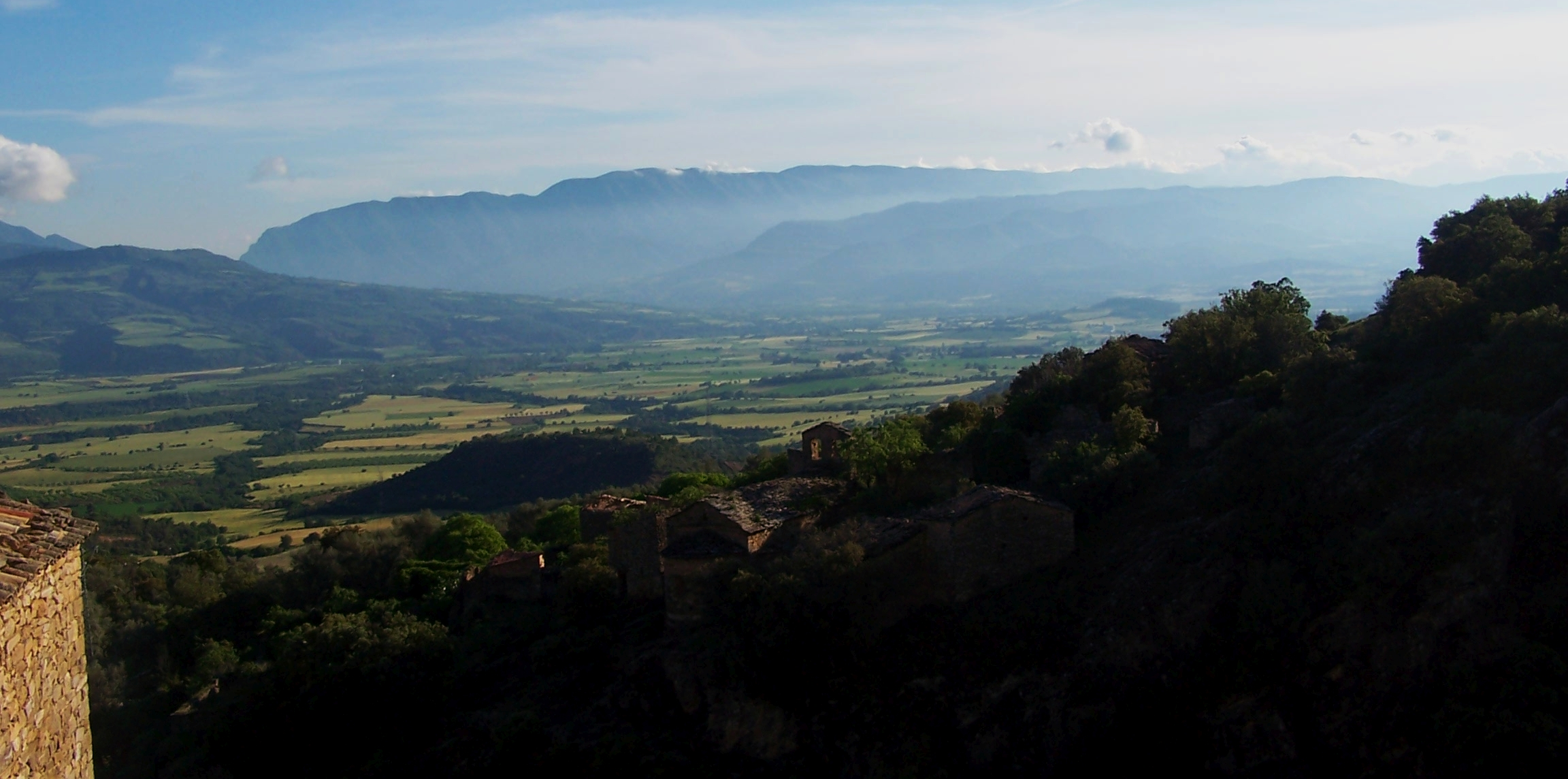
View from the north of the central part of the Tremp-Graus Basin with the Montsec in the background

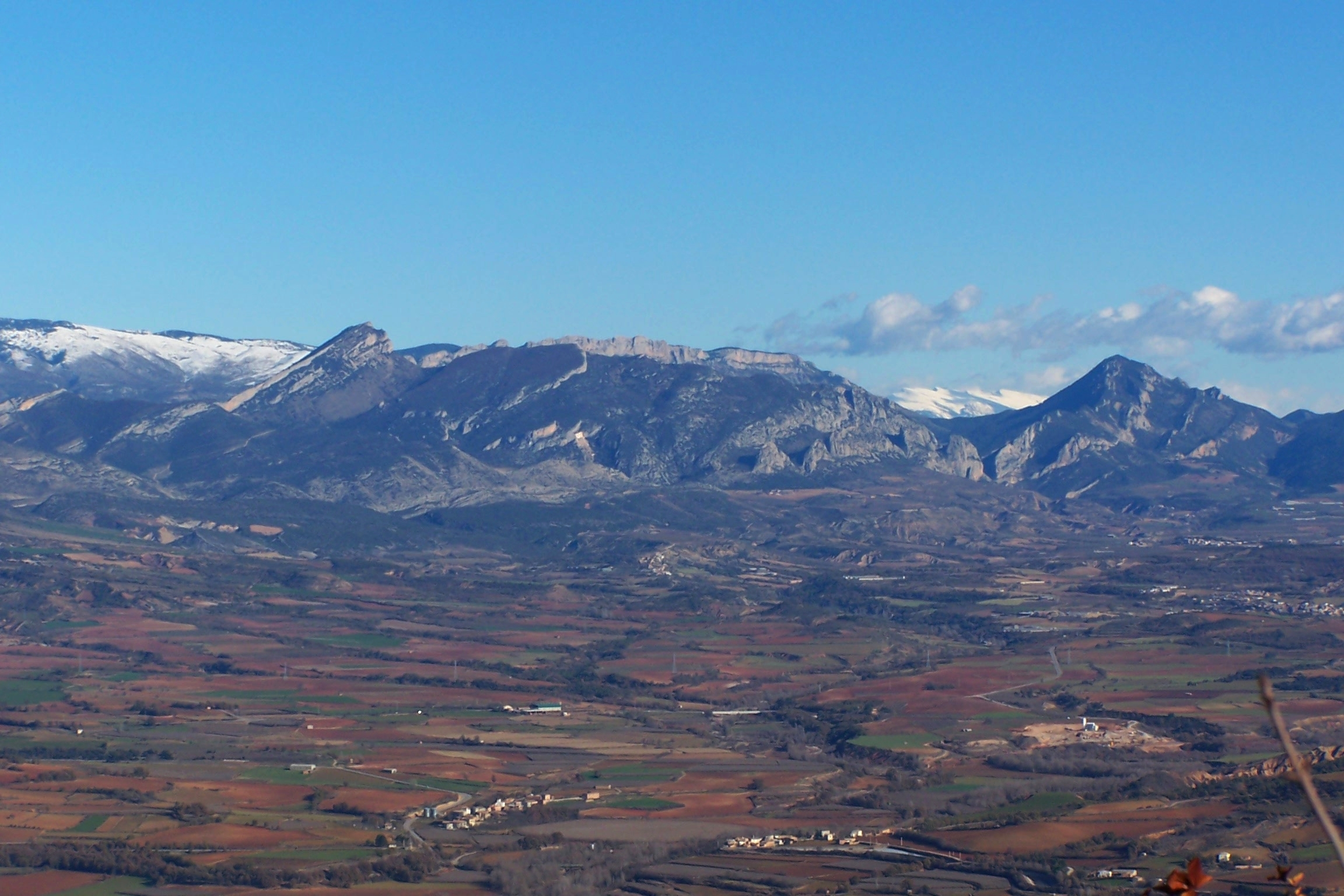
View from the west of the Tremp-Graus Basin with the Boixols Thrust and anticline in the background

The Tremp Basin was formed in the northeastern corner of the Iberian plate, a microplate that existed as a separate tectonic block between the Eurasian and African plates since the Hercynian orogeny that formed the supercontinent Pangea. Progressive opening of the Atlantic Ocean between the Americas and at first Africa, later Iberia and finally Europe, caused large differential motions between these continents, with extensional tectonics starting in the Early Jurassic with the opening of the Neotethys ocean between southwestern Europe and Africa. During this period, evaporites were deposited in the rift basins, later in the tectonic history becoming important décollement surfaces for the compressional movements. The phase of extension continued into the Early Cretaceous when the Iberian plate started to move counterclockwise to converge with the Eurasian plate.

=== Back-arc basin ===
Approximately from the late Berriasian to late Albian (120 to 100 Ma), the Iberian plate was an isolated island, separated from current southern France by a mostly shallow sea with a deeper pelagic channel in between the southwestern Eurasian and northeastern Iberian coasts. The present-day area of the Pyrenees with an area of 1,964 square kilometres (758 sq mi) in those times was much larger due to the various episodes of compressional tectonic forces and resulting shortening afterwards. The Tremp Basin, alternatively called Organyà Basin, was the depocenter of sedimentation during the late Early Cretaceous, showing an estimated vertical sedimentary thickness of 4,650 metres (15,260 ft) comprising mostly hemipelagic marls and limestones, deposited in a back-arc basin setting with normal faults parallel to the Pyrenean axis, and cross-cut by transverse faults, separating the various west-to-east minibasins. These minibasins showed a deepening trend from the Gulf of Biscay to the Mediterranean.

At the end of formation of the back-arc basin, around 95 Ma, high temperature metamorphism developed as a result of crustal thinning synchronously or immediately after the Albian to Cenomanian basin formation. Lower crustal granulitic rocks, as well as ultramafic upper mantle rocks (lherzolites) were emplaced along the prominent North Pyrenean Fault (NPF) crustal feature. The North Pyrenean Fault developed during the sinistral (left-lateral) displacement of the Iberian plate, which age is determined by the age of flysch pull-apart basins formed synchronously with the strike-slip movement along the NPF from Middle Albian to Early Cenomanian. This period is characterized by a local unconformity in the Tremp Basin, while this is not registered farther to the west of the Pre-Pyrenean minibasins near Pont de Suert.

=== Tectonic inversion ===
The previous phase was followed by a tectonically more quiet setting in the basins surrounding the slowly rising Pyrenees. Research published in 2014 has revealed a renewed phase of evaporitic deposition from the Coniacian to Santonian in the Cotiella Basin, west of the Tremp Basin. The relative tectonic quiescence lasted until the late Santonian, approximately around 85 Ma, with other authors defining this moment at 83 Ma. At this time, continental subduction and back-arc basin inversion commenced, with the remainder of the Neotethys Ocean progressively disappearing. During this phase, sea floor spreading in the Bay of Biscay occurred, leading to a rotation of plate movements, observed more prominently in the eastern part of the Iberian plate, where convergence rates of 70 kilometres (43 mi) per million years have been noted. As is common in inverted tectonic regimes, the normal faults of the early Mesozoic were reactivated into reverse faults at the end of the Cretaceous and continuing into the Paleogene. The lithospheric subduction has not been interpreted from seismic reflection data, with the ECORS profile obtained in the late 1980s as primary example, due to the large thickness and poor seismic resolution, but later analysis using tomography has identified this feature below the Pre-Pyrenean chain. The presence of lithospheric subduction is a common feature in other Alpine orogenic chains as the Alps and Himalayas.

=== Piggyback basin ===
From the late Santonian to the late Maastrichtian, on the different thrust sheets of the southward compressional Pre-Pyrenees, a series of piggyback basins were formed, one of which was the Tremp Basin. The bathymetry of these basins show a general deepening towards the west, with major turbidite deposition in the Ainsa Basin and farther west. Subsequent ongoing inversion of the basins show a similar trend, with compressional phases becoming younger from east to west. While the onlap and erosion in the Clamosa area started in the early Eocene, around 49 Ma, the western portion experienced this phase terminating around the end of the Eocene, approximately at 35 Ma. In the Jaca Basin, to the west of the Ainsa and Tremp Basins, during the Middle Eocene, flysch was deposited in an underfilled basin setting, while in the western Tremp Basin thick conglomerates, known as the Collegats Formation, were deposited, sourced by the various thrust sheets in the hinterland.

=== Boixols and Montsec thrusting ===
The Boixols–Cotiella thrust sheet was emplaced since the Late Cretaceous, placing late Santonian rocks on top of the northernmost Tremp Formation, found in the subsurface underneath the Sant Corneli anticline. This was followed by the tectonic movement of the Montsec–Peña Montañesa thrust sheet during the Early Eocene and the western Sierras Exteriores thrust sheet from the Mid-Eocene to Early Miocene. The dating of the Montsec Thrust has been established on the basis of the stratigraphies of the overlying hanging wall (Triassic to Cretaceous) onto the Lutetian (locally called Cuisian) fluvial sediments of the Àger Basin to the south of the Montsec. These tectonic movements are indicative of the main uplift phase of the Pyrenees.

=== Salt tectonics ===
The involvement of evaporites as décollement surfaces in compressional tectonic regimes is a widespread phenomenon on Earth. The evaporites, mainly salt but also gypsum, function as mobile ductile surfaces along which thrust faults can move. Global examples of halokinesis in compressional inverted tectonic regimes include the south Viking Graben, and Central Graben in the North Sea, offshore Tunisia, the Zagros Mountains of Iraq and Iran, northern Carpathians in Poland, western, and eastern Colombian, along the Eastern Frontal Fault System of the Eastern Ranges of the Andes, the Al Hajar Mountains of Oman, Dnieper-Donets Basin in Ukraine, the Sivas Basin in Turkey, the Kohat-Potwar fold and thrust belt of Pakistan, the Flinders Ranges in South Australia, during the Eurekan orogeny in the Sverdrup Basin of northeastern Canada and western Greenland, and many more.

In the western Cotiella Basin, salt inflation and withdrawal played a major role in the differential sedimentary thicknesses, facies changes and tectonic movements.

=== Eocene to recent ===
After the Middle Eocene, thick conglomerates were deposited in the western Tremp Basin and the thrust sheets reached their maximum displacement, this led to a shift of the depocenter from the Pre-Pyrenees towards the Ebro Basin. Paleomagnetic data show that the Iberian plate went through another phase of counterclockwise rotation, though not as fast as in the Santonian. Between 25 and 20 Ma, in the late Oligocene and early Miocene, a rotation of 7 degrees has been noted. This phase of rotation correlated with the thrusting in the westernmost areas of the southern Pre-Pyrenees, the Sierras Marginales, leading to continental conditions in that area from the early Miocene (Burdigalian) onwards.

== Depositional history ==
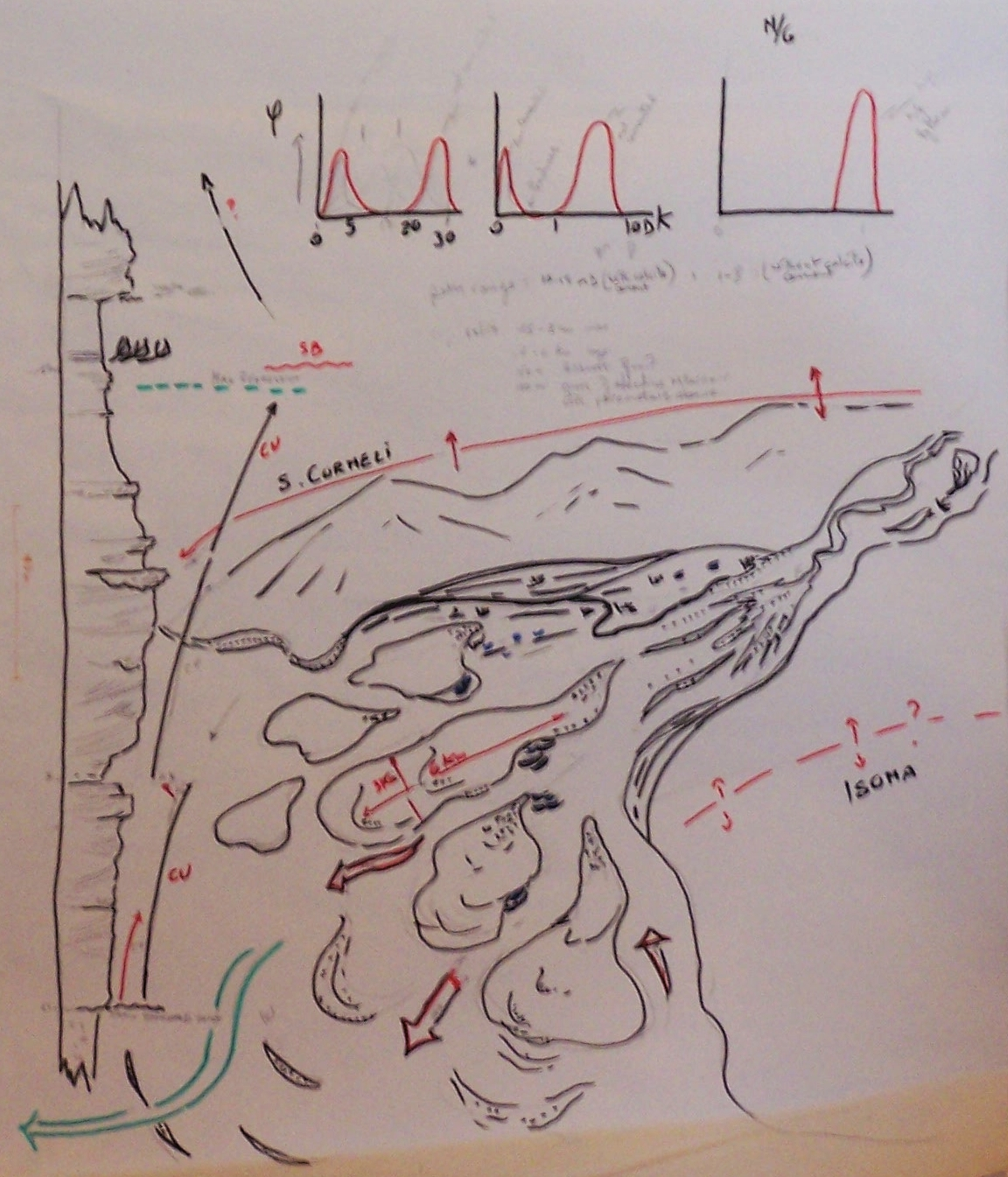
Depositional model of the Tremp Formation showing a lacustrine delta

The depositional environment of the Tremp Formation varies between continental, lacustrine, fluvial, and marginally marine (estuarine to deltaic and coastal). The continental deposits in the east of the basin have been interpreted as the distal part of alluvial fans, while the presence of cyanobacteria Girvanella in the lacustrine limestones indicates variability in salinity in the lacustrine areas and a possible lateral relation with transitional environments. The presence of great quantities of the fungus Microcodium indicates traces of rootlets. The biochemical data, based on C and O isotope analysis could indicate a rise in temperature, an increase in evaporation and a higher production of plant material at the transition of Maastrichtian and Paleocene. The top of the Tremp Formation is close to the Paleocene–Eocene Thermal Maximum, which could explain the relative lack of diversity in mammal genera.

Four phases in the depositional history of the Tremp Formation are noted:

1. Formation of an estuarine regime near the end of a Cretaceous regression in the Pyrenean basins, characterized by coastal plains where thick clays were deposited, cut by sporadic fluvial channels. At the margins of the basin, swampy conditions existed with sedimentation of carbonates. In these zones, the last dinosaurs inhabiting the area before the Cretaceous-Paleogene boundary left their marks in tracks, eggs and bones. These areas were accompanied by marshes, as evidenced by the many plant remains that produced the lignite deposits found in the lower part of the Tremp Formation. During this first phase in the sedimentary sequence of the formation, the Montsec was already a slightly elevated area in the south and along the submerged slopes of that hill, lacustrine limestones were deposited.
2. At the end of the Cretaceous, a geologically sudden drop of sea level happened, giving rise to a wide fluvial-dominated basin. In this environment, river channels deposited sandstones and abundant overbank clays with numerous paleosols in the basin. On the southern side of the rising Montsec, the Àger Basin, a similar fluvial system developed with a far more coarse-grained sandy character than in its northern counterpart around Tremp. The paleocurrents in the Àger Basin were towards the north and northwest. The enclosed continental basin turned into a more coastal environment at a transgressional phase with smaller channels where oncolites were laid down. The river systems on both sides of the Montsec were sourced by the easternmost parts of the present Pyrenees, with the Empordà High as provenance area. This east-to-west fluvial system, contrary to the present-day west–east flowing direction of the Ebro Basin, persisted until the Late Eocene. The uppermost unit of the Maastrichtian sequence, the coarse-grained Reptile Sandstone, has been interpreted as a fast-flowing braided river channel.
3. The start of the Paleocene was marked by a more tranquil deposition of lacustrine character. It has been hypothesized that the Alpine orogeny during this phase was less active and/or a regional rise in sea level allowed the basin to be flooded. During this phase, the limestones of Vallcebre and its lateral equivalents were deposited in the lake.
4. A renewed phase of tectonic activity reactivated the fluvial to alluvial sedimentation, with abundant conglomerates and conglomeratic sandstones as a result. The provenance area for these uppermost sections of the Tremp Formation were first interpreted as the presently high mountains of the axial zone of the Pyrenees, at that time a forming orogen. Detailed provenance analysis published in 2015 by Gómez et al. however shows that the Àger basin was fed from the south (Prades area) and the Cadí-Vallcebre area was fed from the southeast (Montseny area), both areas belonging to the Ebro Massif. The Pyrenean basement (axial zone) was not a source area during the sedimentation of the Tremp Formation. The latest phase of depositional evolution is noted in a wider area in the Pre-Pyrenees and to the south in the Ebro Basin, that began its formation during the Eocene, building up to its present shape in Oligocene and Miocene times.

== Cretaceous-Paleogene boundary ==
The Tremp Formation spans the latest stage of the Cretaceous (Maastrichtian) and the earliest stages of the Paleocene (Danian and Thanetian). This has made the formation one of a few European unique localities to study the K/T boundary. In the Tremp Basin, the boundary is registered at Coll de Nargó, Isona and Fontllonga and established on the basis of paleomagnetism and a strong decrease of ∂^{13}C and ∂^{18}O isotopes. The typical iridium layer, found in other sites where the Cretaceous-Paleogene boundary has been noted, as Gubbio in Italy and Caravaca in Spain, has not been registered in the Tremp Formation.

== Paleontology ==
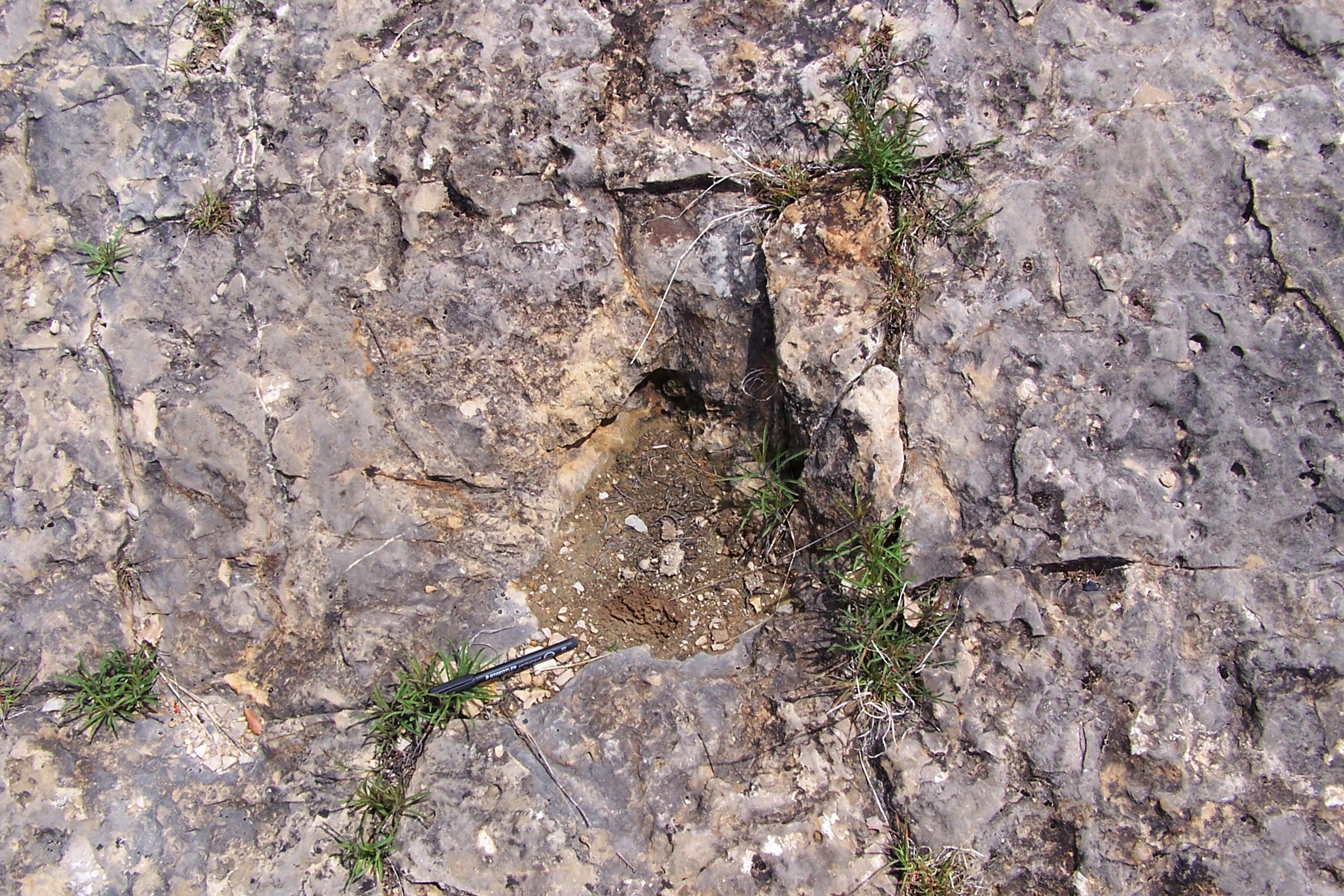
Ichnofossils at La Posa in the Tremp Formation. After initial interpretations as sauropod tracks, later models postulate they were produced by feeding rays.

The Tremp Formation provided many fossilized dinosaur eggs. The dinosaur eggs of Basturs are contained in the formation bordering the Arén Formation and the area where eggs are found stretches out for 6,000 square metres (65,000 sq ft). A great number of nests are visible as well as numerous fragments of egg shells. The presence of wave ripples indicates a beach-like environment where dinosaurs laid their eggs for a long time. The eggs are subcircular with diameters of approximately 20 centimetres (7.9 in) and egg shell thicknesses between 1.5 and 2 millimetres (0.059 and 0.079 in). Many eggs are found in groups of between four and seven gatherings, indicating the in situ preservation of the nests.

Also, remains of several genera of dinosaurs are described from the Tremp Formation. The Tremp and underlying Arén Formations are the richest sites for dinosaur fossils in the Pyrenees, with only at Basturs more than 1000 bone fragments found. The dinosaur paleofauna has been compared to Hațeg in Romania, famous for the pterosaur Hatzegopteryx named after the location. Furthermore, a rich variety of other reptiles, among which the new species and youngest fossil record of the Cretaceous turtle Polysternon; Polysternon isonae, as well as amphibians, lizards, fish, and mammals, for example the earliest Paleocene multituberculate Hainina pyrenaica, have been registered, showing a unique faunal assemblage for the Cretaceous-Paleogene boundary, not found elsewhere in Europe.

The holes found on the dip slope at Ermita La Posa were initially interpreted as tracks produced by sauropod dinosaurs. Later investigations and interpretations of the depositional environment of the Maastrichtian; the coastal origin of the trackbed with plenty of marine invertebrates, have led researchers to interpret part of the ichnofossils as feeding traces of rays in the intertidal zones. During their feeding activity, the rays produce holes in the top sedimentary layers, when they feed on marine invertebrates buried in the top sediment.

The Reptile Sandstone, when identified as a separate unit, was called as such because of the great abundance of fossil chelonid turtles, Bothremydidae, crocodile teeth, theropod limbs, and hadrosaur femurs.

This paper is the most comprehensive and up to date review of the fossils and stratigraphy of the formation.

=== Sauropod nesting sites ===
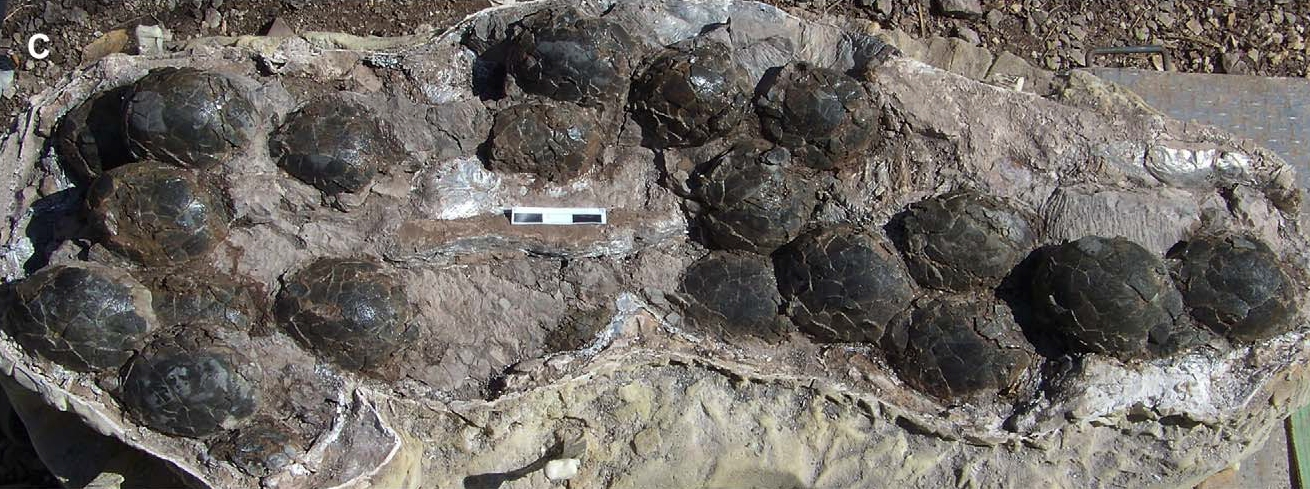
Underside of a clutch of eggs at Pinyes locality

A detailed analysis of the nesting sites of Coll de Nargó, at the Pinyes locality, has been performed in 2010 by Vilat et al. The eggs were found in the lower portion of the Lower Red Garumnian, with local facies comprising calcareous silty mudstones, very fine to fine-grained sand bodies, and medium to coarse-grained sandstones. The rocks, in a 36 metres (118 ft) thick interval, are interpreted as sedimentary deposits of a fluvial environment located some distance away from an active stream channel.

Most eggs exposed at the Pinyes locality were incompletely preserved because of recent erosion; however, excavation occasionally revealed relatively intact specimens in the subsurface. Some eggs exposed in cross-section revealed numerous eggshell fragments, predominantly oriented concave up within the mudstone matrix that filled the egg interior. Analysis of the eggshells at Pinyes provided a range of 2.23 to 2.91 millimetres (0.088 to 0.115 in) in shell thickness, with a mean range of 2.40 to 2.67 millimetres (0.094 to 0.105 in). Radial thin sections and SEM images of the eggshells showed a single structural layer of calcite. The eggshell surfaces displayed abundant elliptical pore openings that varied from 65 to 120 microns in width.

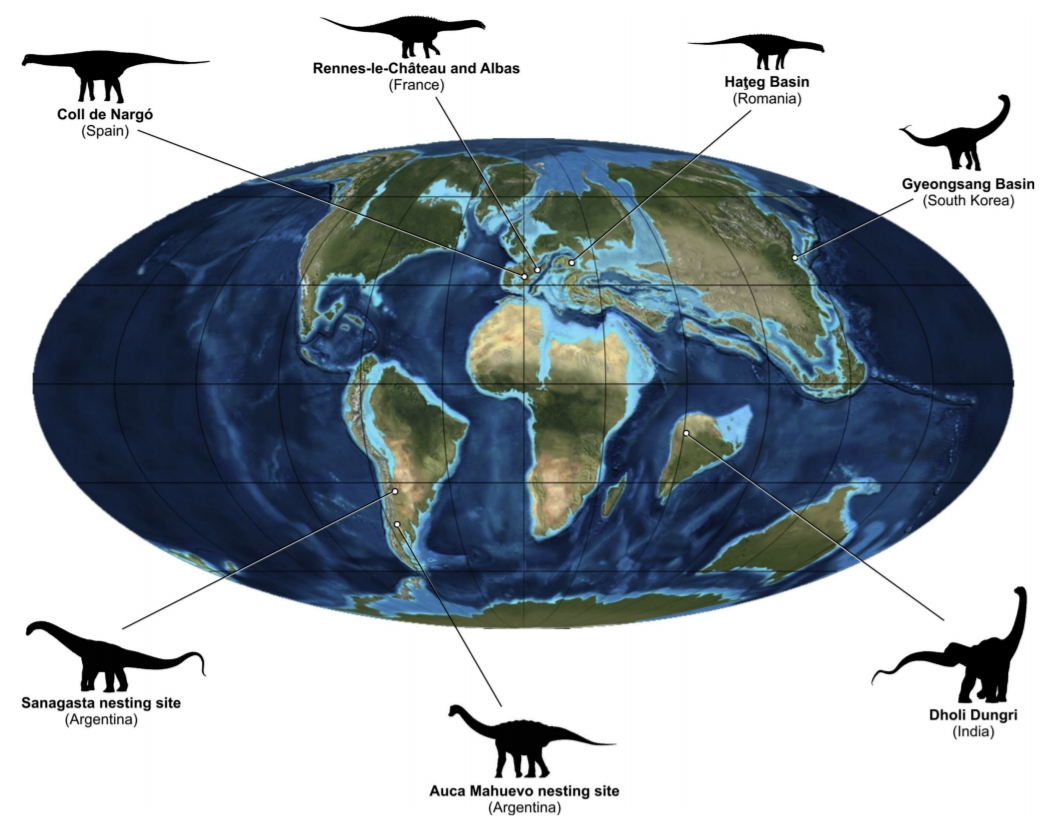
Paleogeography of the Maastrichtian and distribution of titanosaur nesting sites

The mudstones surrounding the eggs displayed extensive bioturbation, minor faults, and penetrative foliation with a northeast–southwest orientation. Eggshell fragments were often displaced and overlap one another, and the eggs exhibited significant deformation due to compression. Most eggs mapped in the field showed a long axis direction 044, thus having a general northeast–southwest orientation, which coincides with regional stress fields resulting from tectonic compression.

The eggs, in clusters or "clutches" of up to 28 individual eggs, were described as Megaloolithus siruguei, an oospecies well documented from various localities in northern Catalonia and southern France. The description was done on the basis of egg size, shape, eggshell microstructure, tuberculate ornamentation, and the presence of transversal canals in a tubocanaliculate pore system, an unequivocal feature of this oospecies. The egg horizons within the Tremp Formation were continuous before the tectonic inversion phase of the basin. The compressional tectonic regime produced structural deformation of the egg-bearing strata. The dip of the beds in the mountainous region can contribute to misinterpretation of reproductive behavior, hence the analysis of the eggs in combination with tectonic stresses gives a more complete picture of the shapes of the eggs.

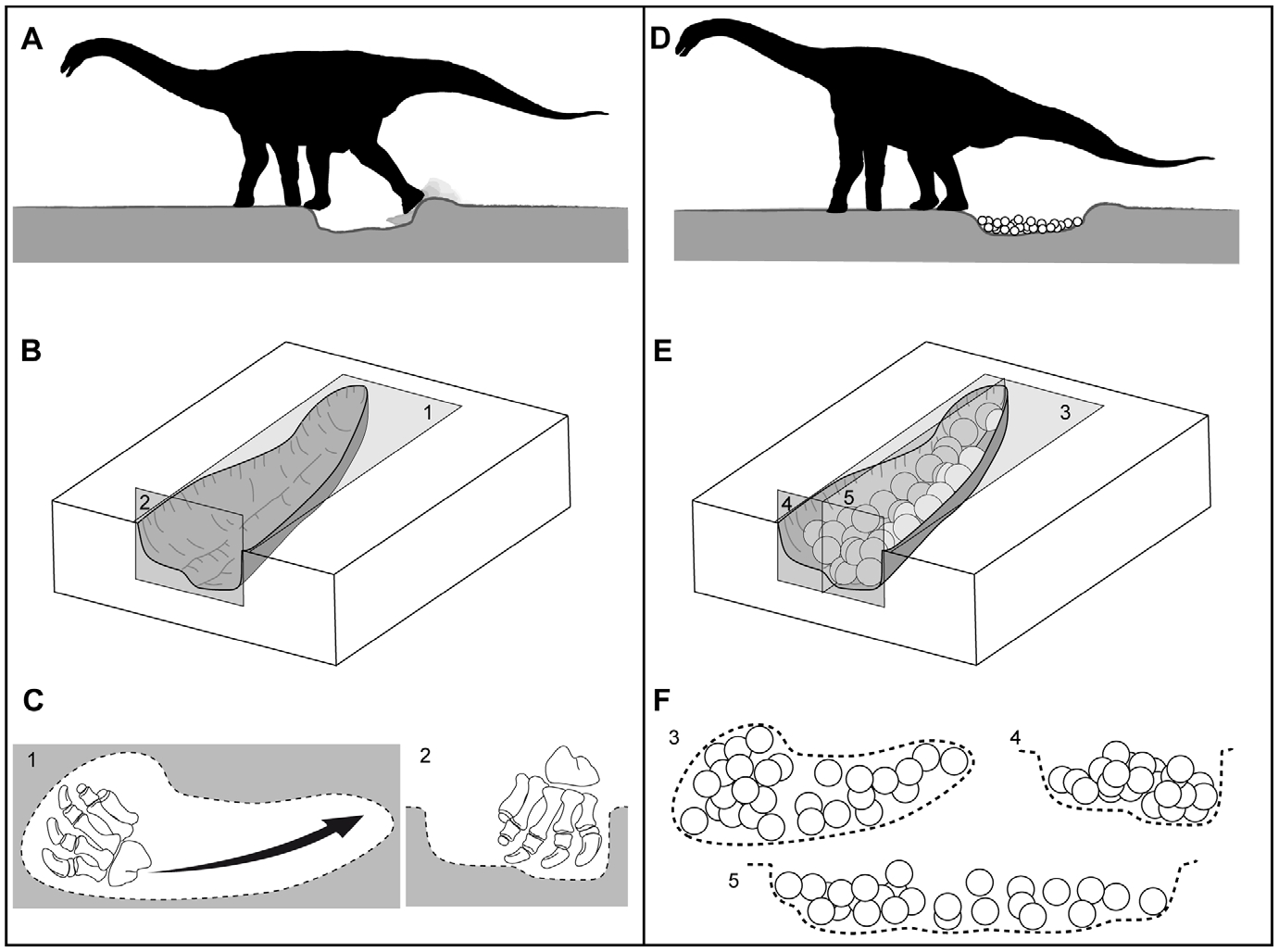
Interpretation of nest excavation and egg laying by a titanosaur

An interpretation of the nest excavation at Pinyes was made and compared to other nesting sites of sauropods found all over the world, in particular in the Aix Basin of southern France, the Allen and Anacleto Formations of Argentina, and the Lameta Formation of India. The nest sizes and shapes of Pinyes show great similarities with the other analyzed sites. Research conducted in 2015 by Hechenleitner et al. include a comparison with the Cretaceous Sanpetru Formation of Hațeg paleo-island in Romania, the Los Llanos Formation at Sanagasta geological park in Argentina, and the Boseong Formation of the Gyeongsang Basin in South Korea.

A common nest size of 25 eggs has been suggested for the Pinyes locality. Small egg clusters that display linear or grouped egg arrangements reported at Pinyes and other localities likely reflect recent erosion. The distinct clutch geometry reported at Pinyes and other megaloolithid localities worldwide, strongly suggests a common reproductive behavior that resulted from the use of the hind foot for scratch-digging during nest excavation. Due to their size and weight, the titanosaurs could not heat the eggs by direct body contact, so must have relied on external environmental heat for incubating their eggs. However, modern megapode birds as the maleo (Macrocephalon maleo), the Moluccan megapode (Eulipoa wallacei) and scrubfowls (Megapodius spp.) in Southeast Asia and Australia, burrow their eggs using the heat in the top soil to incubate them and provide protection from predators. The egg spatial distribution, in small clusters linearly to compactly grouped, but contained in round shaped areas of up to 2.3 metres (7.5 ft) would either support burrow- or mound-nesting at Pinyes.

=== Hadrosaur ichnofossils ===
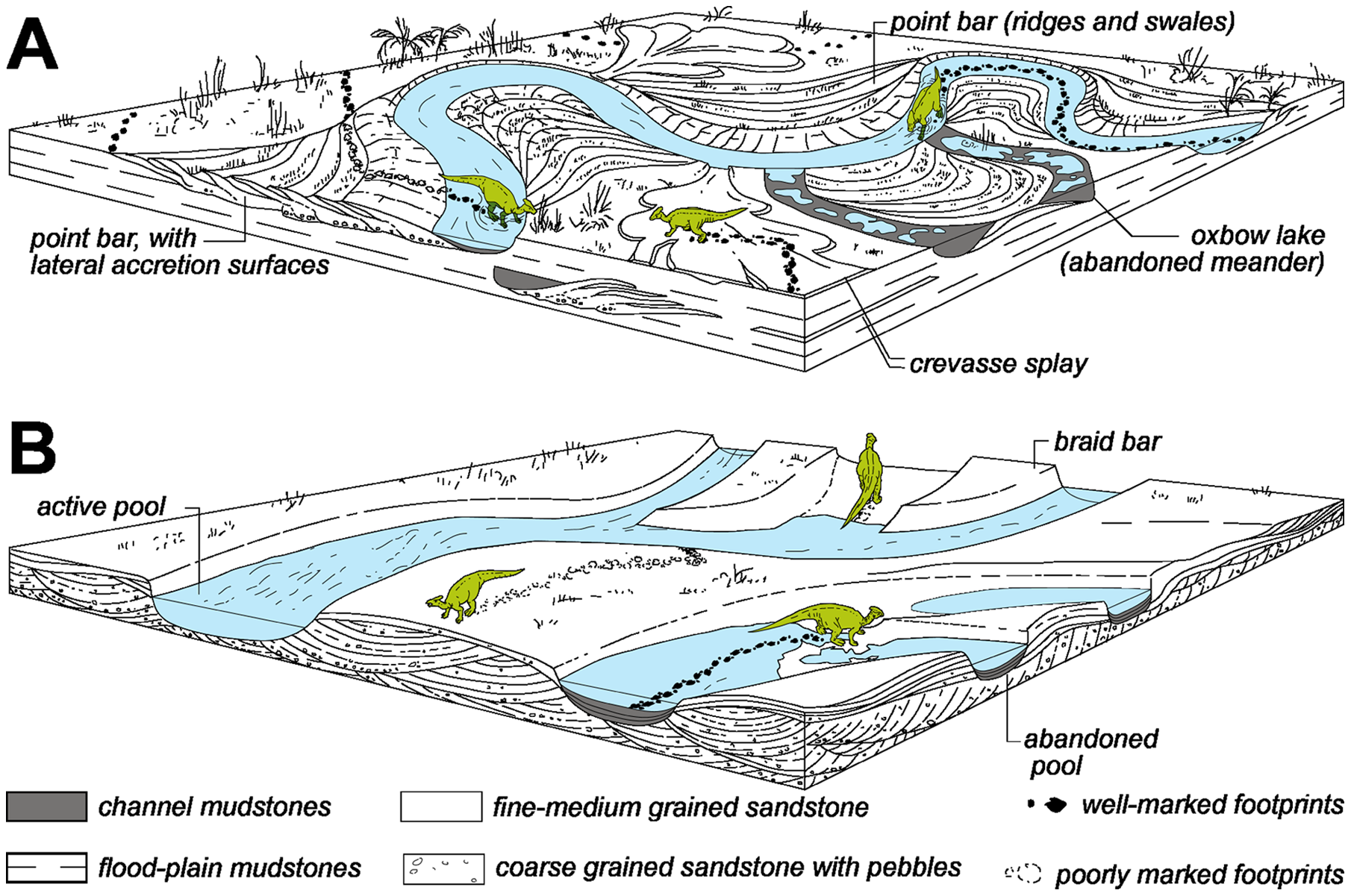
Hadrosaur tracks have been found in many areas of the Tremp Formation and were produced in various depositional environments

Over 45 fossil localities yielded hadrosaurid fossils in the Lower Red Garumnian of the eastern Tremp Syncline. Various new specimens of indeterminate Lambeosaurinae were described in 2013 by Prieto Márquez et al. Furthermore, many hadrosaur ichnofossils have been found in the Tremp Formation and were analyzed in great detail by Vila et al. in 2013. The most abundant track types in fluvial settings are the pedal prints of hadrosaurs, while titanosaur ichnofossils and a single theropod track were found in lagoonal environments. The authors concluded:

1. The fluvial lower red unit of the Tremp Formation exhibits meandering and braided fluvial systems with favorable conditions for track production and preservation, like those of North America and Asia.
2. The dinosaurs mainly produced the tracks on the floodplain, within the channels, and on and within crevasse splay deposits in low water stage conditions, and the footprints were infilled by sands during high water stage (stream reactivation).
3. The track record is composed of abundant hadrosaur and scarce sauropod and theropod tracks. The hadrosaur tracks are significantly smaller in size but morphologically similar to comparable records in North America and Asia. They are attributable to the ichnogenus Hadrosauropodus.
4. A rich track succession composed of more than 40 distinct track levels indicates that hadrosaur footprints are found above the early Maastrichtian–late Maastrichtian boundary and most noticeably in the late Maastrichtian, with tracks occurring abundantly in the Mesozoic part of the C29r magnetochron, during the last 300,000 years of the Cretaceous.
5. The occurrence of hadrosaur tracks in the Ibero-Armorican island seems to be characteristic of the late Maastrichtian time interval and thus they are important biochronostratigraphic markers in the faunal successions of the Late Cretaceous in southwestern Europe.

== Paleofauna ==
Color key: Taxon / Reclassified taxon / Taxon falsely reported as present / Dubious taxon or junior synonym / Ichnotaxon / Ootaxon / Morphotaxon

Notes
Uncertain or tentative taxa are in small text
~~crossed out~~ taxa are discredited.

=== Invertebrates ===
==== Bivalves ====
Bivalves of the Tremp Formation
Genus	Species	Locality	Stratigraphic unit	Material	Description	Images	Notes
Apricardia	A. sicoris	La Posa	Lower				
Corbicula	C. laletana	La Posa	Lower				
Hippurites	H. castroi	La Posa	Lower	A fossilized shell	A rudist bivalve		
Hippuritella	H. castroi	La Posa	Lower				
Hippuritella	H. lapeirousei	La Posa	Lower				
Radiolitella	R. pulchellus	La Posa	Lower				
Ostrea	O. garumnica	La Posa	Lower				
Praeradiolites	P. boucheroni	La Posa	Lower		A rudist bivalve		

==== Gastropods ====
Gastropods of the Tremp Formation
Genus	Species	Locality	Stratigraphic unit	Material	Description	Images	Notes
Cerithium	C. sp.	Grey Garumnian					
Cyclophorus	C. sp.	La Posa					
Lychnus	L. sp.	La Posa					
Melanoides	M. sp.	La Posa					
Neritina	N. sp.	La Posa					
Pyrgulifera	P. cf. stillens	La Posa					
Pyrgulifera	P. sp.	Grey Garumnian					

==== Ostracods ====
Ostracods of the Tremp Formation
Genus	Species	Locality	Stratigraphic unit	Material	Description	Images	Notes
Ilyocypris	I. colloti	Grey Garumnian					

=== Verterbrates ===
==== Amphibians ====
Amphibians of the Tremp Formation
Genus	Species	Locality	Stratigraphic unit	Material	Description	Images	Notes
Palaeobatrachidae	indet.	Blasi 2					
Paradiscoglossus	aff. P. sp.	Blasi 2					
Synorerpeton	S. ribagorzana	Blasi 2B		Many isolated cranial and postcranial bones	An albanerpetontid		

==== Crocodilians ====
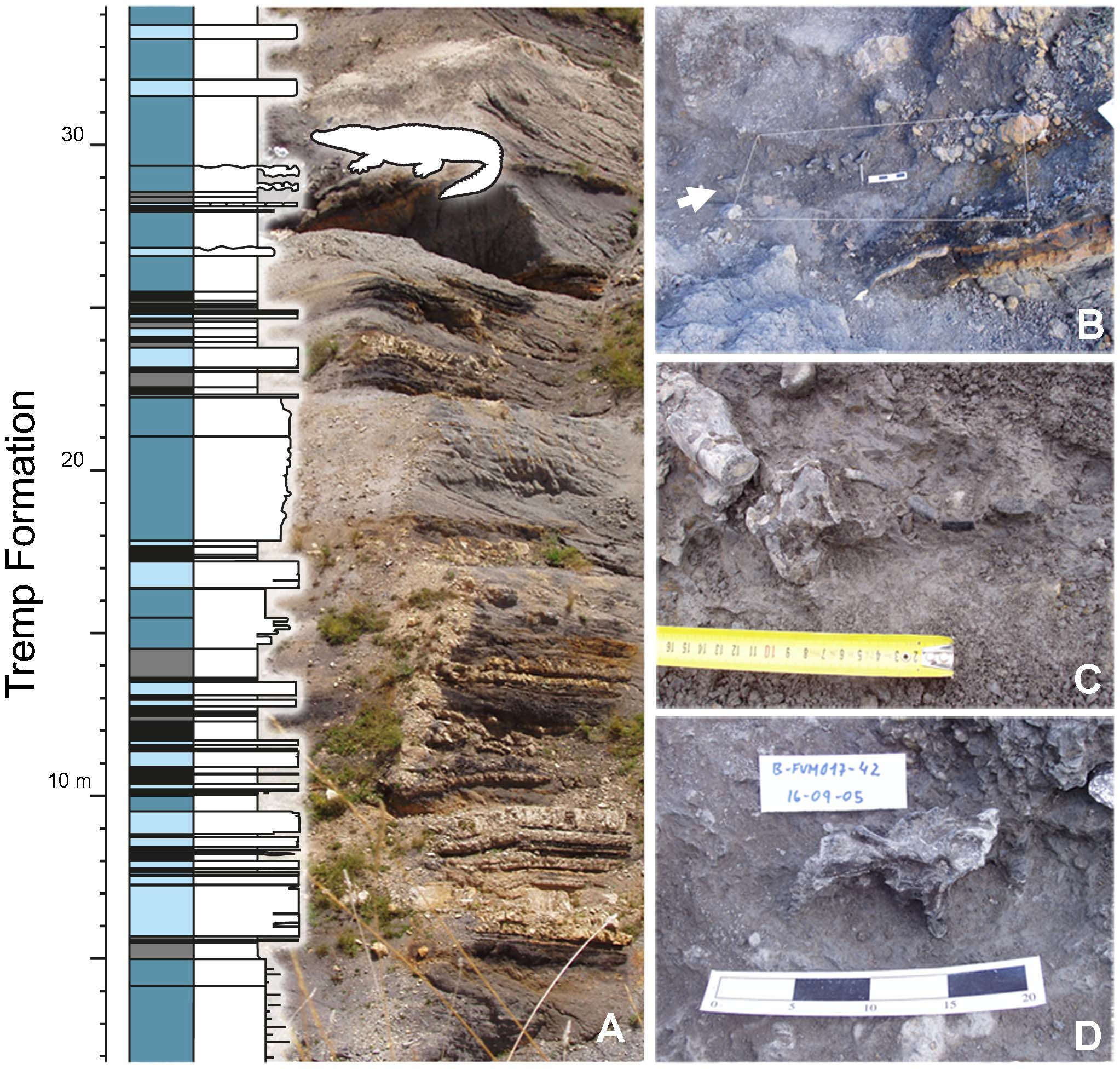
Crocodylian finds in the Tremp Formation at Fumanya Sud

Crocodilians of the Tremp Formation
Genus	Species	Locality	Stratigraphic unit	Material	Description	Images	Notes
Allodaposuchus	A. hulki	Casa Fabà, Conquès			An allodaposuchid crocodyliformes		
Allodaposuchus	A. palustris	Grey Garumnian			An allodaposuchid crocodyliformes		
Allodaposuchus	A. precedens	La Posa			An allodaposuchid crocodyliformes		
Agaresuchus	A. subjuniperus	Lo Hueco, Conquès		A skull	An allodaposuchid crocodylomorph		
Arenysuchus	A. gascabadiolorum	Conquès		A partial skull and four teeth	An allodaposuchid		
Acynodon	A. sp.	Conquès					
Crocodylia	indet.	La Posa and Reptile Sst.					
Ogresuchus	O. furatus	Coll de Nargó		A partial skull, partial skeleton, and teeth	Has been suggested to either be a Sebecid or a Atoposaurid crocodyliform		

==== Dinosaurs ====
Color key: Taxon / Reclassified taxon / Taxon falsely reported as present / Dubious taxon or junior synonym / Ichnotaxon / Ootaxon / Morphotaxon

Notes
Uncertain or tentative taxa are in small text
~~crossed out~~ taxa are discredited.

Ornithischians

Ornithischians of the Tremp Formation
Genus	Species	Locality	Stratigraphic unit	Material	Description	Images	Notes
Adynomosaurus	A. arcanus	Costa de les Solanes, near Basturs village		A set of limb elements consists of a left scapula	A lambeosaurinae hadrosaur	Adynomosaurus arcanus Arenysaurus ardevoli Pararhabdodon isonensis Rhabdodon priscus	
Arenysaurus	A. ardevoli	Conquès		A partial skull and skeleton	A lambeosaurinae hadrosaur	Adynomosaurus arcanus Arenysaurus ardevoli Pararhabdodon isonensis Rhabdodon priscus	
Calvarius	C. rapidus	Pallars Jussà, Talarn		A single fourth metatarsal	A styracosternans ornithopod	Adynomosaurus arcanus Arenysaurus ardevoli Pararhabdodon isonensis Rhabdodon priscus	
Hadrosauria	indet.	La Posa and Reptile Sst.				Adynomosaurus arcanus Arenysaurus ardevoli Pararhabdodon isonensis Rhabdodon priscus	
Iguanodontidae	indet.	La Posa				Adynomosaurus arcanus Arenysaurus ardevoli Pararhabdodon isonensis Rhabdodon priscus	
Koutalisaurus	K. kohlerorum	Sant Romà d'Abella		A right dentary	A potentially dubious genus of lambeosaurine hadrosaurid dinosaur, synonym to Pararhabdodon	Adynomosaurus arcanus Arenysaurus ardevoli Pararhabdodon isonensis Rhabdodon priscus	(Note: Considered synonymous with Pararhabdodon according to Fossilworks)
Lambeosaurinae	indet.	La Posa				Adynomosaurus arcanus Arenysaurus ardevoli Pararhabdodon isonensis Rhabdodon priscus	
Pararhabdodon	P. isonensis	Sant Romà d'Abella, Talarn		Two maxillae, two dorsal vertebrae, a complete sacrum, two fragmentary ribs, and a partial ischium	A lambeosaurine hadrosaur	Adynomosaurus arcanus Arenysaurus ardevoli Pararhabdodon isonensis Rhabdodon priscus	
Pareisactus	P. evrostos	Conquès		A scapula	A rhabdodontid ornithopod	Adynomosaurus arcanus Arenysaurus ardevoli Pararhabdodon isonensis Rhabdodon priscus	
Rhabdodon	R. priscus	La Posa			A rhabdodontid ornithopod	Adynomosaurus arcanus Arenysaurus ardevoli Pararhabdodon isonensis Rhabdodon priscus	
Nodosauridae	indet.	La Posa			First known ankylosaurid discovered	Adynomosaurus arcanus Arenysaurus ardevoli Pararhabdodon isonensis Rhabdodon priscus	
Orthomerus	O. cf. sp.	La Posa				Adynomosaurus arcanus Arenysaurus ardevoli Pararhabdodon isonensis Rhabdodon priscus	

Sauropods

Sauropods of the Tremp Formation
Genus	Species	Locality	Stratigraphic unit	Material	Description	Images	Notes
Abditosaurus	A. kuehnei	Orcau-1 (Isona), Conquès	Upper	A partial skeleton consists of fragments of the ilium, parts of the scapula, dorsal vertebrae, chevrons, a tibia, parts of the femurs and a complete humerus alongside undetermined bones.	A saltasaurid titanosaur		
Titanosaurus	T. cf. indicus	La Posa					
Hypselosaurus	H? priscus	La Posa					
Sauropoda indet.	Indeterminate	Grey Garumnian					
Titanosauria indet.	Indeterminate	Grey Garumnian	Uppermost	The proximal part of a femur, pertaining to a large titanosaur.			
Titanosauria indet.	Indeterminate	La Posa					

Theropods

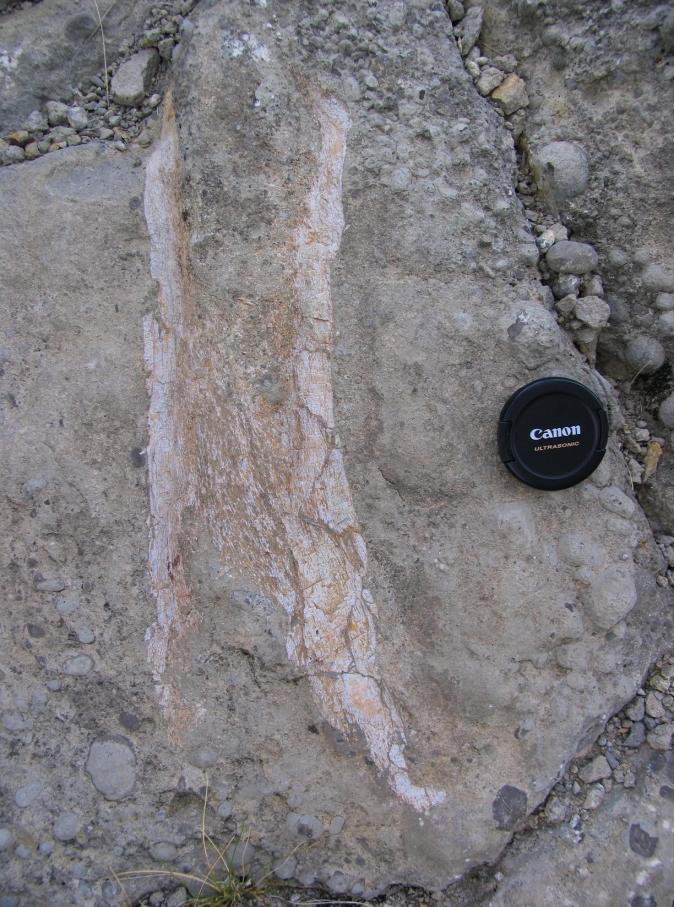
Indeterminate dinosaur bone in the Tremp Formation near Basturs

Theropods of the Tremp Formation
Genus	Species	Locality	Stratigraphic unit	Material	Description	Images	Notes
Abelisauridae indet.	Indeterminate	Grey Garuminian	Upper			Tamarro	
Ornithuromorpha indet.	Indeterminate	Serraduy	Uppermost		A large bird, similar in size to Gargantuavis	Tamarro	
Maniraptoriformes indet.	Indeterminate	Conquès				Tamarro	
Neoceratosauria indet.	Indeterminate	La Posa				Tamarro	
Paronychodon	P.? sp.	Conquès				Tamarro	
Richardoestesia	R. sp.	La Posa and Conquès				Tamarro	
Tamarro	T. insperatus	Sant Romà d'Abella site, Talarn	Upper	A metatarsal	A troodontid	Tamarro	
Theropoda indet.	Indeterminate	Reptile Sst.				Tamarro	
Velociraptorinae indet.	Indeterminate	Peguera 1		An isolated tooth		Tamarro	

==== Fish ====
Fish of the Tremp Formation
Genus	Species	Locality	Stratigraphic unit	Material	Description	Images	Notes
Batoidea	indet.	La Posa					
Hemiscyllium	H. sp.	La Posa					
Paratrygonorrhina	P. amblysoda	La Posa					
Lamniformes	indet.	La Posa					
Igdabatis	I. indicus	La Posa					
Rhombodus	R. ibericus	La Posa					
Lepisosteidae	indet.	Conquès					
Osteichthyes	indet.	La Posa					
Pycnodontiformes	indet.	Conquès					
Teleostei	indet.	Conquès					

==== Pterosauria ====
Remains of Giant Azhdarchids have been found in the Tremp Formation. They possibly share affinities with another giant Azdarchid from the coveal Marnes d'auza Formation

Pterosaurs of the Tremp Formation
Genus	Species	Locality	Stratigraphic unit	Material	Description	Images	Notes
Azhdarchidae	indet	Torrebilles-2 site	Uppermost	Several bones	An Azhdarchid		

==== Mammals ====
Mammals of the Tremp Formation
Genus	Species	Locality	Stratigraphic unit	Material	Description	Images	Notes
Adapisorex	A. sp	MP 6				Hainina Pleuraspidotherium	
Afrodon	A. ivani	MP 6 mammal zone			An adapisoriculidae	Hainina Pleuraspidotherium	
Condylarth	indet.	MP 6				Hainina Pleuraspidotherium	
Hainina	H. pyrenaica	MP 6			A multituberculate mammal	Hainina Pleuraspidotherium	
Nosella	N. europaea	MP 6				Hainina Pleuraspidotherium	
Paschatherium	P. cf. dolloi	MP 6				Hainina Pleuraspidotherium	
Pleuraspidotherium	P. sp		Upper			Hainina Pleuraspidotherium	
Teilhardimys	T. musculus	MP 6				Hainina Pleuraspidotherium	

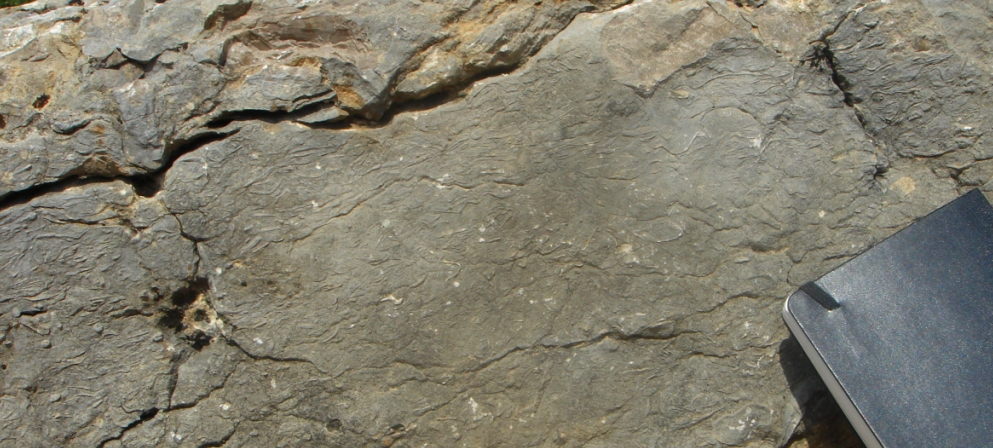
Oysters in the Tremp Formation near Isona

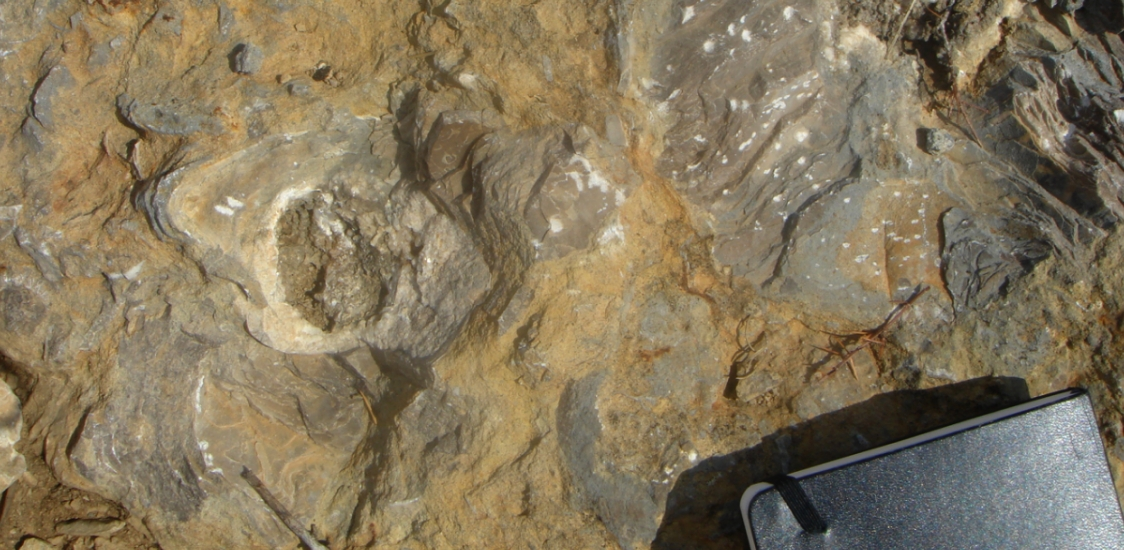
Close-up of oysters

==== Squamates ====
Squamates of the Tremp Formation
Genus	Species	Locality	Stratigraphic unit	Material	Description	Images	Notes
Alethinophidia	indet.	Conquès			An indeterminate snake		
Anguidae	indet.	Conquès			An indeterminate lizard		
Scleroglossa	indet.	Conquès			An indeterminate lizard		
Squamata	indet.	Conquès					
Lacertilia	indet.	La Posa			an indeterminate lizard		

==== Turtles ====
Turtles of the Tremp Formation
Genus	Species	Locality	Stratigraphic unit	Material	Description	Images	Notes
Bothremydidae	indet.	Conquès and Reptile Sst.					
Chelonii	indet.	Reptile Sst.					
Helochelydrinae	indet.	Conquès					
Polysternon	P. isonae	Conquès			A bothremydid turtle		
Solemys	S. sp.	Grey Garumnian					
Testudinata	indet.	La Posa					

==== Oogenus ====
Color key: Taxon / Reclassified taxon / Taxon falsely reported as present / Dubious taxon or junior synonym / Ichnotaxon / Ootaxon / Morphotaxon

Notes
Uncertain or tentative taxa are in small text
~~crossed out~~ taxa are discredited.

Egg fossils of the Tremp Formation
Genus	Species	Locality	Stratigraphic unit	Material	Description	Images	Notes
Cairanoolithus	C. roussetensis		Upper	Egg fossil	A dinosaur egg derived from a non-ornithopod ornithischian	Indeterminate dinosaur eggs in the Tremp Formation near Basturs Indeterminate dinosaur eggs in the Tremp Formation near Basturs	
Megaloolithus	M. aureliensis		Upper		A sauropod egg	Indeterminate dinosaur eggs in the Tremp Formation near Basturs Indeterminate dinosaur eggs in the Tremp Formation near Basturs	
Megaloolithus	M. baghensis	La Posa; Conquès; Lower Red Garumnian	Upper		A sauropod egg	Indeterminate dinosaur eggs in the Tremp Formation near Basturs Indeterminate dinosaur eggs in the Tremp Formation near Basturs	
Megaloolithus	M. mamillare		Upper		A sauropod egg	Indeterminate dinosaur eggs in the Tremp Formation near Basturs Indeterminate dinosaur eggs in the Tremp Formation near Basturs	
Megaloolithus	M. siruguei	Conquès; Grey Garumnian; Lower Red Garumnian	Upper		A sauropod egg	Indeterminate dinosaur eggs in the Tremp Formation near Basturs Indeterminate dinosaur eggs in the Tremp Formation near Basturs	
Prismatoolithidae	indet.	Conquès				Indeterminate dinosaur eggs in the Tremp Formation near Basturs Indeterminate dinosaur eggs in the Tremp Formation near Basturs	

==== Ichnofossils ====
Color key: Taxon / Reclassified taxon / Taxon falsely reported as present / Dubious taxon or junior synonym / Ichnotaxon / Ootaxon / Morphotaxon

Notes
Uncertain or tentative taxa are in small text
~~crossed out~~ taxa are discredited.

Ichnofossils of the Tremp Formation
Genus	Species	Locality	Stratigraphic unit	Material	Description	Images	Notes
Arenicolites	A. isp.	Lower Red Garumnian				Track occurrence in the Tremp Formation Track preservation in the Tremp Formation Track morphologies and characteristics A-F - hadrosaur tracks G - sauropod track	
Hadrosauropodus	H. sp.	Conquès; Lower Red Garumnian				Track occurrence in the Tremp Formation Track preservation in the Tremp Formation Track morphologies and characteristics A-F - hadrosaur tracks G - sauropod track	
Loloichnus	L. isp.	Lower Red Garumnian				Track occurrence in the Tremp Formation Track preservation in the Tremp Formation Track morphologies and characteristics A-F - hadrosaur tracks G - sauropod track	
Ornithopodichnites	O. magna	La Posa				Track occurrence in the Tremp Formation Track preservation in the Tremp Formation Track morphologies and characteristics A-F - hadrosaur tracks G - sauropod track	
Orcauichnites	O. garumniensis	La Posa				Track occurrence in the Tremp Formation Track preservation in the Tremp Formation Track morphologies and characteristics A-F - hadrosaur tracks G - sauropod track	
Ophiomorpha	O. sp.		Upper			Track occurrence in the Tremp Formation Track preservation in the Tremp Formation Track morphologies and characteristics A-F - hadrosaur tracks G - sauropod track	
Palaeophycus	P. isp.	Lower Red Garumnian				Track occurrence in the Tremp Formation Track preservation in the Tremp Formation Track morphologies and characteristics A-F - hadrosaur tracks G - sauropod track	
Planolites	P. isp.	Lower Red Garumnian				Track occurrence in the Tremp Formation Track preservation in the Tremp Formation Track morphologies and characteristics A-F - hadrosaur tracks G - sauropod track	
Spirographites	S. ellipticus	Conquès				Track occurrence in the Tremp Formation Track preservation in the Tremp Formation Track morphologies and characteristics A-F - hadrosaur tracks G - sauropod track	
Taenidium	T. barretti	Lower Red Garumnian				Track occurrence in the Tremp Formation Track preservation in the Tremp Formation Track morphologies and characteristics A-F - hadrosaur tracks G - sauropod track	
Taenidium	T. bowni	Lower Red Garumnian				Track occurrence in the Tremp Formation Track preservation in the Tremp Formation Track morphologies and characteristics A-F - hadrosaur tracks G - sauropod track	

== Paleoflora ==
=== Flora ===
Color key: Taxon / Reclassified taxon / Taxon falsely reported as present / Dubious taxon or junior synonym / Ichnotaxon / Ootaxon / Morphotaxon

Notes
Uncertain or tentative taxa are in small text
~~crossed out~~ taxa are discredited.

Plants of the Tremp Formation
Genus	Species	Locality	Stratigraphic unit	Material	Description	Images	Notes
Brachyphyllum	B. sp.	South Isona					
Celastrophyllum	C. bilobatum	Grey Garumnian					
Cinnamomophyllum	C. vicente-castellum	Grey Garumnian					
Cornophyllum	C. herendeenensis	Grey Garumnian					
Cunninghamites	C. cf. sp	South Isona					
Frenelopsis	F. sp.	South Isona					
Menispermophyllum	M. isonensis	Grey Garumnian					
Pandanites	P. sp.	South Isona					
Saliciphyllum	S. serratum	Grey Garumnian					
Dicotylophyllum	D. cf. proteoides	Grey Garumnian					
Sabalites	S. longirhachis	Grey Garumnian					
Alnophyllum	A. sp.	Grey Garumnian					
Betuliphyllum	B. sp.	Grey Garumnian					
Daphnogene	D. sp.	Grey Garumnian					
Ettingshausenia	E. sp.	Grey Garumnian					
Myrtophyllum	M. sp.	Grey Garumnian					
Tracheophyta	indet.	Grey Garumnian					

=== Algae ===
Algae of the Tremp Formation
Genus	Species	Locality	Stratigraphic unit	Material	Description	Images	Notes
Amblyochara	A. concava	Conquès	Upper				
Peckichara	P. sertulata	Conquès	Upper				
Microchara	M. cristata		Upper				
Microchara	M. nana		Upper				
Microchara	M. punctata		Upper				
Microchara	M. aff. laevigata		Upper				
Microchara	M. sp.		Upper				
Nitellopsis	N. (Campaniella) paracolensis		Upper				
Vidaliella	V. gerundensis		Upper				
Feistiella	F. sp.	Conquès	Upper				

Pollen

Additionally, many pollen have been described from the Tremp Formation, east of Isona and 22 kilometres (14 mi) east of Tremp:

- Polypodiaceoisporites gracicingulis, P. maximus, P. tatabanyensis, P. vitiosus
- Leiotriletes adriennis, L. dorogensis, L. microadriennis
- Cycadopites kyushuensis, C. minar
- Monocolpopollenites dorogensis, M. tranquillus
- Semioculopollis croxtonae, S. praedicatus
- Cicatricosisporites cf. triangulus
- Cupressacites insulipapillatus
- Cupuliferoipollenites pusillus
- Cyrillaceaepollenites barghoorniacus
- Granulatisporites palaeogenicus
- Inaperturopollenites giganteus
- Labraferoidaepollenites menatensis
- Laevigatosporites haardti
- Minorpollis hojstrupensis
- Nudopollis minutus
- Oculopollis cf. minoris
- Pityosporites insignis
- Plicapollis serta
- Punctatisporites luteticus
- Retitricolporites andreanszkyi
- Rugulitriporites pflugi
- Subtriporopollenites constans
- Suemigipollis cf. triangulus
- Tetracolporopollenites halimbaense
- Trilobosporites (Tuberosisporites)
- Vacuopollis cf. concavux
- Granomonocolpites
- Patellasporites
- Platycaryapollenites
- Polyporites
- Retimonocolpites

== Microbes ==
Group	Name	Member	Image	Notes
Fungi	Microcodium			
Cyanobacteria	Girvanella			

== Research and exhibitions ==
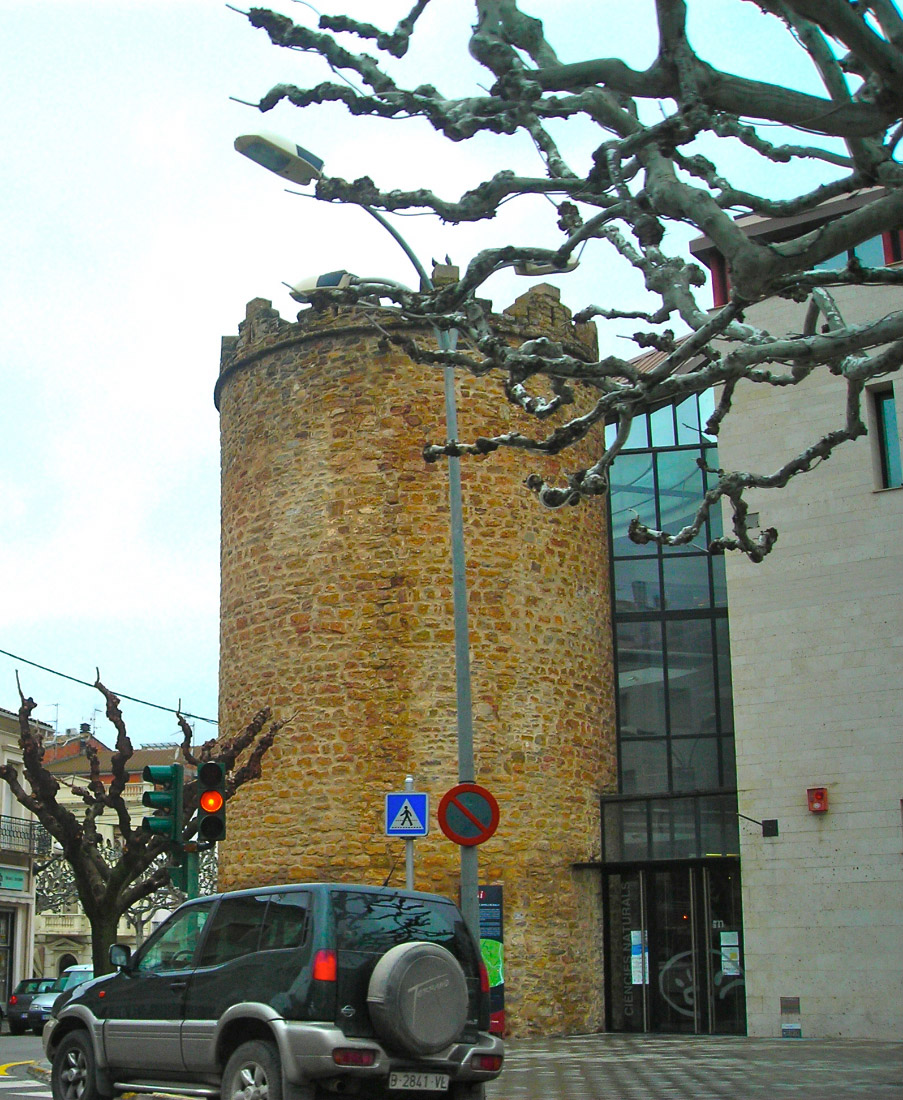
Entrance of the Museu Comarcal de Ciències Naturals next to the Torre de Soldevila in Tremp

Every year, over 800 geologists visit El Pallars Jussà and more than 1500 university students from all over Europe come to the Tremp-Graus Basin to carry out their geological fieldwork. The basin is also regarded by petroleum companies as a perfect place to study the interplay of tectonic movements with the different types of lithologies. The Museu Comarcal de Ciències Naturals ("Local District Natural Science Museum") in Tremp, built attached to the Torre de Soldevila in the center of town, is a popular destination for school visits. It houses a permanent fossil exhibition with a wide variety of remains, ranging from dinosaurs to fossilized invertebrates such as corals, bivalves, gastropods, and more.

The Museu de la Conca Dellà of Isona houses replicas of bone remains, restorations of dinosaurs and an authentic nest of eggs, left behind by the last dinosaurs to have lived in the valley during the Cretaceous period. The museum also contains numerous other archaeological remains from the Roman settlement of Isona. In recent years, the Consell Comarcal (Regional Council) has promoted several new initiatives, including the creation of a geological program especially adapted to local schools and a series of guided visits to the main archaeological sites of the region.

The unique paleoenvironment, well-exposed geology, and importance as national heritage have sparked proposals to designate the Tremp Formation and its region as a protected geological site of interest, much like the Aliaga geological park and others in Spain. After having been filed as a candidate since 2016, the Tremp Basin and surrounding areas as El Pallars Jussà, Baix Pallars to Pallars Sobirà, Coll de Nargó to l'Alt Urgell, Vilanova de Meià, Camarasa and Àger to the Noguera were included as a UNESCO Global Geopark, and included in the Global Geoparks Network. On April 17, 2018, UNESCO accepted the proposal and designated the site as Conca de Tremp-Montsec Global Geopark, stating:

"This area is internationally recognized as a natural laboratory for sedimentology, tectonics, external geodynamics, palaeontology, ore deposits and pedology. In addition, other natural and cultural heritage is also remarkable including astronomy and archaeological sites."

== Panoramas ==
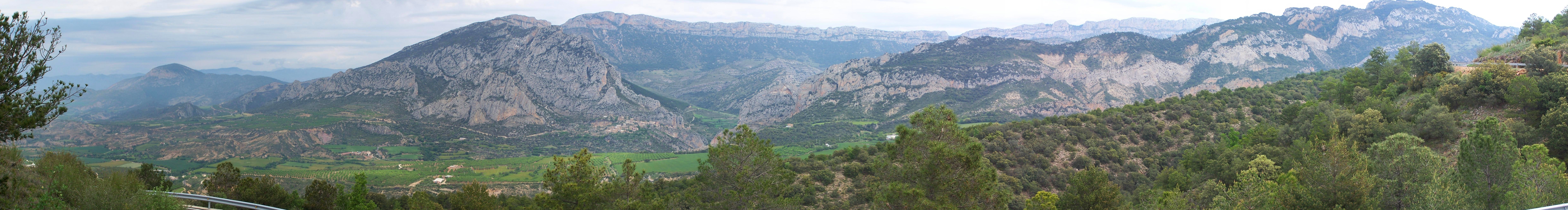
View of the eastern part of the Tremp Basin with the Tremp Formation in the foreground
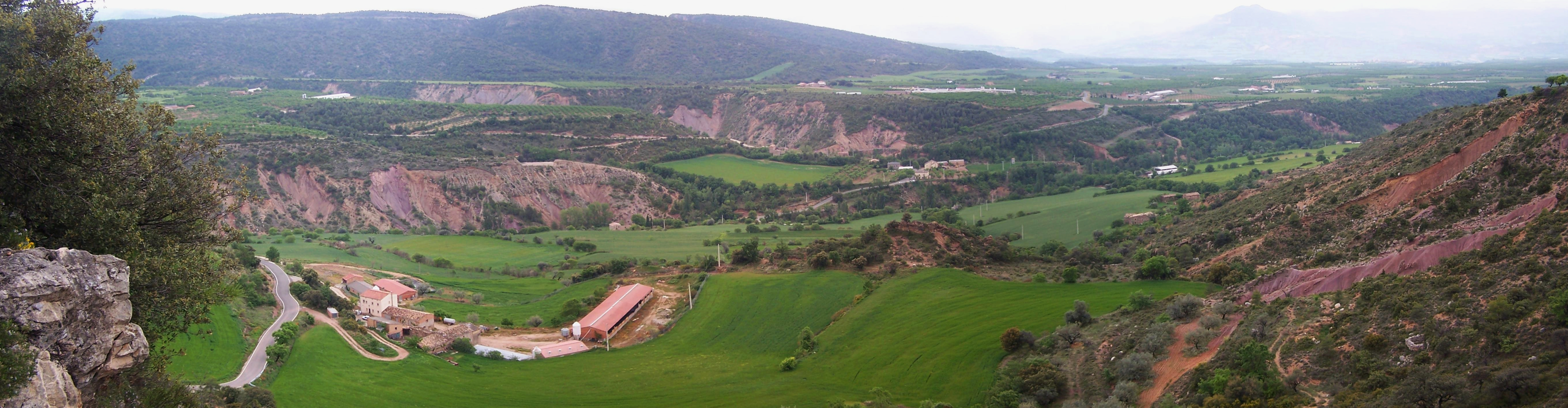
Panorama of the red beds in the Tremp Formation, from Abella de la Conca

== See also ==
- List of dinosaur-bearing rock formations
- List of Vertebrate fauna of the Maastrichtian stage
- Timeline of Cretaceous–Paleogene extinction event research
- Climate across Cretaceous–Paleogene boundary
- Geology of the Pyrenees
- Hell Creek Formation - Cretaceous-Paleogene contemporaneous fossiliferous formation of the United States
- Cerrejón Formation - Paleocene contemporaneous fossiliferous formation of Colombia

== Notes and references ==
=== Bibliography ===
==== Regional geology ====
- Andeweg, Bernd (2002), Cenozoic tectonic evolution of the Iberian Peninsula, causes and effects of changing stress fields (PhD thesis), Vrije Universiteit Amsterdam, pp. 1–192
- Barnolas, A.; Gil-Peña, I. (2001), "Ejemplos de relleno sedimentario multiepisódico en una cuenca de antepaís fragmentada: La Cuenca Surpirenaica" (PDF), Boletín Geológico y Minero, 112: 17–38 (in Spanish)
- Dinarès Turell, Jaume; McClelland, Elizabeth; Santanach, P. (1992), Contrasting rotations within thrust sheets and kinematics of thrust tectonics as derived from palaeomagnetic data: an example from the Southern Pyrenees, Thrust Tectonics, Springer, Dordrecht, pp. 265–275
- Fernández, O.; Muñoz, J.A.; Arbués, P.; Falivene, O. (2012), "3D structure and evolution of an oblique system of relaying folds: the Ainsa basin (Spanish Pyrenees)", Journal of the Geological Society, London, 169 (5): 545–559, Bibcode:2012JGSoc.169..545F, doi:10.1144/0016-76492011-068
- Ford, Mary; Hemmer, Louis; Vacherat, Arnaud; Gallagher, Kerry; Christophoul, Frédéric (2016), "Retro-wedge foreland basin evolution along the ECORS line, eastern Pyrenees, France", Journal of the Geological Society, 173 (3): 419–437, Bibcode:2016JGSoc.173..419F, doi:10.1144/jgs2015-129
- García Senz, Jesús (2002), Cuencas extensivas del Cretácico Inferior en los Pirineos Centrales, formación y subsecuente inversión (PhD. thesis), Universitat de Barcelona, pp. 1–310 (in Spanish)
- Gómez Gras, D.; Roigé, M.; Fondevilla, V.; Oms, O.; Boya, S.; Remacha, E. (2015), "Provenance constraints on the Tremp Formation paleogeography (southern Pyrenees): Ebro Massif VS Pyrenees sources" (PDF), Cretaceous Research, 57: 1–14, Bibcode:2016CrRes..57..414G, doi:10.1016/j.cretres.2015.09.010
- Meléndez, A.; Molina, E. (2008), The Cretaceous-Tertiary (KT) boundary (PDF), A. García-Cortés et al. eds. Contextos geológicos españoles. Publicaciones del Instituto Geológico y Minero de España, pp. 107–133
- Millán Garrido, H. (2000), "Actividad tectónica registrada en los depósitos del Terciario del frente meridional del Pirineo Central" (PDF), Revista de la Socieda Geológica de España, 13: 279–300 (in Spanish)
- Muñoz, Josep Anton (1992), Evolution of a continental collision belt: ECORS-Pyrenees crustal balanced cross-section, Thrust Tectonics, Springer, Dordrecht, pp. 235–246
- Nijman, Wouter (1998), "Cyclicity and basin axis shift in a piggyback basin: towards modelling of the Eocene Tremp-Àger Basin, South Pyrenees, Spain", Geological Society Special Publications, 134 (1): 135–162, Bibcode:1998GSLSP.134..135N, doi:10.1144/GSL.SP.1998.134.01.07
- Rosenbaum, Gideon; Lister, Gordon S.; Duboz, Cécile (2002), "Relative motions of Africa, Iberia and Europe during Alpine orogeny", Tectonophysics, 359 (1): 117–129, Bibcode:2002Tectp.359..117R, doi:10.1016/S0040-1951(02)00442-0
- Rushlow, Caitlin R.; Barnes, Jason B.; Ehlers, Todd A.; Vergés, Jaume (2013), "Exhumation of the southern Pyrenean fold-thrust belt (Spain) from orogenic growth to decay" (PDF), Tectonics, 32 (4): 843–860, Bibcode:2013Tecto..32..843R, doi:10.1002/tect.20030, hdl:10261/92920
- Sibuet, Jean-Claude; Srivastava, Shiri P.; Spakman, Wim (2004), "Pyrenean orogeny and plate kinematics" (PDF), Journal of Geophysical Research, 109 (B8): 1–18, Bibcode:2004JGRB..109.8104S, doi:10.1029/2003JB002514
- Teixell, Antonio; Labaume, Pierre; Lagabrielle, Yves (2016), "The crustal evolution of the west-central Pyrenees revisited: Inferences from a new kinematic scenario" (PDF), Comptes Rendus Geoscience, 348 (3–4): 257–267, Bibcode:2016CRGeo.348..257T, doi:10.1016/j.crte.2015.10.010
- Teixell, A.; Muñoz, Josep Anton (2000), "Evolución tectono-sedimentária del Pirineo meridional durante el Terciario: una síntesis basada en la transversal del Río Noguera Ribagorçana" (PDF), Revista de la Socieda Geológica de España, 13: 251–264 (in Spanish)

==== Local geology ====
- Bosch Lacalle, Albert (2004), Parque Geológico de Pallars (M.Eng. thesis) (PDF), Universitat Politécnica de Barcelona, pp. 1–123 (in Spanish)
- Díez Canseco Estebán, Davinia (2017), Caracterización de la transición marinocontinental Maastrichtiense-Daniense en el noroeste de la cuenca de Tremp-Graus - Integración de datos sedimentológicos, bioestratigráficos e icnológicos (PhD thesis) (PDF), Universidad Complutense, pp. 1–105 (in Spanish)
- Cuevas, José L. (1992), "Estratigrafia del "Garumniense" de la Conca de Tremp. Prepirineo de Lérida", Acta Geológica Hispánica, 27: 95–108 (in Spanish)
- López Martínez, N.; Ardévol, L.; Arribas Mocoroa, M.E.; Civis, J.; González Delgado, J.A. (1996), "Transición Cretácico/Terciario en depósitos continentales de la cuenca de Tremp-Graus: datos preliminares de isótopos estables de C y O" (PDF), Geogaceta, 20: 62–65 (in Spanish)
- Pujalte, V.; Schmitz, B. (2005), "Revisión de la estratigrafía del Grupo Tremp ("Garumniense", Cuenca de Tremp-Graus, Pirineos meridionales) - The stratigraphy of the Tremp Group revisited ("Garumnian", Tremp-Graus basin, South Pyrenees)" (PDF), Geogaceta, 38: 79–82 (in Spanish)
- De Renzi, Miquel (1996), "La influencia de los factores tafonómicos y paleoecológicos en la distribución de los moluscos en el área tipo del Ilerdiense (Conca de Tremp, Cataluña, España)" (PDF), Revista Española de Paleontología, Extraordinario: 204–214 (in Spanish)
- Rosell, J.; Gómez Gras, D.; Linares, R. (2013), Mapa geológico de España - 290 Isona - 1:50,000 (PDF), IGME, pp. 1–86 (in Spanish)
- Rosell, J.; Linares, R.; Llompart, C. (2001), "El "Garumiense" Prepirenáico" (PDF), Revista de la Sociedad Geológica de España, 14: 47–56 (in Spanish)
- Serra Kiel, J.; Canudo, J.; Dinarès, J.; Molina, E.; Ortiz, N.; Pascual, J.O.; Samso, J.M.; Tosquella, J. (1994), "Cronoestratigrafía de los sedimentos marinos del Terciario inferior de la Cuenca de Graus-Tremp (Zona Central Surpirenaica)" (PDF), Revista de la Sociedad Geológica de España, 7: 273–297 (in Spanish)
- Ullastre, Juan; Masriera, Alicia (1998), "Nuevas aportaciones al conocimiento estratigráfico del Paleoceno continental del Pirineo catalán (España)" (PDF), Treballs del Museu de Geología de Barcelona, 7: 95–128 (in Spanish)

==== Salt tectonics ====
- Backé, Guillaume; Baines, Graham; Giles, David (2010), Basement-involved deformation and geometry of salt diapirs in the Flinders Ranges, South Australia (PDF), GSL-SEPM Conference - Salt Tectonics, Sedimentation, and Prospectivity, p. 59
- Brown, Jonathan; Bowyer, Matthew; Zolotarenko, Vladyslav (2010), Wedges and buffers: a new structural perspective on the Dnieper-Donets Basin, onshore Ukraine (PDF), GSL-SEPM Conference - Salt Tectonics, Sedimentation, and Prospectivity, p. 80
- Claringbould, Johan S.; Sarg, J. Frederick; Hyden, Brittney B.; Trudgill, Bruce D. (2011), Three-Dimensional Structural Evolution of a Salt-Cored, Domed, Reactivated Fault Complex, Jebel Madar, Oman, AAPG Annual Convention and Exhibition, Houston, Texas, pp. 1–30
- García, Helbert; Jiménez, Giovanny (2016), "Structural analysis of the Zipaquirá Anticline (Eastern Cordillera, Colombia)", Boletín de Ciencias de la Tierra, Universidad Nacional de Colombia, 39 (39): 21–32, doi:10.15446/rbct.n39.50333
- Ghani, Humaad; Zeilinger, Gerold; Sobel, Edward R.; Heidarzadeh, Ghasem (2017), Structural Variation in Himalayan Fold and Thrust Belt, a Case Study from Kohat-Potwar Fold Thrust Belt of Pakistan (PDF), Fold and Thrust Belts: Structural style, evolution and exploration conference, p. 38
- Jaillard, Etiénne; Bouillin, Jean-Pierre; Ouali, Jamel; Dumont, Thierry; Latil, Jean-Louis; Chihaoui, Abir (2017), "Albian salt-tectonics in Central Tunisia: Evidences for an Atlantic-type passive margin", Journal of African Earth Sciences, 135: 220–234, Bibcode:2017JAfES.135..220J, doi:10.1016/j.jafrearsci.2017.09.009
- Khadivi, Shokofeh (2010), Tectonic evolution and growth of the Zagros Mountain Belt (Fars, Iran): constraints from magnetostratigraphy, sedimentology and low-temperature thermochronometry (PhD thesis) (PDF), Université Pierre & Marie Curie, pp. 1–225
- Krzywiec, Piotr; Sergés, Jaume (2006), "Salt Tectonics in Compressional Settings: Comparison of the S Pyrenees and the N Carpathians" (PDF), GeoLines, 20: 81
- Legeay, Etiénne; Ringenbach, Jean-Claude; Kergaravat, Charlie; Pichat, Alexandre; Mohn, Geoffroy; Vergés, Jaume; Kava, Kaan Sevki; Callot, Jean-Paul (2017), Structure and kinematics of the central Sivas Basin (Turkey): A fold-and-thrust belt with salt tectonics (PDF), Fold and Thrust Belts: Structural style, evolution and exploration conference, p. 20
- López Mir, Berta; Schneider, Simon; Hülse, Peter (2017), Role of tectonic inheritance in the latest Cretaceous to Paleogene Eurekan Orogeny (NE Canadian Arctic) (PDF), Fold and Thrust Belts: Structural style, evolution and exploration conference, p. 110
- López Mir, Berta; Muñoz, Josep Anton; García Senz, Jesús (2014), "Extensional salt tectonics in the partially inverted Cotiella post‑rift basin (south‑central Pyrenees): structure and evolution", International Journal of Earth Sciences, 104: 1–16
- Muñoz, Josep Anton; Roca, Eduard; Ferrer, Oriol; Rowan, Mark; Izquierdo, Esther; Pla, Oriol; Carrera, Núria; Santolaria, Pablo; Granado and Oscar Gratacos, Pablo (2017), Salt tectonics in fold and thrusts belts: examples from case studies and analogue modelling (PDF), Fold and Thrust Belts: Structural style, evolution and exploration conference, p. 16
- Parravano, Vanessa; Teixell, Antonio; Mora, Andrés (2015), "Influence of salt in the tectonic development of the frontal thrust belt of the eastern Cordillera (Guatiquía area, Colombian Andes)" (PDF), Interpretation, SAA (4): 17–27, Bibcode:2015Int.....3A..17P, doi:10.1190/INT-2015-0011.1
- Ten Veen, Johan H.; van Gessel, S.F.; den Dulk, M. (2012), "Thin-and thick-skinned salt tectonics in the Netherlands; A quantitative approach", Geologie en Mijnbouw, 91 (4): 447–464, Bibcode:2012NJGeo..91..447T, doi:10.1017/S0016774600000330

==== Paleontology publications ====
===== Dinosaurs =====
- Bravo, Ana María; Vila, Bernat; Galobart, Àngel; Oms, Oriol (2005), "Restos de huevos de dinosaurio en el Cretácico Superior del sinclinal de Vallcebre (Berguedà, provincia de Barcelona) - Remains of dinosaur eggs in the Upper Cretaceous of the Vellcebre syncline (Berguedà, Barcelona province)" (PDF), Revista Española de Paleontología, 10: 49–57 (in Spanish)
- Canudo, J.I.; Pereda Suberbiola, X.; López Martínez, N. (2000), "Los dinosaurios del maastrichtiense superior de Huesca y su importancia en el estudio de la extinción del límite Cretácico/Terciario" (PDF), Geo-Temas, 1: 339–342 (in Spanish)
- Hechenleitner, E. Martín; Grellet Tinner, Gerald; Fiorelli, Lucas E. (2015), "What do giant titanosaur dinosaurs and modern Australasian megapodes have in common?" (PDF), PeerJ, 3:e1341: 1–32
- López Martínez, Nieves; Canudo, José Ignacio; Ardèvol, Lluís; Pereda Suberbiola, Xabier; Orue Etxebarria, Xabier; Cuenca Bescós, Gloria; Ruiz Omeñaca, José Ignacio; Murelaga, Xabier; Feist, Monique (2001), "New dinosaur sites correlated with Upper Maastrichtian pelagic deposits in the Spanish Pyrenees: implications for the dinosaur extinction pattern in Europe" (PDF), Cretaceous Research, 22 (1): 41–61, Bibcode:2001CrRes..22...41L, doi:10.1006/cres.2000.0236
- Prieto Márquez, Albert; Fondevilla, Víctor; Sellés, Albert G.; Wagner, Jonathan R.; Galobart, Àngel (2019), "Adynomosaurus arcanus, a new lambeosaurine dinosaur from the Late Cretaceous Ibero-Armorican Island of the European Archipelago", Cretaceous Research, 96: 19–37, Bibcode:2019CrRes..96...19P, doi:10.1016/j.cretres.2018.12.002
- Prieto Márquez, Albert; Dalla Vecchia, Fabio M.; Gaete, Rodrigo; Galobart, Àngel (2013), "Diversity, Relationships, and Biogeography of the Lambeosaurine Dinosaurs from the European Archipelago, with Description of the New Aralosaurin Canardia garonnensis", PLoS One, 8 (7): 1–44, Bibcode:2013PLoSO...869835P, doi:10.1371/journal.pone.0069835, PMC 3724916, PMID 23922815
- Prieto Márquez, A.; Wagner, J.R. (2009), "Pararhabdodon isonensis and Tsintaosaurus spinorhinus: a new clade of lambeosaurine hadrosaurids from Eurasia", Cretaceous Research, 30 (5): 1238, Bibcode:2009CrRes..30.1238P, doi:10.1016/j.cretres.2009.06.005, hdl:2152/41080
- Prieto Márquez, A.; Gaete, R.; Rivas, G.; Galobart, Á.; Boada, M. (2006), "Hadrosauroid dinosaurs from the Late Cretaceous of Spain: Pararhabdodon isonensis revisited and Koutalisaurus kohlerorum, gen. et sp. nov.", Journal of Vertebrate Paleontology, 26 (4): 929–943, doi:10.1671/0272-4634(2006)26[929:HDFTLC]2.0.CO;2
- Vila, Bernat; Oms, Oriol; Fondevilla, Víctor; Gaete, Rodrigo; Galobart, Àngel; Riera, Violeta; Canudo, José Ignacio (2013), "The Latest Succession of Dinosaur Tracksites in Europe: Hadrosaur Ichnology, Track Production and Palaeoenvironments", PLoS One, 8 (9): 1–15, Bibcode:2013PLoSO...872579V, doi:10.1371/journal.pone.0072579, PMC 3760888, PMID 24019873
- Vila, Bernat; Jackson, Frankie D.; Fortuny, Josep; Sellés, Albert G.; Galobart, Àngel (2010), "3-D Modelling of Megaloolithid Clutches: Insights about Nest Construction and Dinosaur Behaviour", PLoS One, 5 (5): 1–13, Bibcode:2010PLoSO...510362V, doi:10.1371/journal.pone.0010362, PMC 2864735, PMID 20463953
- Weishampel, David B. (2004), Dinosaur distribution (Late Cretaceous, Europe), The Dinosauria, 2nd, Berkeley: University of California Press, pp. 588–593

===== Other groups =====
- Arribas, M.E.; Estrada, R.; Obrador, A.; Rampone, G. (1996), "Distribución y ordenación de Microcodium en la Formación Tremp: anticlinal de Campllong (Pirineos Orientales, provincia de Barcelona)" (PDF), Revista de la Sociedad Geológica de España, 9: 9–18 (in Spanish)
- Blanco, Alejandro; Fortuny, Josep; Vicente, Alba; Luján, Angel H.; García Marçà, Jordi Alexis; Sellés, Albert G. (2015a), "A new species of Allodaposuchus (Eusuchia, Crocodylia) from the Maastrichtian (Late Cretaceous) of Spain: phylogenetic and paleobiological implications" (PDF), PeerJ, 3:e1171: 1–35
- Blanco, Alejandro; Méndez, Josep M.; Marmi, Josep (2015b), "The fossil record of the uppermost Maastrichtian Reptile Sandstone (Tremp Formation, northeastern Iberian Peninsula)", Spanish Journal of Palaeontology, 30: 147–160, doi:10.7203/sjp.30.1.17231
- Blanco, Alejandro; Puértolas Pascual, Eduardo; Marmi, Josep; Vila, Bernat; Sellés, Albert G. (2014), "Allodaposuchus palustris sp. nov. from the Upper Cretaceous of Fumanya (South Eastern Pyrenees, Iberian Peninsula): Systematics, Palaeoecology and Palaeobiogeography of the Enigmatic Allodaposuchian Crocodylians", PLoS One, 9 (12): 1–34, Bibcode:2014PLoSO...9k5837B, doi:10.1371/journal.pone.0115837, PMC 4281157, PMID 25551630
- Kedves, M.; Sole de Porta, N.; De Porta, J.; Civis, J. (1985), "Estudio palinológico de los sedimentos maastrichtienses del Barranco de la Posa (Prepirineo, Lérida, España)" (PDF), An. Asoc. Palinol. LCNG. Esp., 2: 247–253 (in Spanish)
- López Martínez, Nieves; Peláez Campomanes, Pablo (1999), "New mammals from south-central Pyrenees (Tremp Formation, Spain) and their bearing on late Paleocene marine-continental correlations" (PDF), Bulletin de la Société Géologique de France, 170: 681–696
- Marmi, Josep (2016), "Taxonomic revision of the J. Vicente collection dicotyledon leaves from the lower Maastrichtian of Isona (northeastern Iberia)", Treballs del Museu de Geología de Barcelona, 22: 57–100, doi:10.32800/tmgb.2016.22.0057
- Marmi, J.; Luján, Á.H.; Riera, V.; Gaete, R.; Oms, O.; Galobart, À (2012), "The youngest species of Polysternon: A new bothremydid turtle from the uppermost Maastrichtian of the southern Pyrenees", Cretaceous Research, 35: 133–142, Bibcode:2012CrRes..35..133M, doi:10.1016/j.cretres.2011.12.004
- Párraga, Javier; Prieto Márquez, Albert (2019), "Pareisactus evrostos, a new basal iguanodontian (Dinosauria: Ornithopoda) from the Upper Cretaceous of southwestern Europe", Zootaxa, 4555 (2): 247–258, doi:10.11646/zootaxa.4555.2.5, PMID 30790960
- Peláez Campomanes, P.; López Martínez, N.; Álvarez Sierra, M.A.; Daams, R. (2000), "The earliest mammal of the European Paleocene: the multituberculate Hainina" (PDF), Journal of Paleontology, 74 (4): 701–711, doi:10.1666/0022-3360(2000)074<0701:TEMOTE>2.0.CO;2
- Puértolas Pascual, E.; Canudo, J.I.; Moreno Azanza, M. (2014), "The eusuchian crocodylomorph Allodaposuchus subjuniperus sp. nov., a new species from the latest Cretaceous (upper Maastrichtian) of Spain", Historical Biology, 26 (1): 91–109, Bibcode:2014HBio...26...91P, doi:10.1080/08912963.2012.763034
- Puértolas Pascual, E.; Cruzado Caballero, P.; Canudo, J.I.; Gasca, J.M.; Moreno Azanza, M.; Castanera, D.; Parrilla, J.; Ezquerro, L. (2012), "Nuevos yacimientos de vertebrados del Maastrichtiense superior (Cretácico Superio) de Huesca (España) - New vertebrate sites of the late Maastrichtian (Upper Cretaceous) from Huesca (Spain)" (PDF), Geo-Temas, 14: 1–4 (in Spanish)
- Puértolas, Eduardo; Canudo, José I.; Cruzado Caballero, Penélope (2011), "A New Crocodylian from the Late Maastrichtian of Spain: Implications for the Initial Radiation of Crocodyloids", PLoS One, 6 (6): 1–12, Bibcode:2011PLoSO...620011P, doi:10.1371/journal.pone.0020011, PMC 3110596, PMID 21687705
- Puértolas, E.; Cruzado Cabellero, P.; Badiola, A.; Gasca, J.M.; Moreno Azanza, M.; Canudo, J.I. (2010), Nuevo crocodilomorfo eusuquio de la cuenca de Tremp (Maastrichtiense superior, Arén, Huesca, España) - New eusuchian crocodilomorph from the Tremp basin (late Maastrichtian, Arén, Huesca, Spain) (PDF), V Jornadas Internacionales sobre Paleontología de Dinosaurios y su Entorno, pp. 71–74 (in Spanish)
