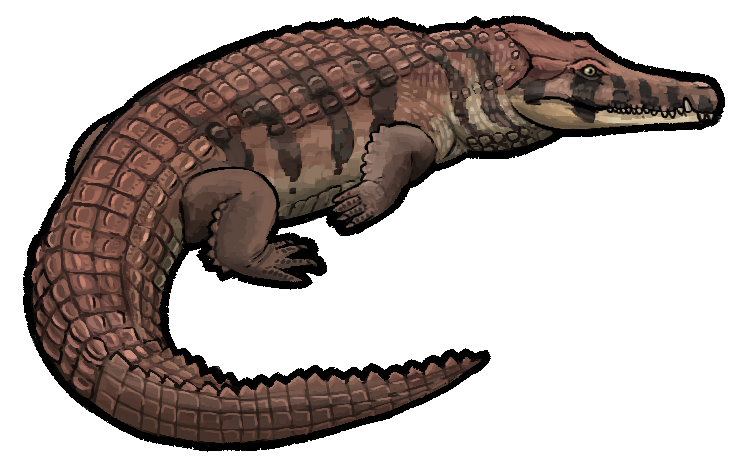

Scientific classification
- Kingdom: Animalia
- Phylum: Chordata
- Class: Reptilia
- Clade: Pseudosuchia
- Clade: Crocodylomorpha
- Genus: †Portugalosuchus; Mateus et al., 2018
- Species: †P. azenhae

Binomial name
- †Portugalosuchus azenhae Mateus et al., 2018

= Portugalosuchus =

Portugalosuchus Temporal range: Late Cretaceous: Cenomanian, 99.7–94.3 Ma

Extinct genus of reptiles

Portugalosuchus (meaning "crocodile from Portugal") is an extinct genus of eusuchian crocodyliform that was possibly a basal crocodylian – if so then it would be the oldest known crocodylian to date. The type species is P. azenhae, described in 2018, and it is known from the Upper Cretaceous Cenomanian Tentugal Formation in Portugal. A 2021 morphological study recovered Portugalosuchus within Crocodylia as a member of Gavialidae closely related to similar "thoracosaurs" (e.g. Thoracosaurus), while also noting that it might also possibly be outside of Crocodylia completely. A 2022 tip dating analysis incorporating both morphological and DNA data placed Portugalosuchus outside of Crocodylia, as the sister taxon of the family Allodaposuchidae. A cladogram simplified after that analysis is shown below:

- Eusuchia
  - - Hylaeochampsa
    - - Acynodon
      - Iharkutosuchus
  - - - Portugalosuchus
      - - - Agaresuchus
          - Lohuecosuchus
        - - Allodaposuchus
          - Arenysuchus
    - - "Thoracosaurs"
      - - Borealosuchus
        - - Planocraniidae
          - Crocodylia

The morphology-based phylogenetic analyses based on the new neuroanatomical data obtained from its skull using micro-CT scans suggested that this taxon is a crown group crocodilian and a member of the 'thoracosaurs', recovered as a sister taxon of Thoracosaurus within Gavialoidea, though it is uncertain whether 'thoracosaurs' were true gavialoids.
