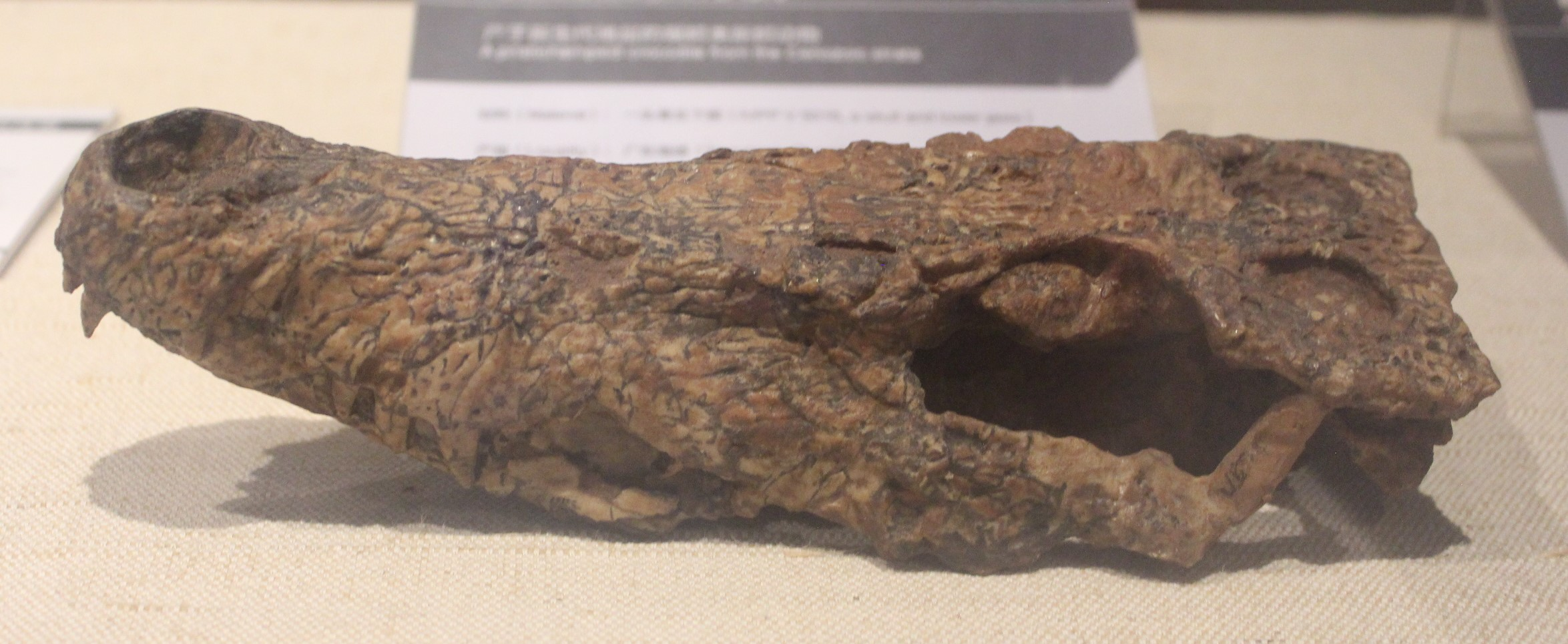
- Holotype skull (IVPP V5016) of P. datangensis, Paleozoological Museum of China

Scientific classification
- Kingdom: Animalia
- Phylum: Chordata
- Class: Reptilia
- Clade: Pseudosuchia
- Clade: Crocodylomorpha
- Clade: Eusuchia
- Family: †Planocraniidae
- Genus: †Planocrania; Li, 1976

Species
- †P. datangensis Li, 1976 (type); †P. hengdongensis Li, 1984

= Planocrania =

Planocrania Temporal range: Paleocene, 61.6–56 Ma

Extinct genus of reptiles

Planocrania is an extinct genus of eusuchian crocodyliforms from what is now China. Two species are currently known to belong to the genus.

== History ==
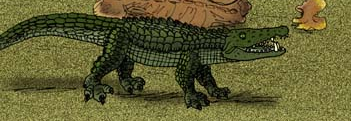
Life reconstruction

The type species, Planocrania datangensis, was named in 1976 from material found from Nanxiong in Guangdong Province, China, and the new genus Planocrania was placed in a newly erected family Planocraniidae. A second species, Planocrania hengdongensis, is known from Hengdong County in Hunan Province and was described in 1984.

Planocrania was subsequently included in the family Pristichampsidae along with the genus Pristichampsus. Both genera were previously assigned to the subfamily Pristichampsinae within the family Crocodylidae before they were placed in their own family, the Pristichampsidae.

However, in a 2013 phylogenetic analysis, the two Asian species of Planocrania were found to be most closely related to the North American and European Boverisuchus, and the family Planocraniidae was reinstated to contain these genera and replace Pristichampsidae.

== Phylogeny ==
Phylogenetic analyses based purely on morphological data have generally placed planocraniids in a basal position within the crocodilian crown group. Some of these analyses have found that planocraniids lie just outside Brevirostres, a group that includes alligators, caimans, and crocodiles but not gharials. However, molecular studies using DNA sequencing have found the group Brevirostres to be invalid upon finding that crocodiles and gavialids are more closely related than alligators.

A 2018 tip dating study by Lee & Yates using both molecular, morphological and stratigraphic data instead recovered the planocraniids outside crown group Crocodylia. Below is a cladogram from that study:

- - Goniopholis†
  - - - Bernissartia†
      - Shamosuchus†
    - Eusuchia
      - - Acynodon†
        - Hylaeochampsidae†
          Hylaeochampsa†
      - - Allodaposuchidae†
          - Allodaposuchus†
          - Lohuecosuchus†
        - - - Borealosuchus†
            - "Thoracosaurs"
              - Eothoracosaurus†
              - - Thoracosaurus†
                - - Argochampsa†
                  - - Eogavialis†
                    - Eosuchus†
          - - Planocraniidae†
              - Planocrania hengdongensis†
              - - Planocrania datangensis†
                - Boverisuchus†
            - Crocodylia

In 2021, Rio & Mannion conducted a new phylogenetic study using a heavily modified morphological data set, and also noted the lack of consensus and difficulty in placing Planocraniidae. In their study, they recovered Planocraniidae within Crocodylia, as the sister group to Longirostres, as shown in the cladogram below:

- Eusuchia
  - Hylaeochampsidae†
  - - Allodaposuchidae†
    - - Borealosuchus†
      - Crocodylia
        - Alligatoroidea
        - - Planocraniidae†
            - Planocrania datangensis†
            - - Planocrania hengdongensis†
              - - Boverisuchus magnifrons†
                - Boverisuchus vorax†
          - Longirostres
            - Gavialoidea
            - Crocodyloidea
