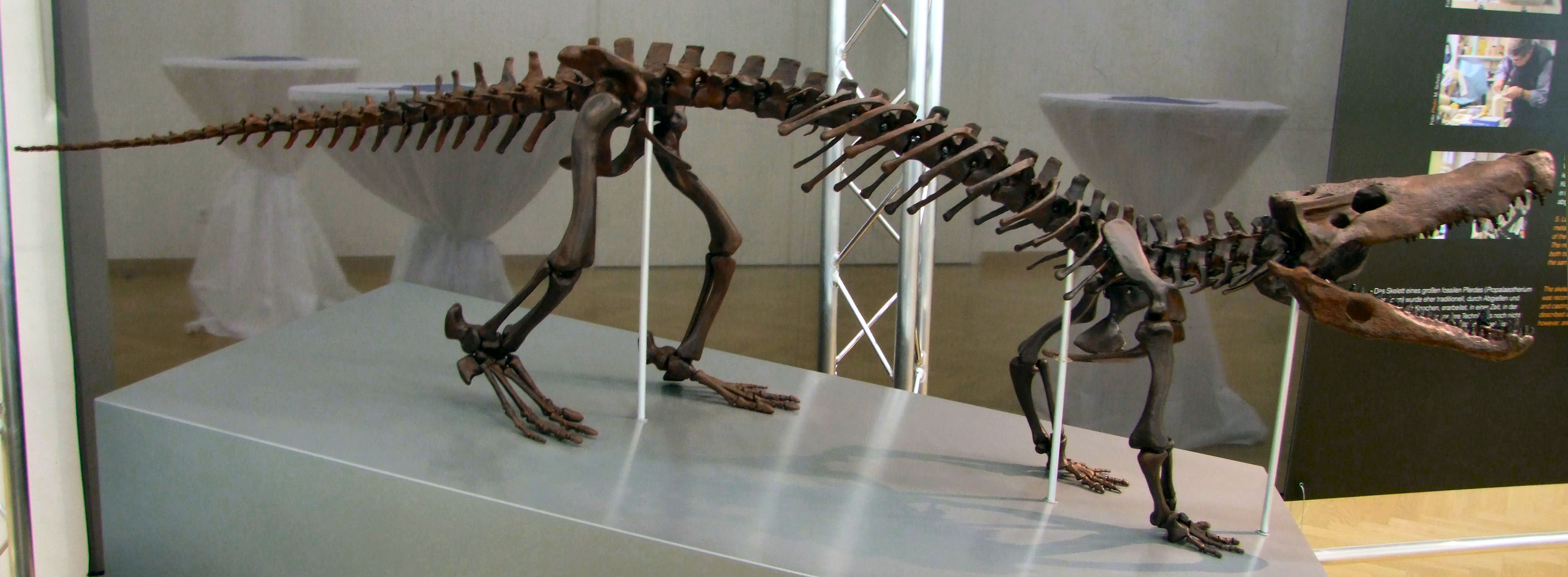
- Reconstructed skeleton of the european species, B. magnifrons
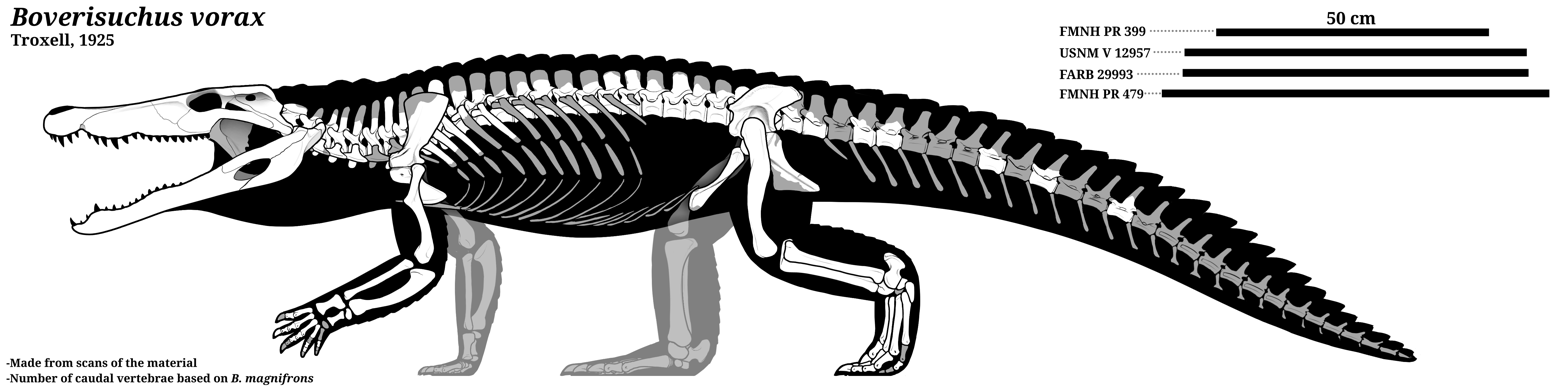
- Skeletal reconstruction of the North American species, B. vorax

Scientific classification
- Kingdom: Animalia
- Phylum: Chordata
- Class: Reptilia
- Clade: Pseudosuchia
- Clade: Crocodylomorpha
- Clade: Eusuchia
- Family: †Planocraniidae
- Genus: †Boverisuchus; Kuhn, 1938

Type species
- †Boverisuchus magnifrons Kuhn, 1938

Species
- †B. magnifrons Kuhn, 1938 (type); †B. vorax (Troxell, 1925)

Synonyms
- Crocodylus vorax Troxell, 1925; Pristichampsus vorax (Troxell, 1925) Langston, 1975; Weigeltisuchus Kuhn, 1938; Weigeltisuchus geiseltalensis Kuhn, 1938

= Boverisuchus =

Boverisuchus Temporal range: Early-Middle Eocene (Ypresian to Lutetian) 50.3–41.2 Ma

Extinct genus of reptiles

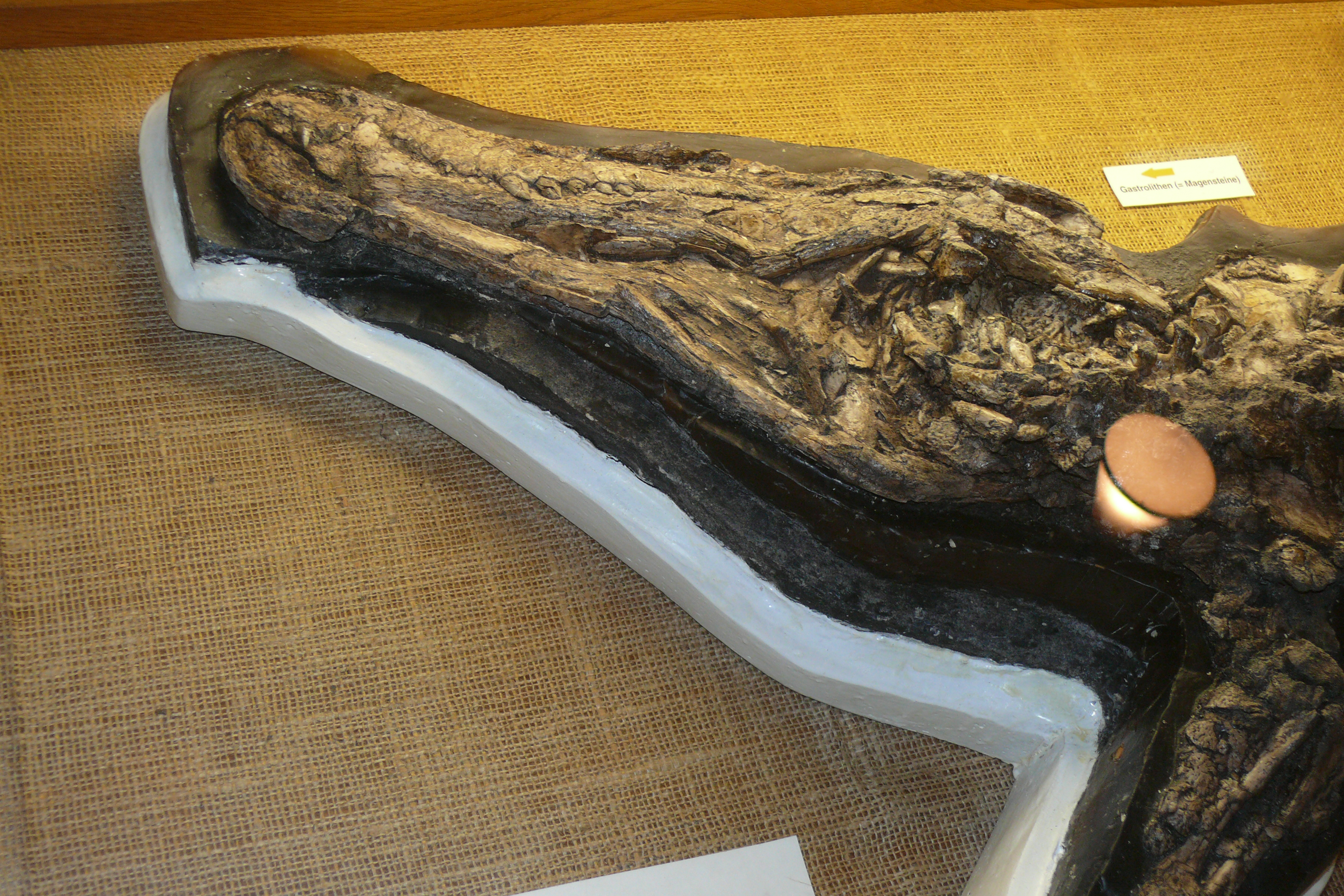
Skull of B. magnifrons ("W. geiseltalensis") in the Geisel valley museum

Boverisuchus is an extinct genus of planocraniid crocodyliforms known from the early to middle Eocene (Ypresian to Lutetian stages) of Germany and western North America. It was a relatively small crocodyliform with an estimated total length of approximately 2.2–3.6 metres (7.2–11.8 ft) and a weight of around 100 kilograms (220 lb).

== History ==
The type species Boverisuchus magnifrons was first named by paleontologist Oskar Kuhn in 1938, from the Lutetian of Germany alongside Weigeltisuchus geiseltalensis. Most paleontologists have considered both species to represent junior synonyms of the type species of Pristichampsus, P. rollinatii. Following a revision of the genus Pristichampsus by Brochu (2013), P. rollinati was found to be based on insufficiently diagnostic material and therefore is a nomen dubium while Boverisuchus was reinstated as a valid genus. Brochu (2013) also assigned Crocodylus vorax, which has been referred to as Pristichampsus vorax since Langston (1975), as the second species of Boverisuchus. According to Brochu (2013), material from the middle Eocene of Italy and Texas may represent another yet unnamed species. The two Asian species of Planocrania were found to be most closely related to Boverisuchus using a phylogenetic analysis. The name Planocraniidae was reinstated to contain these genera and replace Pristichampsidae.

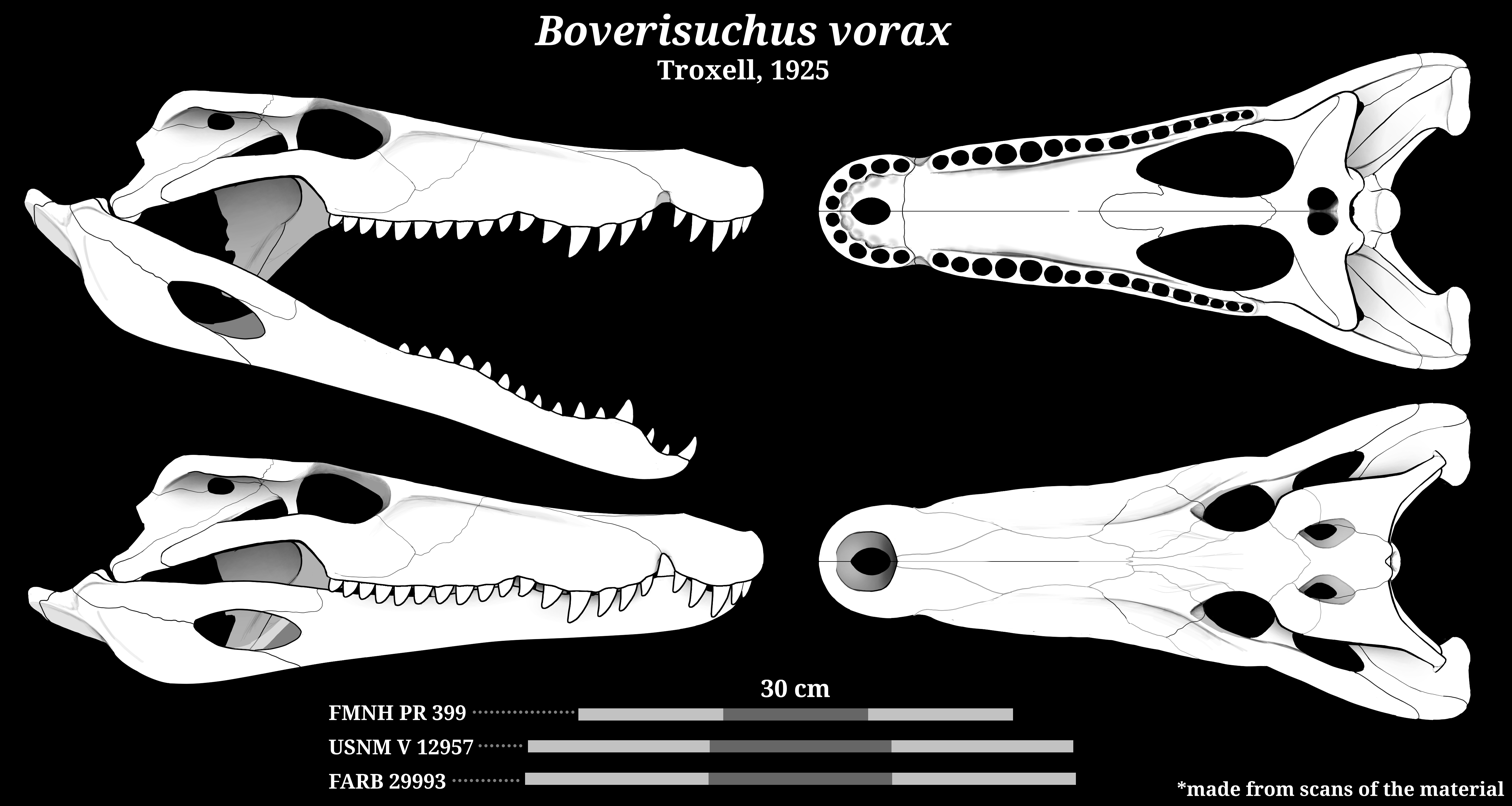
Skull diagram (top) and life reconstruction (bottom) of B. vorax

== Phylogeny ==
Phylogenetic analyses based purely on morphological data have generally placed Planocraniidae in a basal position within the crocodilian crown group. Some of these analyses have found that planocraniids lie just outside Brevirostres, a group that includes alligators, caimans, and crocodiles but not gharials. However, molecular studies using DNA sequencing have found the group Brevirostres to be invalid upon finding that crocodiles and gavialids are more closely related than alligators.

A 2018 tip dating study by Lee & Yates using both molecular, morphological and stratigraphic data instead recovered the planocraniids outside crown group Crocodylia. Below is a cladogram from that study:

- - Goniopholis†
  - - - Bernissartia†
      - Shamosuchus†
    - Eusuchia
      - - Acynodon†
        - Hylaeochampsidae†
          Hylaeochampsa†
      - - Allodaposuchidae†
          - Allodaposuchus†
          - Lohuecosuchus†
        - - - Borealosuchus†
            - "Thoracosaurs"
              - Eothoracosaurus†
              - - Thoracosaurus†
                - - Argochampsa†
                  - - Eogavialis†
                    - Eosuchus†
          - - Planocraniidae†
              - Planocrania hengdongensis†
              - - Planocrania datangensis†
                - Boverisuchus†
            - Crocodylia

In 2021, Rio & Mannion conducted a new phylogenetic study using a heavily modified morphological data set, and also noted the lack of consensus and difficulty in placing Planocraniidae. In their study, they recovered Planocraniidae within Crocodylia, as the sister group to Longirostres, as shown in the cladogram below:

- Eusuchia
  - Hylaeochampsidae†
  - - Allodaposuchidae†
    - - Borealosuchus†
      - Crocodylia
        - Alligatoroidea
        - - Planocraniidae†
            - Planocrania datangensis†
            - - Planocrania hengdongensis†
              - - Boverisuchus magnifrons†
                - Boverisuchus vorax†
          - Longirostres
            - Gavialoidea
            - Crocodyloidea

== Description ==
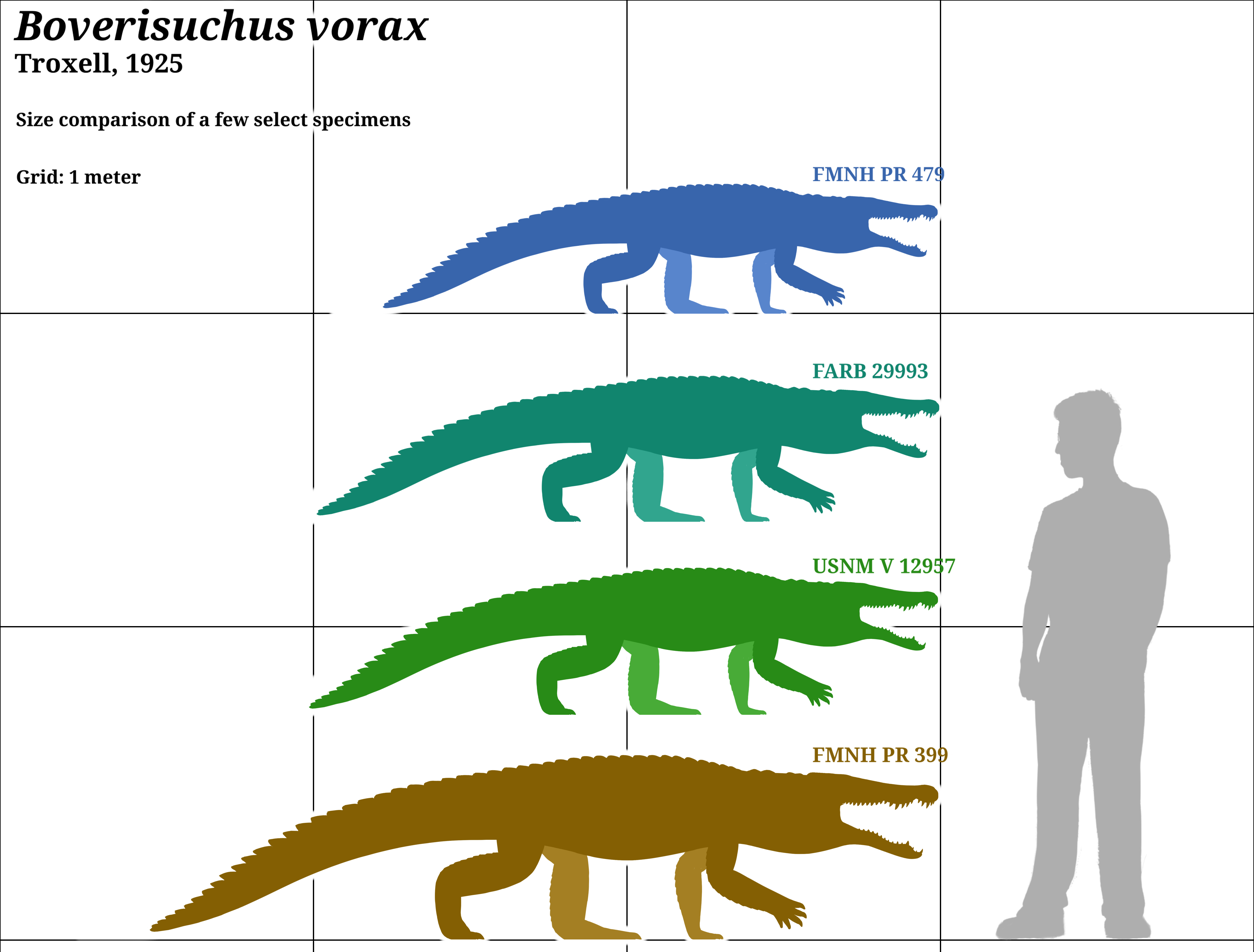
Size comparison of different B. vorax specimens

Based on other planocraniids, Boverisuchus is assumed to have had heavily armoured skin, and long limbs suggesting a cursorial (i.e. running) habitus. It also had hoof-like toes, suggesting that it lived more on land than in the water, and that it therefore probably hunted terrestrial mammals.

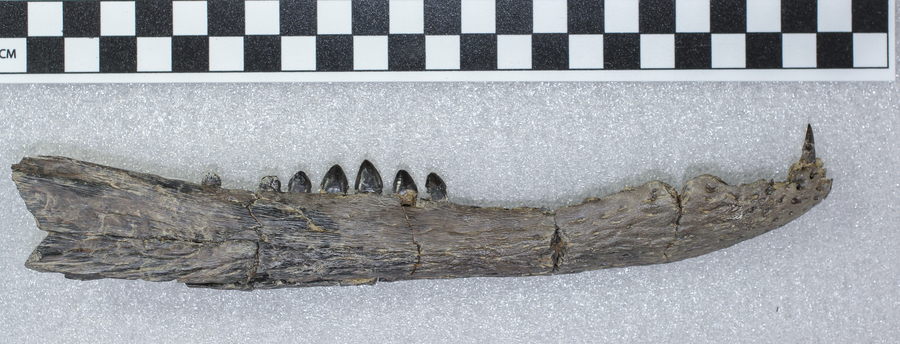
Lower jaw

The teeth of Boverisuchus were ziphodont; i.e., laterally compressed, sharp, and with serrated edges (characteristic of terrestrial crocodyliforms that are unable to dispatch their prey by drowning them). Due to their similarity to those of certain theropod dinosaurs they were initially mistaken for theropod teeth, leading paleontologists to believe that some non-avian dinosaurs survived the Cretaceous–Paleogene extinction event.

Some material referred to Pristichampsus rollinatii shows further features adapting the animal to this lifestyle. The tail was more reminiscent of a dinosaur's, being round in cross-section and lacking the osteoderm crest observed in extant crocodile species. It would also have been capable of galloping.

== Paleoecology ==
The North American B. vorax is known from the Bridger Formation, where it coexisted with various large predatory mammals such as the mesonychids Harpagolestes and Mesonyx and the oxyaenid Patriofelis. Stomach contents of B. vorax indicate it preyed on the tapiroid Helaletes.

== See also ==
- Barinasuchus
