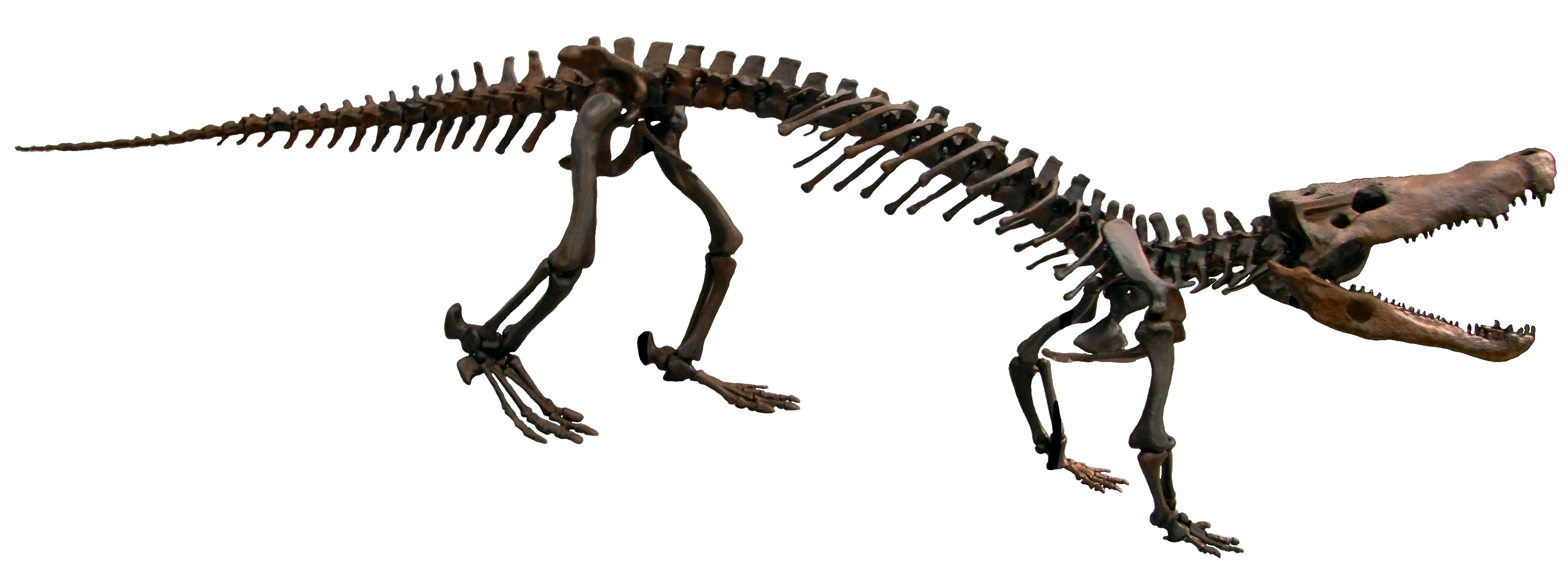
- Skeleton of Boverisuchus magnifrons

Scientific classification
- Kingdom: Animalia
- Phylum: Chordata
- Class: Reptilia
- Clade: Archosauria
- Clade: Pseudosuchia
- Clade: Crocodylomorpha
- Clade: Neosuchia
- Clade: Eusuchia
- Family: †Planocraniidae; Li, 1976

Type genus
- Planocrania Li, 1976

Genera
- †Boverisuchus; †Duerosuchus; †Planocrania

= Planocraniidae =

Planocraniidae Temporal range: Paleocene - Eocene, 61.6–40 Ma

Extinct family of reptiles

Planocraniidae is an extinct family of eusuchian crocodyliforms known from the Paleogene of Asia, Europe and North America. The family was coined by Li in 1976, and contains three genera, Boverisuchus, Duerosuchus and Planocrania. Planocraniids were highly specialized crocodyliforms that were adapted to living on land. They had extensive body armor, long legs, and blunt claws resembling hooves, and are sometimes informally called "hoofed crocodiles".

== Classification ==
Prior to 2013, the term Pristichampsidae/Pristichampsinae was used for this group. However, the type specimen of Pristichampsus was found to be undiagnostic, and considered to be a nomen dubium. As such, Brochu (2013) transferred the other species placed in Pristichampsus to Boverisuchus, and resurrected Planocraniidae to replace Pristichampsidae/Pristichampsinae as the name for the clade. Brochu cladistically defined Planocraniidae as Planocrania hengdongensis and crocodyliforms more closely related to it than to Alligator mississippiensis (American alligator), Crocodylus niloticus (Nile crocodile), Gavialis gangeticus (gharial), Thoracosaurus macrorhynchus, Allodaposuchus precedens, or Hylaeochampsa vectiana.

Phylogenetic analyses based purely on morphological data have generally placed planocraniids in a basal position within the crocodilian crown group. Some of these analyses have found that planocraniids lie just outside Brevirostres, a group that includes alligators, caimans, and crocodiles but not gharials. However, molecular studies using DNA sequencing have found the group Brevirostres to be invalid upon finding that crocodiles and gavialids are more closely related than alligators.

A 2018 tip dating study by Lee & Yates using both molecular, morphological and stratigraphic data instead recovered the planocraniids outside crown group Crocodylia. Below is a cladogram from that study:

- - Goniopholis†
  - - - Bernissartia†
      - Shamosuchus†
    - Eusuchia
      - - Acynodon†
        - Hylaeochampsidae†
          Hylaeochampsa†
      - - Allodaposuchidae†
          - Allodaposuchus†
          - Lohuecosuchus†
        - - - Borealosuchus†
            - "Thoracosaurs"
              - Eothoracosaurus†
              - - Thoracosaurus†
                - - Argochampsa†
                  - - Eogavialis†
                    - Eosuchus†
          - - Planocraniidae†
              - Planocrania hengdongensis†
              - - Planocrania datangensis†
                - Boverisuchus†
            - Crocodylia

In 2021, Rio & Mannion conducted a new phylogenetic study using a heavily modified morphological data set, and also noted the lack of consensus and difficulty in placing Planocraniidae. In their study, they recovered Planocraniidae within Crocodylia, as the sister group to Longirostres, as shown in the cladogram below:

- Eusuchia
  - Hylaeochampsidae†
  - - Allodaposuchidae†
    - - Borealosuchus†
      - Crocodylia
        - Alligatoroidea
        - - Planocraniidae†
            - Planocrania datangensis†
            - - Planocrania hengdongensis†
              - - Boverisuchus magnifrons†
                - Boverisuchus vorax†
          - Longirostres
            - Gavialoidea
            - Crocodyloidea

== Description ==
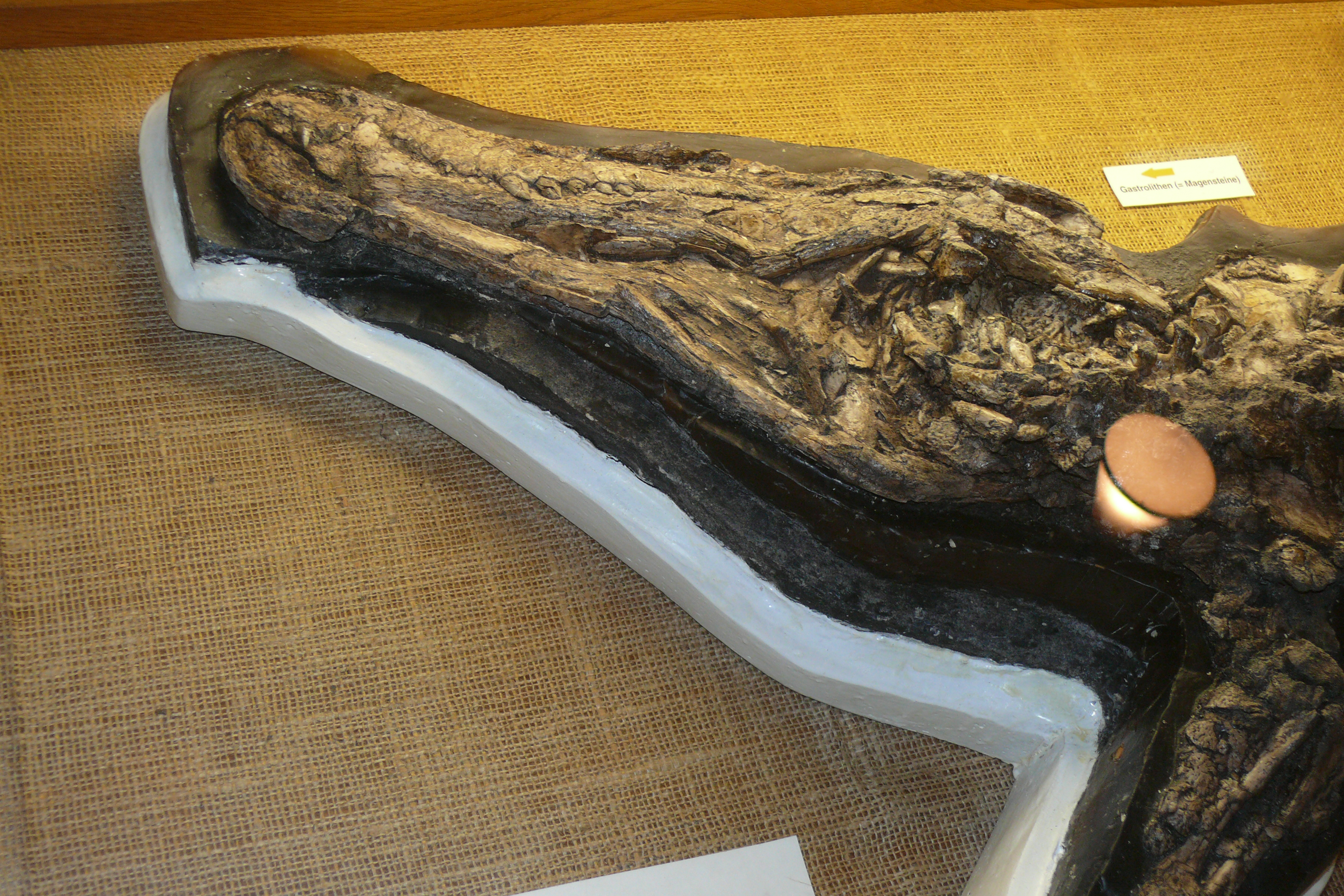
Skull of holotype of the extinct crocodile "Weigeltisuchus geiseltalensis" KUHN, 1938 (specimen no. GMH Leo X 8001; subsequently "Pristichampsus geiseltalensis", now referred to Boverisuchus magnifrons KUHN, 1938)

Planocraniids were land-living (terrestrial) crocodyliforms with longer legs than living crocodilians. They grew to a maximum size of 2 to 3 metres (6.6 to 9.8 ft) in length. Nearly complete skeletons of Boverisuchus indicate that planocraniids were more heavily armored than living crocodilians, with bony plates called osteoderms tightly interlocking along the back, completely encasing the tail, and extending down the legs. The claws were blunt and have been described as hoof-like in shape, suggesting that planocraniids may have been unguligrade, walking on the tips of their toes like mammalian ungulates. The areas on the leg bones where muscles attach were in different positions in planocraniids than they are in living crocodilians, possibly as an adaptation to walking on land.

While most crocodilians have flattened skulls, planocraniids had tall and narrow (or laterally compressed) skulls. Their teeth were also laterally compressed and not conical like those of modern crocodilians. The combination of a laterally compressed skull and laterally compressed teeth is called the "ziphodont" condition.

The teeth of the upper jaw completely overlapped the teeth of the lower jaw when the mouth was closed, giving planocraniids an alligator-like overbite. Planocraniids had a notch between the premaxilla bone at the tip of the upper jaw and the maxilla behind it. Living crocodiles also have this notch, which provides room for the enlarged fourth tooth of the lower jaw when the mouth is closed. In planocraniids the fourth tooth was small and did not fit into the notch.

== Evolution ==
The evolution of Planocraniidae occurred after the K-Pg extinction; as with the contemporary mesonychians (the first large mammalian carnivores), it is likely that planocraniids evolved as terrestrial carnivores in order to take advantage of the extinction of non-avian theropods that had been previously dominating this niche.
