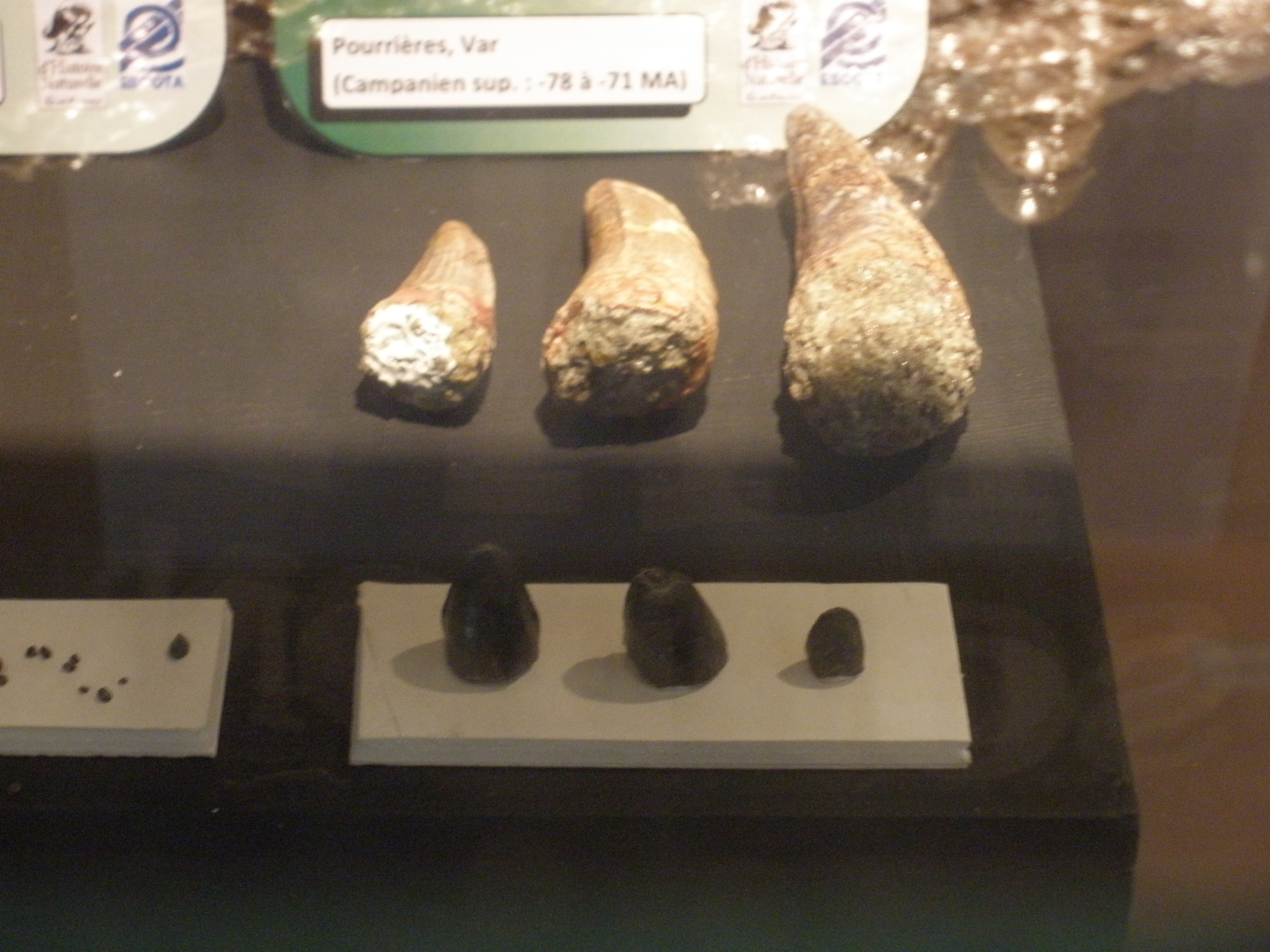
- Teeth of Ischyrochampsa meridionalis

Scientific classification
- Domain: Eukaryota
- Kingdom: Animalia
- Phylum: Chordata
- Class: Reptilia
- Clade: Archosauria
- Clade: Pseudosuchia
- Clade: Crocodylomorpha
- Clade: Crocodyliformes
- Clade: Eusuchia
- Clade: †Allodaposuchidae
- Genus: †Ischyrochampsa; Vasse, 1995

Type species
- †Ischyrochampsa meridionalis Vasse, 1995

= Ischyrochampsa =

Ischyrochampsa Temporal range: Late Cretaceous, 84.9–70.6 Ma

Extinct genus of reptiles

Ischyrochampsa is an extinct monospecific genus of Late Cretaceous crocodyliform belonging to the eusuchian clade Allodaposuchidae. Fossils of the type species I. meridionalis are late Campanian in age and were found in the commune of Saint-Estève-Janson in Bouches-du-Rhône, France. Material is also known from Spain. It was named and described in 1995, and it had an estimated length of over 4 metres (13 ft).

Ischyrochampsa was first classified as a trematochampsid, but was removed from the group by subsequent studies. In their description of Allodaposuchus remains from southern France, Martin and his colleagues treated the genus as a possible junior synonym of Allodaposuchus.
