= Berganuy =

- Locality
- Location within Aragon Location within Spain
- Coordinates: 42°15′23″N 0°40′56″E
- Country: Spain
- Autonomous community: Aragon
- Province: Province of Huesca
- Municipality: Arén
- Elevation: 863 m (2,831 ft)

Population
  - Total: 0

Berganuy is a locality located in the municipality of Arén, in Huesca province, Aragon, Spain. As of 2020, it has a population of 0.

== Geography ==
Berganuy is located 134km east of Huesca.
