= Rivera de Vall =

- Locality
- Location within Aragon Location within Spain
- Coordinates: 42°17′24″N 0°40′29″E
- Country: Spain
- Autonomous community: Aragon
- Province: Province of Huesca
- Municipality: Arén
- Elevation: 824 m (2,703 ft)

Population
  - Total: 5

Rivera de Vall is a locality located in the municipality of Arén, in Huesca province, Aragon, Spain. As of 2020, it has a population of 5.

== Geography ==
Rivera de Vall is located 138km east-northeast of Huesca.
