= Betesa =

- Locality
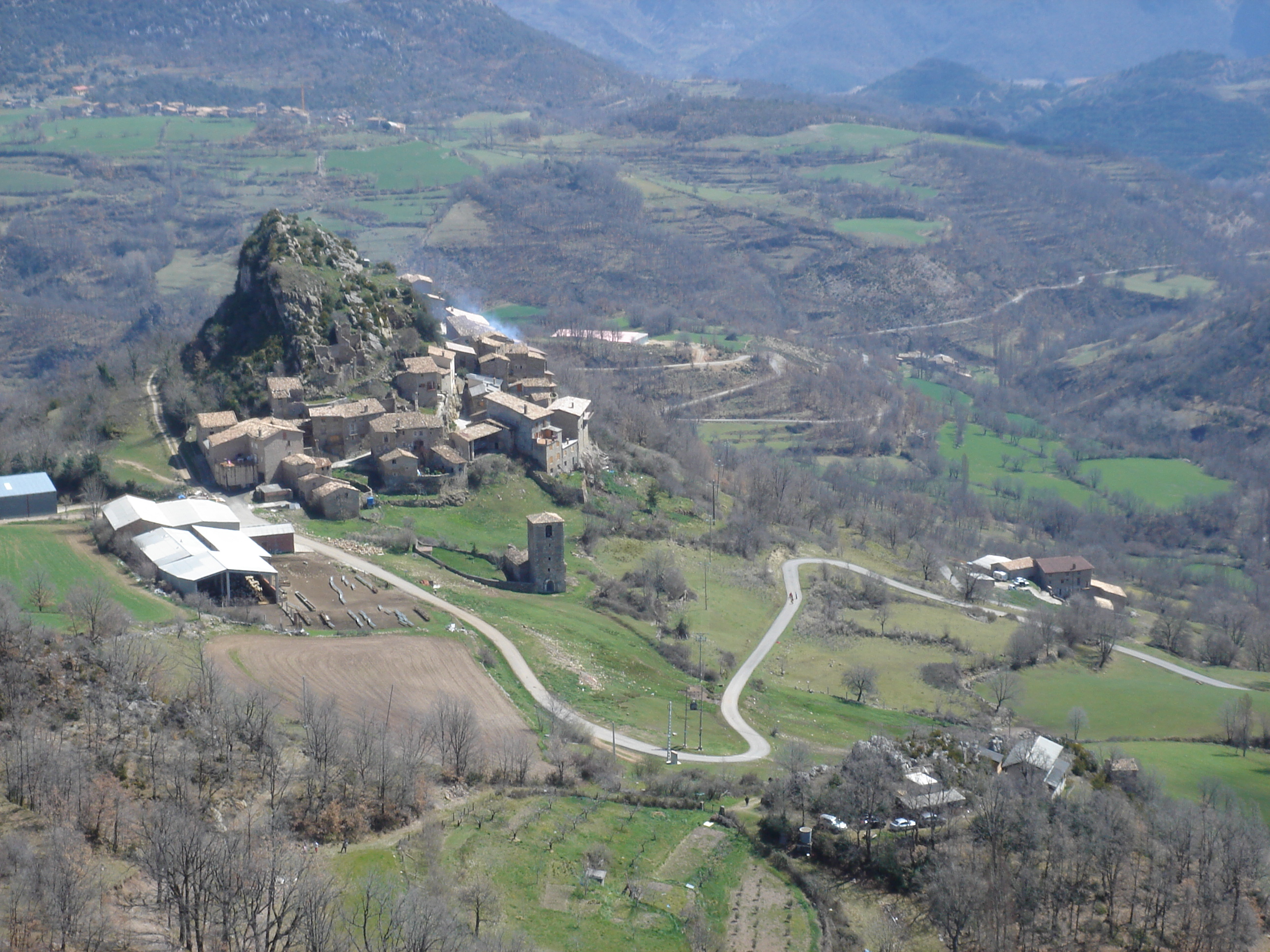

- Location within Aragon Location within Spain
- Coordinates: 42°21′8″N 0°41′28″E
- Country: Spain
- Autonomous community: Aragon
- Province: Province of Huesca
- Municipality: Arén
- Elevation: 1,129 m (3,704 ft)

Population
  - Total: 2

Betesa is a locality situated in the municipality of Arén, in Huesca province, Aragon, Spain. As of 2020, it has a population of 2.

== Geography ==
Betesa is located 145km east-northeast of Huesca.
