= San Martín (Huesca) =

- Locality
- Location within Aragon Location within Spain
- Coordinates: 42°18′16″N 0°40′21″E
- Country: Spain
- Autonomous community: Aragon
- Province: Province of Huesca
- Municipality: Arén
- Elevation: 954 m (3,130 ft)

Population
  - Total: 4

San Martín is a locality located in the municipality of Arén, in Huesca province, Aragon, Spain. As of 2020, it has a population of 4.
