= Sobrecastell =

- Locality
- Location within Aragon Location within Spain
- Coordinates: 42°16′5″N 0°43′10″E
- Country: Spain
- Autonomous community: Aragon
- Province: Province of Huesca
- Municipality: Arén
- Elevation: 685 m (2,247 ft)

Population
  - Total: 27

Sobrecastell is a locality located in the municipality of Arén, in Huesca province, Aragon, Spain. As of 2020, it has a population of 27.

== Geography ==
Sobrecastell is located 133km east of Huesca.
