= Los Molinos (Arén) =

- Locality
- Location within Aragon Location within Spain
- Coordinates: 42°20′50″N 0°42′19″E
- Country: Spain
- Autonomous community: Aragon
- Province: Province of Huesca
- Municipality: Arén
- Elevation: 923 m (3,028 ft)

Population
  - Total: 3

Los Molinos is a locality located in the municipality of Arén, in Huesca province, Aragon, Spain. As of 2020, it has a population of 3.

== Geography ==
Los Molinos is located 143km east-northeast of Huesca.
