= Arén =

Arén Areny de Noguera (Ribagorçan) Arén de Noguera (Aragonese)
- Municipality
- Arén (Spanish)
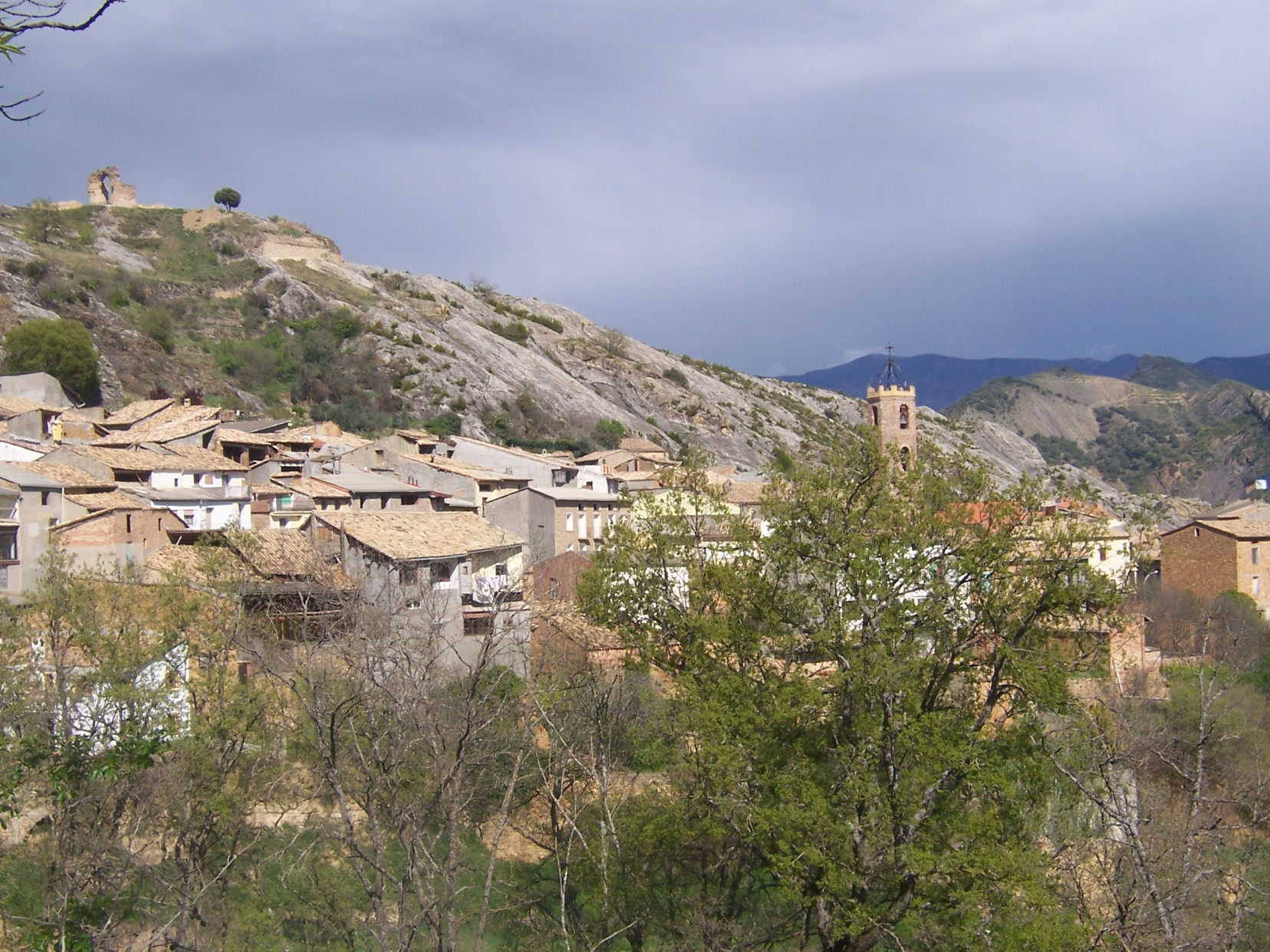

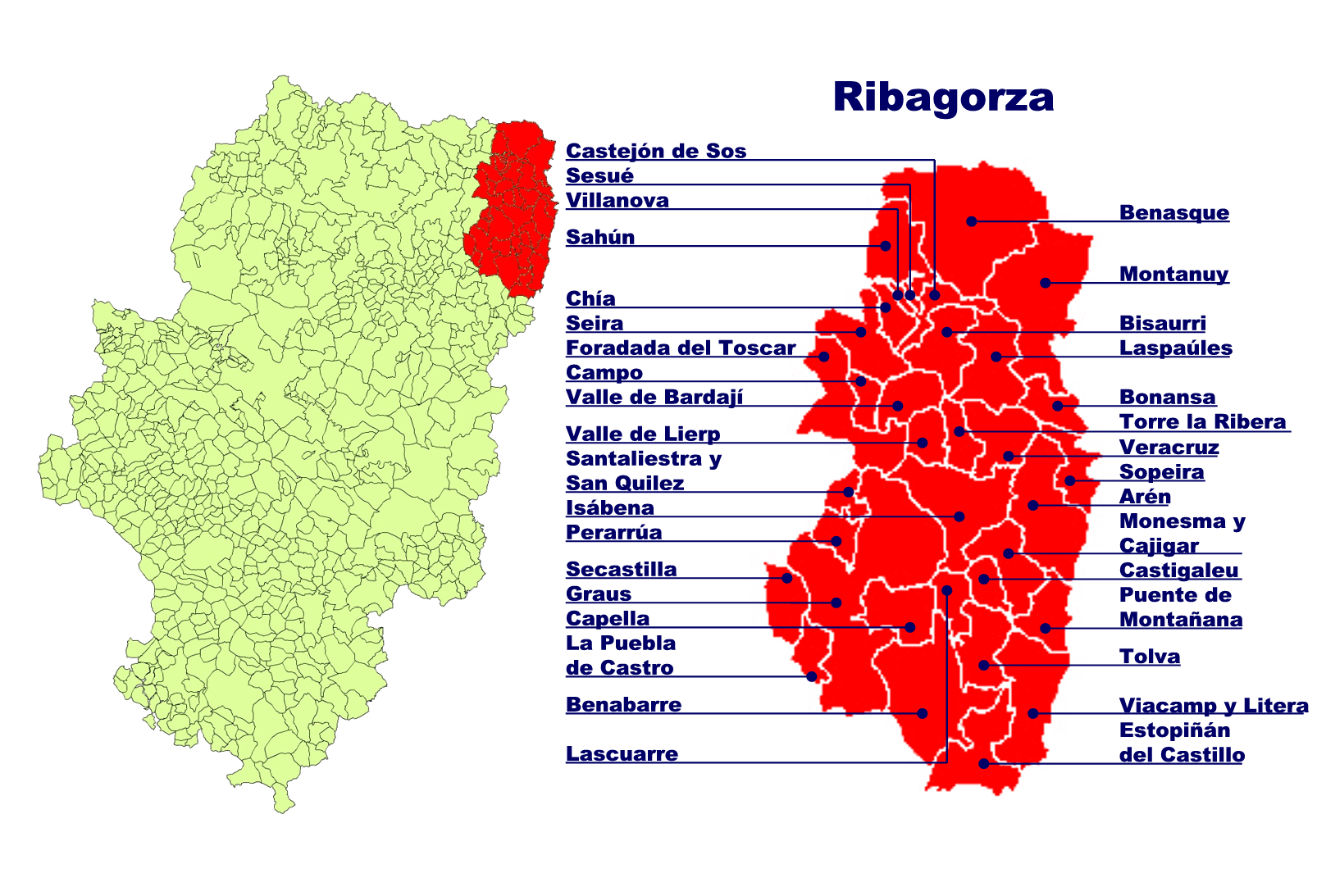

- Location of Arén/Areny de Noguera within Aragon Location of Arén/Areny de Noguera within Spain
- Coordinates: 42°16′N 0°44′E
- Country: Spain
- Autonomous community: Aragón
- Province: Huesca
- Comarca: Ribagorza
- Judicial district: Barbastro

Government
  - Alcalde: Maria Asunción Codina Marcet (PSOE)

Area
  - Total: 119 km^{2} (46 sq mi)
- Elevation: 709 m (2,326 ft)

Population (2025-01-01)
  - Total: 309
  - Density: 2.60/km^{2} (6.73/sq mi)
- Demonym: Arenense
- Time zone: UTC+1 (CET)
  - Summer (DST): UTC+2 (CEST)
- Postal code: 22583
- Website: Official website

Arén (Spanish: [aˈɾen]), in Catalan: Areny de Noguera (Catalan: [aˈɾeɲ de noˈɣeɾɛ]), or in Aragonese: Arén de Noguera, is a municipality located in the province of Huesca, Aragon, Spain. According to the 2018 census (INE), the municipality has a population of 318 inhabitants.

== Villages ==
These include uninhabited villages:

- Former Arén municipality: Arén, Campamento de Arén, Sobrecastell, Berganuy, Claraválls, Puifel and Soliva.
- Former Cornudella de Baliera municipality (merged in 1965): Rivera de Vall, San Martín, El Sas, Casa Consistorial, Puimolar, L'Hostalet, Vilaplana, Soperún, Iscles, Suerri and Tresserra.
- Former Betesa municipality (merged in 1966): Betesa, Santa Eulalia, Los Molinos and Obís.

== Trivia ==
The fossil genera Arenysuchus (a crocodylomorph) and Arenysaurus (a hadrosaurid dinosaur) were named after the municipality.

== See also ==
- Mountains of Sis
- Arenysuchus
- Arenysaurus
- List of municipalities in Huesca
