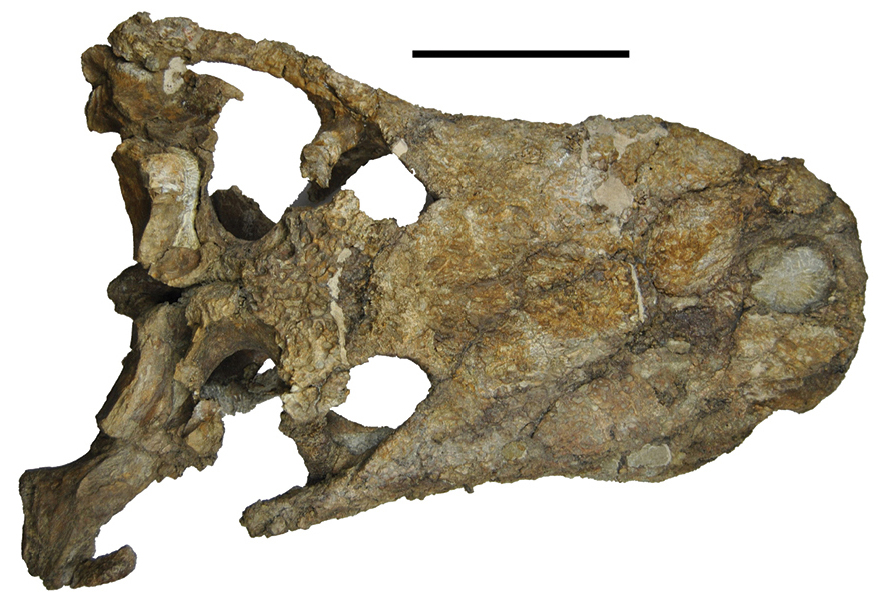
- Holotype skull of A. subjuniperus
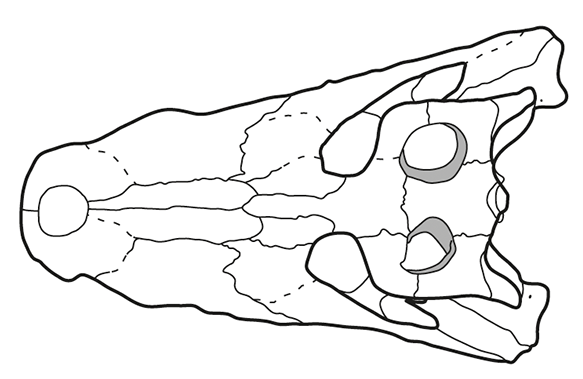
- Skull of A. fontisensis

Scientific classification
- Kingdom: Animalia
- Phylum: Chordata
- Class: Reptilia
- Clade: Archosauria
- Clade: Pseudosuchia
- Clade: Crocodylomorpha
- Clade: Neosuchia
- Clade: Eusuchia
- Clade: †Allodaposuchidae
- Genus: †Agaresuchus; Narváez et al., 2016

Type species
- †Agaresuchus fontisensis Narváez et al., 2016

Species
- †A. fontisensis Narváez et al., 2016 (type; †Agaresuchus subjuniperus (Puértolas et al., 2013)

= Agaresuchus =

Agaresuchus Temporal range: Late Cretaceous, Campanian–Maastrichtian

Extinct genus of reptiles

Agaresuchus is an extinct genus of allodaposuchid eusuchian crocodylomorph from the Late Cretaceous (Campanian-Maastrichtian) of Spain. It includes two species, the type species A. fontisensis, and A. subjuniperus, which was originally named as a species of the related genus Allodaposuchus. However, it has been proposed that both species may instead belong to the genus Allodaposuchus.

== Discovery and naming ==
The genus Agaresuchus was named in 2016 upon the discovery of Agaresuchus fontisensis. Allodaposuchus subjuniperus, discovered in 2013 and originally classified as a new and second species of Allodaposuchus, was then reassigned to Agaresuchus. It is based on the holotype skull, specimen MPZ 2012/288.

A. subjuniperus was named in 2013 on the basis of a skull from the late Maastrichtian-aged Conquès Formation, part of the Tremp Group, in the province of Huesca, Spain. The skull was found underneath a juniper tree whose roots had grown between the bones, hence the specific name subjuniperus or "under juniper" in Latin.

In 2016, the new genus and species Agaresuchus fontisensis was discovered and described. The genus name refers to the demon Agares, depicted by Johann Weyer as an old man riding a crocodile. The specific name was named from the Lo Hueco fossil site in Fuentes, Cuenca, Spain; fontes is the Latin name of Fuentes.

== Description ==
The two species differ in traits such as the shape of the snout (elongated in the former, short in the latter); the shape of the premaxilla (longer than wide compared to wider than long); the number of maxillary tooth sockets (15 compared to 14); the shape of the eye sockets (large and round compared to short and crescent-shaped); the width between the eyes (narrow compared to characteristically broad); and characteristics of the palate and nasal bones.

== Classifiation ==
Agaresuchus was considered to be sufficiently distinct from the eastern European Allodaposuchus precedens to warrant a new genus.

Alternatively, a 2021 phylogenetic analysis considering additional postcranial material recovered Allodaposuchus as paraphyletic with respect to Agaresuchus and Lohuecosuchus, and suggested that both A. fontisensis and A. subjuniperus belong within the genus Allodaposuchus proper, which would render Agaresuchus as a junior synonym of Allodaposuchus. The cladogram from Blanco's 2021 study is shown below:

- Allodaposuchidae
  - Arenysuchus gascabadiolorum
  - - - Allodaposuchus precedens
      - Allodaposuchus iberoarmoricanus
    - - Allodaposuchus subjuniperus
      - - - Allodaposuchus palustris
          - Allodaposuchus hulki
        - - Agaresuchus fontisensis
          - - Lohuecosuchus mechinorum
            - Lohuecosuchus megadontos
