= Puimolar =

- Locality
- Location within Aragon Location within Spain
- Coordinates: 42°18′6″N 0°39′27″E
- Country: Spain
- Autonomous community: Aragon
- Province: Province of Huesca
- Municipality: Arén
- Elevation: 973 m (3,192 ft)

Population
  - Total: 2

Puimolar is a locality located in the municipality of Arén, in Huesca province, Aragon, Spain. As of 2020, it has a population of 2.

== Geography ==
Puimolar is located 142km east-northeast of Huesca.
