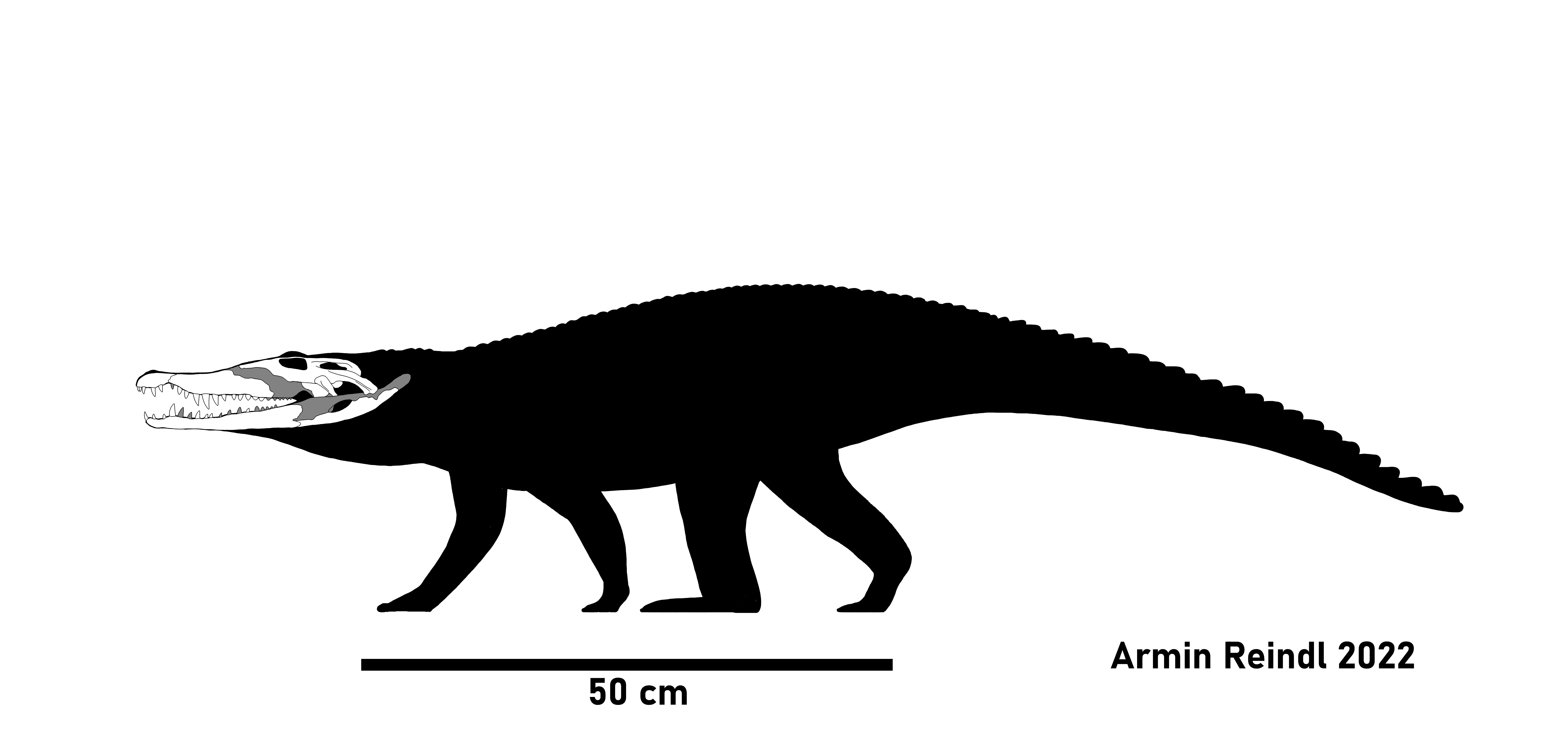
- Skeletal diagram showing known skull remains in white

Scientific classification
- Kingdom: Animalia
- Phylum: Chordata
- Class: Reptilia
- Clade: Archosauria
- Clade: Pseudosuchia
- Clade: Crocodylomorpha
- Clade: Eusuchia
- Family: †Planocraniidae
- Genus: †Duerosuchus; Santiago and Andrés, 2009

Type species
- †Duerosuchus piscator Santiago and Andrés, 2009

= Duerosuchus =

Duerosuchus Temporal range: Middle Eocene, 40 Ma

Extinct genus of reptiles

Duerosuchus is an extinct genus of crocodilian. Remains have been found from Corrales del Vino in Zamora, Spain, and are middle Eocene in age (about 40 million years ago). Duerosuchus is known from a single skull that is incomplete but otherwise well preserved, as well as a lower jaw, some osteoderms, and possibly some vertebrae. Duerosuchus is a basal crocodilian thought to be closely related to brevirostrine (or short-snouted) crocodilians, such as alligatoroids. However, the genus was not initially included in a phylogenetic study and its position within Crocodilia was uncertain, until a 2021 study recovered Duerosuchus within the family Planocraniidae.

== Discovery ==
Remains of Duerosuchus were unearthed by an excavation team from the University of Salamanca. The remains were discovered by Luis Alonso Andrés and his son Luis Alonso Santiago, two amateur paleontologists. The genus was first described by Andrés and Santiago in 2009 and was named after the Duero River, as it was found in the Duero River Basin. The type species is D. piscator, named in reference to its presumed ability to catch fish, inferred from the shape of its teeth.

== Description ==
The skull of Duerosuchus is around 20 centimetres (7.9 in) long. The length of the entire animal is estimated to have been around 1.6 metres (5.2 ft). This estimation is based on the size of the body relative to the skull in similar crocodilians where the body length is known. The holotype skull, known as STUS 14.133, is missing some bones such as those surrounding the infratemporal fenestra on the backside of the skull and the nasal bone along the midline of the snout. Despite the lack of some material, the shape of the skull can be inferred from existing bones. The teeth are sharp and recurved with narrow bases. There is a notch in the premaxilla to accommodate the fourth mandibular tooth of the lower jaw.

== Paleobiology ==
In addition to Duerosuchus, three other Eocene crocodyliforms are known from Corrales: the sebecian Iberosuchus and the crocodilians Asiatosuchus and Diplocynodon. Asiatosuchus, a large crocodylid, probably had a similar lifestyle to Duerosuchus. Asiatosuchus, like other large crocodilians, had robust back teeth that were suitable for crushing. It may have preyed on turtles such as Allaeochelys that were present in the area. While Duerosuchus may also have preyed on turtles, it was better adapted to catching smaller prey such as fish. Fish are abundant in the sediments from which Duerosuchus has been found. The University of Salamanca has a collection of Eocene fossils from the area that includes remains of Duerosuchus, Asiatosuchus, Iberosuchus, and many fish and turtle fossils, some of which have bite marks thought to have been made by crocodilians.
