= El Sas =

- Locality
- Location within Aragon Location within Spain
- Coordinates: 42°18′30″N 0°39′46″E
- Country: Spain
- Autonomous community: Aragon
- Province: Province of Huesca
- Municipality: Arén
- Elevation: 1,003 m (3,291 ft)

Population
  - Total: 17

El Sas is a locality located in the municipality of Arén, in Huesca province, Aragon, Spain. As of 2020, it has a population of 17.

== Geography ==
El Sas is located 141km east-northeast of Huesca.
