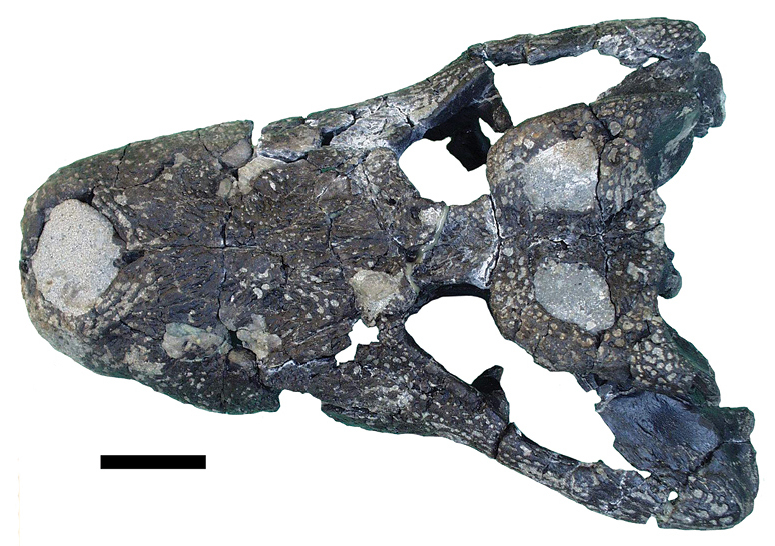
- A. precedens skull

Scientific classification
- Kingdom: Animalia
- Phylum: Chordata
- Class: Reptilia
- Clade: Archosauria
- Clade: Pseudosuchia
- Clade: Crocodylomorpha
- Clade: Neosuchia
- Clade: Eusuchia
- Clade: †Allodaposuchidae; Narváez et al., 2015

Type species
- †Allodaposuchus precedens Nopcsa, 1928

Genera
- †Agaresuchus; †Allodaposuchus; †Arenysuchus; †Ischyrochampsa; †Lohuecosuchus; †Massaliasuchus; †Musturzabalsuchus; †Portugalosuchus?

= Allodaposuchidae =

Allodaposuchidae Temporal range: Late Cretaceous: Santonian-Maastrichtian, 86.3–66 Ma

Extinct clade of reptiles

Allodaposuchidae is an extinct clade of eusuchians that lived in Europe during the Late Cretaceous (Santonian-Maastrichtian).

== Systematics ==
The type genus, Allodaposuchus, was originally described in 1928 by Nopcsa from the Maastrichtian-age Sard Formation of the Hațeg Basin in Transylvania, Romania, and classified as a relative of the North American Leidyosuchus. It was later classified as a eusuchian outside of Crocodylia in a 2001 paper, and subsequent studies found a number of European eusuchian species (Arenysuchus, Ischyrochampsa, Massaliasuchus, Musturzabalsuchus) to group with Allodaposuchus, prompting the erection of the clade Allodaposuchidae to accommodate Allodaposuchus and all European eusuchians closely related to it. Narváez et al. cladistically defined Allodaposuchidae in 2015 as Allodaposuchus precedens and all crocodyliforms more closely related to it than to Hylaeochampsa vectiana, Shamosuchus djadochtaensis, Borealosuchus sternbergii, Planocrania datangensis, Alligator mississippiensis, Crocodylus niloticus, or Gavialis gangeticus.

The exact placement of Allodaposuchidae is still in dispute. Narváez et al. considered it the sister group to Hylaeochampsidae, which together form a clade that is sister to Crocodylia. Other studies have alternatively recovered them not as sister taxon, but rather as an evolutionary grade towards Crocodylia, with Hylaeochampsidae more basal than Allodaposuchidae. Alternatively, a 2021 analysis incorporating postcranial information recovered Allodaposuchidae within Crocodylia.

Cladogram 1: Narváez et al., 2015

- Eusuchia
  - - Hylaeochampsidae†
    - Allodaposuchidae†
  - Crocodylia

Cladogram 2: Rio & Mannion, 2021

- Eusuchia
  - Hylaeochampsidae†
  - - Allodaposuchidae†
    - Crocodylia

Cladogram 3: Blanco, 2021

- Eusuchia
  - Hylaeochampsidae†
  - Crocodylia
    - Gavialoidea
    - - Allodaposuchidae†
      - Brevirostres

The internal phylogeny of Allodaposuchidae can be shown in the cladogram below from the 2021 Blanco study:

- Allodaposuchidae
  - Arenysuchus gascabadiolorum
  - - - Allodaposuchus precedens
      - Allodaposuchus iberoarmoricanus
    - - Allodaposuchus subjuniperus
      - - - Allodaposuchus palustris
          - Allodaposuchus hulki
        - - Agaresuchus fontisensis
          - - Lohuecosuchus mechinorum
            - Lohuecosuchus megadontos

In the 2021 study, Blanco recovered Allodaposuchus as paraphyletic, with Agaresuchus and Lohuecosuchus. Accordingly, Blanco proposed that Agaresuchus and Lohuecosuchus should be considered junior synonyms of Allodaposuchus.

== Palaeobiology ==
=== Palaeoecology ===
Allodaposuchids were semi-aquatic carnivores, occupying a range of habitats from freshwater to brackish environments.
