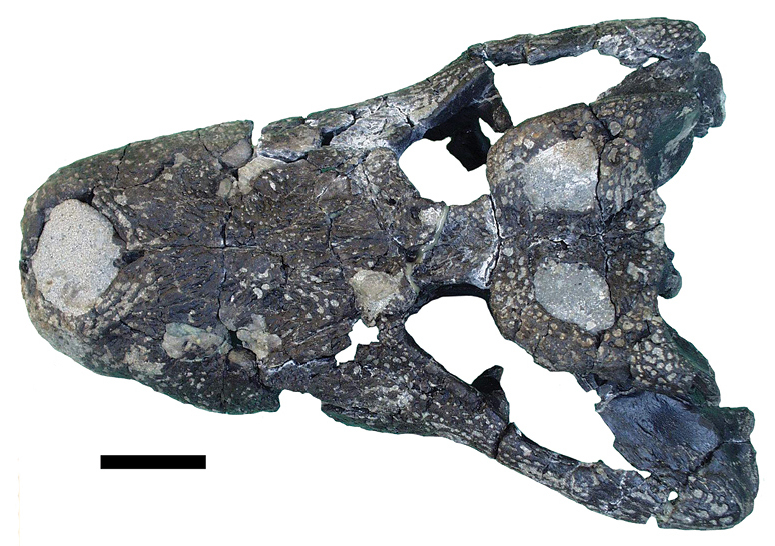
- A. precedens neotype skull

Scientific classification
- Kingdom: Animalia
- Phylum: Chordata
- Class: Reptilia
- Clade: Pseudosuchia
- Clade: Crocodylomorpha
- Clade: Eusuchia
- Clade: †Allodaposuchidae
- Genus: †Allodaposuchus; Nopcsa, 1928

Type species
- †Allodaposuchus precedens Nopcsa, 1928

Species
- †A. precedens Nopcsa, 1928; †A. subjuniperus? Puértolas et al., 2013 (also Agaresuchus); †A. palustris Blanco et al., 2014; †A. hulki Blanco et al., 2015; †A. iberoarmoricanus Blanco, 2021; †A. fontisensis? (Narváez et al., 2016; originally Agaresuchus); †A. megadontos? (Narváez et al. 2015; originally Lohuecosuchus); †A. mechinorum? (Narváez et al. 2015; originally Lohuecosuchus)

Synonyms
- Agaresuchus? Narváez et al., 2016; Lohuecosuchus? Narváez et al. 2015

= Allodaposuchus =

Allodaposuchus Temporal range: Campanian–Maastrichtian Possible Santonian record

Extinct genus of reptiles

Allodaposuchus is an extinct genus of crocodyliforms that lived in what is now southern Europe during the Campanian and Maastrichtian stages, and possibly the Santonian stage, of the Late Cretaceous. Although generally classified as a non-crocodylian eusuchian crocodylomorph, it is sometimes placed as one of the earliest true crocodylians. Allodaposuchus is one of the most common Late Cretaceous crocodylomorphs from Europe, with fossils known from Romania, Spain, and France.

== Description ==
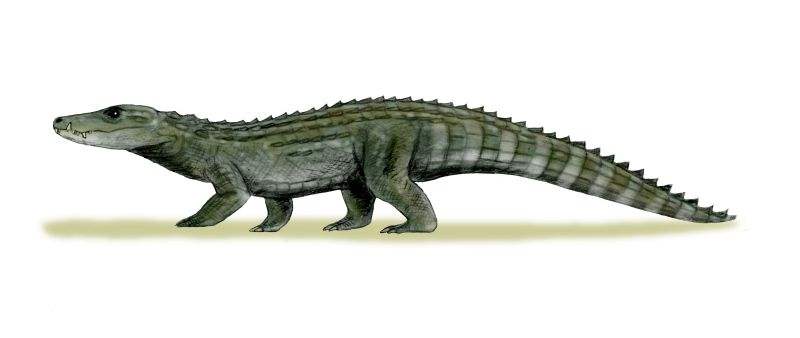
Restoration of A. precedens

Like many other Cretaceous crocodylomorphs, Allodaposuchus has a relatively small body size compared to living crocodylians. The largest known specimen of Allodaposuchus belongs to an individual that was probably around 3 metres (9.8 ft) long. Although the shape varies between species, in general Allodaposuchus has a short, flattened, and rounded skull. Allodaposuchus precedens has a brevirostrine or "short-snouted" skull with a snout about the same length as the skull table (the region of the skull behind the eye sockets) and A. subjuniperus has a mesorostrine or "middle-snouted" skull with a snout that is longer than the skull table. The main feature that distinguishes Allodaposuchus species from other related crocodylomorphs is the orientation of a groove at the back of the skull called the cranioquadrate passage; unlike the cranioquadrate passages of other crocodylomorphs, which are only visible at the back of the skull, the cranioquadrate passage of Allodaposuchus is visible when the skull is viewed from the side.

Allodaposuchus reconstruction in its palaeoenvironment based on Della Giustina et al. (2025)

At least one species of Allodaposuchus, A. hulki, may have adaptations that would have allowed it to live on land for extended periods of time. A. hulki has large sinuses in its skull that are not seen in any other crocodylian living or extinct and may have aided it in hearing out of water, as well as lightening the skull. Moreover, A. hulki has well-developed muscle attachments on its scapula, humerus, and ulna bones that would have allowed the forelimbs to have been held in a semi-erect stance suitable for walking over land. Remains of A. hulki come from interbedded sandstones and marls that, based on the presence of charophyte algae, likely formed in ephemeral ponds in a large floodplain far from permanent bodies of water like lakes or rivers. A. hulki may therefore have spent much of its time out of water, travelling between these ponds for food.

== History of study ==
While there are several described species of Allodaposuchus, the precise membership of the group is currently disputed.

=== Allodaposuchus precedens ===
The type species of Allodaposuchus, A. precedens, was named by Hungarian paleontologist Franz Nopcsa in 1928 from Vălioara, Romania. Nopcsa found bone fragments in a deposit of the Hațeg Basin that dates back to the late Maastrichtian stage – the very end of the Late Cretaceous. Several partial skulls from Spain and France were attributed to A. precedens in 2001. Some of these skulls came from Campanian-age deposits slightly older than those in Romania, meaning that the species must have persisted for about 5 million years.

A 2013 study proposed that the French and Spanish fossils assigned to A. precedens in 2001 might actually represent a new unnamed species of Allodaposuchus currently identified as Allodaposuchus sp. A study published in 2005 had suggested that these fossils belong to several different genera of crocodylomorphs and that the original Romanian material is too fragmentary to assign to its own genus, making Allodaposuchus a nomen dubium or "dubious name". However, the 2013 study reaffirmed the Romanian material's distinctiveness from other European Cretaceous crocodylomorphs and therefore reaffirmed the validity of Allodaposuchus as a genus. A petition to designate the specimen PSMUBB V 438 as the neotype to replace the original non-diagnostic type specimen was submitted to the International Commission on Zoological Nomenclature (ICZN) in 2017, which was approved in 2020.

=== Allodaposuchus (Agaresuchus) subjuniperus ? ===
In 2013, a second species of Allodaposuchus, A. subjuniperus, was named on the basis of a skull from the late-Maastrichtian Conquès Formation, part of the Tremp Group, in the province of Huesca, Spain. The skull was found underneath a juniper tree whose roots had grown between the bones, hence the species name subjuniperus or "under juniper" in Latin. However, in 2016, A. subjuniperus was moved to a new genus, Agaresuchus along with the type species of that genus, A. fontisensis, on the grounds that the Spanish species were sufficiently distinct from A. precedens. In 2021, a phylogenetic analysis by Blanco disputed this result, suggesting that both A. fontisensis and A. subjuniperus belong within the genus Allodaposuchus proper, alongside the two species of Lohuecosuchus: L. megadontos and L. mechinorum.

=== Allodaposuchus palustris ===
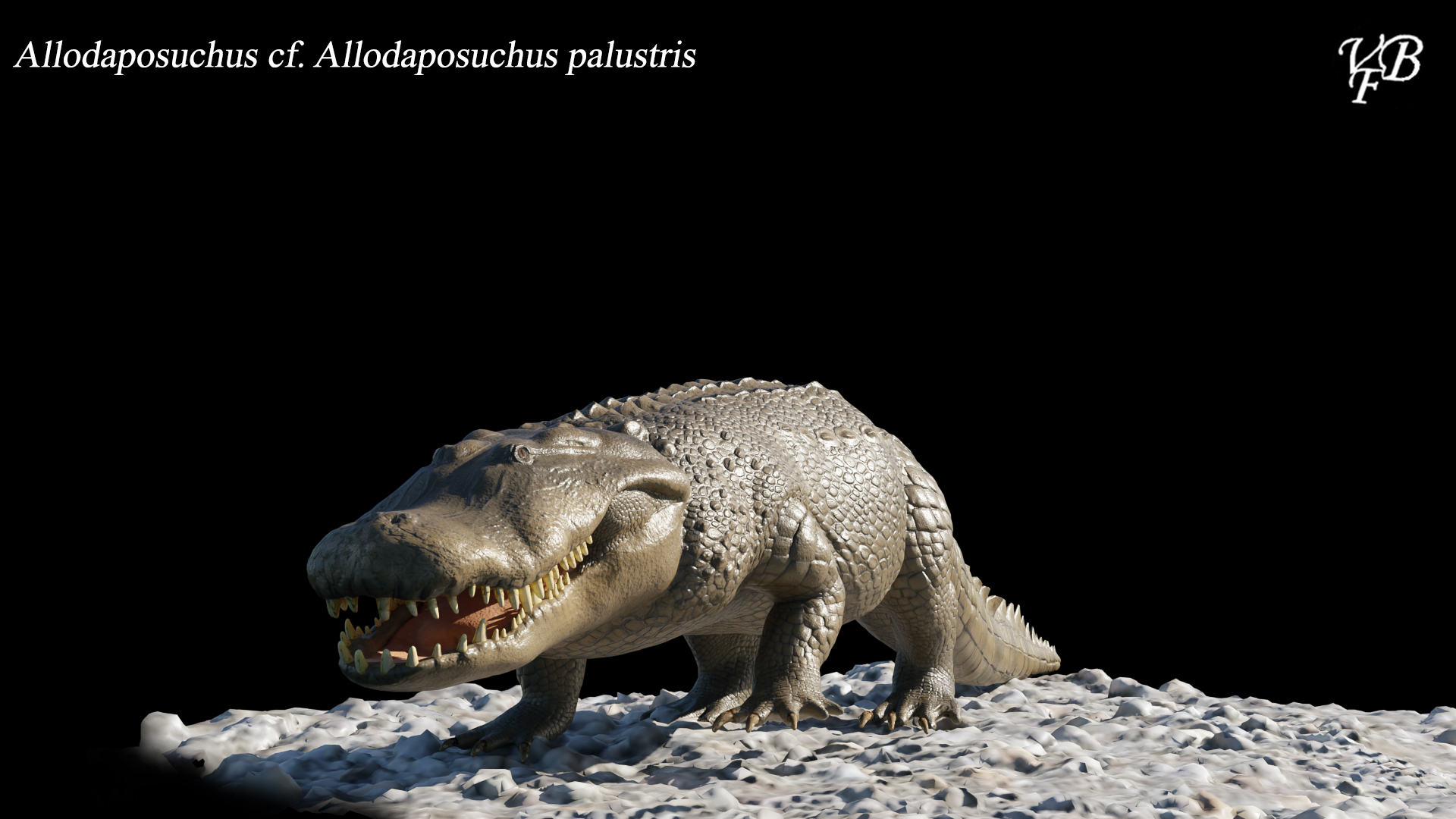
Reconstruction of the life appearance of Allodaposuchus based ont the new data of its postcranial skeleton by Della Giustina et al. (2025)

In 2014, A. palustris was described from a partial skull and other skeletal fragments found in Maastrichtian age sediments of the Tremp Formation in a fossil locality called Fumanya Sud in the southern Pyrenees. These remains allowed for the first detailed description of the postcranial (non-skull) anatomy of Allodaposuchus.

=== Allodaposuchus hulki ===
A fourth species of Allodaposuchus, A. hulki, was named in 2015 and also came from the Tremp Formation, although this time in a locality called Casa Fabà. The species is named after the Hulk from Marvel Comics, in reference to features on the bones that suggest it had strong muscles.

=== Allodaposuchus iberoarmoricanus ===
A. palustris was described by Blanco in 2021 based on fossils discovered in Late Campanian-aged fluvial deposits in Velaux-La Bastide Neuve, in Bouches-du-Rhône Department of southern France. The species name is in reference to the Ibero-Armorican island of the Cretaceous European Archipelago.

=== Allodaposuchus (Agaresuchus) fontisensis ? ===
In 2016, the new genus and species Agaresuchus fontisensis was discovered and described. It was named from the Lo Hueco fossil site in Fuentes, Cuenca, Spain; fontis is the Latin name of Fuentes. A. subjuniperus was then also placed into the new genus Agaresuchus. However, Blanco's 2021 study has called this into question, and instead proposed that they should both be considered members of Allodaposuchus, with Agaresuchus as a junior synonym.

=== Allodaposuchus (Lohuecosuchus) megadontos and Allodaposuchus (Lohuecosuchus) mechinorum ? ===
The genus Lohuecosuchus was named in 2015 and contained two species, L. megadontos and L. mechinorum, from Spain and southern France. However, Blanco's 2021 study has called this into question, and instead proposed that they should both be considered members of Allodaposuchus, with Lohuecosuchus as a junior synonym.

== Classification ==
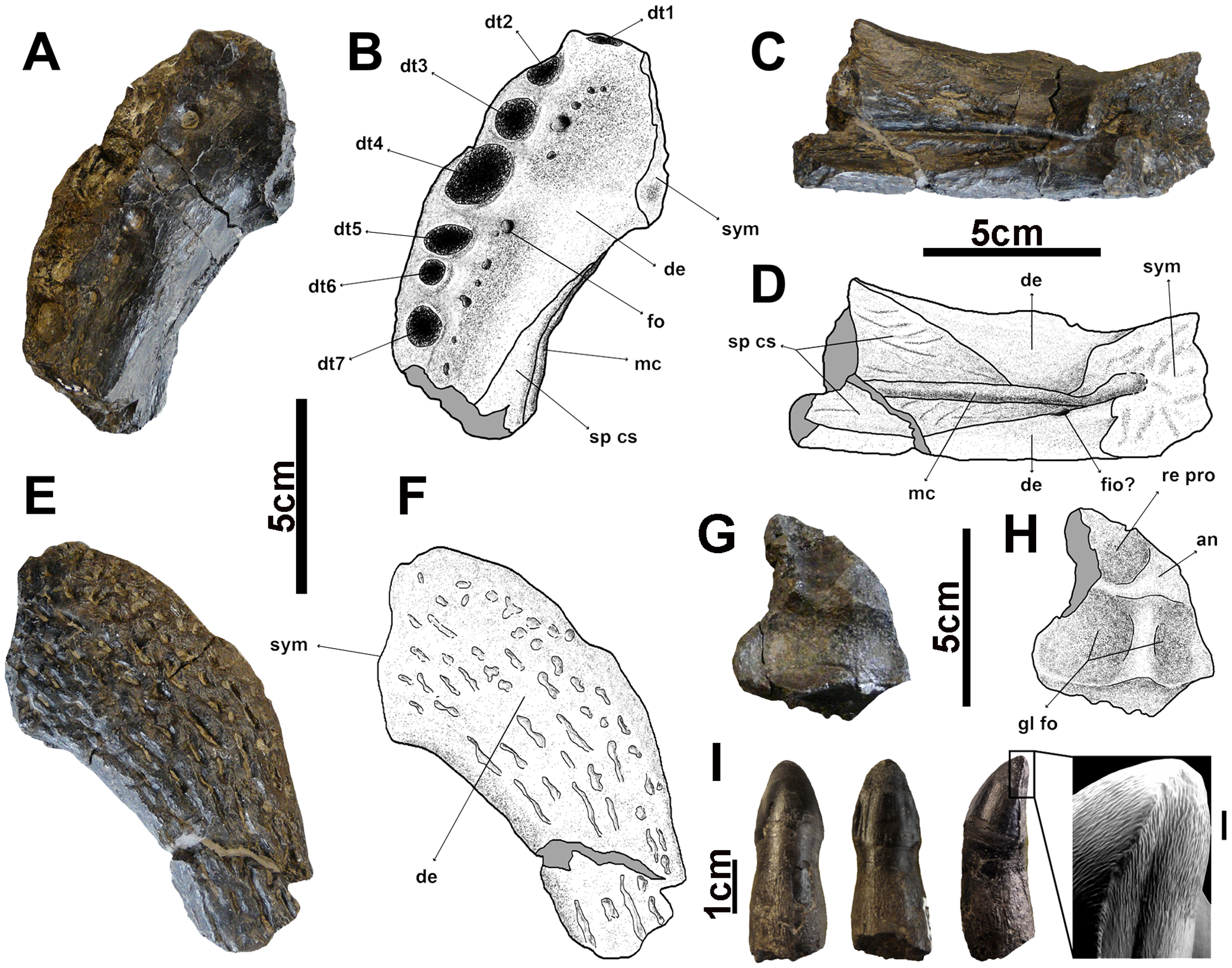
jaw fragments and teeth of A. palustris

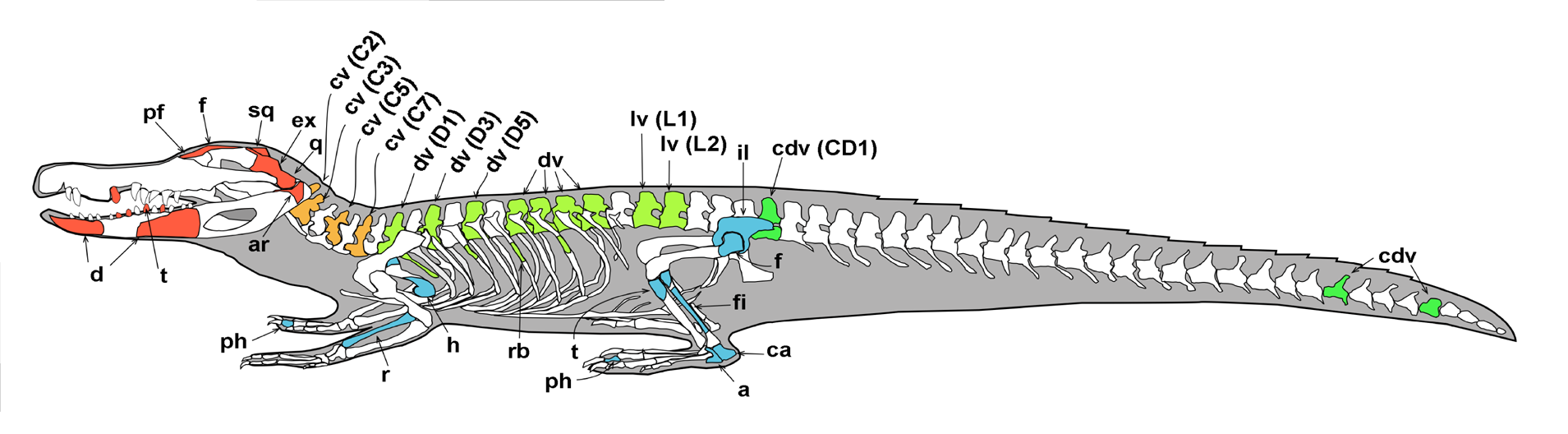
Skeletal diagram showing known remains of A. palustris

Allodaposuchus belongs to the clade Allodaposuchidae. The exact placement of Allodaposuchidae is still in dispute. Narváez et al. considered it the sister group to Hylaeochampsidae, which together form a clade that is sister to Crocodylia. Other studies have alternatively recovered them not as sister taxon, but rather as an evolutionary grade towards Crocodylia, with Hylaeochampsidae more basal than Allodaposuchidae. Alternatively, a 2021 analysis incorporating postcranial information recovered Allodaposuchidae within Crocodylia.

Cladogram 1: Narváez et al., 2015

- Eusuchia
  - - Hylaeochampsidae†
    - Allodaposuchidae†
  - Crocodylia

Cladogram 2: Rio & Mannion, 2021

- Eusuchia
  - Hylaeochampsidae†
  - - Allodaposuchidae†
    - Crocodylia

Cladogram 3: Blanco, 2021

- Eusuchia
  - Hylaeochampsidae†
  - Crocodylia
    - Gavialoidea
    - - Allodaposuchidae†
      - Brevirostres

The internal phylogeny of Allodaposuchidae can be shown in the cladogram below from the 2021 Blanco study:

- Allodaposuchidae
  - Arenysuchus gascabadiolorum
  - - - Allodaposuchus precedens
      - Allodaposuchus iberoarmoricanus
    - - Allodaposuchus subjuniperus
      - - - Allodaposuchus palustris
          - Allodaposuchus hulki
        - - Agaresuchus fontisensis
          - - Lohuecosuchus mechinorum
            - Lohuecosuchus megadontos

In the 2021 study, Blanco recovered Allodaposuchus as paraphyletic, with Agaresuchus and Lohuecosuchus. Accordingly, Blanco proposed that Agaresuchus and Lohuecosuchus should be considered junior synonyms of Allodaposuchus.
