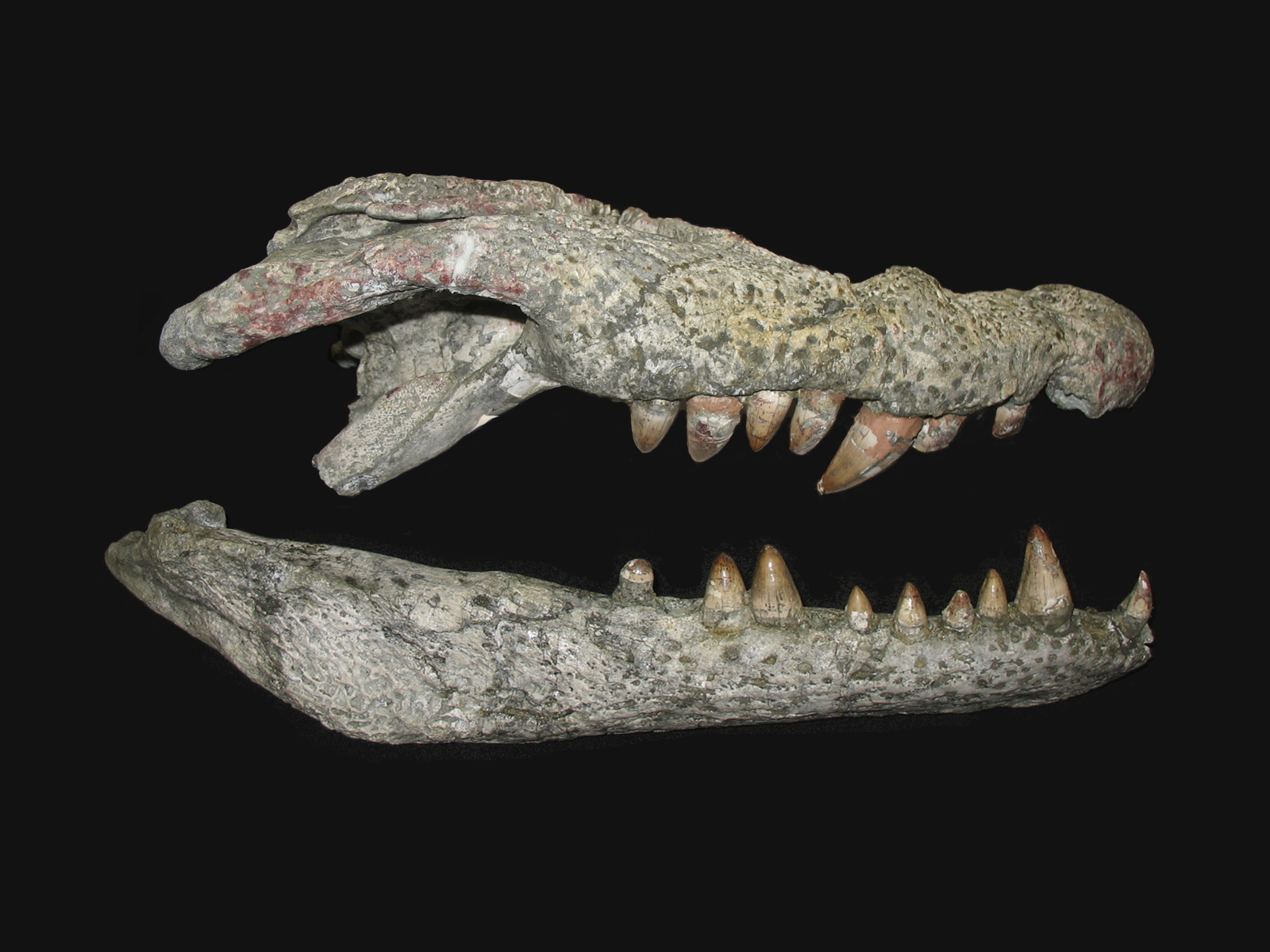
- Skull and mandible of Lohuecosuchus megadontos

Scientific classification
- Kingdom: Animalia
- Phylum: Chordata
- Class: Reptilia
- Clade: Archosauria
- Clade: Pseudosuchia
- Clade: Crocodylomorpha
- Clade: Eusuchia
- Clade: †Allodaposuchidae
- Genus: †Lohuecosuchus; Narváez et al., 2015

Type species
- †Lohuecosuchus megadontos Narváez et al. 2015

Species
- †L. mechinorum Narváez et al. 2015; †L. megadontos Narváez et al. 2015

= Lohuecosuchus =

Lohuecosuchus Temporal range: Late Cretaceous: Campanian–Maastrichtian, 77.9–69 Ma

Extinct genus of reptiles

Lohuecosuchus (meaning "Lo Hueco crocodile") is an extinct genus of allodaposuchid eusuchian crocodylomorph that lived during the Late Cretaceous (late Campanian to early Maastrichtian) in what is now Spain and southern France.

== Description ==
The anatomy of the endocranium (braincase) of L. megadontos was found to be similar to crown-crocodylians, revealing that the acute sense of olfaction and low frequency hearing found in living crocodylians likely originated along the stem-line.

== Classification ==
Lohuecosuchus is a member of the clade Allodaposuchidae, a group of eusuchians that lived in southern Europe during the Late Cretaceous. Two species of Lohuecosuchus were described in 2015. The type species, Lohuecosuchus megadontos, was recovered from the Lo Hueco fossil site of the Villalba de la Sierra Formation in the municipality of Fuentes, Cuenca Province at Castilla-La Mancha of central Spain. The species name megadontos is composed of the Greek words "mega" (meaning big) and "odon" (meaning tooth), in reference to the relatively large size of the teeth. The second species, Lohuecosuchus mechinorum, was found at the Fox-Amphoux fossil site of the Grès à Reptiles Formation in the Department of Var in southeastern France, and was named after the discoverers of the holotype, Patrick and Annie Mechin.

Lohuecosuchus was both synchronic and sympatric (lived at the same time and place) with another allodaposuchid species, Agaresuchus fontisensis. Lohuecosuchus is also closely related to Allodaposuchus, another genus from southern Europe that includes several species.

However, a 2021 phylogenetic analysis considering additional postcranial material recovered Allodaposuchus as paraphyletic with respect to Agaresuchus and Lohuecosuchus, and suggested that both Agaresuchus and Lohuecosuchus belong within the genus Allodaposuchus proper, which would render them as junior synonyms of Allodaposuchus. The cladogram from Blanco's 2021 study is shown below:

- Allodaposuchidae
  - Arenysuchus gascabadiolorum
  - - - Allodaposuchus precedens
      - Allodaposuchus iberoarmoricanus
    - - Allodaposuchus subjuniperus
      - - - Allodaposuchus palustris
          - Allodaposuchus hulki
        - - Agaresuchus fontisensis
          - - Lohuecosuchus mechinorum
            - Lohuecosuchus megadontos
