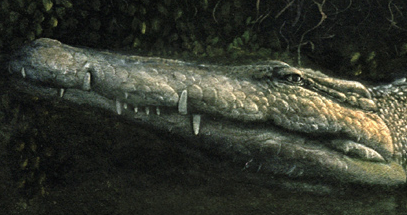
- Life reconstruction of Pristichampsus

Scientific classification
- Kingdom: Animalia
- Phylum: Chordata
- Class: Reptilia
- Clade: Archosauria
- Clade: Pseudosuchia
- Clade: Crocodylomorpha
- Order: Crocodilia
- Family: †Pristichampsidae
- Genus: †Pristichampsus; Gervais, 1853

Type species
- †Pristichampsus rollinatii (Gray, 1831)

Species
- †P. birjukovi? Efimov, 1988; †P. kuznetzovi? Efimov, 1988

Synonyms
- Crocodylus rollinatii Gray, 1831; Limnosaurus ziphodon? (Marsh, 1871)

= Pristichampsus =

Pristichampsus Temporal range: Eocene, 47.8–41.2 Ma Lutetian

Extinct genus of reptiles

Pristichampsus (from Greek: πρῐ́στῐς prístis, 'saw' and Greek: χαμψαι champsai, 'crocodile') is a non-diagnostic and potentially dubious extinct genus of crocodylian from France and possibly also Kazakhstan that is part of the monotypic Pristichampsidae family. As the type species, Pristichampsus rollinatii, was based on insufficient material when described in 1831 and 1853, the taxonomic status of the genus is in doubt, and other species have been referred to other genera, primarily Boverisuchus.

== History ==
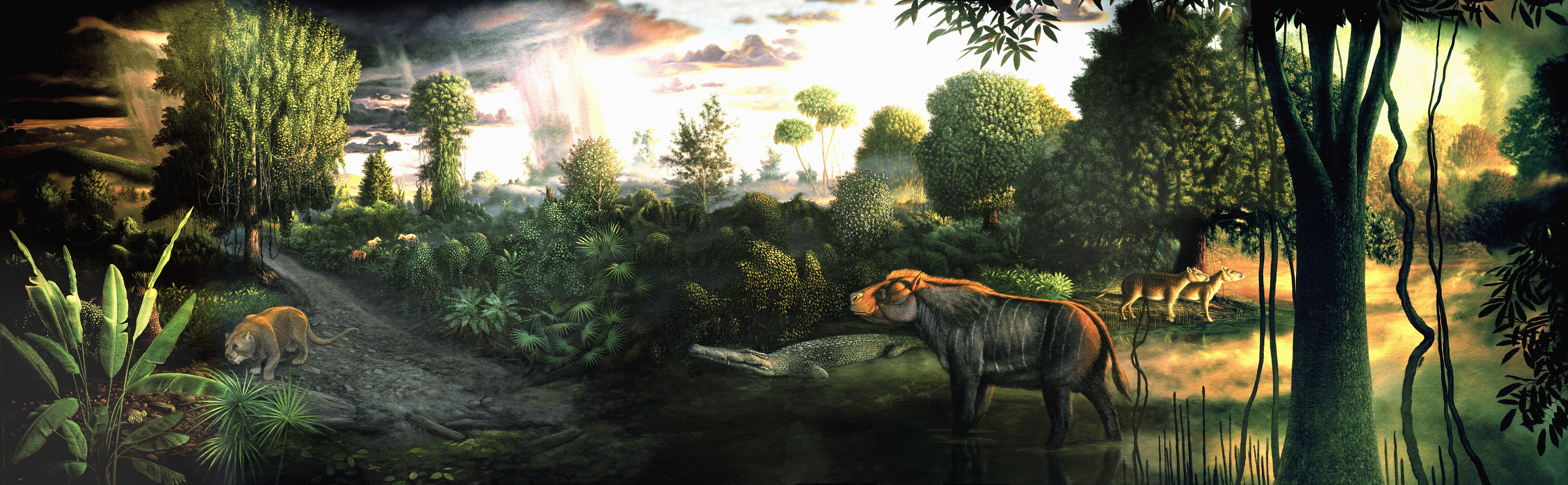
Restoration of Pristichampsus (middle) and other animals of the Eocene Clarno Formation (Clarno Nut Beds)

Pristichampsus was first described and named as a species of Crocodylus, C. rollinatii, by John Edward Gray in 1831 on the basis of remains from the Lutetian Sables du Castrais Formation of France. Paul Gervais (1853) assigned this species to its own genus, creating the new combination Pristichampsus rollinatii.

Other species have been referred to this genus. The genera Boverisuchus and Weigeltisuchus from the Lutetian of Germany as well as Limnosaurus from North America were synonymized with Pristichampsus and their type species were reassigned to it. Langston (1975) found Limnosaurus to be based on non-diagnostic remains, and therefore considered it to be in its own genus, as a nomen dubium. He also reassigned Crocodylus vorax from the Lutetian of Wyoming and West Texas to Pristichampsus.

Efimov (1988) named two additional species of Pristichampsus, P. birjukovi and P. kuznetzovi from the Middle Eocene of Eastern Kazakhstan.

Following a revision of the genus Pristichampsus by Brochu (2013), P. rollinatii was found to be based on insufficiently diagnostic material and therefore is a nomen dubium. Boverisuchus was reinstated as a valid genus, and the species Weigeltisuchus geiseltalensis was considered to be synonymous with B. magnifrons. Brochu (2013) also reassigned P. vorax as the second species of Boverisuchus. According to Brochu (2013), material from the middle Eocene of Italy and Texas may represent other species of Boverisuchus.
