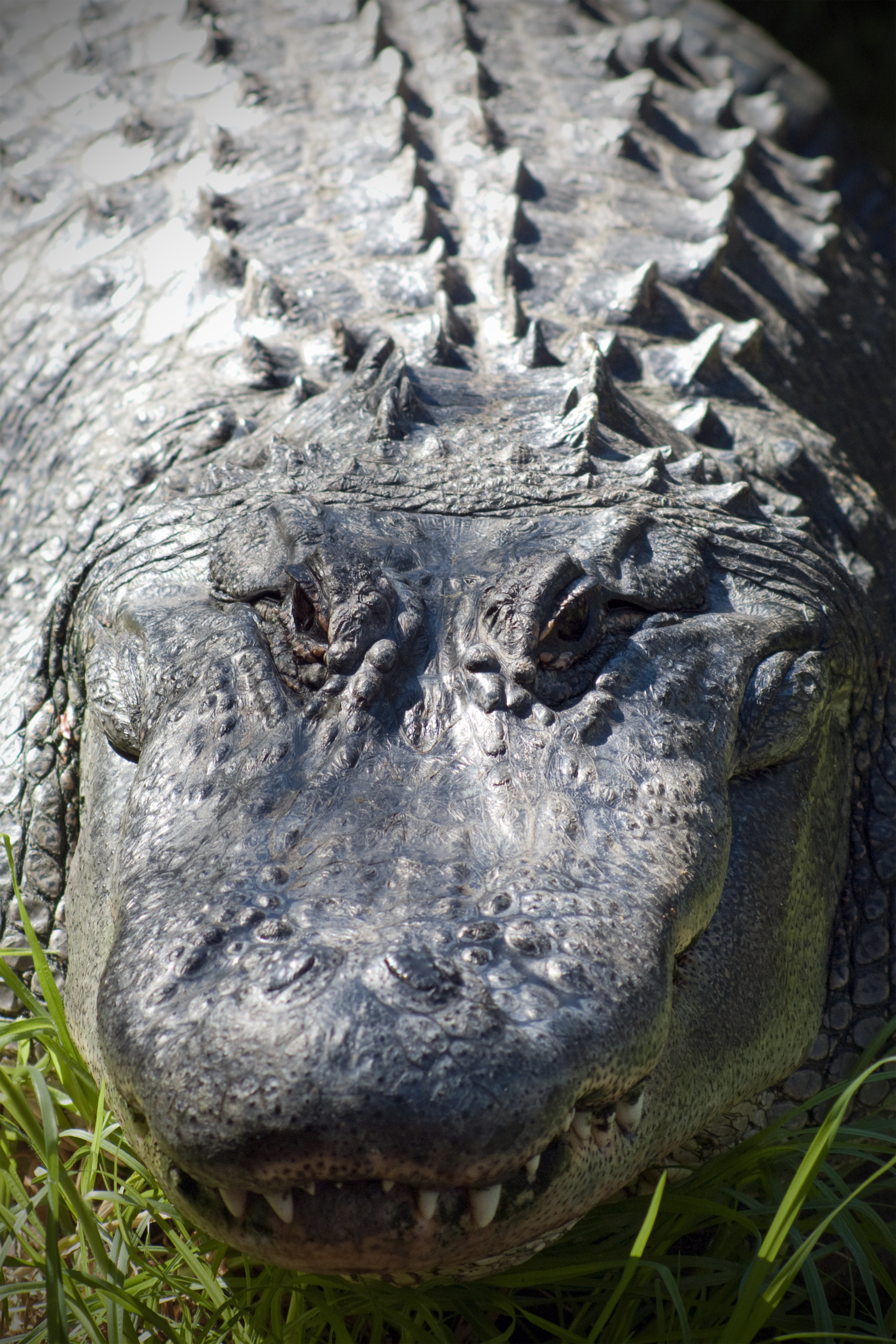
- American alligator (Alligator mississippiensis)

Scientific classification (obsolete as paraphyletic)
- Kingdom: Animalia
- Phylum: Chordata
- Class: Reptilia
- Clade: Archosauria
- Order: Crocodilia
- (unranked): Brevirostres von Zittel, 1890

Groups included
- Alligatoroidea; Crocodyloidea

Cladistically included but traditionally excluded taxa
- Gavialoidea; †Asiatosuchus; †Brachyuranochampsa; †"Crocodylus" acer; †"Crocodylus" affinis; †Pristichampsus; †Prodiplocynodon; †Mekosuchinae; †Planocraniidae?

= Brevirostres =

Brevirostres Temporal range: Late Cretaceous - Recent, 83.5–0 Ma

Obsolete taxon of reptiles

Brevirostres is an obsolete group of crocodilians that, as originally formulated, included alligatoroids and crocodyloids, but not gavialoids. Results of molecular phylogenetic analysis uniformly draw gavialoids and crocodyloids into a close relationship; in that case, Brevirostres becomes obsolete with Crocodilia.

Members of brevirostres are crocodilians with small snouts, and are distinguished from the long-snouted gharials. It is defined phylogenetically as the last common ancestor of Alligator mississippiensis (the American alligator) and Crocodylus niloticus (the Nile crocodile) and all of its descendants. This classification was based on morphological studies primarily focused on analyzing skeletal traits of living and extinct fossil species, and placed the gharials outside the group due to their unique skull structure, and can be shown in the simplified cladogram below:

- Crocodylia
  - Gavialoidea
  - Brevirostres
    - Alligatoroidea
    - Crocodyloidea

However, recent molecular studies using DNA sequencing render Brevirostres redundant with Crocodylia upon finding the crocodiles and gavialids to be more closely related than the alligators. The new clade Longirostres was defined by Harshman et al. in 2003, and can be shown in the cladogram below:

- Crocodylia
  - Alligatoroidea
  - Longirostres
    - Gavialoidea
    - Crocodyloidea

== History ==
Brevirostres was first named by Karl Alfred von Zittel in 1890. Von Zittel considered Gavialis, the gharial, to be closely related to Tomistoma, the false gharial, and excluded them from the group. Tomistoma, as its name implies, is traditionally not considered closely related to Gavialis, but instead classified as a crocodylid. Under this classification, all members of Brevirostres are brevirostrine, or short-snouted. Recent molecular analyses support von Zittel's classification in placing Tomistoma as a close relative of Gavialis. If this classification is accepted, Brevirostres can be considered redundant with Crocodylia, as the two names would refer the same clade. Brevirostres would not, however, be a junior synonym of Crocodylia, as the two names have different definitions.
