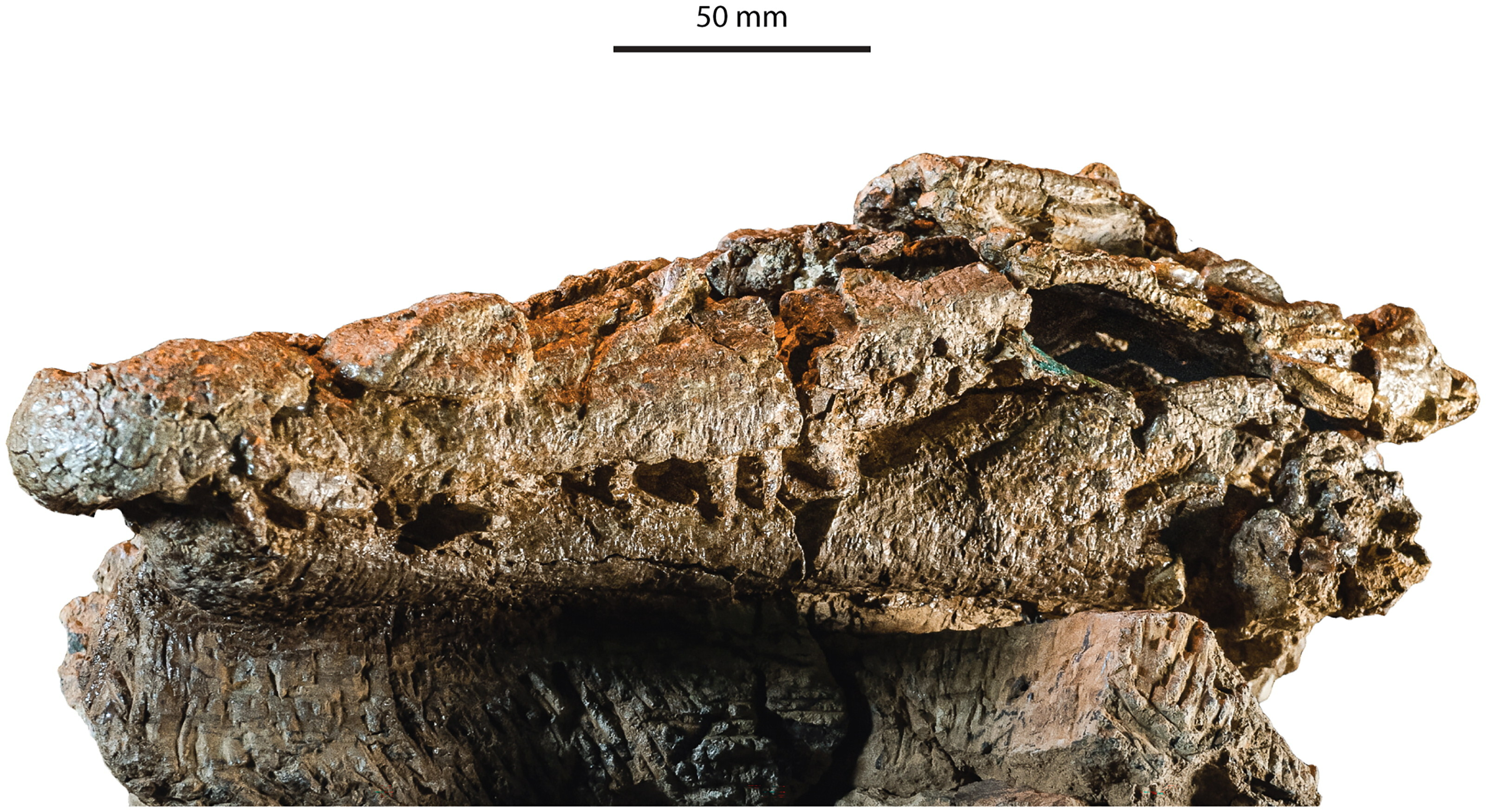
- Skull of the holotype
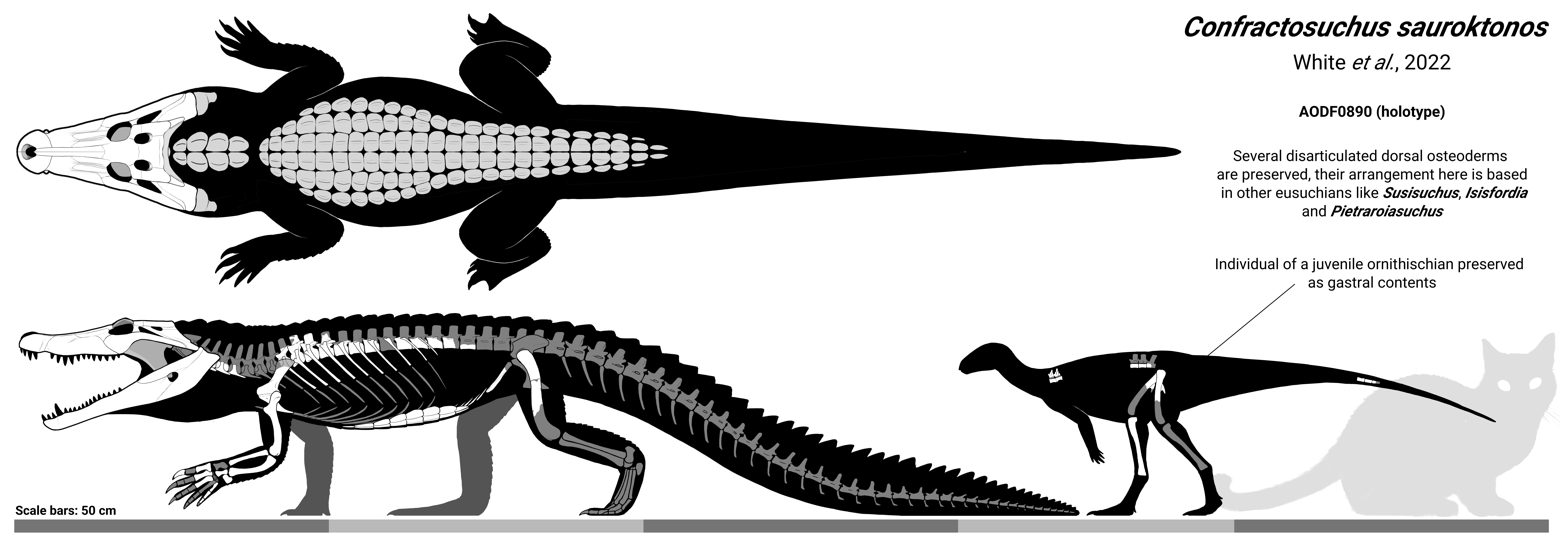
- Skeletal reconstruction, and size comparison of the juvenile ornithopod dinosaur preserved as gastral contents

Scientific classification
- Kingdom: Animalia
- Phylum: Chordata
- Class: Reptilia
- Clade: Archosauria
- Clade: Pseudosuchia
- Clade: Crocodylomorpha
- Clade: Eusuchia
- Genus: †Confractosuchus; White et al., 2022
- Species: †C. sauroktonos

Binomial name
- †Confractosuchus sauroktonos White et al., 2022 (type)

= Confractosuchus =

Confractosuchus Temporal range: Late Cretaceous (Cenomanian) 93 Ma

Extinct genus of eusuchian

Confractosuchus is a genus of extinct eusuchian crocodyliform from the Cretaceous Winton Formation of Australia. Described as a macro-generalist, Confractosuchus was found with the bones of a juvenile ornithopod dinosaur in its abdomen. It currently contains a single species, Confractosuchus sauroktonos, which literally means "broken dinosaur killer."

The discovery of Confractosuchus was announced by the Australian Age of Dinosaurs museum on 11 February 2022, and was published in the journal Gondwana Research. It is the second extinct eusuchian crocodyliform genus discovered from the Winton Formation, after Isisfordia that was discovered during the mid-1990s and named in 2006.

== Discovery and naming ==
Confractosuchus was found in the upper layers of the Winton Formation in central-western Queensland. It was discovered in 2010 during the excavation of poorly preserved sauropod material within a concretion that formed between black soil and volcanogenic clay. The fossil is largely articulated, but missing most material from the pelvis to the tail. Osteoderms were preserved in association.

In addition to the Eusuchian bones, the specimen also preserved the partially digested bones of a juvenile ornithopod the animal fed on shortly prior to its death. Initial CT scans of the abdominal cavity were unsuccessful as the dense matrix was opaque to laboratory and medical X-rays. Subsequent neutron tomography using the "Dingo" neutron imaging instrument at the Australian Nuclear Science and Technology Organisation serendipitously revealed the entirely embedded ornithopod. The bones indicate that the dinosaur was a juvenile and that its body could have weighed about 1.7 kg, and about the size of a chicken. Since the digestive secretions in the stomach of crocodiles are strong, the preserved dinosaur means that it was eaten shortly before the crocodyliform's death. The dinosaur is also likely an unknown (new) species.

The name Confractosuchus derives from the Latin confractus meaning "broken" and the Greek suchus for "crocodile." The species name is composed of the Greek sauros (meaning "lizard") and ktonos (meaning "killer"), chosen to reflect the preserved gut contents of the animal.

== Description ==
Most of the remains of Confractosuchus are badly crushed. Much of the posterior parts including the hind limbs and tail are missing. The skull measures 28.5 cm long and 19 cm wide and triangular in shape, differing noticeably from the broad and flattened skulls of the susisuchids it shared its environment with. The external nares are wider than they are long and the nasal bone overhangs the rear edge of the nares. There is a small constriction behind the nares where the 4th dentary tooth is received by the upper jaw. Two pairs of ridges extend over the cranium from the approximate location of the 4th dentary to just before the orbits. These ridges, originating from the lacrimal and prefrontal bone respectively, are similar to those seen in extant alligatoroids. They are almost parallel and converge towards the tip of the snout. Other ornamentation of the skull is present in the form of grooves and pits visible on the back of the skull, while the rostrum, aside from the aforementioned ridges, does not seem to preserve notable ornamentation. However, this may be due to preservation. The jugal is arched below the orbits, but flattened at its border with the intertemporal fenestra, mimicking the condition seen in susisuchids. The mandibles were preserved tightly shut with the upper jaw and only show ornamentation on its rear end. The upper jaw preserves 16 teeth on each side (4 premaxillary and 12 maxillary) and 17 dentary teeth.

The vertebral column is incompletely preserved. The centra and neural arches of the thoracic vertebrae are fused, however those of the cervical vertebrae aren't, suggesting the animal was a sub-adult at the time of its death. The morphology of Confractosuchus vertebrae varies, some showing a procoelous and others showing a less flexible amphicoelous condition. This morphology varies between susisuchids, with Susisuchus possessing exclusively amphicoelous vertebrae while Isisfordia shows beginning procoelous vertebrae. As both susisuchids and Confractosuchus are nested close to the base of Eusuchia, Confractosuchus may represent a transitional form.

None of the osteoderms of Confractosuchus were found in articulation. They are ovoid in shape and deeply pitted, with a central keel running down their surface. The lack of twin-keeled (biserial) osteoderms suggests that the paravertebral armor of the animal was entirely segmented. This adaptation greatly increases the flexibility of the animal in water when compared to the more tightly interlocking armor of goniopholids and pholidosaurids that increased stability when highwalking.

== Phylogeny ==
Phylogenetic analysis recovered Confractosuchus as a basal Eusuchian nested outside a clade formed by susisuchids and hylaeochampsids.

- Eusuchia
  - - - - Allodaposuchus precedens
        - - Lohuecosuchus mechinorum
          - Agaresuchus subjuniperus
      - - - Bernissartia fagesii
          - Koumpiodontosuchus aprosdokii
        - - Confractosuchus sauroktonos
          - - Susisuchidae
              - Isisfordia duncani
              - Susisuchus anatoceps
            - - - Acynodon adriaticus
                - Acynodon iberoccitanus
              - - Iharkutosuchus makadii
                - Hylaeochampsa vectiana
  - - Borealosuchus formadibilis
    - Crocodylia

== Paleoecology ==
Confractosuchus is a rare example of a fossil crocodyliform with preserved stomach content, and is the first evidence of a crocodyliform eating a dinosaur. Its prey, a juvenile ornithopod, is represented by multiple vertebrae and limb bones most likely belonging to a single individual. The vertebrae are partly articulated, party associated, suggesting the animal was not fully digested by the time the crocodyliform died. Analysis of the skull morphology suggests that Confractosuchus was a macro-generalist, meaning it would have been capable of taking prey larger than itself. It was likely an opportunistic feeder rather than a dinosaur specialist. The preservation of its prey indicates that the holotype of Confractosuchus died shortly after ingesting its last meal and it is not possible to determine whether or not the gut of Confractosuchus was more or less acidic than that of modern crocodiles. However, the condition the ornithopod vertebrae were found in suggests that it was dismembered in a similar fashion that modern crocodilians do.
