= Titanochampsa =

Titanochampsa Temporal range: Late Cretaceous, Maastrichtian

Scientific classification
- Kingdom: Animalia
- Phylum: Chordata
- Class: Reptilia
- Clade: Pseudosuchia
- Clade: Crocodylomorpha
- Clade: Mesoeucrocodylia
- Genus: †Titanochampsa; Fachini et al., 2022
- Species: †T. iorii

Binomial name
- †Titanochampsa iorii Fachini et al., 2022
- Titanochampsa type locality in São Paulo State, Brazil

Genus of extinct crocodilians

Titanochampsa is a genus of large mesoeucrocodylian from the Maastrichtian Marilia Formation of Brazil. Although only known from a single skull roof, the material shows that Titanochampsa was not a member of Notosuchia, which were previously believed to have been the only crocodyliforms present in the strata of the Bauru Group. Body size estimates vary greatly and range between 2.98–5.88 m (9 ft 9 in – 19 ft 3 in) due to the incomplete nature of the holotype fossil. The overall anatomy of the skull roof, alongside its size and possible affinities with Neosuchians, may suggest that it was a semi-aquatic ambush hunter similar to modern crocodilians.

== History and naming ==
Titanochampsa is only known from a single fossil, holotype specimen MPMA 02–0005/87, a partial skull roof of great size. This fossil was discovered in layers of the Marilia Formation in the Monte Alto municipality of southeast Brazil, a region which is otherwise dominated by the older Adamantina Formation. The strata of the Marilia Formation correspond with the Maastrichtian age. The initial discovery of the fossil was made in 1987 and the remains were subsequently thought to have belonged to a titanosaur sauropod, partly due to its great size. Later research conducted on the specimen however revealed it to have belonged to some kind of crocodyliform and a brief description was published by Iori and Arruda-Campos in 2016. In this paper the material was primarily compared to other Notosuchians, but no precise assignment was made. A more detailed description was eventually published by Fachini and colleagues six years later, conducting a thorough phylogenetic analysis and establishing a distinct genus for the material.

The name Titanochampsa derives from the Greek "Titan", in allusion to the fossil's size and prior titanosaur assignment, and "champsus" meaning crocodile. The species name was chosen to honor Fabiano V. Ior, a Brazilian paleontologist who had previously worked on the remains and recognized them to have belonged to a crocodyliform.

== Description ==
The type specimen of Titanochampsa represents a single incomplete skull roof preserving most of the right side including the parietal bone, frontal bone, squamosal and postorbital. The quadratojugal and supraoccipital are less well preserved. The ornamentation is still visible on parts of the skull despite the abbrasion of the external surface and consists of faint groves and pits spaced at regular intervals. This sets them apart from baurusuchids, which possess different ornamentation across different parts of the skull, as well as peirosaurids and modern crocodilians, in which the pits and groves are more pronounced. The supratemporal fenestrae are approximately triangular and both externally as well as internally large, making up 50% of the skull roof and suggesting the presence of powerful adductor muscles on the lower jaw. The animal's autapomorphies include the anteroposterior projections of the squamosal and parietal, which are about as long as the supratemporal fenestrae, a postorbital-supratemporal bar thicker than the corresponding element of the squamosal and a grove exclusively located on the squamosal that would hold the upper earlid.

In an attempt to estimate the skull length of Titanochampsa the width of the skull table was measured and compared to various crocodyliforms that fall into the same general size range. Due to the uncertain placement of the animal a variety of other taxa were used including both extant species like the American alligator and American crocodile as well as extinct genera like Stratiotosuchus, Uberabasuchus and Eosuchus. The vastly different morphology and ecology of these taxa resulted in very different lower and upper skull length estimates, ranging from 37.01–74.43 cm (14.57–29.30 in). Due to this large difference, body length was estimated for both values rather than using a mean, giving a potential total length of 2.98–5.88 m (9 ft 9 in – 19 ft 3 in).

== Phylogeny ==
Two phylogenetic analysis, one based on Martínez et al. 2018 and another based on Ruiz et al. 2021, were conducted, both of which recovering Titanochampsa nested deep within Neosuchia, more specifically within Eusuchia. The Martínez dataset recovers Titanochampsa in a large polytomy at the base of Longirostres alongside Argochampsa, Asiatosuchus germanicus and the extant Crocodylus genus. However, there is little support for this arrangement and the only supporting synapomorphy can not be determined in Titanochampsa. In general this analysis provides little evidence for the taxon's placement within Neosuchia. Following the matrix of Ruiz, another polytomy was recovered, however in this instance the polytomy includes several more basal Eusuchian taxa such as Allodaposuchus, Hylaeochampsa, Iharkutosuchus and the Susisuchidae. However much like in the other analysis, of the few characters supporting this grouping none can be found in Titanochampsa and only few directly support its placement as a Neosuchian. Subsequently, Fachini and colleagues hesitate to assign Titanochampsa even to Neosuchia, instead only specifying its classification as a mesoeucrocodylian. There are however several non-synapomorphic traits linking the taxon to Neosuchians, such as the rectangular skull table and flat supratemporal rim.

- Eusuchia
  - - Theriosuchus
    - Alligatorium
  - - - Goniopholis simus
      - - - Sunosuchus
          - Calsoyasuchus
        - - Eutretauranosuchus
          - Goniopholis stovalli
    - - - Glen Rose Form
        - Bernissartia
      - - - Rugosuchus
          - Shamosuchus
        - - Hylaeochampsa
          - - Borealosuchus
            - - Pristichampsus vorax
              - Crocodylia
                - - Leidyosuchus canadensis
                  - - Alligator
                    - Diplocynodon hantoniensis
                - - Argochampsa
                  - Crocodylus
                  - Asiatosuchus germanicus
                  - Titanochampsa iorii
                  - - Eothoracosaurus mississippiensis
                    - Gavialis gangeticus

- - Eusuchia
    - Theriosuchus
    - - - Batrachomimus pastobonensis
        - - Sunosuchus
          - - Eutretauranosuchus delfsi
            - - Amphicotylus lucasii
              - - Goniopholis simus
                - Goniopholis kiplingi
      - - Bernissartia fagesi
        - - - Shamosuchus djadochtaensis
            - Rugosuchus nonganensis
          - - Titanochampsa iorii
            - Gavialis gangeticus
            - Hylaeochampsa vectiana
            - Allodaposuchus precedens
            - - Crocodylus
              - Alligator mississippiensis
            - - Susisuchus anatoceps
              - Isisfordia duncani
            - - Lohuecosuchus megadontos
              - Agaresuchus fontiensis
            - - Pietraroiasuchus ormezzanoi
              - Iharkutosuchus makadii

However, while the authors were unable to fully support Neosuchian affinities, they were capable of clearly distinguishing the genus from Notosuchians. Titanochampsa differs from baurusuchids through twelve anatomical characters, two of which are synapomorphies of the family. The skull table in general differs widely from any known baurusuchid. Likewise, the authors also point towards several key differences between Titanochampsa and peirosaurids, another clade of crocodylomorphs prominently present in the Bauru group.

== Paleobiology ==
Research conducted on the Marilia Formation suggests that it was formed by fluvial deposits under arid to semiarid conditions. Specifically, it is hypothesized that the Marilia sediments represent the distal end of such a system, closer to the origin of the individual rivers. This would explain the relative abundance of fossils discovered in the Serra da Galga Formation (formerly considered to be a part of the same formation) compared to the Marilia Formation where Titanochampsa had been found. Overall these conditions suggest that Titanochampsa was native to ephemeral bodies of water in the distal ends of a fluvial system.

The notosuchians which are commonly found in other stratigraphic units of the Bauru group are thought to have had relatively weak bite forces and the largest known predatory species appear to have reached a maximum length of approximately 4 m (13 ft). Compared to that, Titanochampsa possesses large internal supratemporal fenestra allowing for a much stronger bite and following the body size estimates it would likely be comparable to the larger notosuchian taxa of the older Adamantina Formation. The strong bite and great size, coupled with the possible affinities with eusuchians and environmental conditions, might suggest that Titanochampsa was a semi-aquatic ambush hunter similar to modern crocodilians. This would strongly set it apart from the other, primarily terrestrial, crocodyliforms of the Bauru Group. Fachini and colleagues speculate that the appearance of a crocodyliform with this lifestyle might tie into the climatic changes the area underwent during the later phases of this time period, however they note that more material would be required to be certain.
