= Pietraroiasuchus =

Pietraroiasuchus Temporal range: Early Cretaceous, ~112–100 Ma

Scientific classification
- Domain: Eukaryota
- Kingdom: Animalia
- Phylum: Chordata
- Class: Reptilia
- Clade: Archosauria
- Clade: Pseudosuchia
- Clade: Crocodylomorpha
- Clade: Crocodyliformes
- Clade: Metasuchia
- Clade: Neosuchia
- Clade: Eusuchia
- Family: †Hylaeochampsidae
- Genus: †Pietraroiasuchus; Buscalioni et al., 2011

Type species
- †Pietraroiasuchus ormezzanoi Buscalioni et al., 2011

Extinct genus of reptiles

Pietraroiasuchus is an extinct genus of hylaeochampsid eusuchian crocodylomorph from the Pietraroja Plattenkalk of the southern Apennines, Italy. Below is a cladogram showing the phylogenetic placement of Pietraroiasuchus from Buscalioni et al., 2011:

- Neosuchia
  - Theriosuchus
  - - Goniopholis
    - - Bernissartia fagesii
      - - Susisuchus anatoceps
        - - Las Hoyas neosuchian
          - Eusuchia
            - Isisfordia duncani
            - - - Hylaeochampsidae
                  - Hylaeochampsa vectiana
                  - - Iharkutosuchus
                    - - Pietraroiasuchus ormezzanoi
                      - Pachycheilosuchus trinquei
                - - Allodaposuchus sp.
                  - Allodaposuchus precedens
              - Crocodylia
                - - - Borealosuchus sternbergi
                    - - Borealosuchus formidabilis
                      - - Borealosuchus wilsoni
                        - Borealosuchus acutidentatus
                  - Gavialoidea
                - Brevirostres
                  - Pristichampsus
                  - - Alligatoroidea
                    - Crocodyloidea
