= Unasuchus =

Unasuchus Temporal range: Early Cretaceous, Barremian

Scientific classification
- Domain: Eukaryota
- Kingdom: Animalia
- Phylum: Chordata
- Class: Reptilia
- Clade: Archosauria
- Clade: Pseudosuchia
- Clade: Crocodylomorpha
- Clade: Neosuchia
- Clade: Eusuchia
- Family: †Hylaeochampsidae
- Genus: †Unasuchus; Brinkmann, 1992

Species
- †U. reginae Brinkmann, 1992 (type)

Extinct genus of reptiles

Unasuchus is an extinct genus of Early Cretaceous eusuchian belonging to the family Hylaeochampsidae. The genus is named after Uña, a municipality in central Spain where fossils have been found.

== Discovery and classification ==
Unasuchus is known only from skull and jaw fragments, meaning that it initially defied precise classification within Crocodyliformes, but the cladistic analysis of Turcosuchus recovers Unasuchus as a derived hylaeochampsid. These remains have been found from the Barremian Las Hoyas Formation. The type species, U. reginae, was named in 1992.
