= Wannagan Creek site =

Fossil site in North Dakota, US

The Wannagan Creek site is a fossil site found just west of the South Unit of Theodore Roosevelt National Park of North Dakota, US. The site is Paleocene in age, approximately 60 million years old. Paleontologists of the Science Museum of Minnesota have studied the site for nearly thirty years. The site is thought to represent a paleoenviroment of subtropical swampy lowland and forests. Preservation is excellent for both the flora and fauna of the site. Trace fossils of crocodilians and other vertebrates have also been discovered.

== Topography/Geology ==
The topography of the site is that of a badland, due to the downcutting of the Little Missouri River. The rock units are likely sediments derived from the Laramide orogeny deposited in an ecosystem dominated by rivers, streams, ponds, lakes, and swamps.

The Wannagan Site is found in the upper portion of the Tongue River Formation (formerly Bullion Creek Formation). The rocks of this deposit, reaching a thickness of over 60 m, consist of yellow to tan, poorly lithified claystones, mudstones, and siltstones with a lesser amounts of interbedded fine-grained sandstones and lignite. The site is overlain by the Sentinel Butte Formation. This formation is generally gray to brown in color but is similar in lithology to the Tongue River. The Sentinel Butte is roughly 90 m thick. The contact between the two formations is roughly 6 m above the site. The Sentinel Butte contains an extensive stump-bearing petrified wood bed above the contact at the site.

== Fauna ==
Many mammals are found at Wannagan. All are small compared to modern mammals, the largest being sheep-sized. Preserved mammals include a squirrel-like primitive primate and Ptilodus, an arboreal multituberculate. The largest mammal at the site is the condylarth herbivore Phenacodus. An additional mammal fossil is Protictis, a weasel sized member of Viverridae that may have hunted on the forest floor.

Reptiles are the dominant animal type preserved at Wannagan. The largest animal (~4 meters [13 ft] in length) found at the site is the eusuchian crocodilian Borealosuchus formidabilis (formerly known as Leidyosuchus formidabilis). B. formidabilis is also thought to be the apex predator of the fauna. The second largest reptile is the champsosaur Champsosaurus gigas. C. gigas is unusual among Paleocene reptiles in that it is larger than its known Mesozoic ancestors: 3 meters (10 ft) in length versus 1.5 meters (4.5 ft) for the largest Cretaceous champsosaurs. Reptiles as a whole decreased in size after the Cretaceous–Paleogene extinction event. Other reptiles include soft-shelled turtles, varanid lizards, a small alligatorid called Wannaganosuchus, palaeophid snakes, and the snapping turtle-like Protochelydra zangerli.

Birds from Wannagan include an ibis, an unnamed water bird, and a plover-like shore bird. The two types amphibians found at Wannagan are the giant salamander Piceorpeton willwoodense and frogs. Fish include fossil Esox, freshwater rays, gar, and bowfin. Additionally, the dragonfly Gomphaeschna schrankii and the mayfly Ephemeropteran have been found.

== Flora ==
The flora of Wannagan is quite well preserved in some cases, with evidence of insect feeding found on many fossils. Most of the fossils have modern equivalents. The list of trees at Wannagan Creek include palms, ginkgo trees, bald cypress, dogwoods, oaks, elms, fig trees, magnolias, dawn redwoods, hackberries, sassafras, sycamores, cherries, mulberries, and cycads. Additional plants found at the site are grape vines, lotus, bur-reeds, cattails, and water-plantago.

== See also ==
- List of fossil sites (with link directory)
