= Heterosuchus =

Heterosuchus Temporal range: Early Cretaceous, 140–125 Ma

Scientific classification
- Domain: Eukaryota
- Kingdom: Animalia
- Phylum: Chordata
- Class: Reptilia
- Clade: Archosauria
- Clade: Pseudosuchia
- Clade: Crocodylomorpha
- Clade: Crocodyliformes
- Family: †Hylaeochampsidae
- Genus: †Heterosuchus; Seeley, 1887

Type species
- †Heterosuchus valdensis Seeley, 1887

Extinct genus of reptiles

Heterosuchus is an extinct genus of crocodylomorph that may have been a eusuchian. It is known only from neck and back vertebrae recovered from Early Cretaceous-age rocks of the Hastings Beds (Wealden Group) of Hastings, Sussex. These vertebrae are procoelous (ball-and-socket articulation with the socket in front and the ball on the back of individual vertebrae), which is a trait of eusuchians. Heterosuchus was described by Harry Seeley in 1887, with H. valdensis as the type species. It may be the same genus as the slightly younger Hylaeochampsa, inferred to have been of similar evolutionary grade, but there is no overlapping material as Hylaeochampsa is known only from a partial skull; Hylaeochampsa would be the name used for both in that case, because it is the older name (coined in 1874). Because of the sparse material and apparent lack of distinguishing characteristics, James Clark and Mark Norell (1992) considered Heterosuchus a dubious name.
