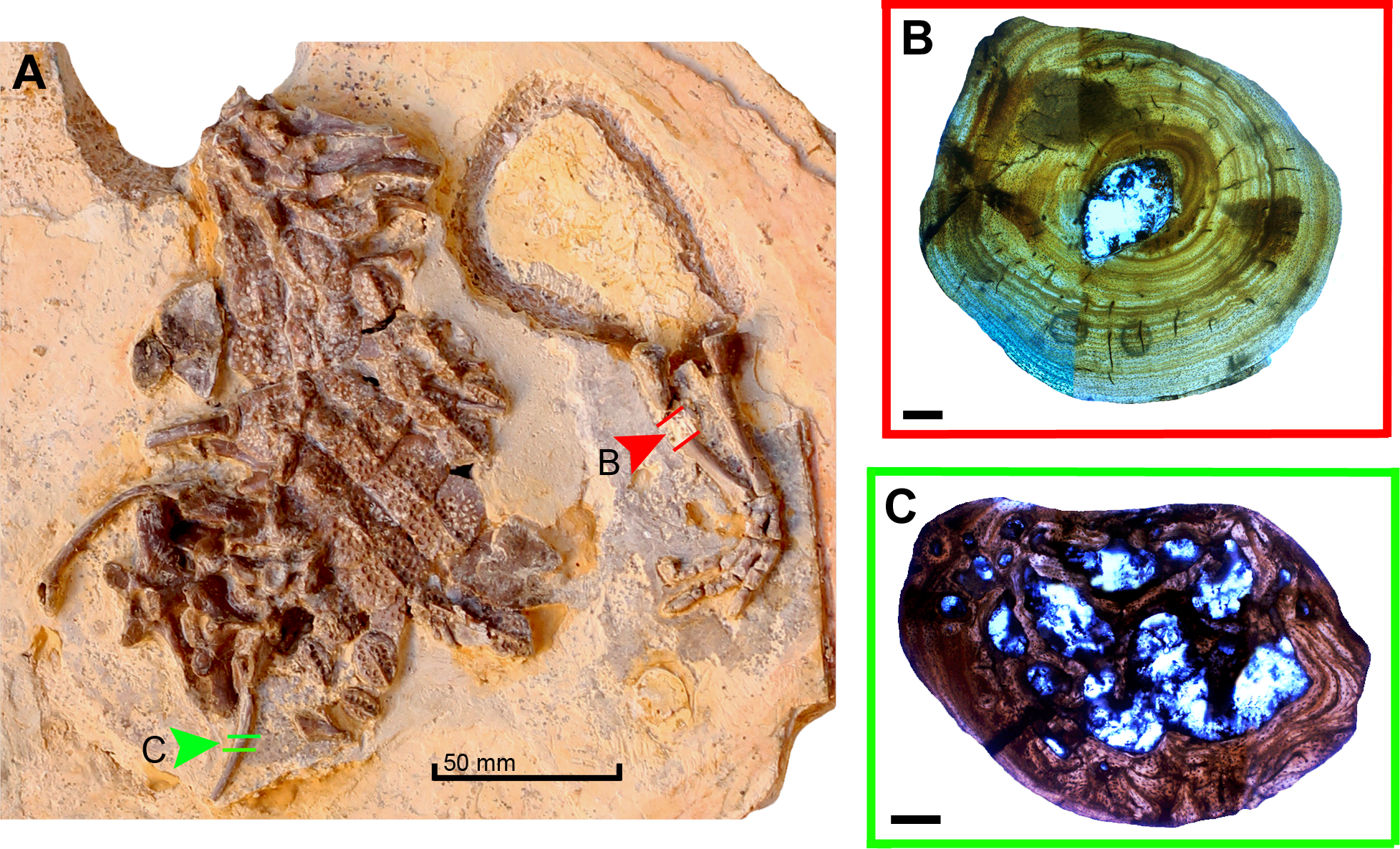
- S. anatoceps specimen (A) and cross sectioned samples (B-C)

Scientific classification
- Domain: Eukaryota
- Kingdom: Animalia
- Phylum: Chordata
- Class: Reptilia
- Clade: Archosauria
- Clade: Pseudosuchia
- Clade: Crocodylomorpha
- Clade: Crocodyliformes
- Clade: Neosuchia
- Family: †Susisuchidae; Salisbury et al., 2003
- Genus: †Susisuchus; Salisbury et al., 2003

Species
- †S. anatoceps Salisbury et al., 2003 (type); †S. jaguaribensis Fortier and Schultz, 2009

= Susisuchus =

Susisuchus Temporal range: Early Cretaceous

Extinct genus of reptiles

Susisuchus is an extinct genus of neosuchian mesoeucrocodylian crocodyliform from the Early Cretaceous of Brazil. Fossils have been found from the Nova Olinda Member of the Aptian-age Crato Formation in the Araripe and Lima Campos Basins of northeastern Brazil. Named in 2003, Susisuchus is the sole member of the family Susisuchidae, and is closely related to the clade Eusuchia, which includes living crocodilians. The type species is S. anatoceps, known from a single partial articulated skeleton that preserves some soft tissue. A second species, S. jaguaribensis, was named in 2009 from fragmentary remains.

== Discovery ==
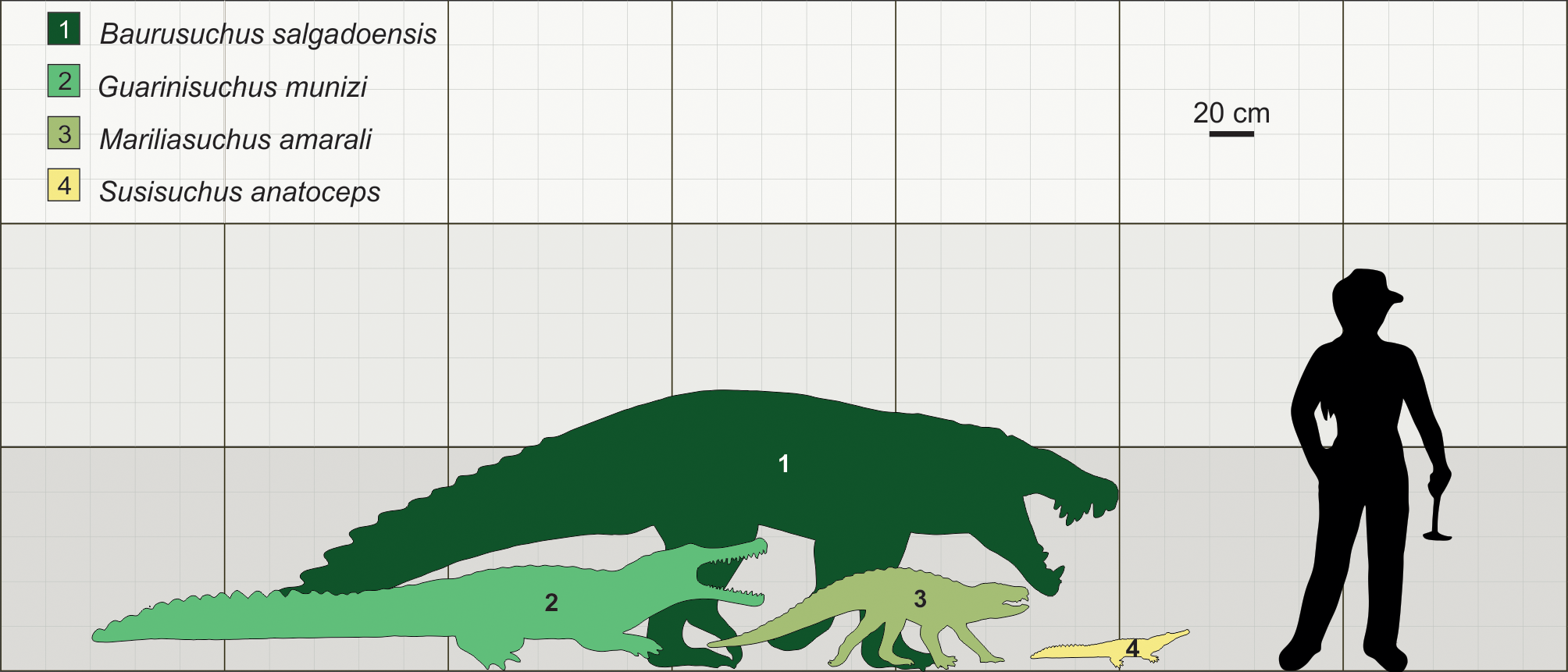
Size of S. anatoceps and other Brazilian Cretaceous crocodylomorphs

The genus Susisuchus was first erected with the description of the type species S. anatoceps in 2003. S. anatoceps was found in the Aptian-age Crato Formation in the Araripe Basin, and was the first crocodyliform to be described from the formation. The holotype skeleton is the most complete known specimen of Susisuchus, including most of the bones except for those of the hindlimbs, and even traces of soft tissue. The specimen is thought to have been a desiccated carcass before it was buried and later fossilized. A second species, S. jaguaribensis, was named in 2009 from the Lima Campos Basin about 115 kilometres (71 mi) from where the skeleton of S. anatoceps was uncovered.

A new crocodyliform specimen from the Crato Formation was described in 2009. It can be distinguished from the two other crocodyliforms known from the formation, Araripesuchus and the trematochampsid Caririsuchus, on the basis of characteristics of the fibula and proportions of the femur and tibia. Since the limb elements differ from all other known crocodyliforms from the Araripe Basin, the specimen was tentatively classified as cf. Susisuchus sp.

== Description ==
The holotype specimen of Susisuchus anatoceps includes a skull and lower jaw, forelimbs, parts of the axial skeleton, and some osteoderms. There are traces of soft tissue around both forelimbs and the digits of the right hand. S. jaguaribensis is known from far less material, but the fragmentary remains are enough to diagnose the species. Both species have a contact between the squamosal and parietal bones that is situated on the posterior border of the supratemporal fenestra, a hole in the skull table.

=== Osteoderms ===
Segmentation of dorsal osteoderms over time in advanced neosuchians (Susisuchus second from left).

Susisuchus has a dorsal shield of osteoderms that is similar to those of the more derived clade Eusuchia, which includes living crocodilians. Susisuchus was one of the first mesoeucrocodylians to have a tetraserial paravertebral shield, which is formed from the dorsal osteoderms to make the back more rigid. In a tetraserial paravertebral shield, there are four separate rows of paravertebral osteoderms (osteoderms near the midline of the back). Earlier mesoeucrocodylians such as Bernissartia have biserial paravertebral shields, in which there are only two rows of paravertebral osteoderms. These two rows of large osteoderms became segmented into four smaller rows in Susisuchus. Susisuchus also has two rows of accessory osteoderms to either side of the paravertebral osteoderms which are not part of the shield.

The segmentation of the paravertebral shield allowed for a greater degree of lateral flexibility in the trunk of Susisuchus. This flexibility would have enabled lateral undulation while swimming, resulting in greater efficiency in locomotion. Because the width of the paravertebral shield was not compromised by this segmentation, the back would remain rigid enough to overcome the forces encountered during high-walking, or walking semi-erect. However, the ability to high-walk would have restricted the size of Susisuchus. If Susisuchus grew any larger than 50 kilograms (110 lb), the forces encountered during high-walking would have been too great for the paravertebral shield to counteract.

== Classification ==
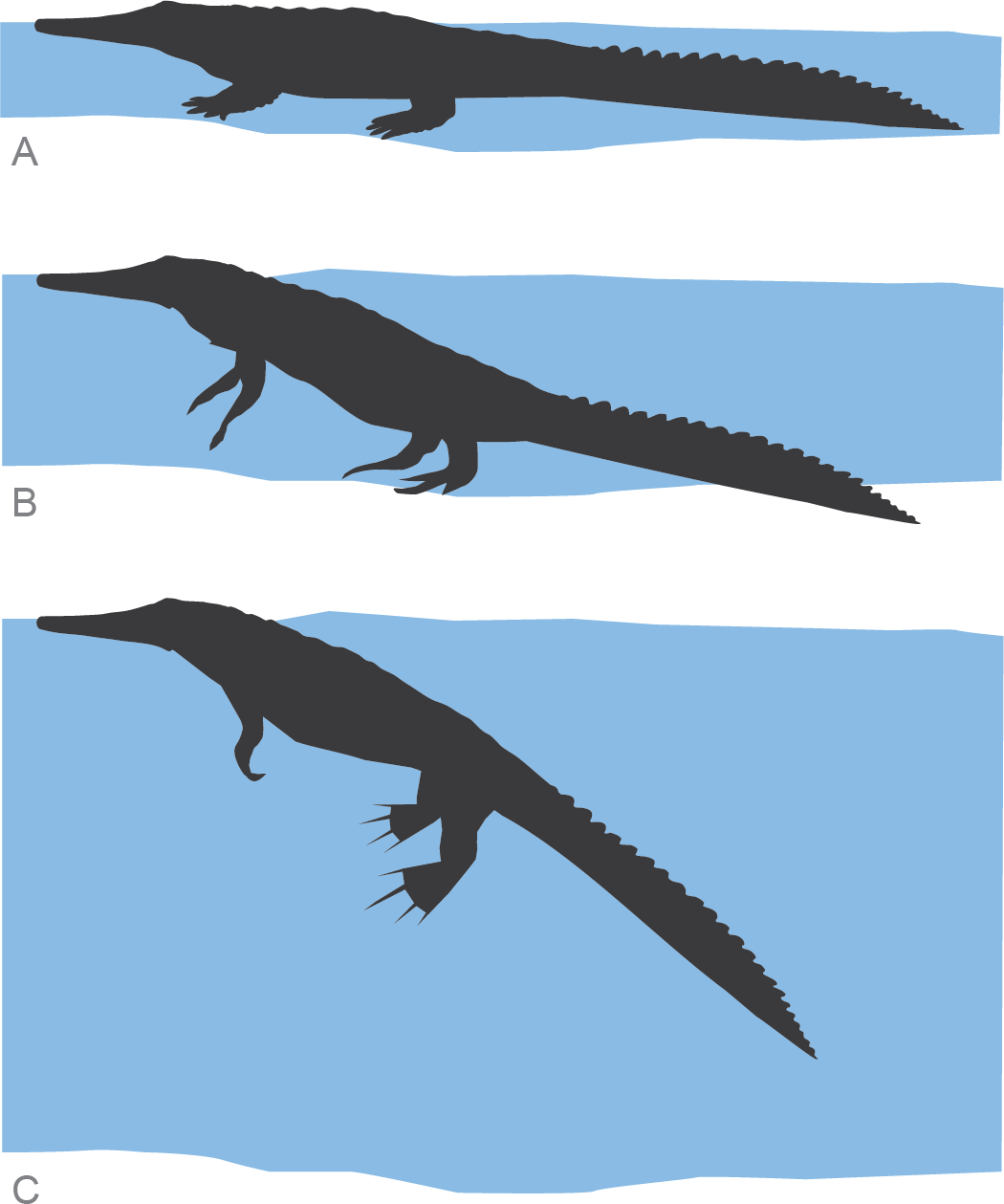
Possible resting postures of S. anatoceps at various depths

Susisuchus is closely related to Pachycheilosuchus from Glen Rose, Texas, United States, and Isisfordia from Winton, Queensland, Australia. All three genera are highly derived Early Cretaceous mesoeucrocodylians. In the initial description of Susisuchidae, Isisfordia was considered a possible member of the family, although the genus had not yet been named. However, with its naming in 2006, Isisfordia was placed within Eusuchia as the most basal member of the clade, while Susisuchus was placed outside Eusuchia as its sister taxon. Below is a cladogram from Salisbury et al. (2006) showing the relationships of Susisuchus and Isisfordia within Mesoeucrocodylia:

- Mesoeucrocodylia'
  - Theriosuchus spp.
  - - Goniopholis spp.
    - - Bernissartia fagesii
      - - Susisuchus anatoceps
        - Eusuchia
          - Isisfordia duncani
          - - - Hylaeochampsa vectiana
              - Allodaposuchus precedens
            - Crocodylia

Susisuchus has amphicoelus thoracic, lumbar and caudal (tail) vertebrae, meaning that the ends of the centra of these vertebrae are concave. The presence of this feature in a crocodyliform with a tetraserial paravertebral shield is unusual, and has been used to erect the family Susisuchidae, of which Susisuchus is the only member. Susisuchus can be considered a transitional form because it has a tetraserial paravertebral shield characteristic of eusuchians, but retains more primitive amphicoelus vertebrae characteristic of more basal crocodylomorphs.

With the description of S. jaguaribensis as a second species of Susisuchus, the genus has been phylogenetically redefined as a node-based taxon including the last common ancestor of Susisuchus anatoceps and Susisuchus jaguaribensis and all of its descendants.
