= Turcosuchus =

Turcosuchus Temporal range: Early Cretaceous, Barremian

Scientific classification
- Domain: Eukaryota
- Kingdom: Animalia
- Phylum: Chordata
- Class: Reptilia
- Clade: Archosauria
- Clade: Pseudosuchia
- Clade: Crocodylomorpha
- Family: †Hylaeochampsidae
- Genus: †Turcosuchus; Jouve et al. 2019
- Species: †T. okani

Binomial name
- †Turcosuchus okani Jouve et al. 2019

Extinct genus of basal eusuchian crocodyliform

Turcosuchus is an extinct genus of basal eusuchian crocodyliform known from the Early Cretaceous İncigez Formation in Turkey. It contains a single species, T. okani.
