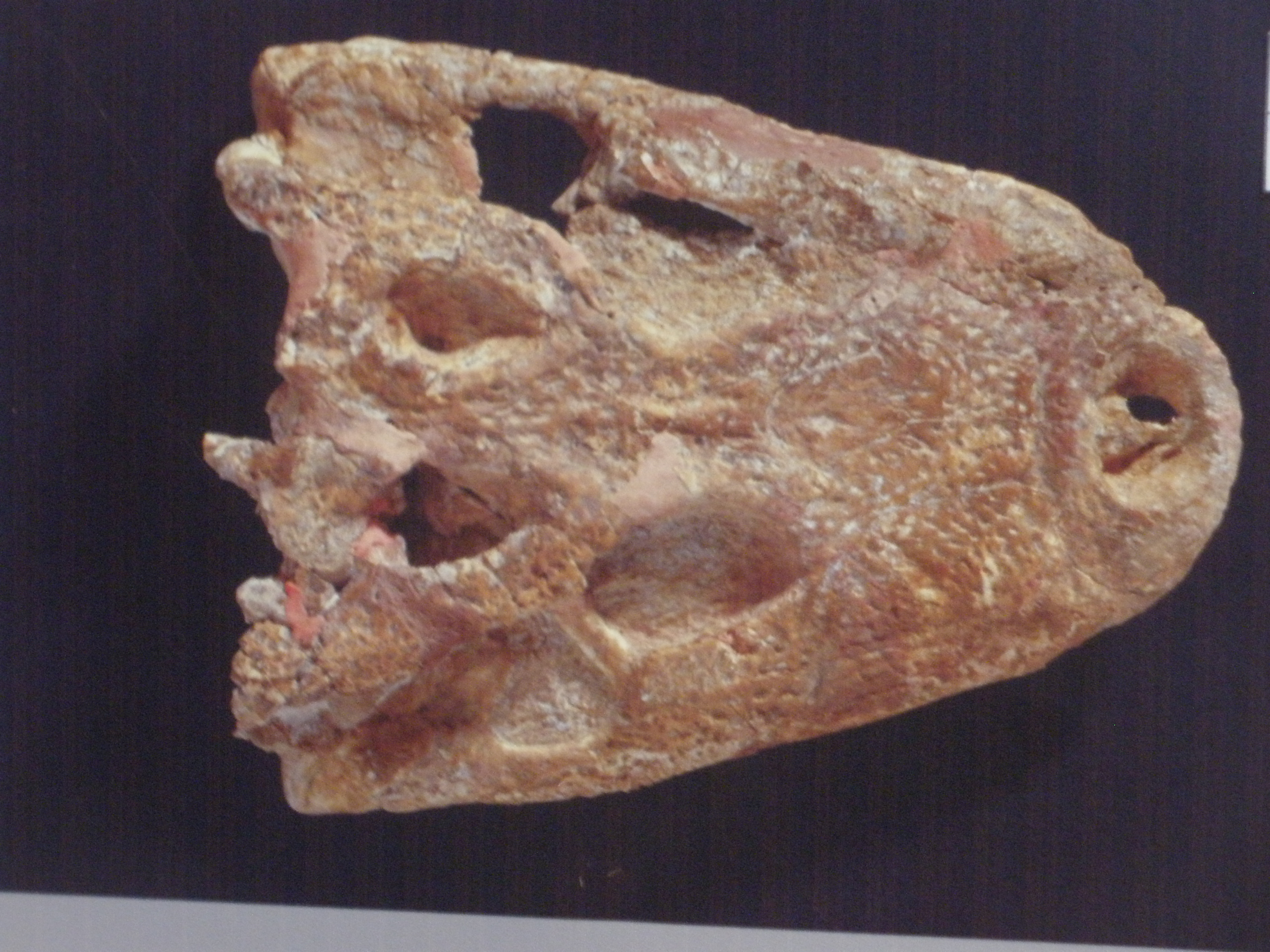
- Skull of Acynodon iberoccitanus (ACAP-FXl)

Scientific classification
- Kingdom: Animalia
- Phylum: Chordata
- Class: Reptilia
- Clade: Pseudosuchia
- Clade: Crocodylomorpha
- Clade: Metasuchia
- Clade: Neosuchia
- Clade: Eusuchia
- Genus: †Acynodon; Buscalioni et al., 1997

Species
- †A. iberoccitanus Buscalioni et al., 1997 (type); †A. adriaticus Delfino et al., 2008; †A. lopezi Buscalioni et al., 1997

= Acynodon =

Acynodon Temporal range: Santonian - Maastrichtian, 86–68 Ma

Extinct genus of reptiles

Acynodon is an extinct genus of eusuchian crocodylomorph from the Late Cretaceous, with fossils found throughout Southern Europe.

== Classification ==
The genus Acynodon contains three species: A. iberoccitanus, A. adriaticus, and A. lopezi. Fossils have been found in France, Spain, Italy, and Romania, dating back to the Santonian, Campanian and Maastrichtian periods of the Late Cretaceous. Isolated teeth from the paleontological site of Kozina in Slovenia may be referable to A. adriaticus.

When first described in 1997, it was placed within the family Alligatoridae. New findings a decade later led to it being reclassified as a basal globidontan. Recent studies have since resolved Acynodon as a basal eusuchian crocodylomorph, outside of the Crocodylia crown group, and a close relative to Hylaeochampsa.

== Description ==
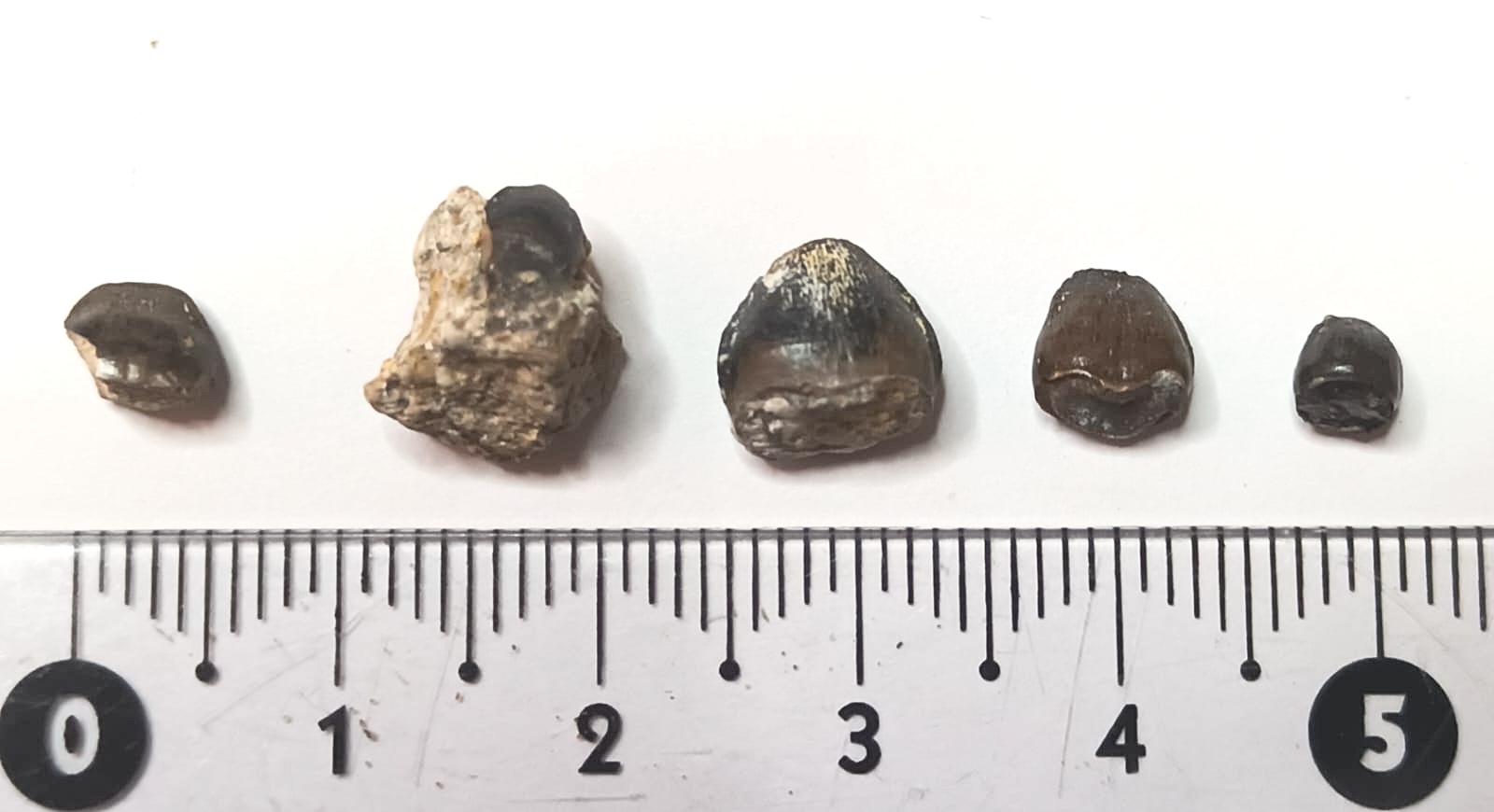
Teeth of Acynodon sp. from the Campanian of Villeveyrac, Hérault, France. Max Rouger Collection.

The skull of Acynodon is extremely brevirostrine; it had a very short and broad snout compared to other known eusuchians, and a specialized muscle arrangement to optimize biting force. Its dentition was quite derived, with the species A. adriaticus bearing extremely enlarged molariform teeth and a lack of maxillary and dentary caniniform teeth, presumably an adaptation to feed on slow prey with hard shells. A. adriaticus was highly specialized to durophagy, likely in shallow, densely vegetated waters as suggested by its small orbits, avoiding competition with other sympatric crocodylomorphs like the generalist Allodaposuchus or the terrestrial Doratodon. It had an acute lateral snout profile in comparison to the more rounded shape of A. iberoccitanus. A. adriaticus is the only species preserving articulated postcranial material in at least two specimens. These show the typical semiacquatic proportions and paravertebral osteoderms bearing a distinctively double-keel. Histological thin sections of a specimen's dorsal rib show a thickened cortical layer, possibly associated with strong aquatic adaptations, and at least 31 Lines of Arrested Growth (LAGs) despite the specimen being a somatically immature individual. This suggests that the species was relatively long lived and underwent a steady slow growth.
