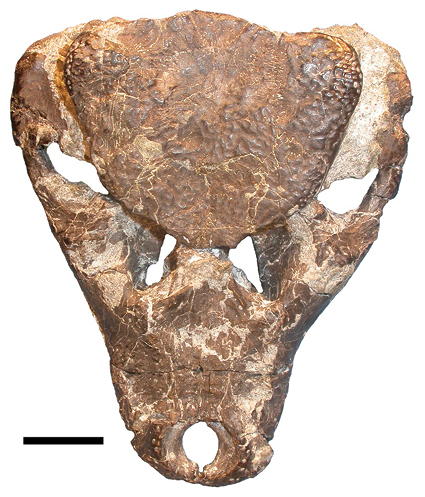
- Iharkutosuchus skull

Scientific classification
- Kingdom: Animalia
- Phylum: Chordata
- Class: Reptilia
- Clade: Pseudosuchia
- Clade: Crocodylomorpha
- Clade: Metasuchia
- Clade: Neosuchia
- Clade: Eusuchia
- Family: †Hylaeochampsidae; Andrews, 1913

Genera
- †Acynodon?; †Heterosuchus; †Hylaeochampsa; †Iharkutosuchus; †Pachycheilosuchus?; †Pietraroiasuchus; †Turcosuchus

= Hylaeochampsidae =

Hylaeochampsidae Temporal range: Cretaceous, 130–83 Ma Barremian - Santonian

Extinct family of reptiles

Hylaeochampsidae is an extinct family of basal eusuchian crocodylomorphs thought to be closely related to the order Crocodylia.

== Classification ==
Life reconstruction (left) and muscle diagram (right) of Iharkutosuchus
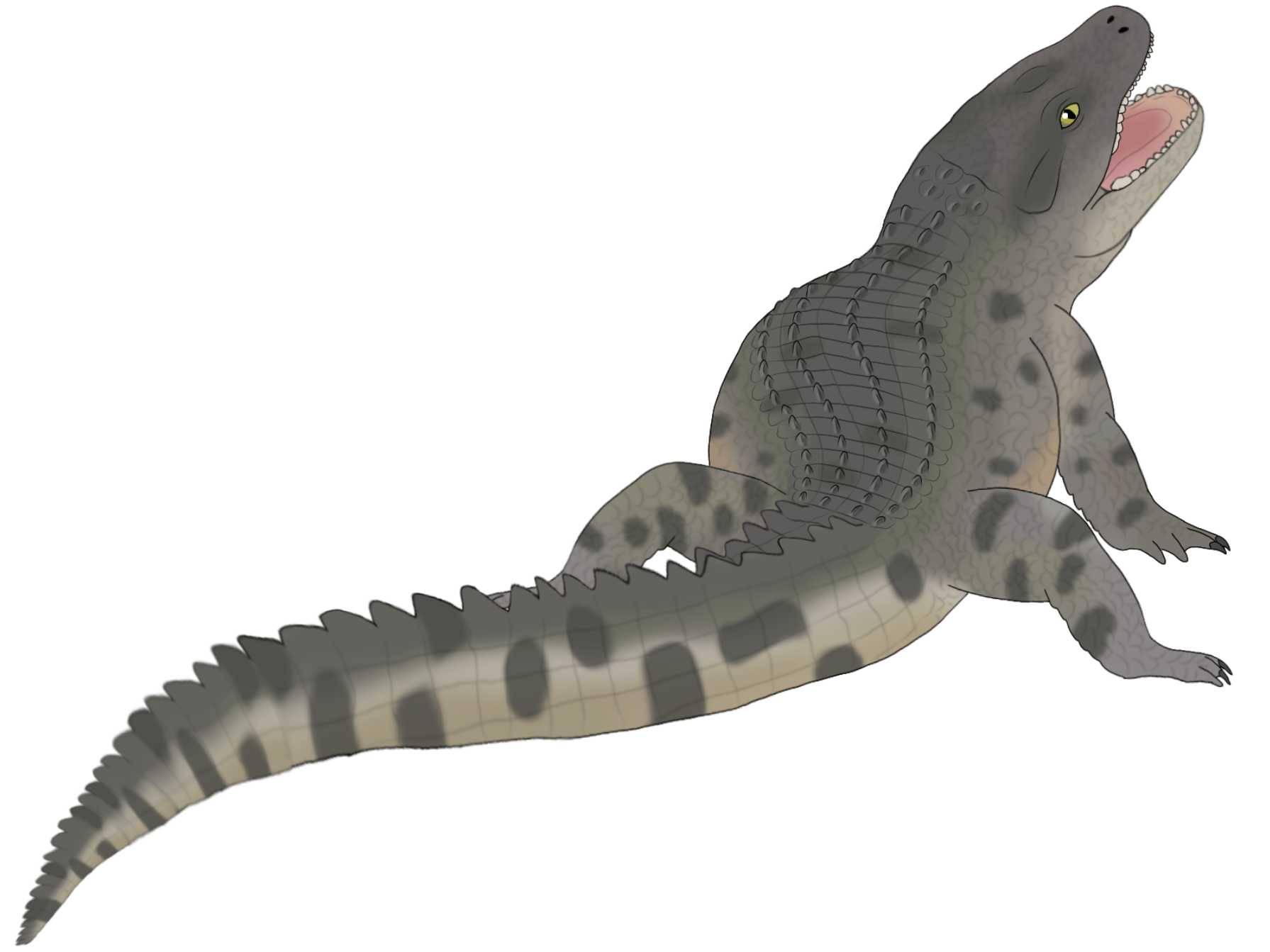
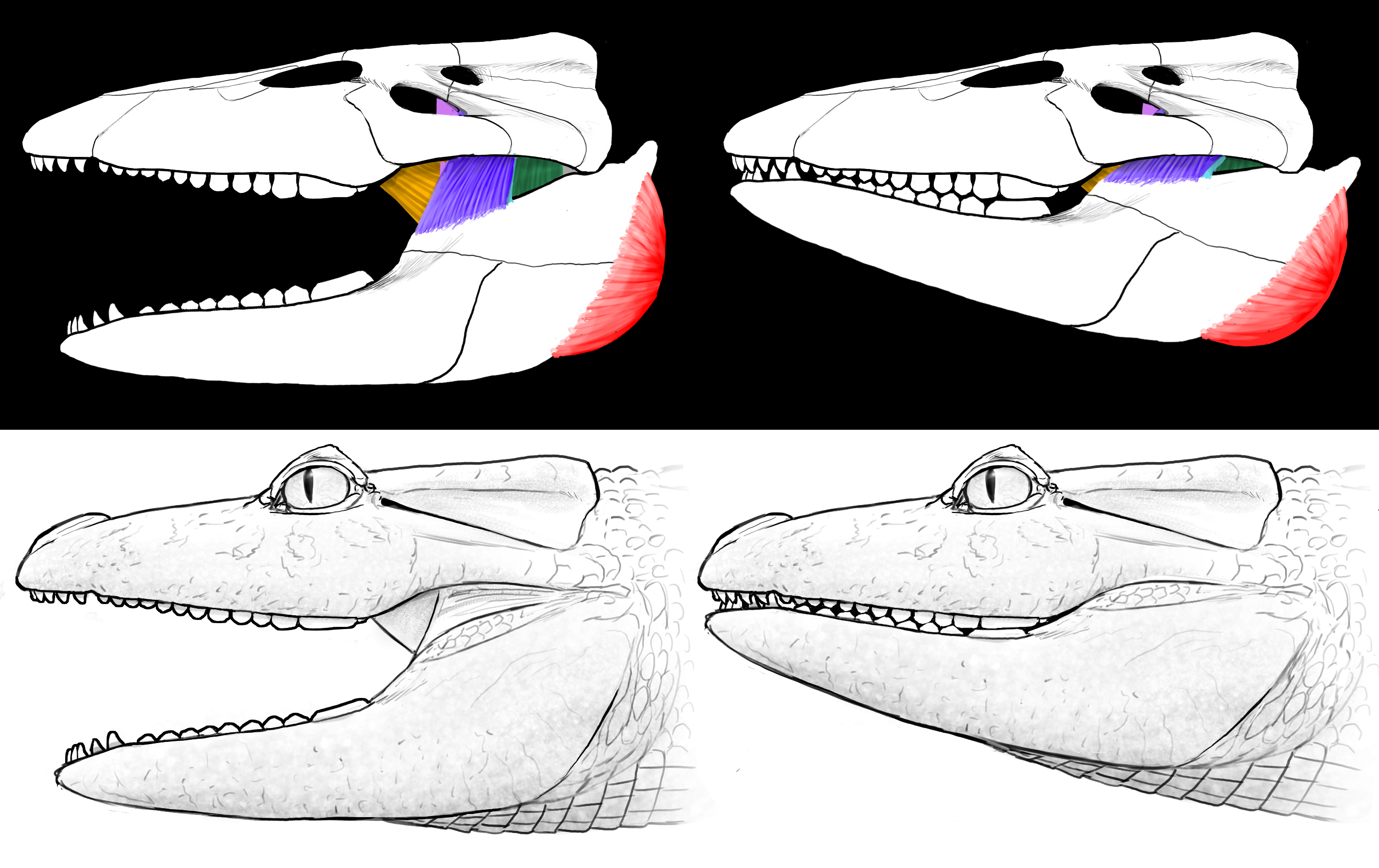

Hylaeochampsidae was first constructed by Charles William Andrews in 1913 to include just one member: Hylaeochampsa. However, a new genus named Iharkutosuchus was described in 2007 and was found to be a sister taxon of Hylaeochampsa, and thus a member of the family Hylaeochampsidae. The genus Heterosuchus, named in 1887, may also be a member of the family. However, it is likely to be synonymous with Hylaeochampsa and has been considered a nomen dubium by James M. Clark and Mark Norell. Clark and Norell also claimed that there is no evidence to suggest that the two genera form a true clade distinct from other eusuchians, because remains associated with Heterosuchus are to fragmentary to show any clear phylogenetic relationship. A fourth genus called Pietraroiasuchus was assigned to Hylaeochampsidae in 2011. A phylogenetic analysis conducted with the description of Pietraroiasuchus also found Pachycheilosuchus to be part of the family. In this 2011 study, Buscalioni et al. cladistically defined Hylaeochampsidae as a node-based clade of the last common ancestor of Hylaeochampsa vectiana, Iharkutosuchus makadii, Pachycheilosuchus trinquei and Pietraroiasuchus ormezzanoi and all of its descendants.

The cladogram below results from the 2011 Buscalioni et al. study:

- Eusuchia
  - - Hylaeochampsidae†
      - Hylaeochampsa vectiana†
      - - Iharkutosuchus†
        - - Pietraroiasuchus ormezzanoi†
          - Pachycheilosuchus trinquei†
    - Allodaposuchus†
  - Crocodylia

== Distribution and description ==
The family existed during the Cretaceous period in what is now Europe and the Middle East. Hylaeochampsa and its possible synonym Heterosuchus have both been found from the Vectis Formation of the Isle of Wight in England, dating back to the Barremian stage of the Early Cretaceous. Specimens of Iharkutosuchus have been found from the Csehbánya Formation in western Hungary, which was deposited during the Santonian stage of the Late Cretaceous. All hylaeochampsids had highly brevirostrine snouts and exhibited heterodonty, with large teeth concentrated posteriorly that were most likely adapted to crushing. In Iharkutosuchus these teeth were even multicusped. This is often characteristic of mammals but is highly unusual for a crocodylomorph, and suggests that the animal may have been herbivorous.
