= Pachycheilosuchus =

Pachycheilosuchus Temporal range: Early Cretaceous, 119–112 Ma

Scientific classification
- Kingdom: Animalia
- Phylum: Chordata
- Class: Reptilia
- Clade: Pseudosuchia
- Clade: Crocodylomorpha
- Clade: Neosuchia
- Clade: Eusuchia
- Family: †Hylaeochampsidae
- Genus: †Pachycheilosuchus; Rogers, 2003

Type species
- †Pachycheilosuchus trinquei Rogers, 2003

Extinct genus of reptiles

Pachycheilosuchus (meaning "thick lipped crocodile") is an extinct genus of neosuchian from the Early Cretaceous of Texas, United States. Previously known, in part, as the "Glen Rose form", this crocodylomorph is notable for its procoelous vertebrae, otherwise found only in derived eusuchian crocodilians (the vertebrae articulate with a cup on the anterior surface and a rounded posterior surface), a thick margin on the maxillae (the main tooth-bearing bones of the upper jaw; thus "thick lipped crocodile"), and a shield of armor on the neck formed by the fusion of six individual scutes.

== Description ==
Pachycheilosuchus is based on SMU 75278, a right maxilla, with the remains of at minimum 13 other individuals also known, representing most of the skeleton except hands, feet, and part of the skull. The remains were recovered near the top of the Glen Rose Formation of Erath County in central Texas, in rocks dating from the early Albian faunal stage. The fossils were found in a bonebed in a limestone rock unit, with scattered lenses of mudstone, probably deposited in a shallow, protected, nearshore brackish water setting. The type species is P. trinquei, in honor of Lance Trinque, a field assistant who helped discover and excavate the site where this animal's remains were found. This genus was named and described by Jack Rogers in 2003.

It was not a large crocodylomorph; for example, of the collected thigh bones, the longest measured only 91.2 millimeters long (3.59 in). Its body length was initially estimated at 63.5–80 centimetres (2.08–2.62 ft), using two methods. Although the remains are small, it appears that at least some of the individuals were mature, with fusion of parts of individual vertebrae. Additionally, a 49 millimeter-long (1.9 in) crocodyloid egg was recovered with the skeletal fossils, and is of reasonable size to have come from an individual with a length of 63.5 centimeters, suggesting that some of the individuals were sexually mature. A study in 2020 suggests that it may have reached up to 1.15 metres (3.8 ft) in total body length.

The maxillae had overhanging lips along their outer margins, and the tooth row was set away from the margin. One maxilla has an oval puncture mark, 5 millimeters by 6.5 millimeters (0.2 by 0.26 in), probably made by a larger predator. The snout was short and flat. The vertebrae were procoelous in the neck, back, and part of the tail, and the procoelous shape was most strongly developed in the neck vertebrae. Procoely is a type of vertebral articulation, based on the shape of the anterior and posterior faces of the vertebral centrum. In procoelous vertebrae, the vertebrae articulate with a concave leading surface and a convex posterior surface. The vertebrae of Pachycheilosuchus had a slight dimple or concavity on the posterior surface as well, making these bones different from the procoelous vertebrae that are a hallmark of derived eusuchian crocodilians. Because of this difference, and because Pachycheilosuchus did not have many of the other features of eusuchians, it probably evolved procoely independently. The ulna, the major bone of the forearm, is strongly curved. Pachycheilosuchus had among its armor a unique shield of bony scutes for its neck, composed of six individual fused scutes.

== Classification ==
Using a cladistic analysis, Rogers found that Pachycheilosuchus was most likely closest to the Atoposauridae. This clade of small crocodylomorphs is also known from the Early Cretaceous, and includes some members with procoelous vertebrae. However, a subsequent 2011 study found Pachycheilosuchus to be a member of Hylaeochampsidae, a group of basal eusuchians, as shown in the cladogram below.

- Eusuchia
  - - Hylaeochampsidae†
      - Hylaeochampsa vectiana†
      - - Iharkutosuchus†
        - - Pietraroiasuchus ormezzanoi†
          - Pachycheilosuchus trinquei†
    - Allodaposuchus†
  - Crocodylia

== The "Glen Rose Form" ==
Previously, Glen Rose crocodylomorph fossils had been known under the informal designation of the "Glen Rose Form". Fossils known under this name include a skull at the National Museum of Natural History and two partial skeletons in the Texas Vertebrate Paleontology Collections at The University of Texas at Austin, along with isolated bones. With the description of Pachycheilosuchus, it appears that the "Glen Rose Form" had been chimeric; the skull and the two skeletons lack the lipped jaw and procoelous vertebrae, and so are not Pachycheilosuchus but an undescribed form, but at least some of the isolated remains are Pachycheilosuchus. Thus, there were at least two crocodylomorphs in the Glen Rose Formation.
