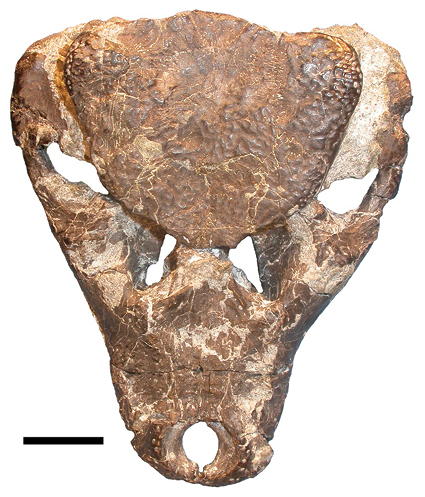
- Holotype skull
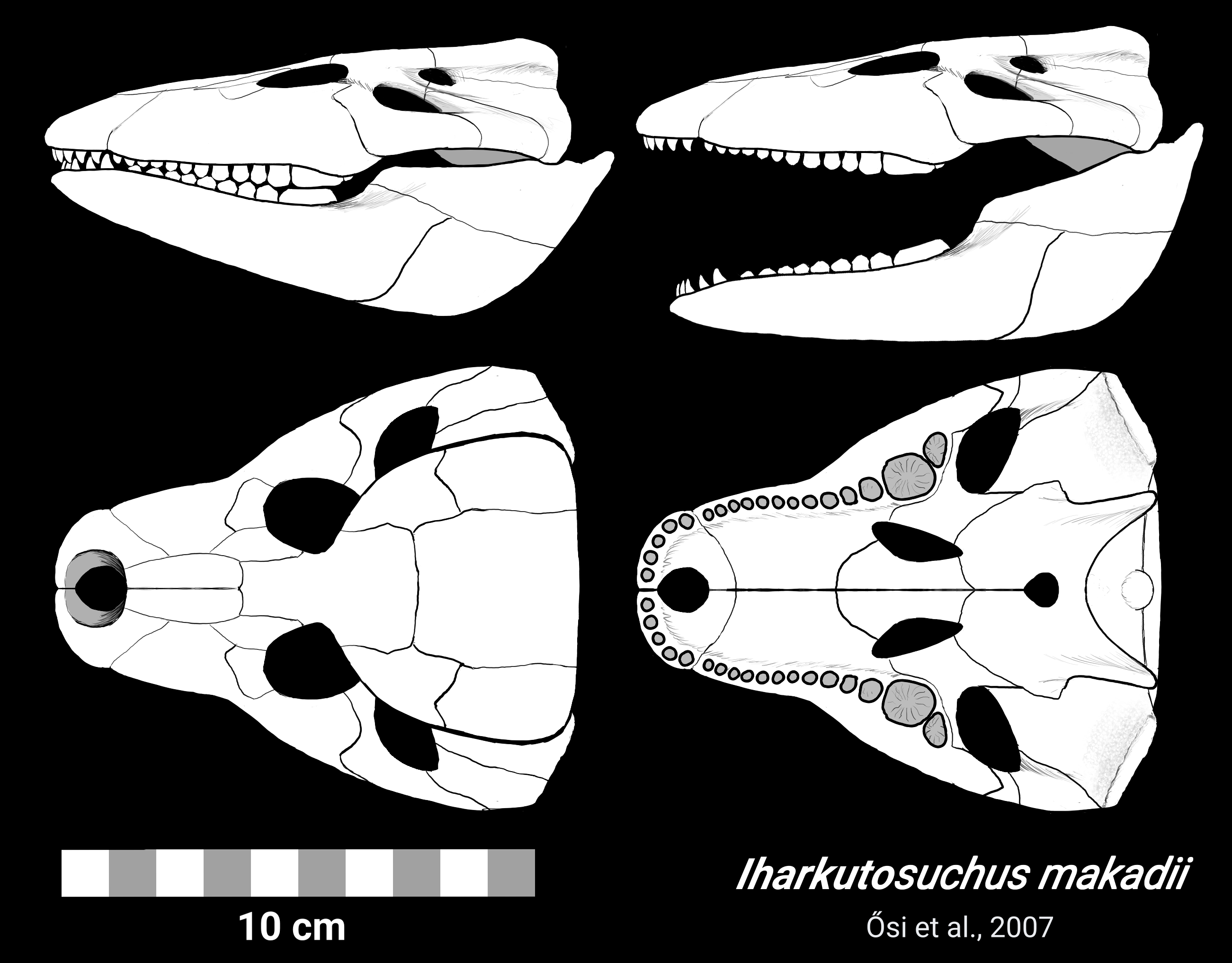
- Skull diagram

Scientific classification
- Kingdom: Animalia
- Phylum: Chordata
- Class: Reptilia
- Clade: Archosauria
- Clade: Pseudosuchia
- Clade: Crocodylomorpha
- Clade: Metasuchia
- Clade: Neosuchia
- Clade: Eusuchia
- Family: †Hylaeochampsidae
- Genus: †Iharkutosuchus; Ősi et al., 2007

Type species
- †Iharkutosuchus makadii Ősi et al., 2007

= Iharkutosuchus =

Iharkutosuchus Temporal range: Late Cretaceous, Santonian 86.3–83.6 Ma

Extinct genus of reptiles

Iharkutosuchus ("Iharkút crocodile", after where it was found) is an extinct genus of basal eusuchian crocodyliform. Its fossils have been found in the Santonian-aged (Late Cretaceous) Csehbánya Formation in the Bakony Mountains of western Hungary.

== Description ==
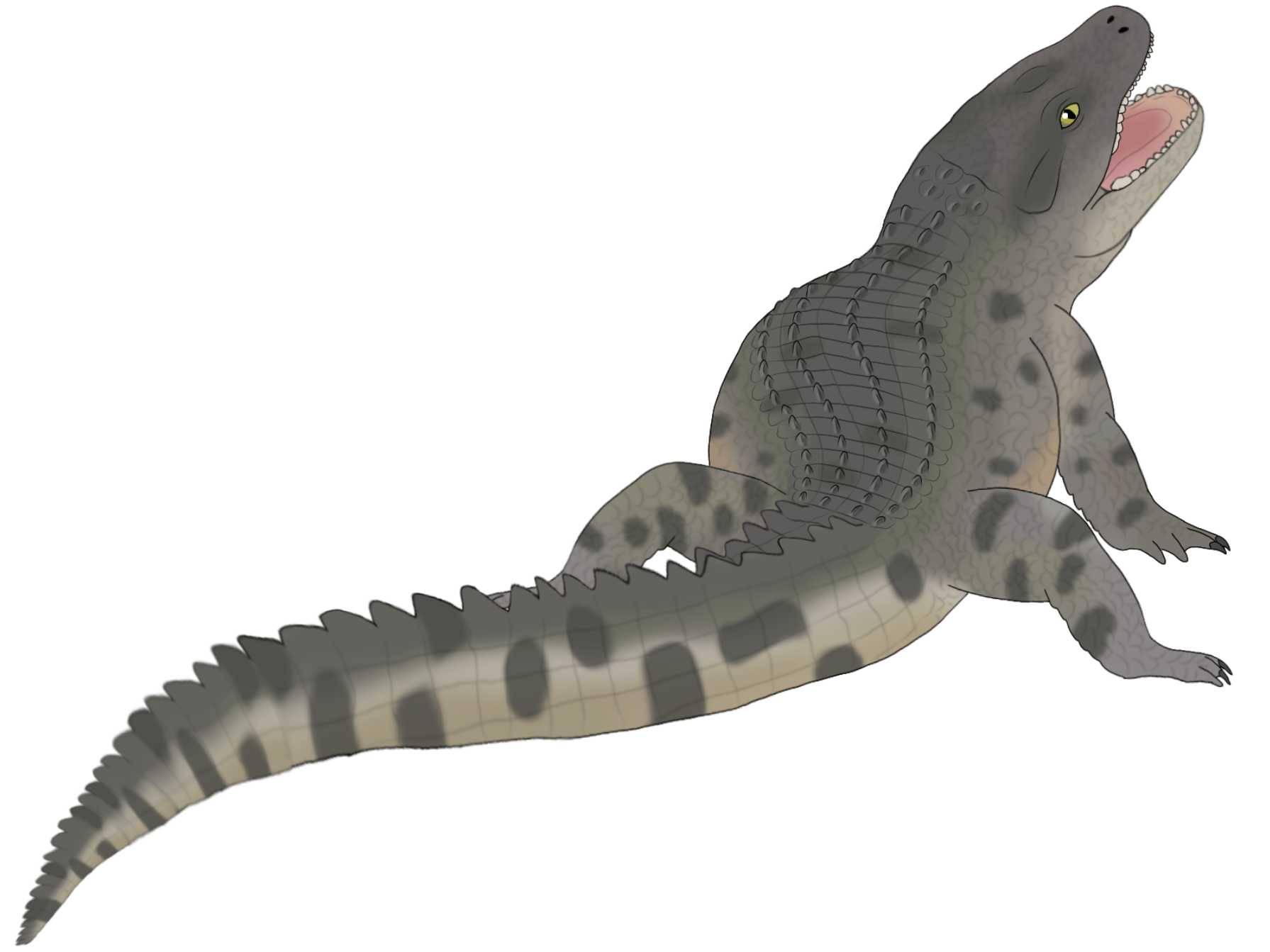
Life reconstruction

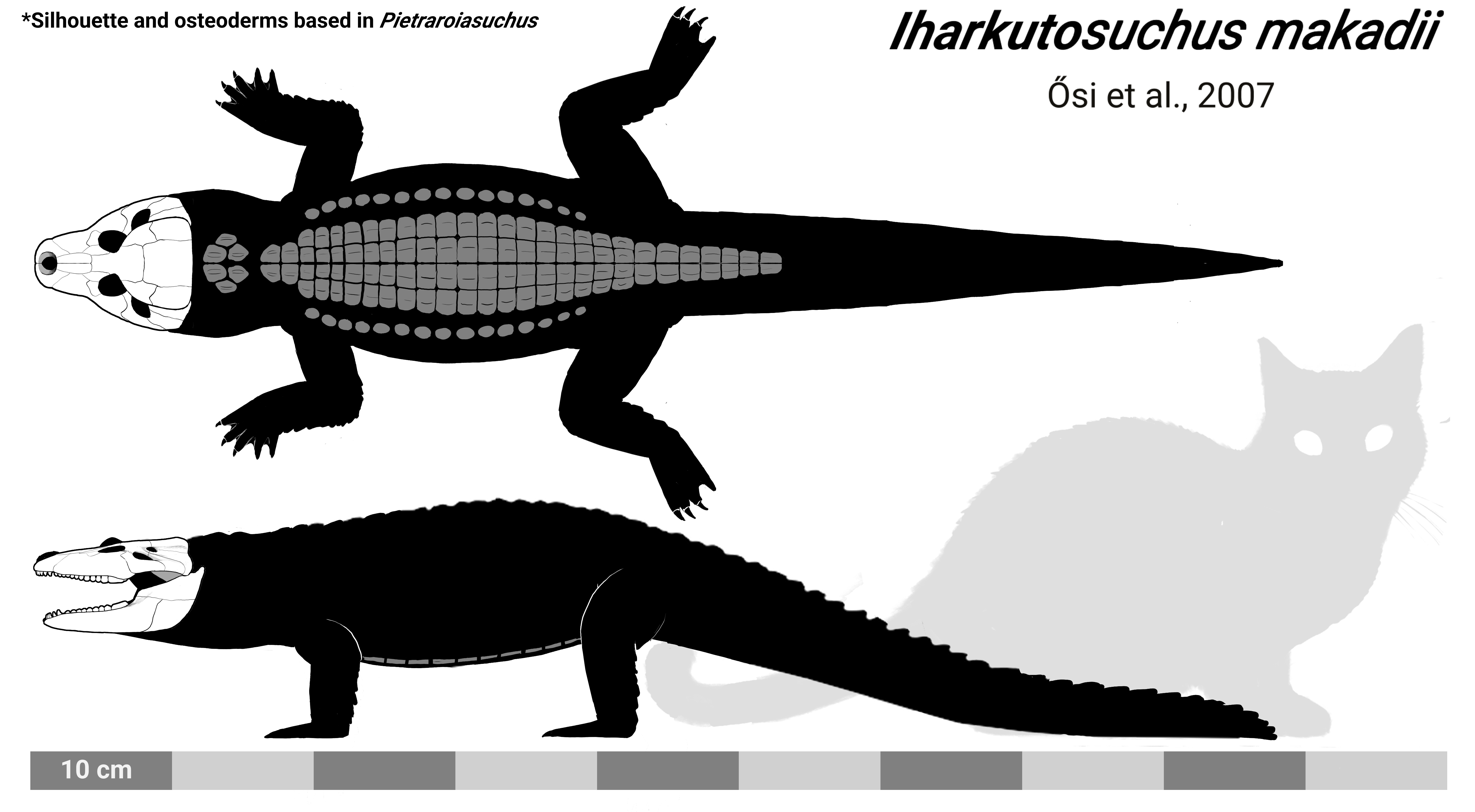
Hypothetical size comparison of Iharkutosuchus to a cat, with silhouette and osteoderms based on Pietraroiasuchus

Iharkutosuchus is based on MTM 2006.52.1, a nearly complete skull, but several other partial skulls, isolated skull bones, and numerous teeth are also known. It was a small crocodyliform, with a skull length up to 11.1 centimetres (4.4 in), and estimated body length of 80 centimetres (2.6 ft). Its skull was low, and the snout was short. Iharkutosuchus is unusual in its heterodonty: some of its teeth were complex and multicusped, like mammal teeth. The structure of the skull indicates that it could grind food with a mobile lower jaw, an inference corroborated by the extensive horizontal wear facets on its teeth, and together with the teeth suggest a diet of fibrous plant material. The enamel structure of Iharkutosuchus was convergent with mammalian Hunter-Schreger bands, suggesting a similar evolutionary pressure caused it to develop traits for efficient mastication.

== Classification ==
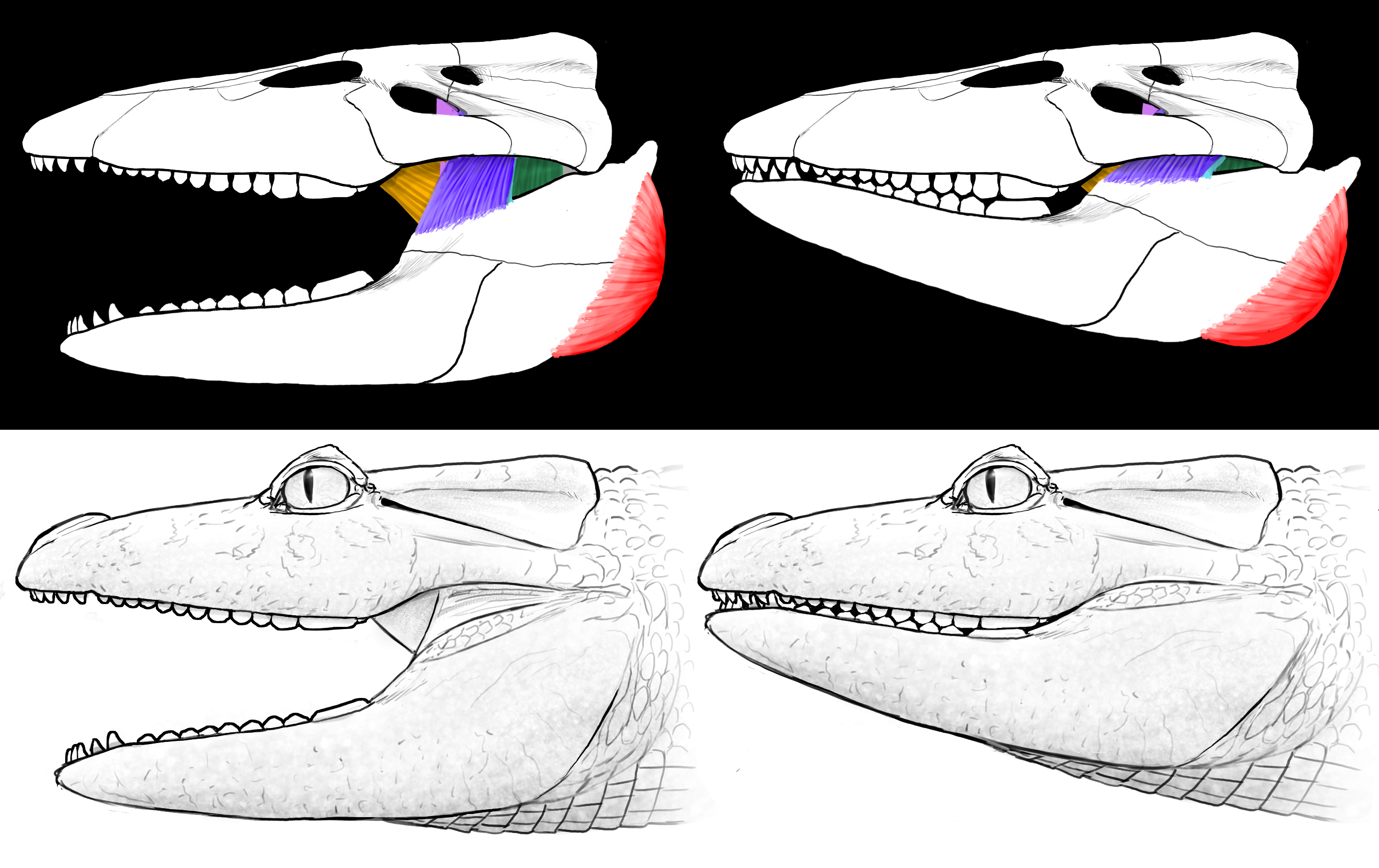
Top: Jaw musculature diagram, based on Ősi & Weishampel (2009). Bottom: Life reconstruction

The genus was described in 2007 by Attila Ősi and colleagues. The type species is I. makadii, named for László Makádi. A 2011 phylogenetic study recovered Iharkutosuchus as a member of the Hylaeochampsidae, a group of basal eusuchians, as shown in the cladogram below.

- Eusuchia
  - - Hylaeochampsidae
      - Hylaeochampsa
      - - Iharkutosuchus
        - - Pietraroiasuchus
          - Pachycheilosuchus
    - Allodaposuchus
  - Crocodylia
