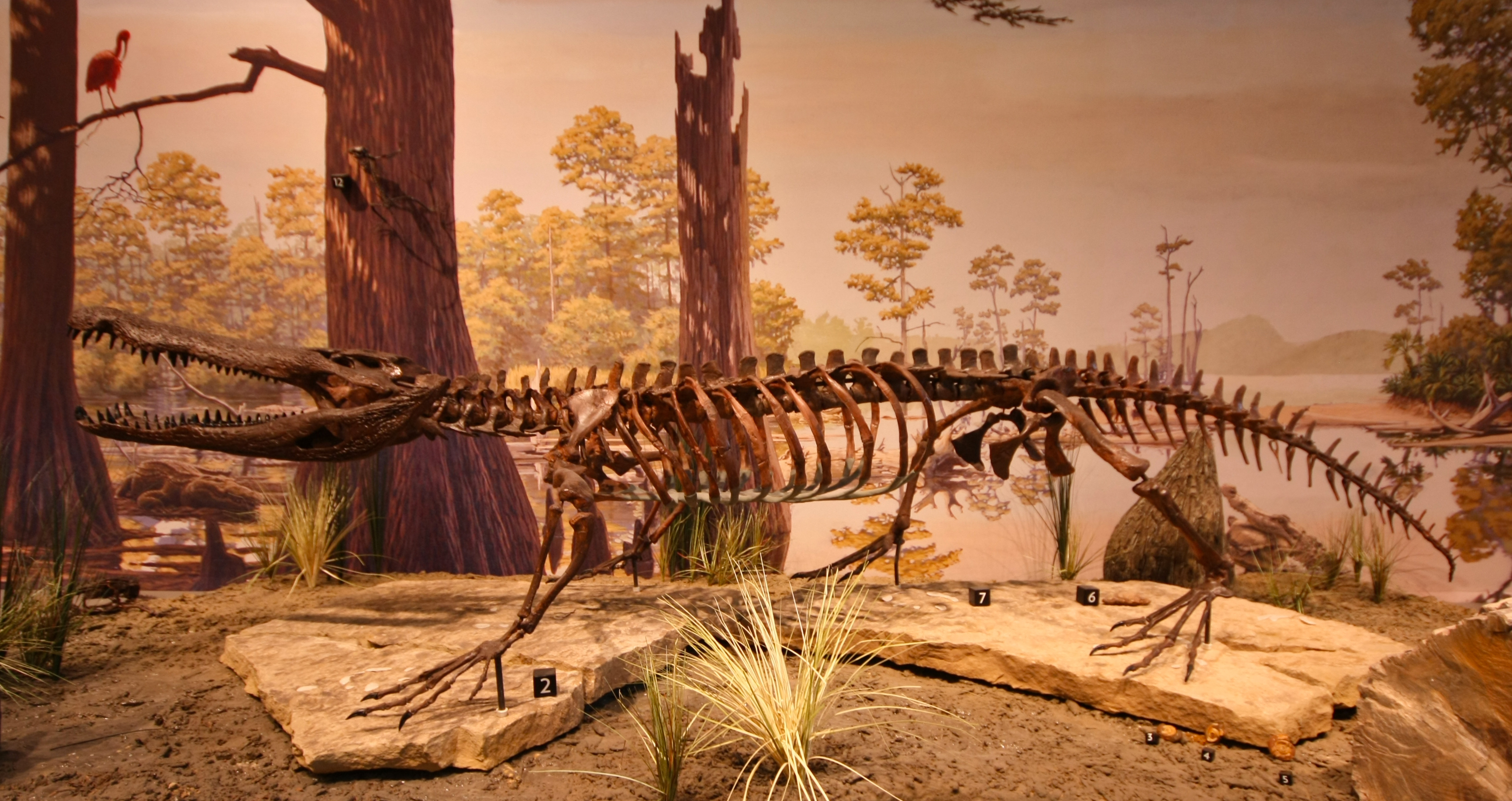
- Skeleton cast at the North Dakota Heritage Center & State Museum

Scientific classification
- Kingdom: Animalia
- Phylum: Chordata
- Class: Reptilia
- Clade: Pseudosuchia
- Clade: Crocodylomorpha
- Clade: Eusuchia
- Genus: †Borealosuchus; Brochu, 1997

Type species
- Leidyosuchus sternbergii (Gilmore, 1910)

Species
- see text

= Borealosuchus =

Borealosuchus Temporal range: Late Cretaceous - Eocene, 70.6–47.8 Ma
- Skeletal reconstruction of B. griffithi

Extinct genus of reptiles

Borealosuchus (meaning "northern crocodile") is an extinct genus of crocodyliforms that lived from the Late Cretaceous to the Eocene in North America. It was named by Christopher Brochu in 1997 for several species that had been assigned to Leidyosuchus. The species assigned to it are: B. sternbergii, the type species, from the Maastrichtian (Late Cretaceous) of Colorado, Montana, North Dakota, South Dakota, and Wyoming; B. acutidentatus, from the Paleocene of Saskatchewan; B. formidabilis, from the Paleocene of North Dakota; B. griffithi, from the Paleocene of Alberta; and B. wilsoni, from the Eocene of Wyoming. B. formidabilis is particularly well-known, represented by the remains of many individuals from the Wannagan Creek site in North Dakota. An indeterminate species is known from the Late Cretaceous Demopolis Chalk in Alabama.

The genus is characterized by square, overlapping dorsal osteoderms that did not possess any raised keels. The limb-bones are usually very slender, and the 3rd-4th dentary alveoli of the lower jaw were large and paired together, as also were the 4th and 5th maxillary teeth on the upper jaw.

Borealosuchus was a mid-sized crocodyliform, with B. wilsoni measuring approximately 3.2–4.5 metres (10–15 ft) long.

== Taxonomy ==
Six species of Borealosuchus are currently recognized. In order of their naming, they are B. sternbergii, B. acutidentatus, B. wilsoni, B. formidabilis, B. griffithi, and B. threeensis. Four of these species (B. sternbergi, B. acutidentatus, B. wilsoni, and B. formidabilis) were originally named as species of Leidyosuchus. A sixth species of Borealosuchus, B. threeensis, was named in 2012. Fossils of this species were found in the Inversand Company Marl Pit of Gloucester County, New Jersey. The specific name is a reference to Exit 3 of the New Jersey Turnpike, which is the closest highway exit to the type locality. The authors of the paper describing B. threeensis noted that the name is "in reference to a question every New Jersey resident encounters when traveling: 'Oh, you're from New Jersey? Which exit?'".

- †B. sternbergii (Gilmore, 1910)
  - Moved from Leidyosuchus sternbergii
- †B. acutidentatus (Sternberg, 1932)
  - Moved from L. acutidentatus
- †B. formidabilis (Erickson, 1976)
  - Moved from L. formidabilis
- †B. griffithi Wu, Brinkman, and Fox, 2001
- †B. threeensis Brochu et al., 2012
- †B. wilsoni (Mook, 1959)
  - Moved from L. wilsoni

== Classification ==
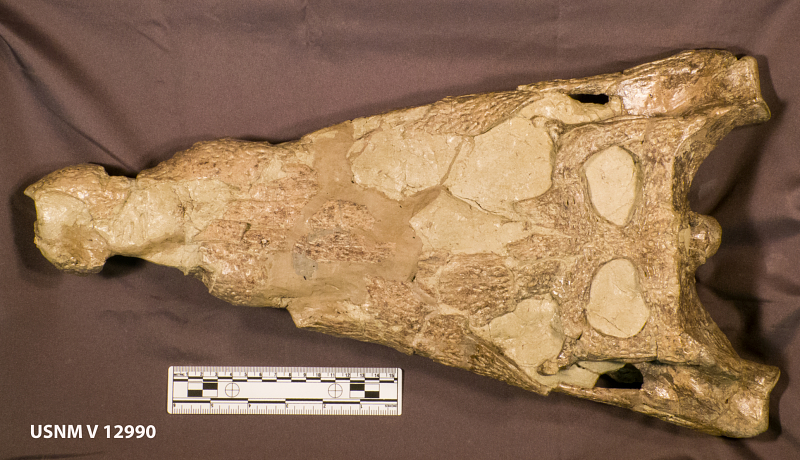
Skull of B. wilsoni in the Smithsonian Institution

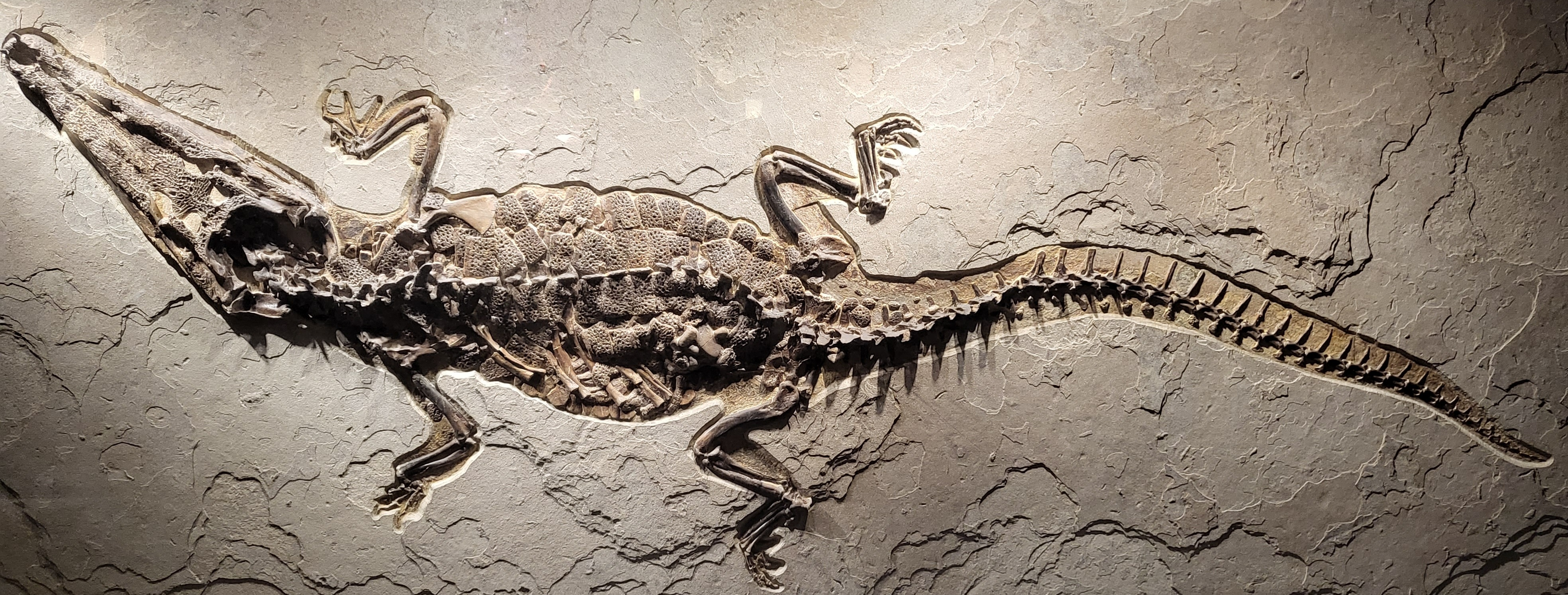
Borealosuchus wilsoni at the Houston Museum of Natural Science

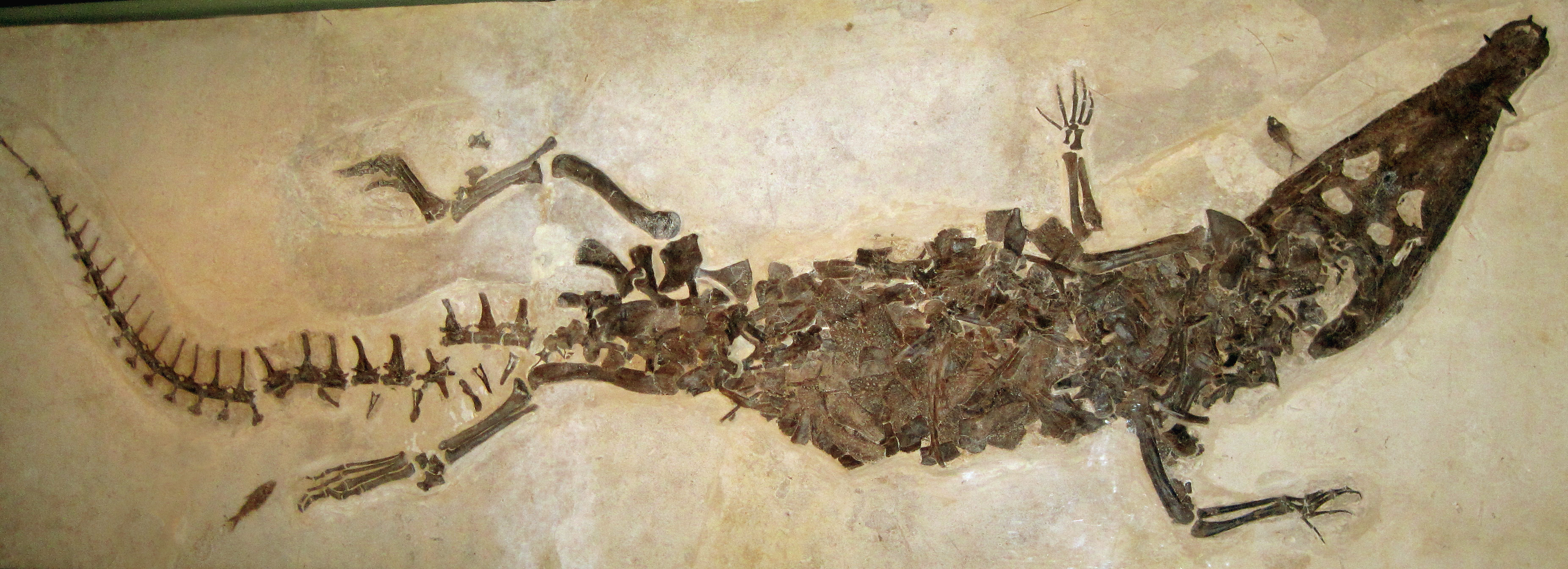
Skeleton of B. wilsoni in the Field Museum of Natural History

Although some earlier phylogenetic studies proposed Borealosuchus to be a member of Crocodylia, recent studies are now recovering Borealosuchus as a basal eusuchian not belonging to Crocodylia, as shown in the cladogram below:

- Eusuchia
  - † Hylaeochampsa
  - - † Allodaposuchidae
    - - † Borealosuchus
        - † B. sternbergii
        - - - † B. acutidentatus
            - † B. formidabilis
          - - † B. threensis
            - † B. wilsoni
      - Crocodylia
        - Alligatoridae
          - Caimaninae
            - - Caiman
              - Melanosuchus
            - Paleosuchus
          - Alligatorinae
            Alligator
        - Longirostres
          - Crocodylidae
            - Crocodylus
            - - Mecistops
              - Osteolaemus
          - Gavialidae
            - Gavialis
            - Tomistoma
