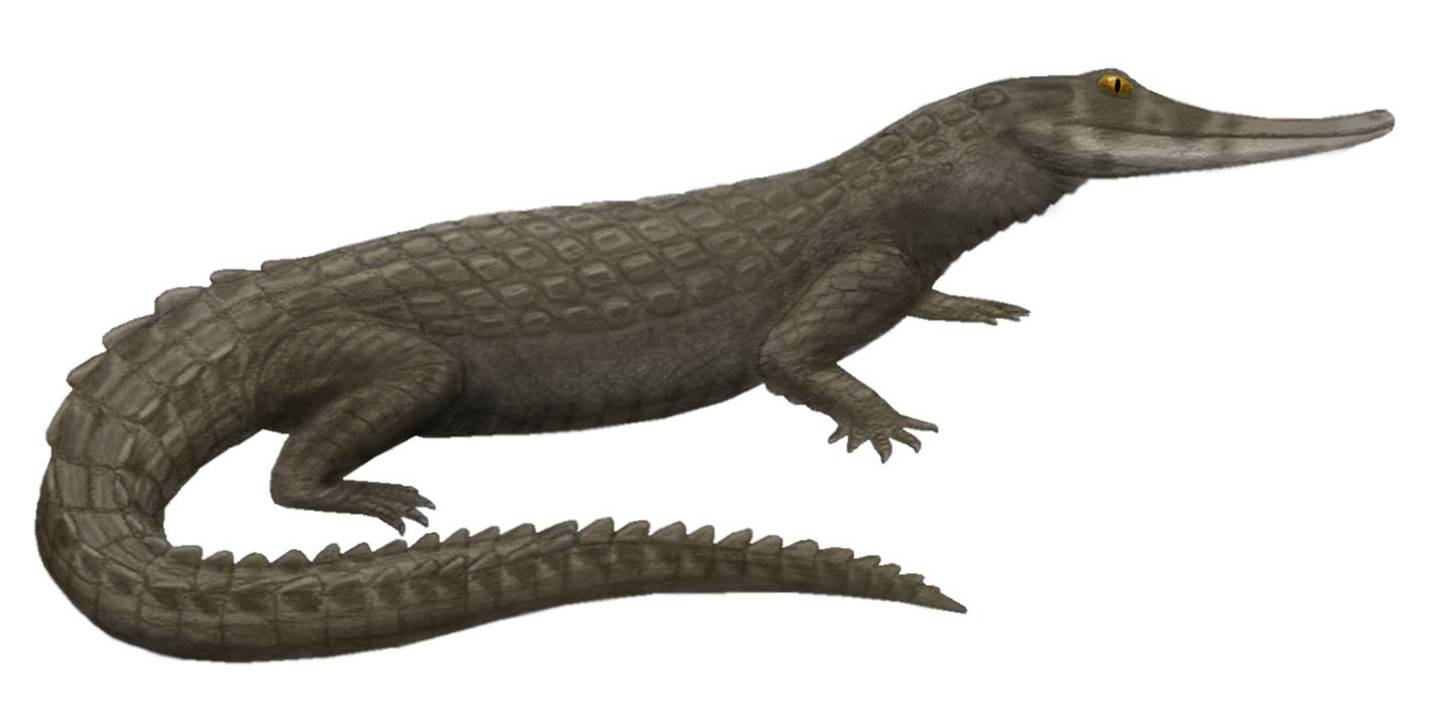
- Restoration of I. duncani

Scientific classification
- Kingdom: Animalia
- Phylum: Chordata
- Class: Reptilia
- Clade: Pseudosuchia
- Clade: Crocodylomorpha
- Clade: Neosuchia
- Genus: †Isisfordia; Salisbury et al. 2006

Type species
- †Isisfordia duncani Salisbury et al. 2006

Other species
- †I. selaslophensis (Etheridge, 1917) Hart, 2020; †I. molnari Hart et al., 2019

Synonyms
- Bottosaurus selaslophensis Etheridge, 1917; Crocodylus selaslophensis Etheridge, 1917

= Isisfordia =

Isisfordia Temporal range: Middle Cretaceous: Albian-Cenomanian, 106.8–97.2 Ma

Extinct genus of reptiles

Isisfordia is an extinct genus of crocodyliform closely related to crocodilians that lived in Australia during the Middle Cretaceous (Albian–Cenomanian).

== Description ==
The type species, I. duncani. (named after the discoverer; former Deputy Mayor of Isisford, Ian Duncan) was discovered in the Winton Formation in Isisford, Queensland, Australia in the mid-1990s. Most of the animal was discovered, with the exception of the front portion of the skull. On a later expedition to the location, paleontologists discovered a complete skull which differed from the original specimen in size only.

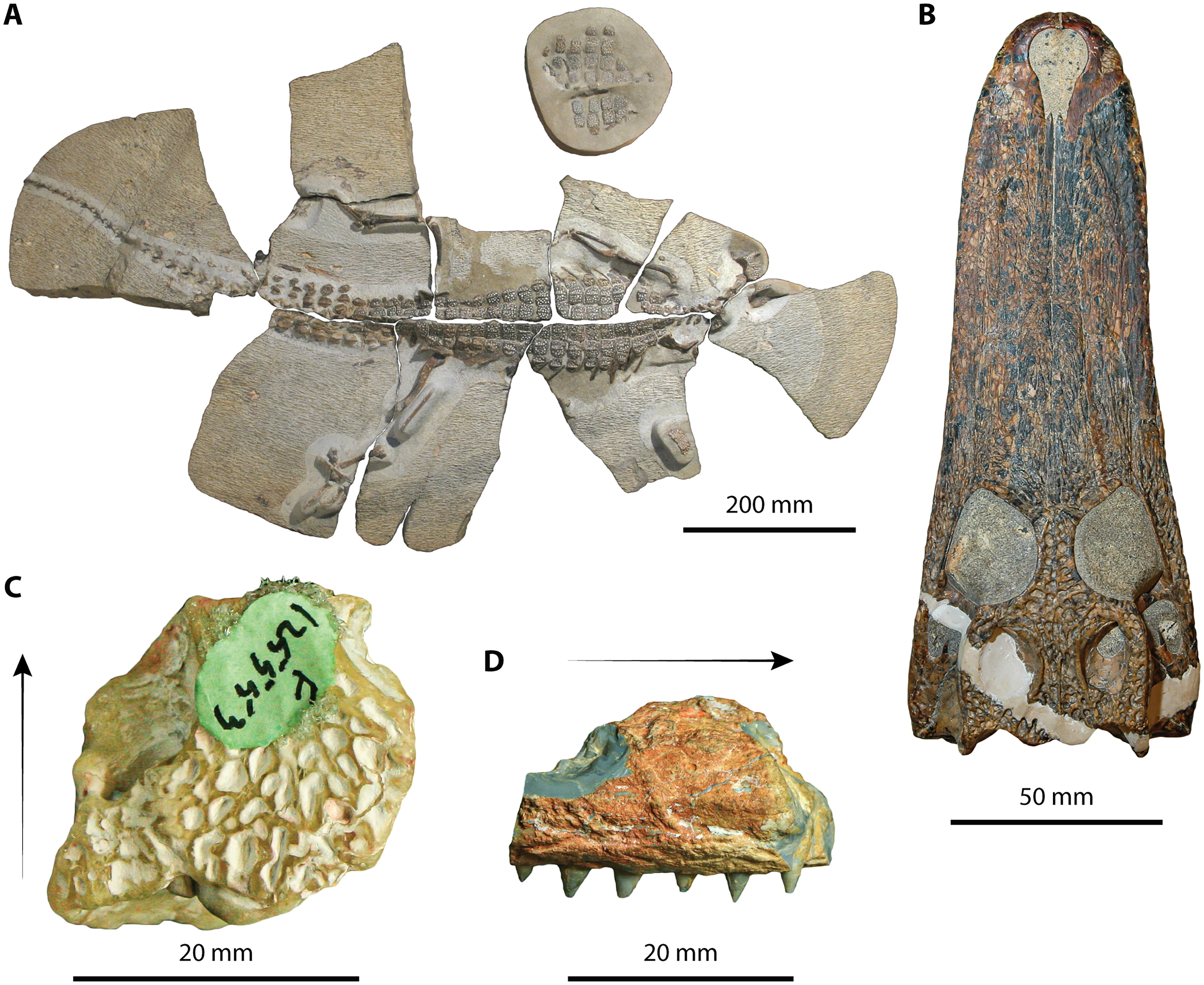
I. duncani (A, B), I. molnari (C) and I. selaslophensis (D)

A second species I. molnari was named in 2019 from a braincase found in the Griman Creek Formation near Lightning Ridge, and the nominal species Crocodylus (Bottosaurus) selaslophensis Etheridge, 1917, based on a maxillary fragment from the same unit, was referred to I. molnari.

Later however, Hart (2020) noted that the selaslophensis holotype didn't overlap with that of AM F125553, so he retained Etheridge's species as a distinct species, I. selaslophensis, even though he raised the possibility that molnari could be synonymous with selaslophensis.

The estimated body length of Isisfordia is over 1 metre (3.3 ft).

== Relation to modern day crocodilians ==
Segmentation of dorsal osteoderms over time in advanced neosuchians (Isisfordia third from left).

The discovery of the fossilized remains led paleontologists to suggest that the group including modern crocodilians first evolved 30 million years earlier than previously thought, during the Cretaceous period on the supercontinent Gondwana. Analysis of the remains concluded that the vertebrae fit together as they do in modern crocodilians, via loose ball-and-socket joints, as well as a secondary palate similar to that in living crocodilians which allows them to let air pass into the lungs without entering the inside of the mouth.

A cladistic analysis by Turner and Pritchard (2015) recovers Isisfordia with Susisuchus in a monophyletic Susisuchidae as a non-eusuchian neosuchian more derived than Dyrosauridae, but more primitive than Goniopholididae. A 2021 study by Rio and Mannion confirmed the placement of Isisfordia outside of Eusuchia, as the sister taxon to Paralligatoridae.
