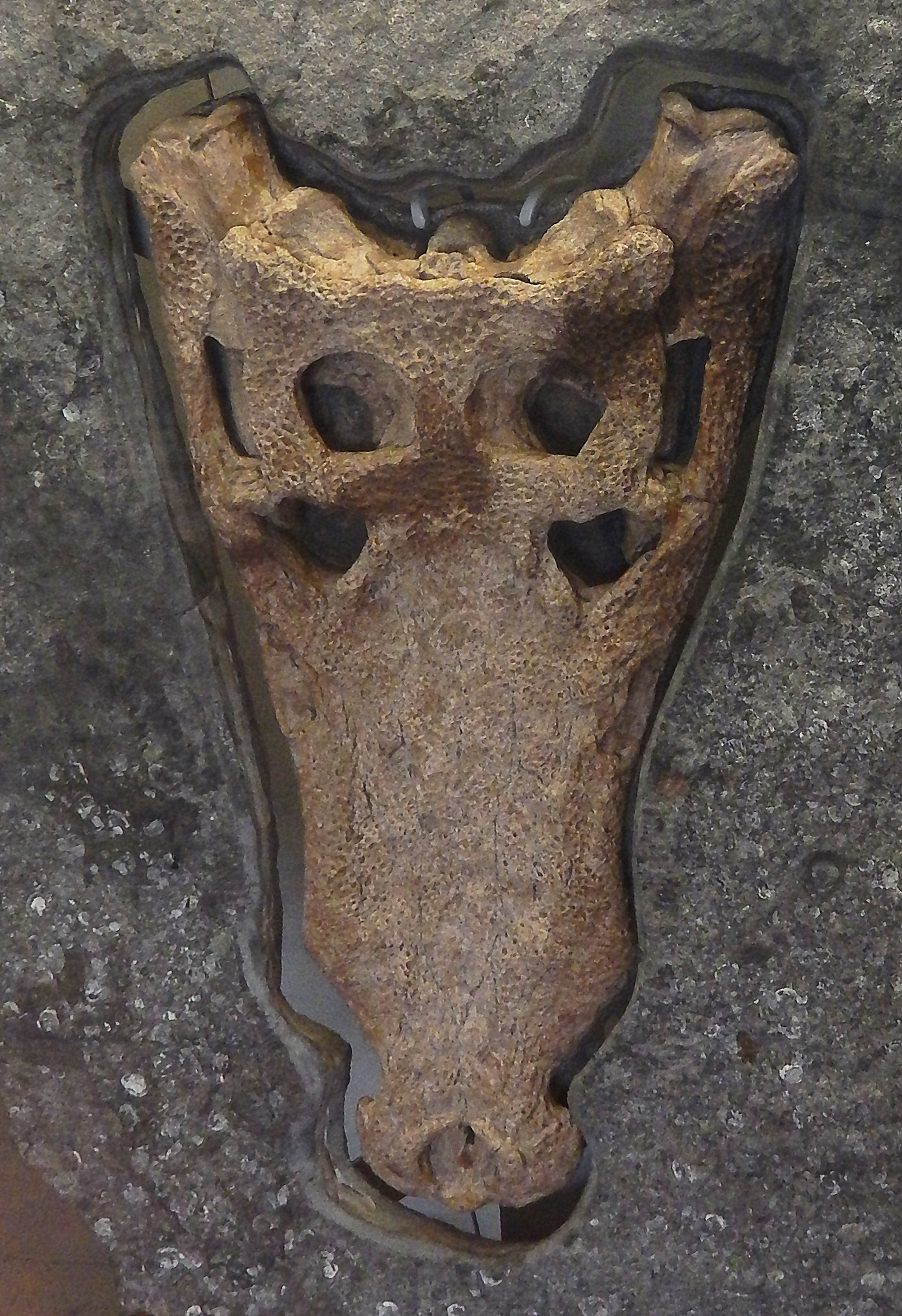
- Holotype skull of the "Swanage Crocodile", G. kiplingi on display at the Dorset Museum. Berriasian age (earliest Cretaceous).

Scientific classification
- Kingdom: Animalia
- Phylum: Chordata
- Class: Reptilia
- Clade: Pseudosuchia
- Clade: Crocodylomorpha
- Family: †Goniopholididae
- Genus: †Goniopholis; Owen, 1841

Type species
- †Goniopholis crassidens Owen, 1841

Species
- †G. baryglyphaeus Schwarz, 2002; †G. crassidens Owen, 1841; †G. kiplingi Andrade et al., 2011; †G. simus Owen, 1878

= Goniopholis =

Goniopholis Temporal range: Late Jurassic - Early Cretaceous, 155–139.8 Ma

Extinct genus of reptiles

Goniopholis (meaning "angled scale") is an extinct genus of goniopholidid crocodyliform that lived in Europe and North America during the Late Jurassic and Early Cretaceous. Like other goniopholidids, it resembled living crocodilians, and probably had a similar ecology as semi-aquatic ambush predators.

== Discovery and species ==
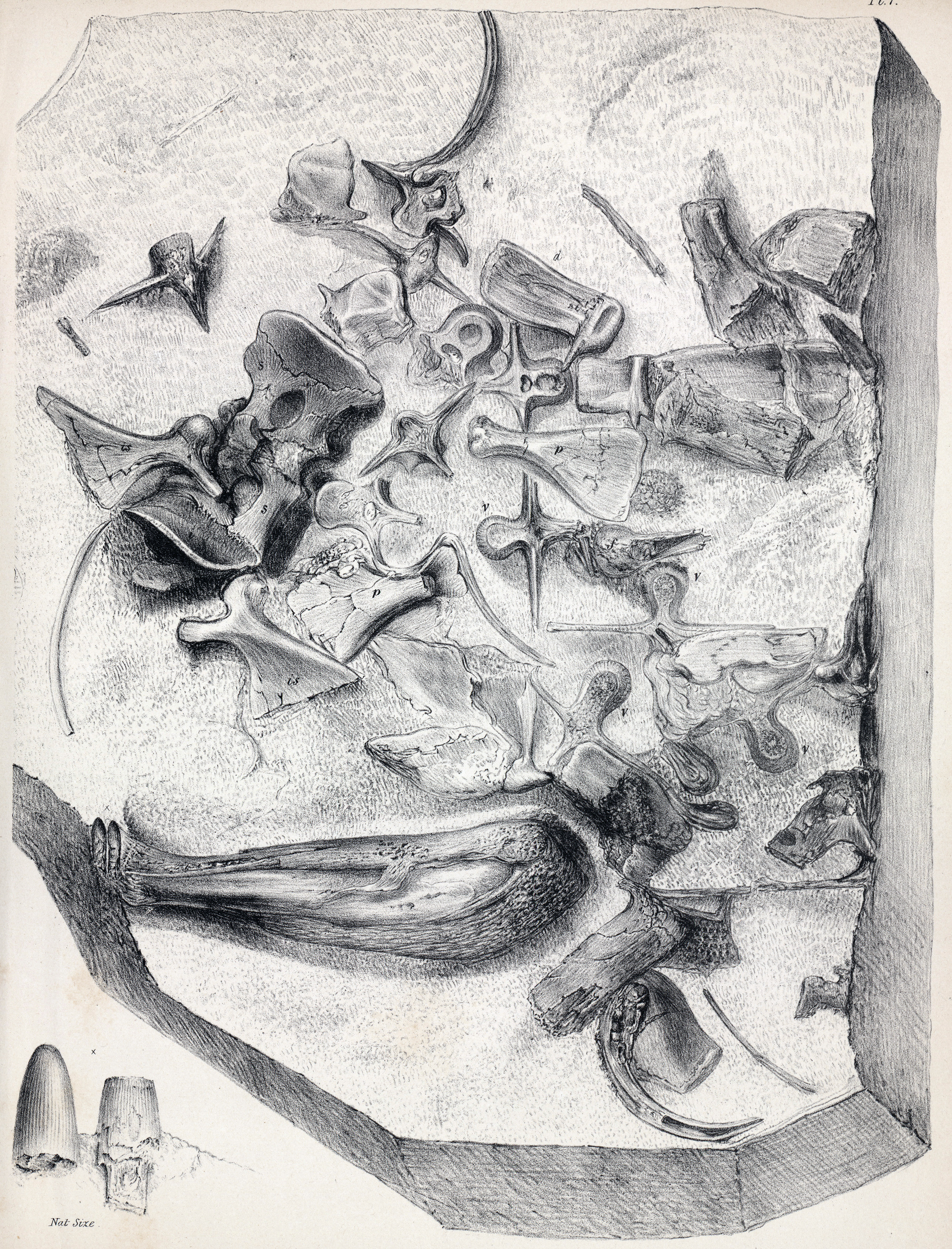
G. crassidens holotype BMNH 3798

The type species of the genus is G. crassidens which is known from the Berriasian of England, and the referable species G. simus from the Berriasian of NW Germany, might be conspecific. Other species that are referable to Goniopholis include G. kiplingi from the Berriasian of England, and G. baryglyphaeus from the Late Jurassic (Kimmeridgian) of Portugal making it the oldest known Goniopholis species. The species G. kiplingi honors the author Rudyard Kipling, "in recognition for his enthusiasm for natural sciences". G. kiplingi had skull reaching 475.6 mm (18.72 in), it is one of the largest goniopholidid along with Amphicotylus milesi which had skull reaching 43 cm (17 in). Based on skull length, total body length of G. kiplingi is estimated at 3.47 m (11.4 ft).

Eggs attributed to Goniopholis were found in the Late Jurassic of Portugal.

A partial skeleton of an indeterminate species of Goniopholis has been recovered from the Berriasian aged Angeac-Charente bonebed of France.

Goniopholis have been inferred to have been ectothermic on the basis of bone histology and stable isotope analysis.

The taxon Macellodus brodei was named in 1854 by Sir Richard Owen for a partial maxilla and referred jaws, with Owen interpreting the material as that of a lizard. The maxilla was considered missing my Hoffstetter in 1967, who designated a neotype, though this neotype was then removed from Macellodus and referred to the lacertilian Becklesisaurus. Review by Richard Estes in 1983 rediscovered the type of Macellodus among crocodilian remains in the Natural History Museum, London, recognizing that it belonged to the premaxilla of a crocodilian. Estes considered that Macellodus should be a synyonym of Goniopholis, and G. brodei would have priority over G. simus, but instead of advocating for synonymy Estes found that G. brodei is undiagnostic.

=== Formerly assigned species ===
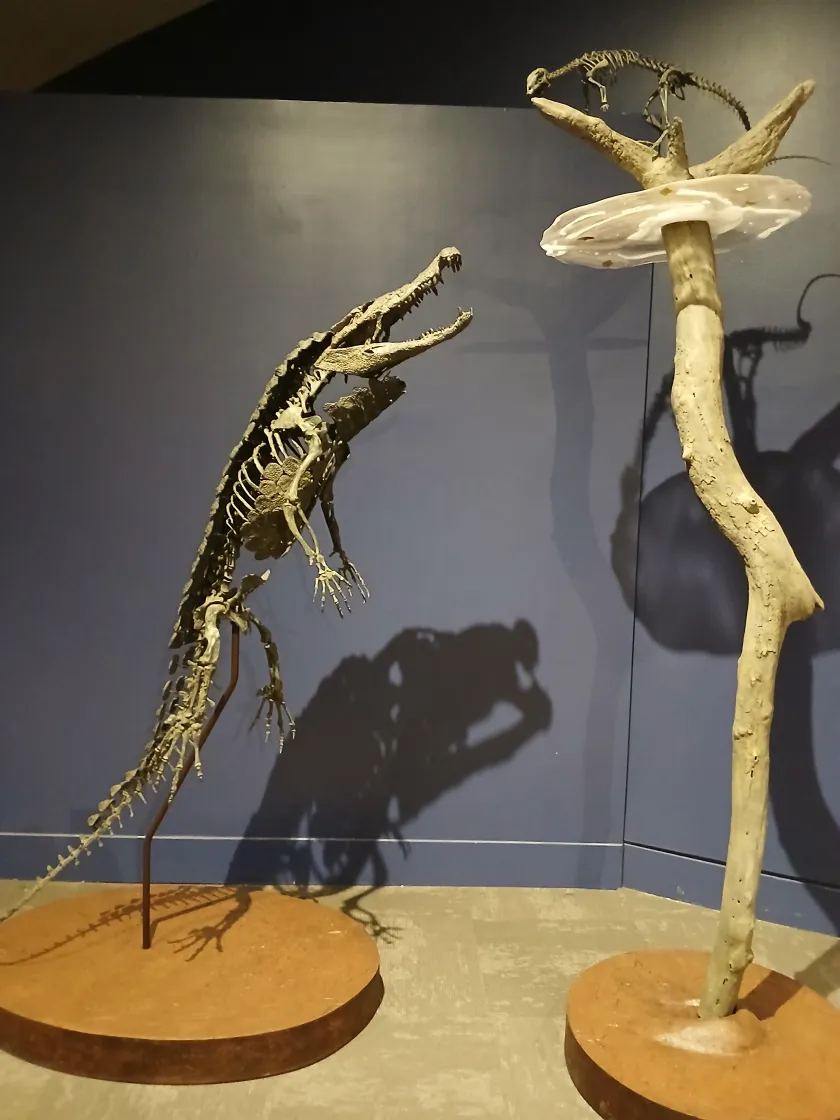
A skeletal mount of Goniopholis stalking a juvenile Dryosaurus

Two species were referred to Goniopholis from Brazil. Goniopholis hartti from the Lower Cretaceous of Brazil is in fact a member of the genus Sarcosuchus. G. paulistanus, based on two tooth crowns and a disassociated fragment of the right tibia from the Upper Cretaceous Bauru Group, has been reassigned to Itasuchidae and given its own genus Roxochampsa.

From North America, G. lucasii and G. kirtlandicus are currently placed in their own genera Amphicotylus and Denazinosuchus, respectively, while G. felix, G. gilmorei, and G. stovalli, all from the Morrison Formation, are referable to Amphicotylus and closely related to Eutretauranosuchus which are known from the same formation.

G. phuwiangensis is known from NE Thailand, but this species is fragmentary and was recently reassigned to Sunosuchus or to Siamosuchus. Nannosuchus from the Early Cretaceous (Berriasian stage) of England and Spain currently considered to be valid, was referred to as G. gracilidens by some authors.

Willett's / Hulke's, Hooley's and Dollo's goniopholidids represent several complete specimens previously classified as either G. simus or G. crassidens, and one of them was recently re-described as the new species, G. willetti. More recently these specimens were removed from Goniopholis, and two of them, Hooley's and Hulke's goniopholidids, have been already reassigned to their own genera Anteophthalmosuchus and Hulkepholis, respectively. Dollo's goniopholidid has also been assigned to Anteophthalmosuchus.

Koumpiodontosuchus aprosdokiti from England was initially identified as a juvenile Goniopholis.

== Description ==
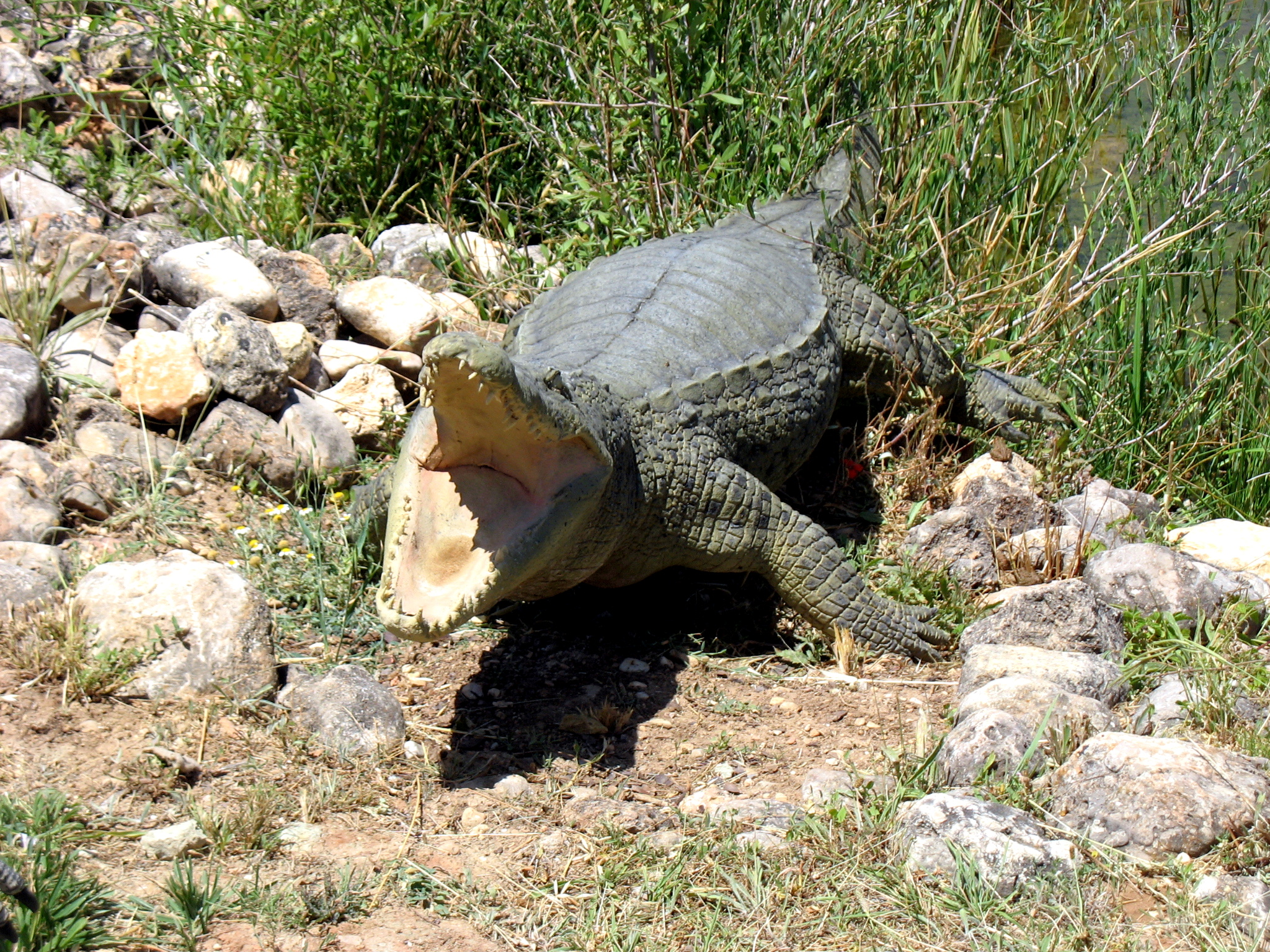
Model of Goniopholis at the Castilla-La Mancha Paleontological Museum

Like other goniophoilids, Goniopholis bears a superficial resemblance to modern crocodilians. However, unlike modern crocodilians and like other goniopholidids, the dermal armour covering the back was composed of two rows of large rectangular scutes running parallel down each side of the midline, with a "peg and groove" mechanism articulating the sets of plates together, with the outer edge of the plates deflected downwards.

== Ecology ==
Goniopholidids likely had a similar ecology to modern crocodilians as semi-aquatic ambush predators.

== Classification ==
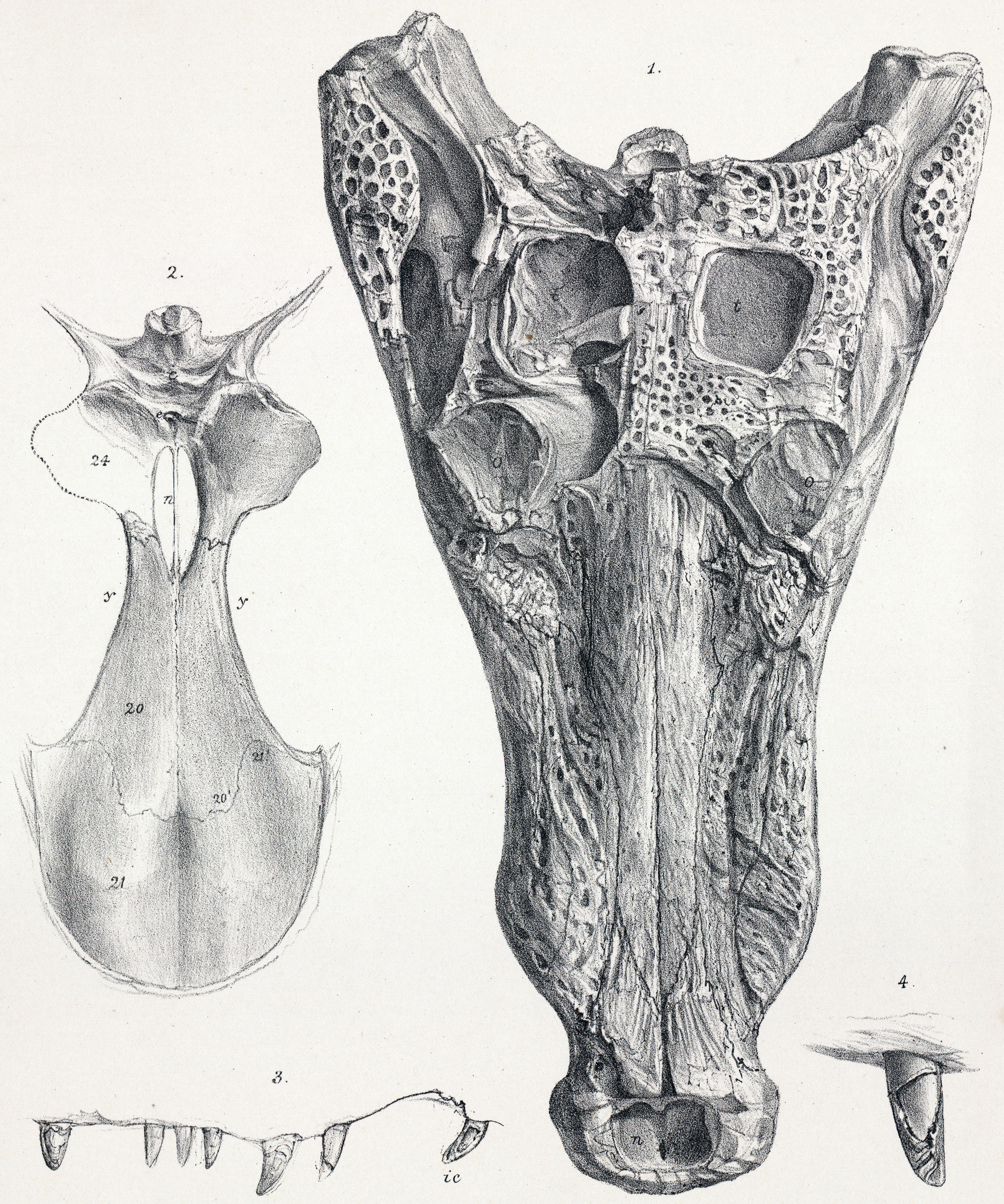
G. simus skull from Middle Purbeck Group

Below is a cladogram including several Goniopholis species:

- Neosuchia
  - Atoposauridae
    - Theriosuchus pusillus
    - Theriosuchus guimarotae
  - - - Rugosuchus
      - - Bernissartia
        - Eusuchia
    - - Stolokrosuchus
      - - - Tethysuchia
          - Thalattosuchia
        - Goniopholididae
          - Calsoyasuchus valliceps
          - - - "Goniopholis" phuwiangensis
              - - Eutretauranosuchus delfi
                - "Sunosuchus" junggarensis
              - - Sunosuchus miaoi
                - Sunosuchus thailandicus
            - - Siamosuchus phuphokensis
              - - Amphicotylus lucasii
                - - Denazinosuchus kirtlandicus
                  - Nannosuchus gracilidens
                  - - - Hulkepholis (Hulke's goniopholidid)
                      - - Anteophthalmosuchus (Hooley's goniopholidid)
                        - Anteophthalmosuchus (Dollo's goniopholidid)
                    - Goniopholis
                      - Goniopholis baryglyphaeus
                      - - Goniopholis kiplingi
                        - Goniopholis simus

== Sources ==
- Buffetaut, E; Ingavat, R (1983). "Goniopholis phuwiangensis nov. sp., a new mesosuchian crocodile from the Mesozoic of North-eastern Thailand". Geobios. 16 (1): 79–91. doi:10.1016/S0016-6995(83)80048-5.
- Holland, W. J. (1905). "A new crocodile from the Jurassic of Wyoming". Annals of the Carnegie Museum. 3 (3): 431–434. ISSN 0097-4463.
- Mook, C. C. (1964). "New species of Goniopholis from the Morrison of Oklahoma". Oklahoma Geology Notes. 24: 283–287. ISSN 0030-1736.
- Owen, R. 1878. Monograph on The Fossil Reptilia of the Wealden and Purbeck Formations, Supplement no. VII. Crocodilia (Goniopholis, Pterosuchus, and Suchosaurus). Palaeontological Society Monograph, p. 1-15.
- Owen, R. (1879). "On the Association of dwarf crocodiles (Nanosuchus and Theriosuchus pusilus, e. g.) with the diminutive mammals of the Purbeck Shales". Quarterly Journal of the Geological Society of London. 35 (1–4): 148–155. doi:10.1144/GSL.JGS.1879.035.01-04.02. S2CID 129650812.
- Salisbury, S. W.; Willis, P. M. A.; Peitz, S. & Sander, P. M. (December 1999). "The crocodilian Goniopholis simus from the Lower Cretaceous of north-western Germany". Special Papers in Palaeontology. 60: 121–148. ISBN 978-0-901702-67-8.
- Schwarz, Daniela (2002). "A new species of Goniopholis from the Upper Jurassic of Portugal". Palaeontology. 45 (1): 185–208. doi:10.1111/1475-4983.00233.
