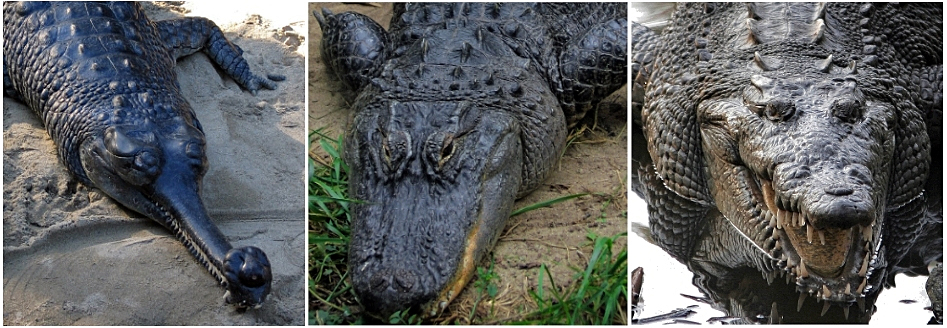
- Three species of living eusuchian: gharial (left), American alligator (center), and American crocodile (right).

Scientific classification
- Kingdom: Animalia
- Phylum: Chordata
- Class: Reptilia
- Clade: Pseudosuchia
- Clade: Crocodylomorpha
- Clade: Neosuchia
- Clade: Eusuchia; Huxley, 1875

Subgroups
- †Borealosuchus
- †Confractosuchus
- †Deinosuchus
- †Diplocynodon
- †Leidyosuchus
- †Portugalosuchus
- †Aegyptosuchidae
- †Allodaposuchidae
- †Hylaeochampsidae
- †Planocraniidae
- Crocodylia
- †"Thoracosaurs"
  - †Argochampsa
  - †Eogavialis
  - †Eosuchus
  - †Eothoracosaurus
  - †Thoracosaurus
Possible Members
- †Isisfordia
- †Susisuchus
- †Titanochampsa
- †Atoposauridae
- †Bernissartiidae
- †Paralligatoridae

= Eusuchia =

Eusuchia Temporal range: Early Cretaceous - Recent, 130–0 Ma

Clade of reptiles

Eusuchia is a clade of neosuchian crocodylomorphs that first appeared in the Early Cretaceous, which includes modern crocodilians. Along with Dyrosauridae and Sebecosuchia, they were the only crocodyliformes known to have survived the K-Pg extinction.

== Definition ==
Eusuchia was originally defined by Thomas Henry Huxley in 1875 as an apomorphy-based group, meaning that it was defined by shared characteristics rather than relations. These characteristics include pterygoid-bounded choanae and vertebrae which are procoelous (concave from the front and convex from the back). The possibility that these traits may have been convergently evolved in different groups of neosuchians rather than one lineage spurred some modern paleontologists to revise the group's definition to make it defined solely by relations. In 1999, Christopher Brochu redefined Eusuchia as "the last common ancestor of Hylaeochampsa and Crocodylia and all of its descendants". In this definition, "Crocodylia" specifically refers to descendants of the common ancestor of the three modern lineages of eusuchians: Gavialoidea (gharials), Alligatoroidea (alligators and caimans), and Crocodyloidea (crocodiles). Whether certain families or genera qualify as basal eusuchians or non-eusuchian neosuchians is a matter of debate over which definition is used for the group. At least one genus, Isisfordia, would qualify as a eusuchian under Huxley's definition of the group but would not necessarily qualify under Brochu's definition.

== Description ==
Unlike primitive crocodylomorphs, crocodyliforms have secondary bony palates. This feature enables living crocodylians to safely breathe in through their nostrils while the rest of the head (including the mouth) remains submerged. This structure reaches its greatest elaboration among eusuchians, in which the internal nares are completely surrounded by the pterygoid bones.

Unlike more basal neosuchians, eusuchians have four rather than two rows of dorsal armour plates, which are square in shape, with 2 to 4 rows of accessory plates.

=== Phylogeny ===
A 2018 tip dating study by Lee & Yates using both molecular, morphological and stratigraphic data recovered the cladogram below:

- - Goniopholis†
  - - - Bernissartia†
      - Shamosuchus†
    - Eusuchia
      - - Acynodon†
        - Hylaeochampsidae†
          Hylaeochampsa†
      - - Allodaposuchidae†
          - Allodaposuchus†
          - Lohuecosuchus†
        - - - Borealosuchus†
            - "Thoracosaurs"
              - Eothoracosaurus†
              - - Thoracosaurus†
                - - Argochampsa†
                  - - Eogavialis†
                    - Eosuchus†
          - - Planocraniidae†
            - Crocodylia (crown)

A 2021 Rio & Mannion phylogenetic study using a heavily modified morphological data set recovered the cladogram below:

- - Bernissartia fagesii†
  - - - Isisfordia duncani†
      - - Theriosuchus pusillus†
        - Paralligatoridae
          - Shamosuchus djadochtaensis†
          - - Glen Rose Form
            - Wannchampsus kirpachi†
    - Eusuchia
      - Hylaeochampsidae†
        - Acynodon iberoccitanus
        - - Hylaeochampsa vectiana
          - Iharkutosuchus makadii
      - - Allodaposuchidae†
        - - Borealosuchus†
          - Crocodylia (crown)
            - Alligatoroidea
            - - Planocraniidae†
              - Longirostres
                - Gavialoidea
                - Crocodyloidea
