= Hylaeochampsa =

Hylaeochampsa Temporal range: Early Cretaceous: Barremian, 127.2–125 Ma

Scientific classification
- Kingdom: Animalia
- Phylum: Chordata
- Class: Reptilia
- Clade: Archosauria
- Clade: Pseudosuchia
- Clade: Crocodylomorpha
- Clade: Metasuchia
- Clade: Neosuchia
- Clade: Eusuchia
- Family: †Hylaeochampsidae
- Genus: †Hylaeochampsa; Owen, 1874

Type species
- †Hylaeochampsa vectiana Owen, 1874

Synonyms
- Heterosuchus valdensis? Seeley, 1877

Extinct genus of reptiles

Hylaeochampsa is an extinct genus of eusuchian crocodylomorphs. It is known only from a partial skull recovered from Barremian-age rocks of the Lower Cretaceous Vectis Formation (Wealden Group) of the Isle of Wight. This skull, BMNH R 177, is short and wide, with a eusuchian-like palate and inferred enlarged posterior teeth that would have been suitable for crushing. Hylaochampsa was described by Richard Owen in 1874, with H. vectiana as the type species. It may be the same genus as the slightly older Heterosuchus, inferred to have been of similar evolutionary grade, but there is no overlapping material as Heterosuchus is known only from vertebrae. If the two could be shown to be synonyms, Hylaeochampsa would have priority because it is the older name. Hylaeochampsa is the type genus of the family Hylaeochampsidae, which also includes Iharkutosuchus from the Late Cretaceous of Hungary. James Clark and Mark Norell positioned it as the sister group to Crocodylia. Hylaeochampsa is currently the oldest known unambiguous eusuchian.

The cladogram below results from a 2011 Buscalioni et al. phylogenetic study:

- Eusuchia
  - - Hylaeochampsidae†
      - Hylaeochampsa vectiana†
      - - Iharkutosuchus†
        - - Pietraroiasuchus ormezzanoi†
          - Pachycheilosuchus trinquei†
    - Allodaposuchus†
  - Crocodylia
