= Ophiussasuchus =

Ophiussasuchus Temporal range: Late Jurassic Kimmeridgian–Tithonian

Scientific classification
- Kingdom: Animalia
- Phylum: Chordata
- Class: Reptilia
- Clade: Pseudosuchia
- Clade: Crocodylomorpha
- Family: †Goniopholididae
- Genus: †Ophiussasuchus; López-Rojas et al., 2024

Type species
- Ophiussasuchus paimogonectes López-Rojas et al., 2024

Extinct genus of reptiles

Ophiussasuchus ("Crocodile of Ophiussa") is an extinct genus of goniopholidid neosuchian from the Upper Jurassic Lourinhã Formation of Portugal. It was a medium-sized goniopholidid, about 2.5 m to 3 m long, with a flattened skull and mesorostrine snout. Although most closely related to the Cretaceous goniopholids of Europe, such as Hulkepholis and Anteophthalmosuchus, Ophiussasuchus shares a variety of characteristics with more basal taxa from the Jurassic of Asia and North America. This could suggest that it either represents a transitional form or that this genus independently re-evolved these ancestral features. Ophiussasuchus is a monotypic genus, only including a single species: O. paimogonectes.

== Discovery ==
Ophiussasuchus was described on the basis of a nearly complete skull found in Paimogo beach, Lourinhã, Portugal, which correlates to the Praia Azul Member of the Lourinhã Formation. The material was discovered in 2021 by fossil collector Holger Lüdtke, who had previously discovered the first remains of Europasaurus in Germany. Following correspondence with the Parque dos Dinossauros da Lourinhã and the Dinosaurier-Park Münchehagen, the fossil was donated to the Lourinhã Museum.

The name Ophiussasuchus is a combination of the Greek words "souchos" meaning crocodile and "Ophiussa", the name given to Portugal by the ancient Greeks. The species name "paimogonectes" translates to "Paimogo swimmer", a nod to Paimogo beach where the type material was found.

== Description ==
The skull of Ophiussasuchus is described as platyrostral, meaning flattened, and mesorostrine, meaning the snout was moderately long and wide. This sets it apart from the short-snouted (brevirostrine) Nannosuchus and the long-snouted (longirostrine) Hulkepholis. Among goniopholids this snout shape is also seen in Goniopholis itself and Amphicotylus and all three taxa share a convex maxilla, meaning that when observed in top view the snout forms a prominent bulge or festoon in the area around the first five maxillary teeth. Relative to this, Hulkepholis had a much straighter and narrower snout, lacking this sinuous silhouette. The back part of the skull meanwhile is anatomically much more similar to Hulkepholis than to Goniopholis.

Like in other goniopholids, the premaxillae preserve prominent notches on either side at the elements' contact with the maxillae, which would house the largest tooth of the dentary when the jaws are closed. As is typical for goniopholids, this gives the tip of the snout a vaguely axe-like shape, although it is much less pronounced than in other members of the family. This is due to the fact that the posterior border is not as sharpened and instead much more rounded, similar to what is seen in Goniopholis simus. The nares are located at the tip of the snout and face mostly up like in modern crocodiles, however they are slightly inclined, meaning the front most part faces slightly forward. While this is more pronounced than in Goniopholis kiplingi with its fully dorsally facing nares, its not as developed as in Neosuchians with anterodorsal nares such as Sarcosuchus or Calsoyasuchus. The edges of the nares are smooth and lack the perinarial crest seen in other goniopholids. Further back, where the maxilla reaches its greatest width and depth (just above the fifth maxillary tooth) the maxilla is slightly raised, giving it a swollen appearance. In contrast to this stand the maxillary depressions which are located at the back corner of the maxilla. Such chambers are a common feature among goniopholids, with most genera preserving them and even some pholidosaurids sharing this characteristic. The number is comparably high in Ophiussasuchus, displaying a minimum of four depressions on the left maxilla and five on the right, although this difference could be the result of preservation. The nasals are a pair of long and slender bones that stretch across the rostrum from the frontal to the premaxillae, though they do not reach the external nares like in modern crocodiles. They are straight and sub-parallel between the maxillae. This is common among goniopholids, but Ophiussasuchus differs in that the sub-parallel edges continue to the contact with the lacrimals, showing little to no expansion towards the sides. The palpebral bones and postorbital bones are raised, creating a clear difference in elevation between them and the frontal bone which is notably depressed. Overall this gives the skull table a concave form. The main body of the frontal, which contributes to the skull table, lacks the lateral expansions seen in many other goniopholids, meaning that unlike in said forms this element is not T-shaped in Ophiussasuchus. The nares have sub-parallel margins, giving it an appearance more similar to early goniopholids like Amphicotylus.

Five teeth were present in either premaxilla, the smallest of which were the first and fifth while the third and fourth were the largest. Notably, several large pits are present in the underside of the premaxillae, specifically one located behind and between first and second alveoli and another behind and between the third and fourth on either side, adding up to a total of four pits. A small opening, the incisive foramen is present along the midline between the pits that are situated between the first two alveoli and a series of smaller neurovascular foramen can also be observed. The maxillae contain 18 alveoli on either side and since no pits or toothless gaps are present between the toothsockets it was inferred that the genus had an overbite similar to today's alligators. This is further confirmed by the presence of occlusal pits located medially to the actual toothrow. The teeth themselves are described as caniniforms with smooth carinae and a rounded crosssection.

When looking at the skull from below one can see that the ventral surface of the maxillae extend into the ventral surface of the premaxillae along a V-shaped suture. The same is true for the contact between the maxillae and the palatines, with the latter extending into the former along a V-shaped suture that is much more acute than in most other goniopholids. It most closely resembles the conditions seen in Hulkepholis willetti and Calsoyasuchus, the morphology being somewhat intermediate between the two. Two small and crescent-shaped palatal fenestra are formed by the maxillae and the palatines and both elements contribute to the much larger suborbital fenestrae. A narrow nasopharyngeal duct is partially enclosed by the palatines and opens up into the internal choana towards the back where the palatines meet the pterygoid bones. In this regard the genus represents an intermediate between basal goniopholids from Asia and America and the derived European forms its most closely related to. Palatal fenestrae are known from two species of Sunosuchus, though they are far less extensive in Ophiussasuchus, and basal American goniopholids display more open palates with more widely exposed nasopharyngeal ducts. By contrast, the derived European forms lack palatal fenestrae and have the nasopharyngeal ducts fully enclosed.

Ophiussasuchus was a medium-sized member of its family, the skull alone measuring 30 cm (12 in) from the tip of the snout to the suspected end of the occipital condyle and 30 cm (12 in) from the tip of the snout to the rear-most point of the quadrate condyle. Based on the methodology of Young et al. (2011) the full animal would measure somewhere around 2.5–3 m (8 ft 2 in – 9 ft 10 in).

== Phylogeny ==
Phylogenetic analysis recovers Ophiussasuchus as a derived goniopholidid and sister to the clade formed by the genera Hulkepholis and Anteophthalmosuchus, both known from the early Cretaceous of Europe. While the tree is well resolved, the authors note that there is nonetheless poor bootstrap and bremer support for the results. One matter raised in the description is the fact that the closest relatives of Ophiussasuchus, according to the initial study, are exclusively known from Cretaceous strata whereas the genus itself is Jurassic, much closer in time to Goniopholis. It is further noted that some of the synapomorphies seen in Ophiussasuchus are also seen in much older forms while also being absent in the most derived goniopholids.

- Goniopholididae
  - Calsoyasuchus
  - - Eutretauranosuchus
    - - Sunosuchus junggarensis
      - - Sunosuchus miaoi
        - - Siamosuchus
          - - Amphicotylus
            - - Nannosuchus
              - - Goniopholis
                - - Ophiussasuchus
                  - - Hulkepholis willetti
                    - - - Hulkepholis rori
                        - Hulkepholis plotos
                      - Anteophthalmosuchus

== Paleobiogeography ==
The brackish environment of the Lourinhã Formation is commonly compared to the continental Morrison Formation of North America, with both geological units sharing a large portion of their vertebrate fauna in terms of genera. While the two regions began separating by the Late Triassic when the North Atlantic opened, their shared fauna seems to suggest some interchange still taking place into the Late Jurassic. The separate bioms may have still lead to endemism however, expressed through both formations containing different species of the same genus (such as Torvosaurus). Goniopholids are known from both the Morrison and Lourinhã, but following revisions that placed American Goniopholis in their own genus, Amphicotylus, the two formations do not share the same genera.

Ophiussasuchus is linked phylogenetically to the younger Hulkepholis and Anteophthalmosuchus, while its geologically and geographically closest to Goniopholis, generally showing a connection to other European forms. At the same time, several anatomical features tie the genus to more basal forms from the Jurassic of North America. An ancestral state reconstruction analysis was performed by López-Rojas and colleagues in an attempt to determine if the last common ancestor between Hulkepholis, Anteophthalmosuchus and Ophiussasuchus would have displayed derived characteristics of the palate and choana or if these changes only came to be in the two Cretaceous forms. The analysis suggests that it was highly probable (92-98% probability) that the last common ancestor of all three genera had a derived choana, which in turn suggests that this anatomy must have been reversed in Ophiussasuchus. It is however unclear whether or not the return to a more basal anatomy arose through convergent evolution or if the derived adaptations were simply lost. Simultaneously one characteristic, the position of the nasopharyngeal duct relative to the internal naris, is shared only by Siamosuchus. Since the ancestral state reconstruction suggests that this feature was not ancestral to the clade containing Siamosuchus and all more derived goniopholids, this feature must have evolved convergently between the two.
