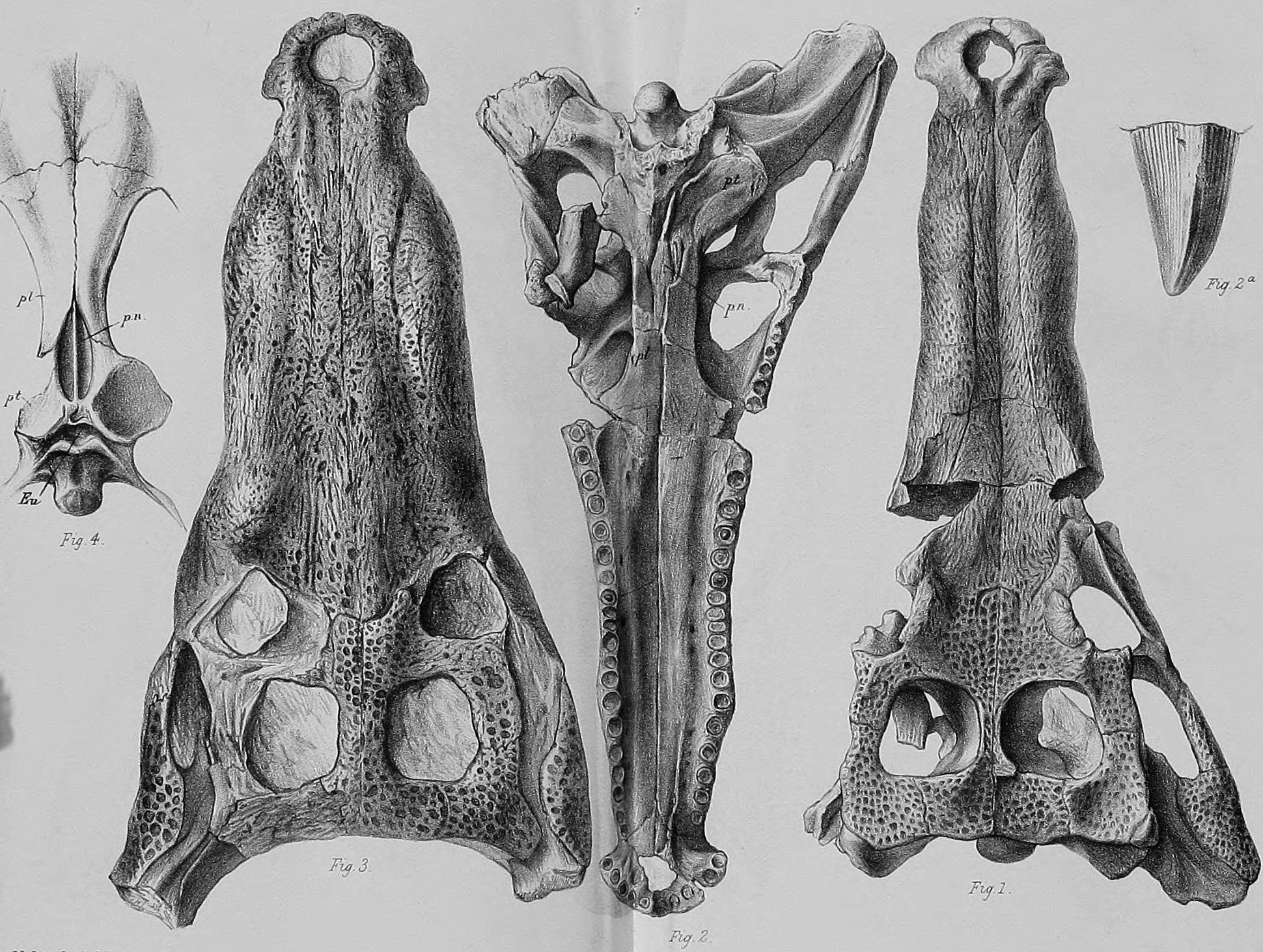
- Fig. 1 and 2 (right) show the H. willetti holotype skull, fig. 3 is Goniopholis for comparison, as figured by John W. Hulke in 1878

Scientific classification
- Kingdom: Animalia
- Phylum: Chordata
- Class: Reptilia
- Clade: Archosauria
- Clade: Pseudosuchia
- Clade: Crocodylomorpha
- Family: †Goniopholididae
- Genus: †Hulkepholis; Buscalioni et al., 2013

Type species
- †Goniopholis willetti Salisbury & Naish, 2011

Species
- †H. plotos Buscalioni et al., 2013; †H. rori Arribas et al., 2019; †H. willetti Salisbury & Naish, 2011

= Hulkepholis =

Hulkepholis Temporal range: Early Cretaceous, 135–112 Ma

Extinct genus of reptiles

Hulkepholis is an extinct genus of goniopholidid neosuchian from the Early Cretaceous of southern England and eastern Spain. It contains two species, the type species, Hulkepholis willetti, and also H. plotos. Hulkepholis is most closely related to both species of Anteophthalmosuchus (including "Dollo's goniopholidid").

== Discovery ==
H. willetti is known from a single holotype specimen, BMNHB 001876 from the Wealden Group of the Isle of Wight that includes a well-preserved nearly complete skull. It was collected by Edgar W. Willett at Cuckfield, West Sussex, from the Valanginian-aged Grinstead Clay Member, of the Hastings Group, Wealden Supergroup. Willett showed the specimen to the Geological Society of London in or around 1877 or 1878, and it was then Hulke (1878) described it as a specimen of Goniopholis crassidens, an identification derived from a similar tooth form. The specimen was considered lost among the crocodyliform research community but was actually safely accessioned at the Booth Museum in Brighton. It was identified as "the long-lost crocodilian of Mr Willett" by Steve (1998), "Willett's specimen" by Salisbury et al. (1999) and "Hulke's specimen" by Andrande et al. (2011). It was assigned to a new species of Goniopholis, Goniopholis willetti, by Salisbury and Naish in 2011 honoring its collector. A broad phylogenetic analysis of crocodyliforms published the same year by Andrande et al. (2011), found the specimen to be the sister taxon of the clade formed by Anteophthalmosuchus hooleyi and the unnamed "Dollo's goniopholidid". Thus it was reassigned to its own genus by Buscalioni et al. (2013), creating the combinatio nova, Hulkepholis willetti. The generic name honors John Whitaker Hulke who described the specimen as belonging to Goniopholis.

A second species, Hulkepholis plotos, was first described and named by A.D. Buscalioni, L. Alcalá, E. Espílez and L. Mampel in 2013. The specific name is derived from Greek mythology πλοτός, plotos, the drifter. It is known solely from the holotype AR-1/56, a partial skeleton which consists of AR-1-2045, a nearly complete but crushed skull; AR-1-2048, 4859, 4860, three vertebrae; AR-1-2046, a rib; AR-1-2048, a metapodial; and AR-1-2049, 4861, 4862, three osteoderms. It was collected from the early Albian-aged Escucha Formation, at Santa Maria Mine located in the municipality of Ariño, Teruel Province, of Aragon, along with the closely related Anteophthalmosuchus escuchae.

== Phylogeny ==
Goniopholis willetti was included in a phylogenetic analysis of goniopholidids that was published soon before the specimen was redescribed. It was found to be most closely related to the clade formed by a specimen called "Dollo's goniopholidid", and "Hooley's goniopholidid", now named Anteophthalmosuchus hooleyi. Below is a cladogram from that analysis:

- Neosuchia
  - Atoposauridae
    - Theriosuchus pusillus
    - Theriosuchus guimarotae
  - - - Rugosuchus
      - - Bernissartia
        - Eusuchia
    - - Stolokrosuchus
      - - - Tethysuchia
          - Thalattosuchia
        - Goniopholididae
          - Calsoyasuchus valliceps
          - - - "Goniopholis" phuwiangensis
              - - Eutretauranosuchus delfi
                - "Sunosuchus" junggarensis
              - - Sunosuchus miaoi
                - Sunosuchus thailandicus
            - - Siamosuchus phuphokensis
              - - Amphicotylus lucasii
                - - Denazinosuchus kirtlandicus
                  - Nannosuchus gracilidens
                  - - - Hulkepholis (Hulke's goniopholidid)
                      - - Anteophthalmosuchus (Hooley's goniopholidid)
                        - Anteophthalmosuchus (Dollo's goniopholidid)
                    - Goniopholis
                      - Goniopholis baryglyphaeus
                      - - Goniopholis kiplingi
                        - Goniopholis simus
