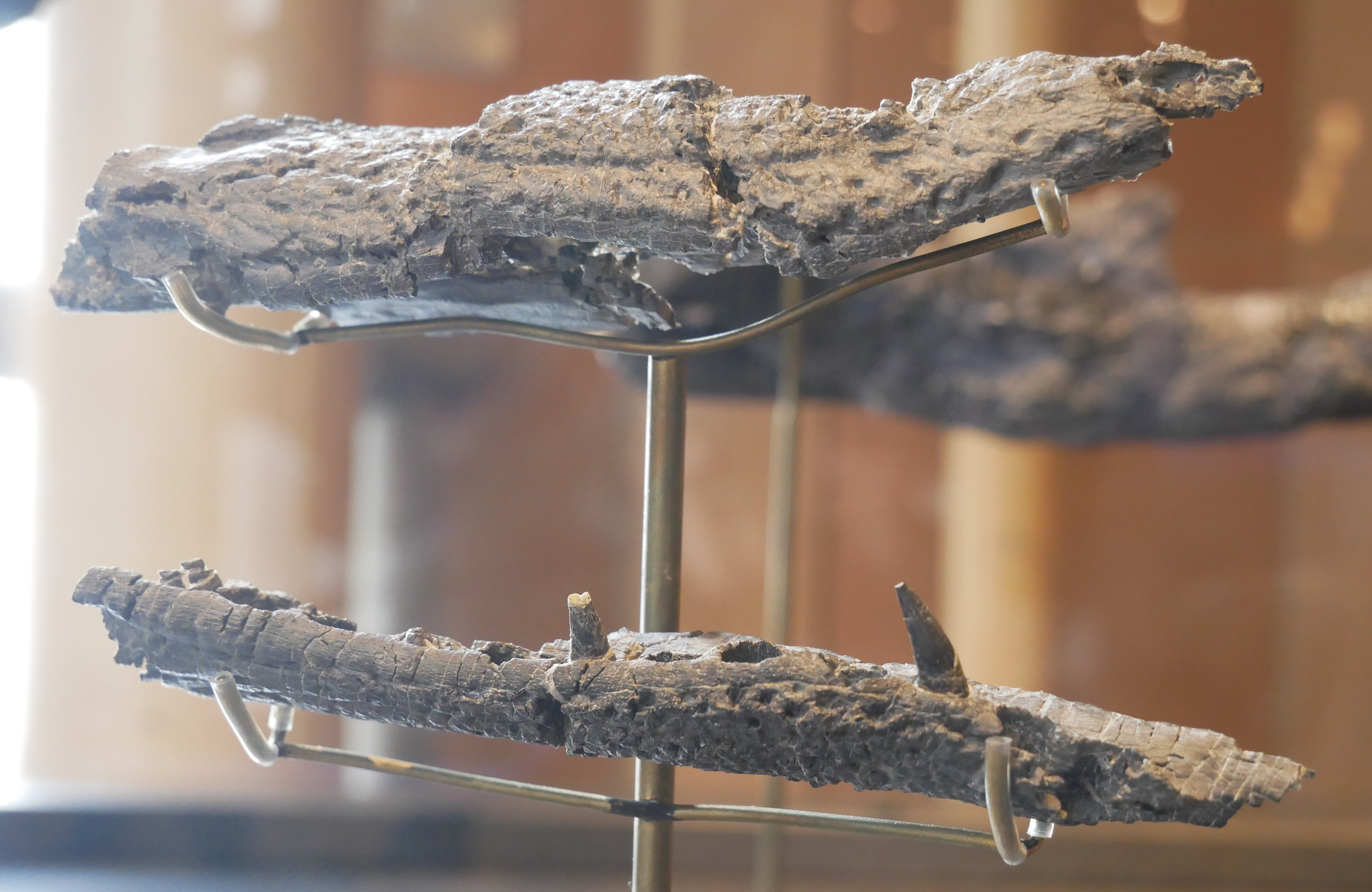
- Jaws on display in the Cincinnati Museum Center

Scientific classification
- Kingdom: Animalia
- Phylum: Chordata
- Class: Reptilia
- Clade: Pseudosuchia
- Clade: Crocodylomorpha
- Family: †Goniopholididae
- Genus: †Eutretauranosuchus; Mook, 1967

Type species
- †Eutretauranosuchus delfsi Mook, 1967

= Eutretauranosuchus =

Eutretauranosuchus Temporal range: Late Jurassic ~163–145 Ma

Extinct genus of reptiles

Eutretauranosuchus is an extinct genus of goniopholidid crocodyliform. E. delfsi is the only known species within the genus.

== Discovery and history ==
The holotype of Eutretauranosuchus delfsi was discovered by Edwin Delfs in 1957 among remains recovered from the Morrison Formation in Canon City, Colorado. It was first described in detail by Charles Mook in 1967. The fossil remains consisted of an almost-complete skull as well as some limb bones.

The name Eutretauranosuchus was given by Delfs upon its discovery in reference to its "doubly pierced palate". The holotype specimen was named E. delfsi by Mook in tribute to Delfs.

Mook found E. delfsi differs significantly from previously described Mesosuchian crocodiles. This specimen was deemed part of a new species because of its extremely elongated internal narial aperture, which was notably longer than those of previously described specimens of similar size. Mook also described an additional, smaller opening located anterior to the internal nares, divided by the palatine processes, which was hypothesized to have entered the narial passage. According to Mook, these features were an indication of a wide-ranged specialization among Goniopholididae and indicated the described specimen is a holotype for a new genus.

Recent findings suggest that Mook's original description of an additional nasal opening was incorrect and that this opening was part of an elongated choana that is extremely constricted medially by the expansion of the palatines, giving the illusion of a separate anteriorly located opening due to its hourglass-shape—as is commonly described in other E. delfsi, Amphicotylus lucasii and A. gilmorei specimens.

== Description and osteology ==
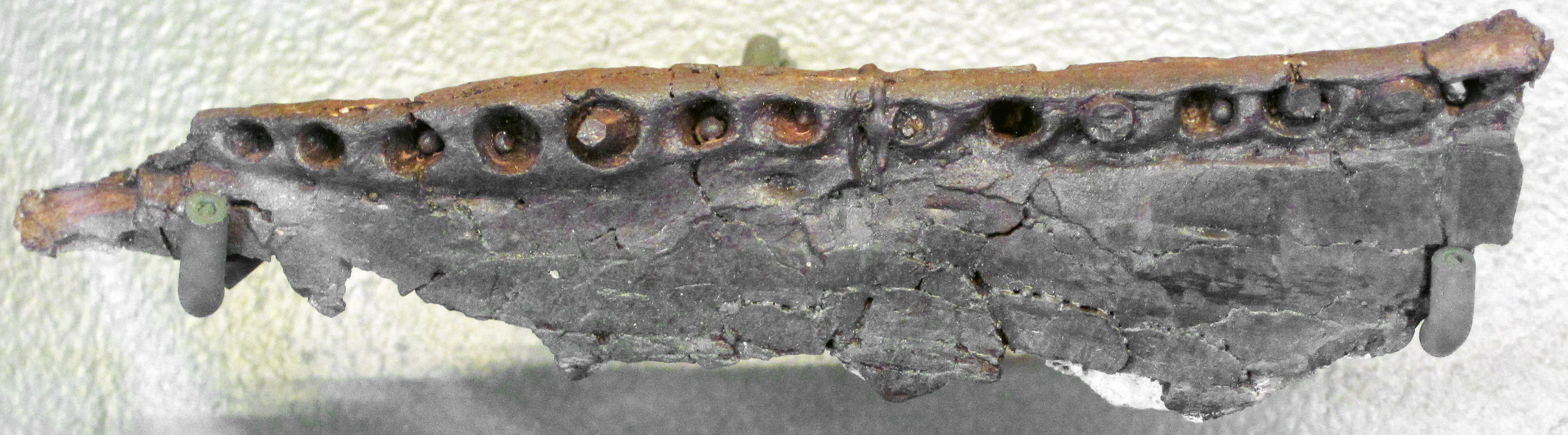
Jawbone of closely related Goniopholis sp. from the Morrison Formation, Upper Jurassic, Dinosaur National Monument, Utah

=== Skull ===
Characteristics of E. delfi skulls include an elongated and platyrostral skull, posterolateral depressions on the alveolar maxillary process, minimal lateral undulation of the tooth row (maxillary), broadened nasals located anteriorly to the prefrontals, a lack of contact between the nasals and external nares, a flattened and broad innerfenestral bar with rims that are raised along the supratemporal fenestra, and a nasopharyngeal septum formed by the anterior divergence of the vomeral processes. The lacrimal bone is rectangular and in dorsal view has an anteroposterior length that is two times its width. The lacrimal is contacted by the prefrontal laterally along its length, which separates the prefrontal from the nasal. A large postorbital bar with a triangular cross-section creates a separation between the orbit and the infratemporal fenestra. The quadratojugal has two regions: a smaller dorsal part that lacks dermal pitting, and a larger ventral region that is pitted and forms the bottom half of the infratemporal process, creating a significant indentation that is considered characteristic of this genus.

=== Palate ===
While the majority of Goniopholididae have historically been categorized by flattened snouts and posterolaterally located maxillary depressions, there remains great variation within their palatal anatomy. Most Morrison Formation goniopholidids display an 'incomplete' secondary palate, in which there is no ventral floor in the nasopharyngeal passage. Differences among palatal anatomy have been observed between Goniopholididae taxa found from the Cretaceous in Europe and species found in North America. European specimens such as G. simus and G.siplingi have a secondary bony palate formed from the palatines and maxillary processes. North American goniopholidids have maxillae and palatines that do not contact, resulting in a more open palate and a ventrally exposed bony nasopharyngeal passage.

=== Post-cranial skeleton ===
The postcranial skeleton of Goniopholididae is characterized by amphicoelous vertebrae, two rows of paravertebral osteoderms with "peg and groove" articulation and polygonal ventrally located osteoderms. Goniopholididae commonly have a closed paravertebral armor bracing system. The anteroposteriorly located crest on the ventral surfaces of Goniopholididae dorsal osteoderms has been hypothesized to be evidence that the epaxial musculature attached medially to a single paravertebral osteoderm, which is different from the three groups of epaxial musculature that attach to separate osteoderms in extant crocodylians.

== Geological and paleoenvironmental information ==
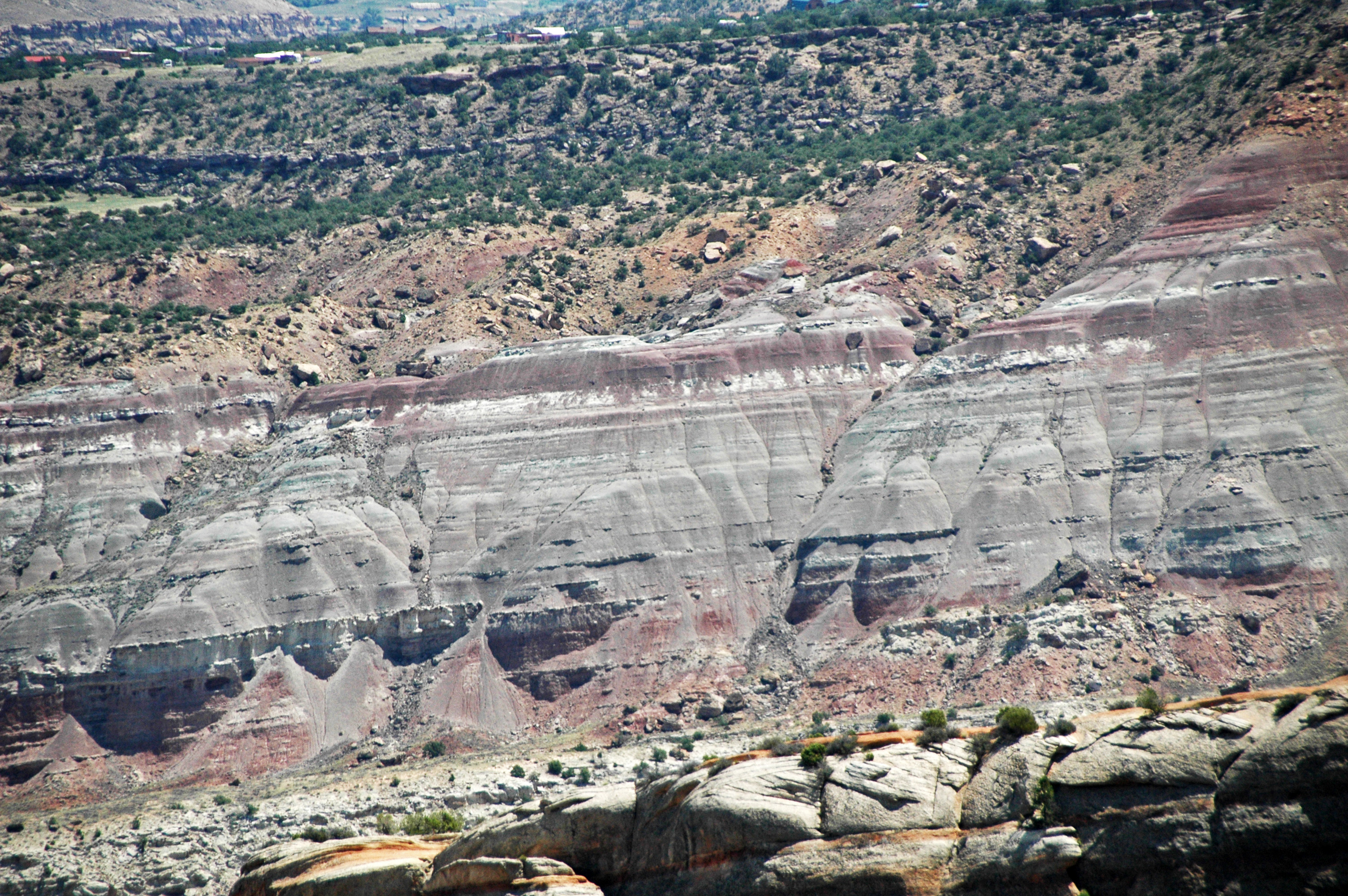
Morrison Formation, Colorado

Eutretauranosuchus is currently known from specimens found in the Upper Jurassic Dry Mesa Dinosaur Quarry in Canon City, Colorado; the Brushy Basin Member in Western Colorado; and the Bone Cabin Quarry site in Wyoming—all of which are parts of the Morrison Formation. Other Gonopholididae appear in strata from the Early Jurassic to Late Cretaceous. The family is classed as a Laurasian group, with specimens located in North America, Europe, and South-East Asia. Specimens from this group are often found in estuarine and freshwater deposits.

== Locomotion, paleoenvironment and feeding ==
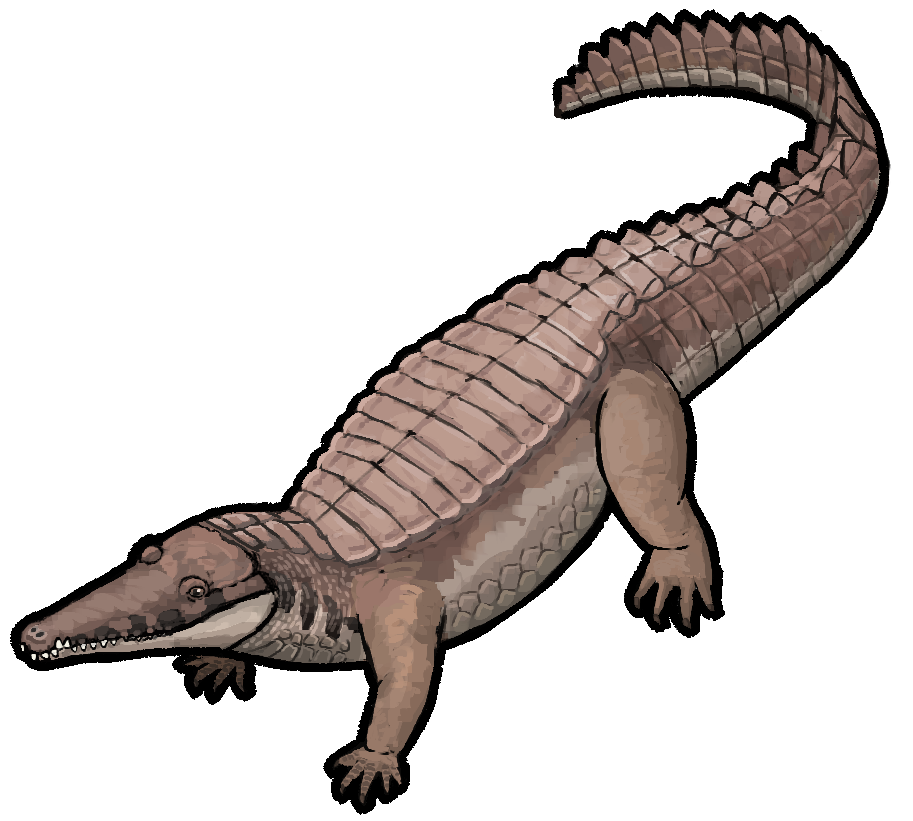
Life restoration

Goniopholidid crocodilians, including Eutretauranosuchus, are widely categorized as semi-aquatic forms. Preserved specimens indicate Eutretauranosuchus are moderately sized with an average estimated weight of 50–60 kg. The size and length of Goniopholididae specimens found in the Morrison Formation, as well as striated teeth, support the hypothesis that Eutretauranosuchus were carnivorous, feeding on prey such as insects, fish, small reptiles, mammals and dinosaurs. Eutretauranosuchus exhibited low enamel δ^{44/40}Ca values, suggesting a piscivorous diet.

== Phylogenetic analysis ==
E. delfsi is the only recognized species of Eutretauranosuchus. Other genera of Goniopholididae include Amphicotylus, Goniopholis, Sunosuchus, and Calsoyasuchus.

The exact phylogenetic placement of Eutretauranosuchus remains ambiguous. Phylogenetic analysis by Smith et al. in 2010 provides evidence that Eutretauranosuchus, Calsoyasuchus and Sunosuchus are closely related, and these findings are widely supported. However, while many publications support the phylogenetic placement of Eutretauranosuchus within the family of Goniopholididae, there is debate over whether it is more closely related to Goniopholis or Sunosuchus. Alternatively, phylogenetic assessment by J.R. Foster in 2006 considers Eutretauranosuchus to be most closely related to Pholidosaurus and dyrosauridae, and belonging to a larger clade that includes Bernissartia, Eusuchians and Goniopholis. Further research is needed to clarify these disputes.

Phylogenetic analysis by Allen (2012) claims that North American goniopholidid forms are monophyletic, excluding all other goniopholidids. It is proposed that this North America specific clade can be defined by channel-like, extremely elongated choanae that completely separate the palatines and that within this clade exists a further distinguished clade of the forms found in the Morrison Formation, which are defined by triangular prefrontals that rostrally extend past the lacrimals, preventing lacrimal contact with the nasals.

A recent study re-evaluated evolutionary history in relation to the Triassic-Jurassic mass extinction event. It concluded that the basal phylogenetic positioning of the goniopholidid crocodylomorph Calsoyasuchus valliceps suggests a substantial number of ghost lineages that should exist at the base of the crocodylomorphs. Furthermore, they reported an increase in crocodylomorph disparity across the Triassic-Jurassic boundary, which suggests there was rapid radiation of adaptation among crocodylomorphs. They hypothesize this was a result of the extinction's "decimation" of pseudosuchian and tetrapod lineages. The study concludes that the extinction was important for the evolutionary success of Goniopholididae.

A phylogenetic analysis by Brandelise de Andrade et al. is shown in the following cladogram:

- Neosuchia
  - Atoposauridae
    - Theriosuchus pusillus
    - Theriosuchus guimarotae
  - - - Rugosuchus
      - - Bernissartia
        - Eusuchia
    - - Stolokrosuchus
      - - - Tethysuchia
          - Thalattosuchia
        - Goniopholididae
          - Calsoyasuchus valliceps
          - - - "Goniopholis" phuwiangensis
              - - Eutretauranosuchus delfi
                - "Sunosuchus" junggarensis
              - - Sunosuchus miaoi
                - Chalawan thailandicus
            - - Siamosuchus phuphokensis
              - - Amphicotylus lucasii
                - - Denazinosuchus kirtlandicus
                  - Nannosuchus gracilidens
                  - - - Hulkepholis willetti
                      - - Anteophthalmosuchus
                        - Dollo's goniopholidid
                    - Goniopholis
                      - Goniopholis baryglyphaeus
                      - - Goniopholis kiplingi
                        - Goniopholis simus
