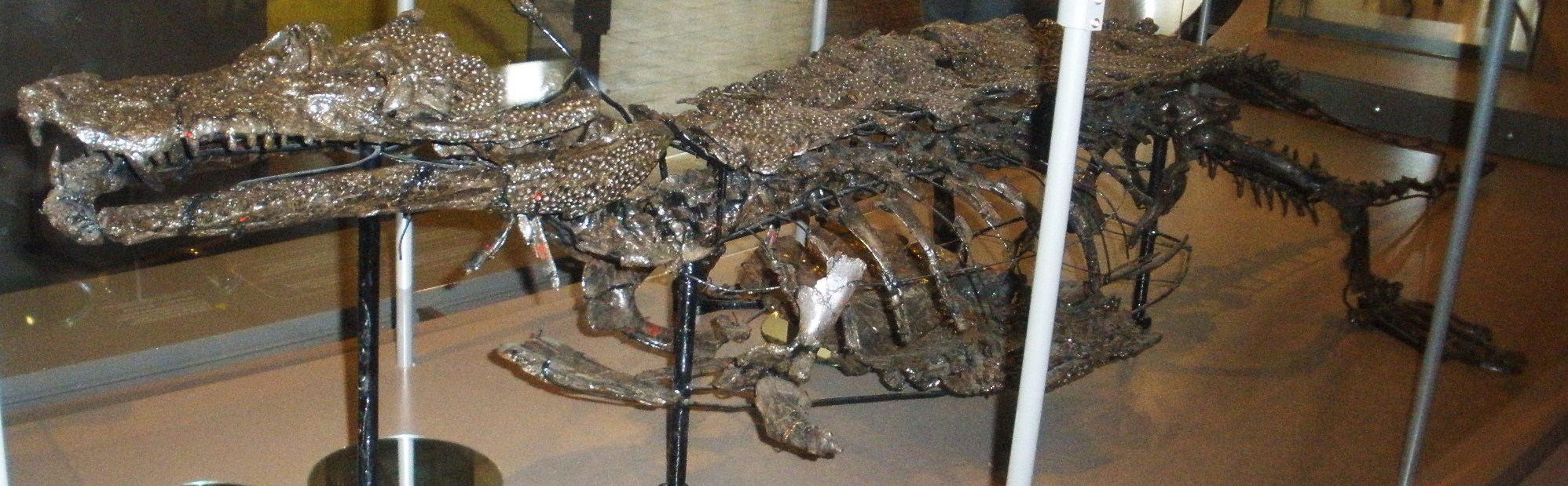
- A. epikrator ("Dollo's goniopholidid", specimen IRSNB R47), Musee d'Histoire Naturelle, Brussels

Scientific classification
- Kingdom: Animalia
- Phylum: Chordata
- Class: Reptilia
- Clade: Archosauria
- Clade: Pseudosuchia
- Clade: Crocodylomorpha
- Clade: Neosuchia
- Family: †Goniopholididae
- Genus: †Anteophthalmosuchus; Salisbury & Naish, 2011

Type species
- †Anteophthalmosuchus hooleyi Salisbury & Naish, 2011

Other species
- †A. escuchae Buscalioni et al., 2013; †A. epikrator Ristevski et al., 2017

Synonyms
- Leiokarinosuchus brookensis Salisbury & Naish, 2011

= Anteophthalmosuchus =

Anteophthalmosuchus Temporal range: Early Cretaceous, Barremian–Aptian

Extinct genus of reptiles

Anteophthalmosuchus (meaning "forward-pointing eye crocodile") is an extinct genus of goniopholidid neosuchian from the Early Cretaceous of southern England, eastern Spain, and western Belgium. It measured around 3.5–4 m (11–13 ft) in length, and had a skull length of about 60 cm (24 in).

== Discovery ==
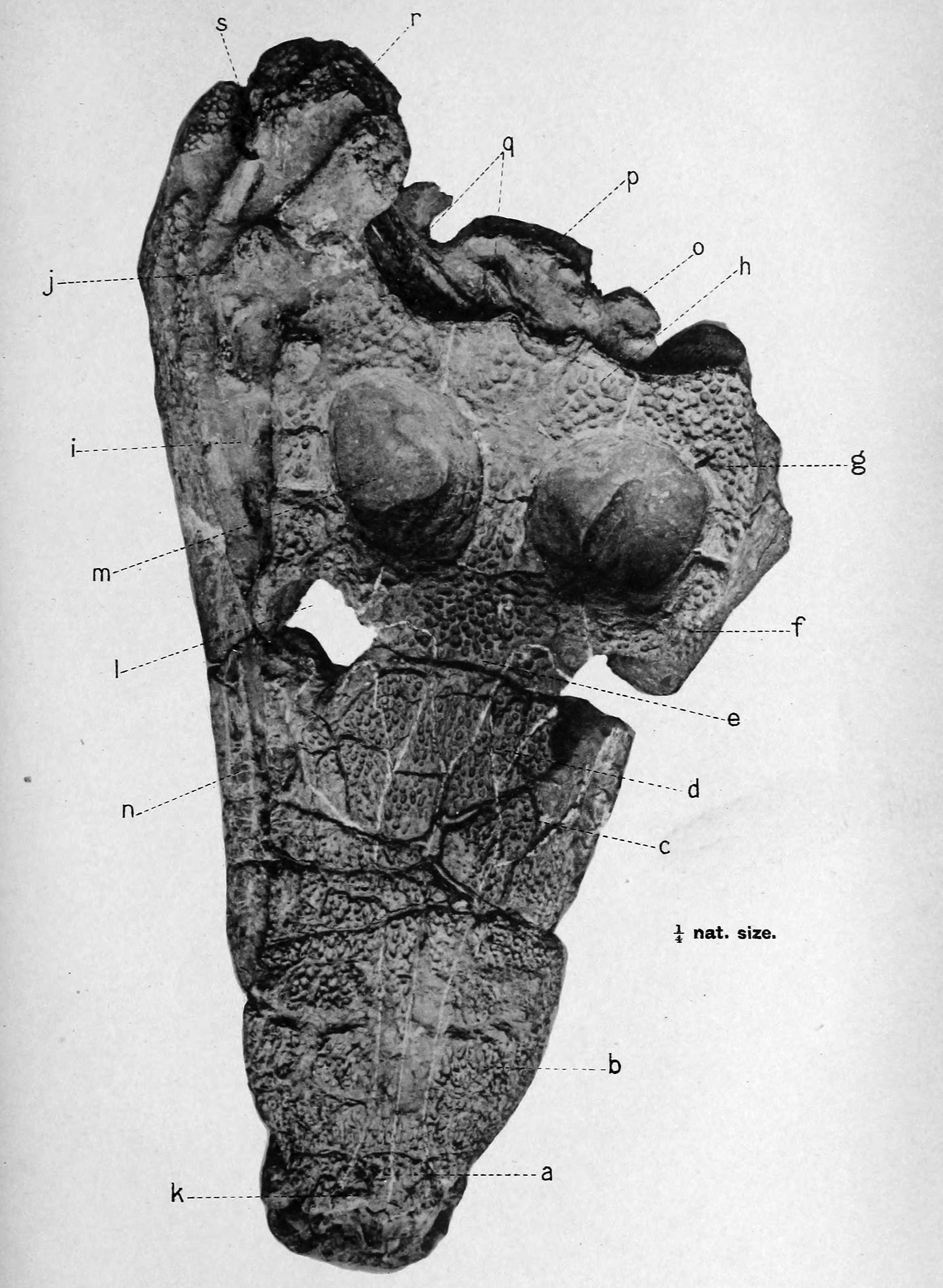
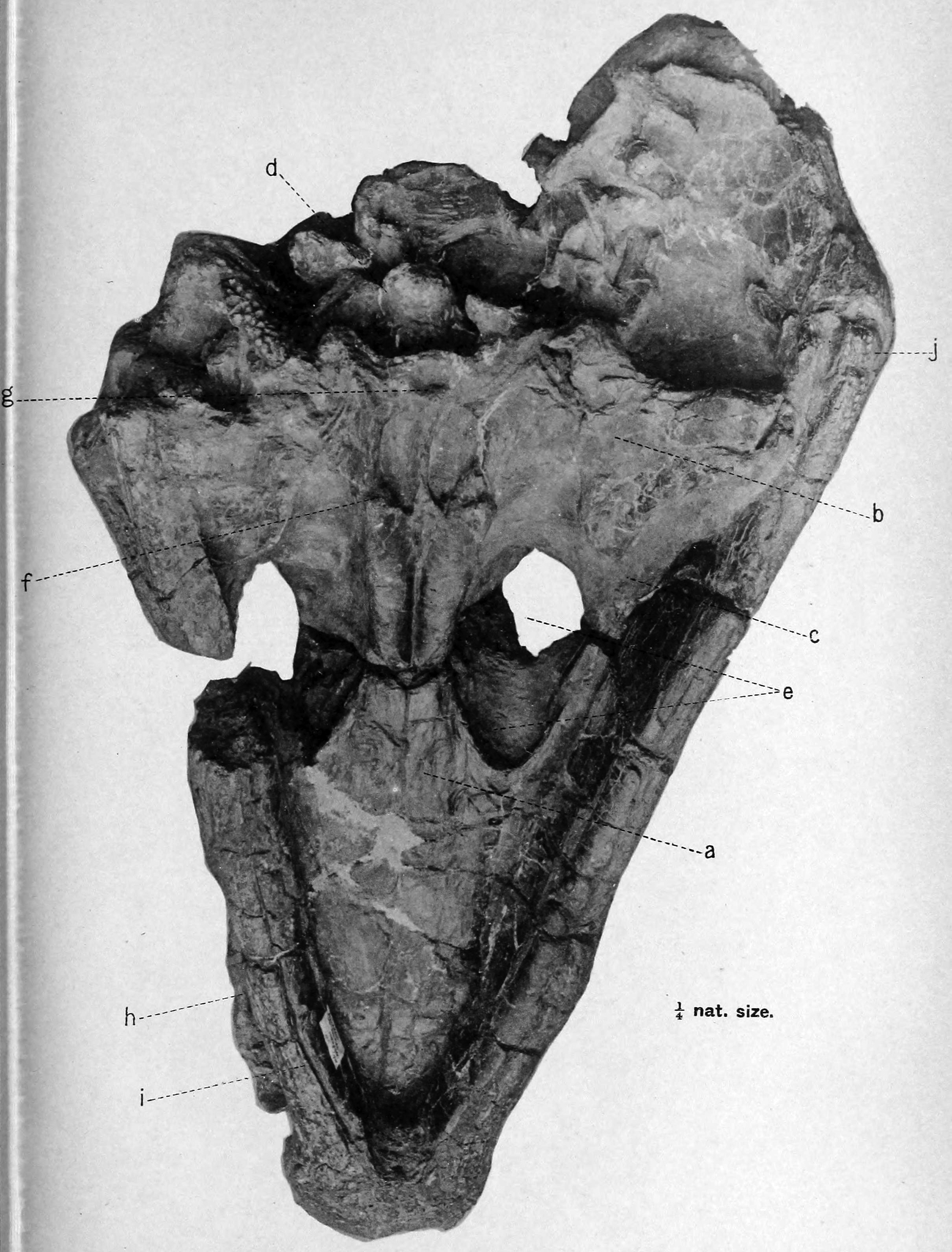
Holotype skull of A. hooleyi from the top and bottom from 1907

The holotype specimen of Anteophthalmosuchus, from the Wealden Group of the Isle of Wight, includes a well-preserved skull and partial skeleton. This specimen has been known since 1904 and was identified as the "Tie Pits specimen" or the "Hooley specimen" after Reginald Walter Hooley, an amateur paleontologist who had described it in 1905. Hooley had originally attributed the specimen to the previously named species Goniopholis crassidens. Additional referred specimens include a partial disarticulated skeleton and a partial skull that may represent a juvenile specimen.

In 2011, Hooley's specimen was redescribed as a distinct genus and species of goniopholidid called Anteophthalmosuchus hooleyi. The genus name means "forward-pointing eye crocodile" because the specimen's eye sockets are positioned high on the skull and angle forward rather than to the side as in most other flat-skulled crocodyliforms, and the species name honors Hooley. Features that distinguish A. hooleyi from Goniopholis crassidens include the lack of a hole in the lower jaw called the mandibular fenestra, very wide supratemporal fenestrae (openings) on the skull table, and a bone above the eye socket called the palpebral that is small and does not extend over the socket as in some other goniopholidids.

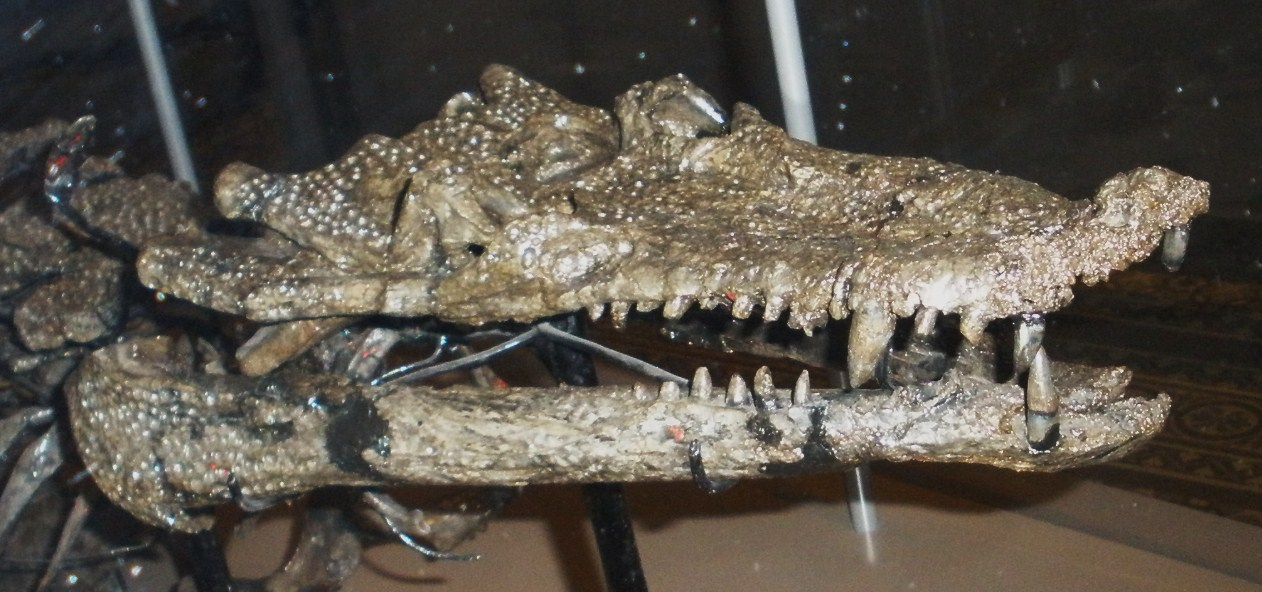
A. epikrator skull

Two specimens from Bernissart, Belgium, collectively referred to as "Dollo's goniopholidid", was referred to A. hooleyi in a 2016 redescription. The specimens, which consist of complete skeletons (one missing the skull) from the Sainte-Barbe Clays Formation, were originally referred to Goniopholis simus by Dollo. In 2016, they were recognized as specimens of A. hooleyi due to their distinctive eye sockets, among other defining characteristics of the species. While the Dollo specimens do not possess frontal bones that are pointed at the rostral end, a trait in 2011 to establish A. hooleyi as a distinct species, and also differs in the relative proportions of the occipital condyle and foramen magnum, the authors considered these traits invalid diagnostic characteristics, as they could be a consequence of age differences or preservational artifacts. However, in 2017, Dollo's goniopholidid was moved to a new species, Anteophthalmosuchus epikrator, based on comparisons with newly-discovered specimens from the Isle of Wight.

A second species, Anteophthalmosuchus escuchae, was first described and named by A.D. Buscalioni, L. Alcalá, E. Espílez and L. Mampel in 2013. It is known solely from the holotype AR-1-1097 which consists of a partial skull. It was collected from the early Albian-aged Escucha Formation, at Santa Maria Mine located in the municipality of Ariño, Teruel Province, of Aragon, along with the closely related Hulkepholis plotos.

== Description ==
Estimated at 3.5–4 m (11–13 ft) in length, Anteophthalmosuchus would have been the largest crocodyliform in the Wealden faunal assemblage, larger than the contemporaneous species Hylaeochampsa vectiana, Leiokarinosuchus brookensis, and Vectisuchus leptognathus.

=== Skull ===
Anteophthalmosuchus' skull, when complete, would have measured around 60 cm (24 in) in length. The majority of the skull, including the maxillary portion of the snout and most of the infratemporal (posterior, or rearward, but on the outside) part of the skull, was covered in regularly spaced, circular pits, as in Goniopholis. The palpebral bone was very small and did not project laterally (outwards) over the orbit (eye socket), unlike in other goniopholidids. The supratemporal fenestra was subcircular, and at its widest was almost twice the diameter of the orbits. The occipital condyle was roughly ten percent of the maximum width of the dorsal (top) portion of the skull. Unlike Goniopholis crassidens, but like G. baryglyphaeus (and another specimen, IRSNB R1537), A. hooleyi lacked an external mandibular fenestra (the opening situated posteriorly, or towards the back of, the mandible).

== Phylogeny ==
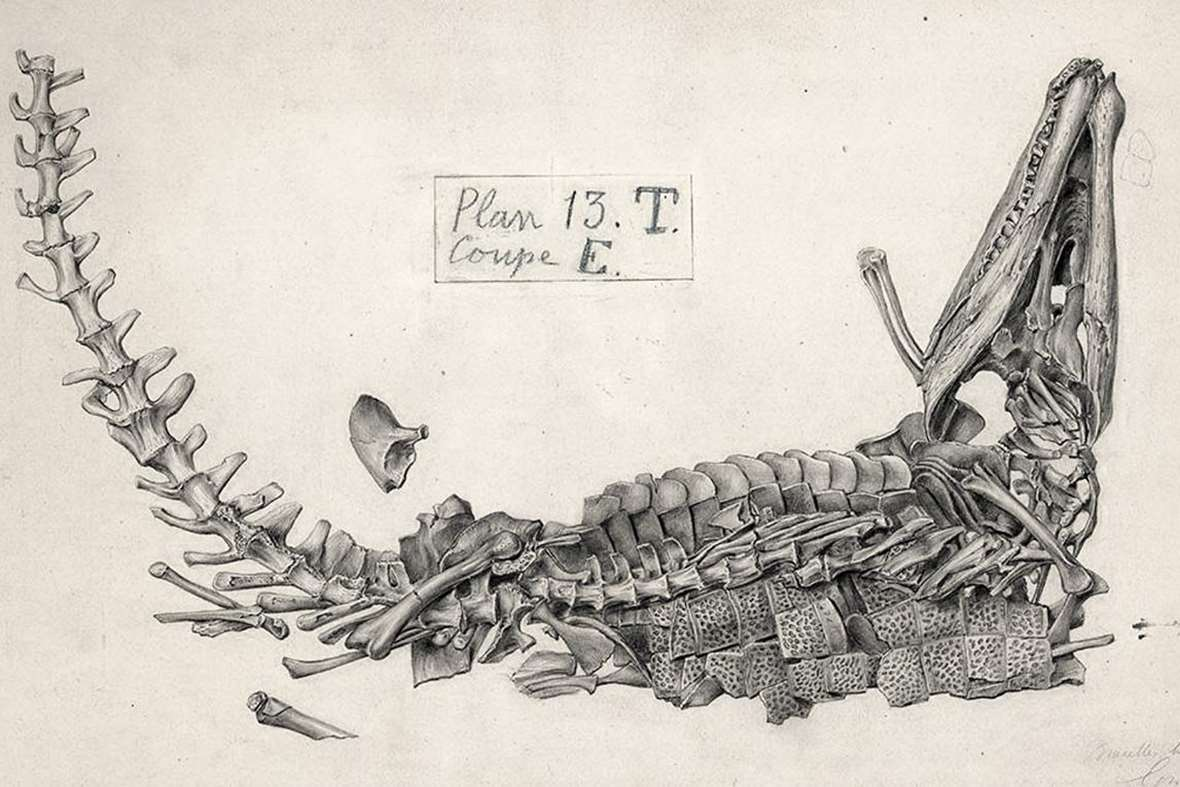
Illustration of "Dollo's goniopholidid", 1882

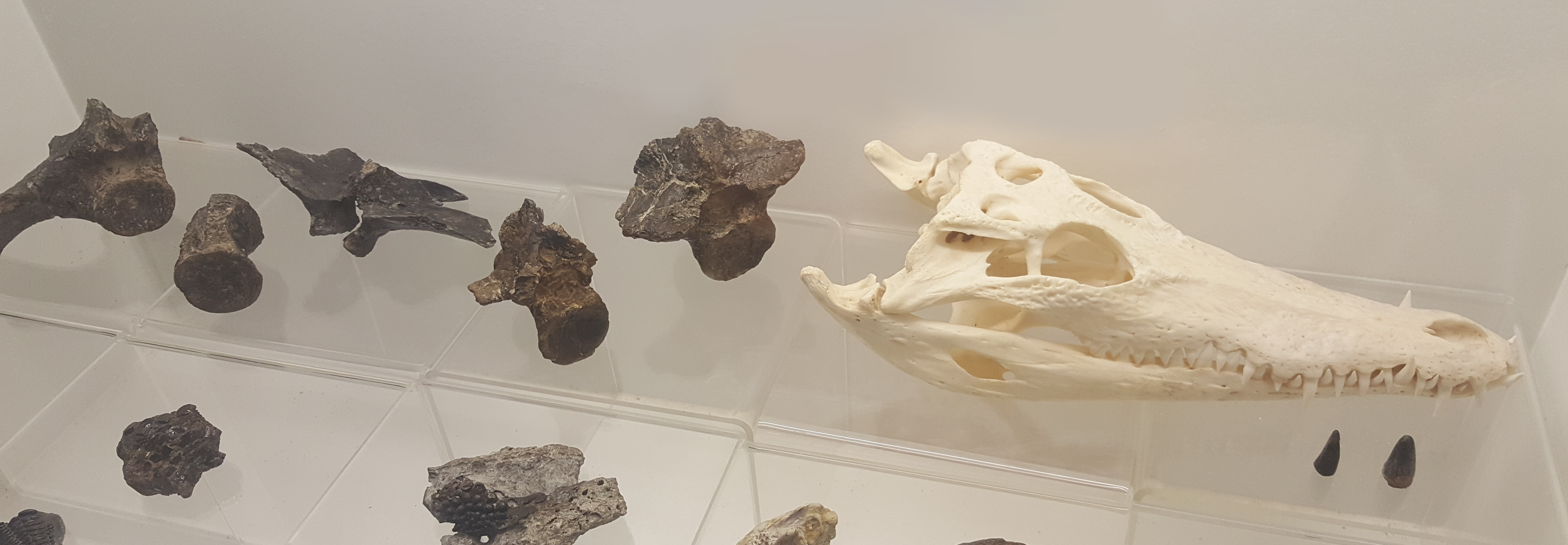
Fossils from the Wessex Formation alongside the skull of a modern crocodilian

Anteophthalmosuchus hooleyi was included in a phylogenetic analysis of goniopholidids that was published soon before the specimen was redescribed. The Hooley and Dollo specimens were found to be the closest relatives of a specimen called "Hulke's goniopholidid", now named Hulkepholis willetti. Below is a cladogram from that analysis:

- Neosuchia
  - Atoposauridae
    - Theriosuchus pusillus
    - Theriosuchus guimarotae
  - - - Rugosuchus
      - - Bernissartia
        - Eusuchia
    - - Stolokrosuchus
      - - - Tethysuchia
          - Thalattosuchia
        - Goniopholididae
          - Calsoyasuchus valliceps
          - - - "Goniopholis" phuwiangensis
              - - Eutretauranosuchus delfi
                - "Sunosuchus" junggarensis
              - - Sunosuchus miaoi
                - Sunosuchus thailandicus
            - - Siamosuchus phuphokensis
              - - Amphicotylus lucasii
                - - Denazinosuchus kirtlandicus
                  - Nannosuchus gracilidens
                  - - - Hulkepholis (Hulke's goniopholidid)
                      - - Anteophthalmosuchus (Hooley's goniopholidid)
                        - Anteophthalmosuchus (Dollo's goniopholidid)
                    - Goniopholis
                      - Goniopholis baryglyphaeus
                      - - Goniopholis kiplingi
                        - Goniopholis simus
