= Sunosuchus =

Sunosuchus Temporal range: Middle Jurassic - Early Cretaceous, 164.7–139.8 Ma (possible Early Jurassic occurrence)

Scientific classification
- Kingdom: Animalia
- Phylum: Chordata
- Class: Reptilia
- Clade: Pseudosuchia
- Clade: Crocodylomorpha
- Family: †Goniopholididae
- Genus: †Sunosuchus; Young, 1948

Species
- †S. miaoi Young, 1948 (type); †S. shartegensis? (possibly belongs to Chalawan) Efimov, 1988; †S. junggarensis Wu et al., 1996; †S. shunanensis Fu et al., 2005; †S. phuwiangensis (Buffetaut & Ingavat, 1983)

Extinct genus of reptiles

Sunosuchus is an extinct genus of goniopholidid mesoeucrocodylian. Fossils are known from China, Kyrgyzstan, and Thailand and are Jurassic in age, although some may be Early Cretaceous. Four species are currently assigned to the genus: the type species S. miaoi and the species S. junggarensis, S. shartegensis, and S. shunanensis. All species are from China. Goniopholis phuwiangensis, also from Thailand, was reassigned to Sunosuchus by Andrade et al. (2011). The material from Kyrgyzstan has not been assigned to any species.

== Description ==
Sunosuchus has a long, narrow snout and a small skull table. Several characters help diagnose Sunosuchus and distinguish it from other taxa. For example, there are wide pits on the back of the frontal bone. The frontal bone also has a distinctive ridge along part of its midline. The lower jaw has a long symphysis where the two halves come together. This symphysis is formed mostly from the mandibles, but also partially by the splenials. Unlike other goniopholidids, the squamosal bone (which is found near the back of the skull) is narrow.

== Species ==
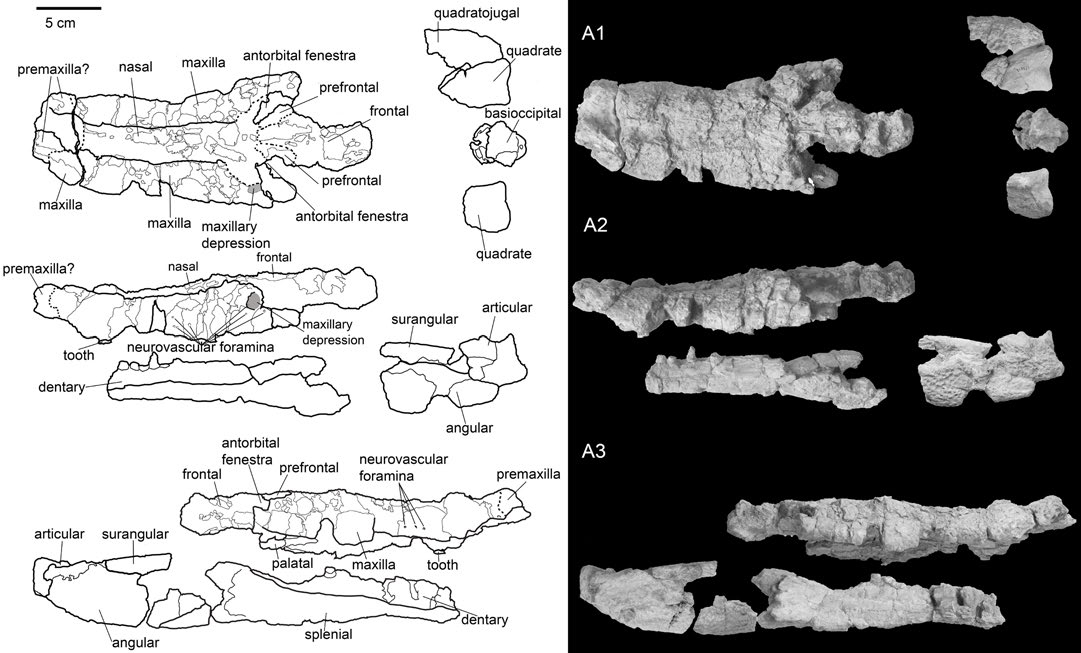
Holotype of S. shartegensis, which may have instead belonged to the related genus Chalawan

S. junggarensis is the best known species of Sunosuchus. It was first described in 1996 from the Late Jurassic Junggar Basin in Xinjiang, China. Material belonging to Sunosuchus was collected from Kyrgyzstan in the 1980s and was described in 2000. Many teeth were found, as well as a dorsal vertebra and some vertebral centra, some pelvic bones, part of a fibula and tibia, a few metatarsals, and ventral and neck osteoderms. The only parts of the skull uncovered were squamosal bones. The squamosals are similar to those of other species of Sunosuchus but not those of other genera, which indicates that the material belongs to a species of Sunosuchus. While the specimens bear a strong resemblance to the bones of S. junggarensis, they have not been assigned to any species.

A fifth species, S. shunanensis, was described in 2005 from the Middle Jurassic of Zigong in Sichuan, China. Skulls were collected from the Dashanpu Dinosaur Quarry in 1983, having been found in the Lower Shaximiao Formation. S. shunanensis has a longer snout than other species, being around three times the length of the postorbital region, or the portion of the skull behind the eyes. It also has a wider skull table than other species. The skull is widest at the back rather than between the eyes, a feature only seen in S. shunanensis. Near the back of each maxilla there is a distinct depression. There are unique ridges across the surface of the skull, one pair at the front of the eye socket on the lacrimals, and a second along the sides of the bacioccipitals and the undersurfaces of the exoccipitals at the base of the skull.

=== Formerly assigned to Sunosuchus ===
Sunosuchus thailandicus was described from northeastern Thailand in 1980. It is known only from the mandible, which is very robust. The tip of the jaw is spoon shaped and wider than the portion of the jaw immediately behind it. The mandible was collected from the Phu Kradung Formation near the town of Nong Bua Lamphu. This single specimen is the most well preserved vertebrate fossil that has been found from the formation; other vertebrates, including dinosaurs, are known only from fragmentary remains. The age of the Phu Kradung Formation is uncertain. It was once thought to be Early Jurassic, which would have made S. thailandicus the oldest species of Sunosuchus. However, the formation has more recently been considered to be Late Jurassic to Early Cretaceous in age, potentially making S. thailandicus the youngest species of the genus. However, a newly discovered specimen showed that S. thailandicus is sufficiently distinct from other nominal species of Sunosuchus to be placed in its own genus, Chalawan.

== Phylogeny ==
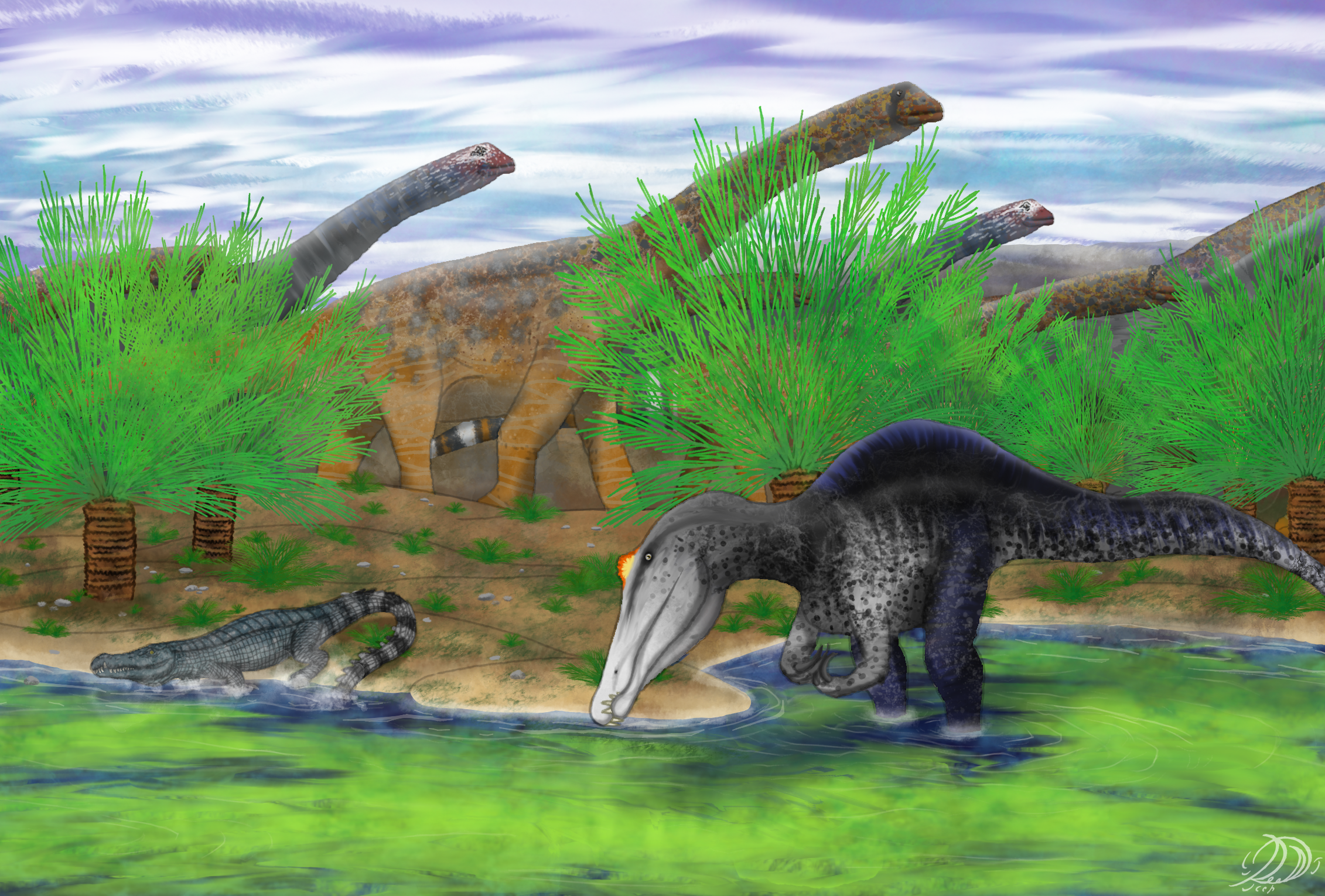
Life restoration of S. phuwiangensis (middle left) in the Sao Khua Formation environment, with the spinosaurid dinosaur Siamosaurus (right) and the sauropods Phuwiangosaurus in the background

Sunosuchus was initially classified as a pholidosaurid because its jaws were long, making it a longirostrine, or long-snouted, crocodyliform. Most pholidosaurs are longirostrine, while goniopholidids usually have shorter snouts. Despite the similarities with pholidosaurs, Sunosuchus shares several features with goniopholidids that ally it with the group. Among these features are small supratemporal fenestrae and openings at the front of the palate.

The results of a phylogenetic analysis conducted in 2011 focusing on the interrelationships of goniopholidids is shown below.

- Neosuchia
  - Atoposauridae
    - Theriosuchus pusillus
    - Theriosuchus guimarotae
  - - - Rugosuchus
      - - Bernissartia
        - Eusuchia
    - - Stolokrosuchus
      - - - Tethysuchia
          - Thalattosuchia
        - Goniopholididae
          - Calsoyasuchus valliceps
          - - - "Goniopholis" phuwiangensis
              - - Eutretauranosuchus delfi
                - "Sunosuchus" junggarensis
              - - Sunosuchus miaoi
                - Sunosuchus thailandicus
            - - Siamosuchus phuphokensis
              - - Amphicotylus lucasii
                - - Denazinosuchus kirtlandicus
                  - Nannosuchus gracilidens
                  - - - Hulkepholis (Hulke's goniopholidid)
                      - - Anteophthalmosuchus (Hooley’s goniopholidid)
                        - Anteophthalmosuchus (Dollo’s goniopholidid)
                    - Goniopholis
                      - Goniopholis baryglyphaeus
                      - - Goniopholis kiplingi
                        - Goniopholis simus

== Paleobiology ==
The material from Kyrgyzstan is the westernmost record of the geographic range of Sunosuchus. The strata from which this material has been found are similar to those of Mongolian and Chinese Middle and Late Jurassic strata. These areas shared a similar fauna that is characterized by crocodyliforms such as Sunosuchus as well as temnospondyl amphibians and xinjiangchelyid turtles, indicating freshwater environments across the region. Marine hybodont sharks and dipnoans are found in the Kyrgyzstan strata, suggesting that the area was estuarine at the time rather than entirely freshwater.
