= Calsoyasuchus =

Calsoyasuchus Temporal range: Early Jurassic, 196.5 Ma

Scientific classification
- Kingdom: Animalia
- Phylum: Chordata
- Class: Reptilia
- Clade: Pseudosuchia
- Clade: Crocodylomorpha
- Family: †Goniopholididae
- Genus: †Calsoyasuchus; Tykoski et al., 2002

Type species
- †Calsoyasuchus valliceps Tykoski et al., 2002

Extinct genus of reptiles

Calsoyasuchus (meaning "[Dr. Kyril] Calsoyas' crocodile") is a genus of crocodylomorph that lived in the Early Jurassic. Its fossilized remains were found in the Sinemurian-Pliensbachian-age Kayenta Formation on Navajo Nation land in Coconino County, Arizona, United States. Formally described as C. valliceps, it is known from a single incomplete skull which is unusually derived for such an early crocodile relative. This genus was described in 2002 by Ronald Tykoski and colleagues; the specific name means "valley head" and refers to a deep groove along the midline of the nasal bones and frontal bones. It has often been interpreted as the earliest diverging member of Goniopholididae, but other studies have recovered it in various other positions.

== Description ==
The holotype skull (TxVP 43631-1) that would be named Calsoyasuchus was discovered in 1997 by members of an expedition composed of crews from Texas Memorial Museum of the University of Texas at Austin, the Museum of Comparative Zoology at Harvard University, and the Seba Dalkai Navajo Nation School. It was found in the middle third of the silty facies of the Kayenta Formation, near the Adeii Eechii Cliffs. The skull is missing the lower jaws, part of the palate, most of the suspensorium (the bones that make up the region where the upper and lower jaws articulate), and the occiput and braincase. Sutures between the skull bones are mostly fused. As preserved, it is about 38.0 centimeters (15.0 in) long, making its owner a moderately sized animal.

The skull was long, low, and curved so that both extremities were higher than the middle. The premaxilla bones that formed the end of the snout were enlarged to form a wide tip; there were at least four teeth in the right premaxilla and five in the left. The left maxilla (main tooth-bearing bone of the upper jaw) is more complete than the right, and had at least 29 teeth. There was a deep groove along the midline of the nasals and the frontals; the frontals were fused into a single bone, as is seen in other adult mesoeucrocodylians. Unlike derived neosuchians, it had external antorbital fenestrae. Tykoski and colleagues subjected the skull to CT scanning, which revealed internal cavities and air passages, and showed that it had a double-walled secondary palate similar to that of true crocodylians, and similar pneumatic cavities as well.

== Phylogeny ==
Tykoski and colleagues performed a cladistic phylogenetic analysis with their new taxon, and found that it grouped with Goniopholis, Sunosuchus, and, most closely, with Eutretauranosuchus in a weakly supported clade, Goniopholididae. They noted that the skull of Calsoyasuchus is very similar to some goniopholid skulls from the younger, Upper Jurassic Morrison Formation. Calsoyasuchus pushes back the earliest occurrence of goniopholids from the Late Jurassic into the Early Jurassic, and not only helps to bridge a temporal gap between groups of crocodyliforms, but also a morphological gap. It also implies that some groups of crocodyliforms have long undiscovered histories.

In 2011, Calsoyasuchus was recovered as the basalmost goniopholidid and the sister taxon to all other goniopholidids.

- Neosuchia
  - Atoposauridae
    - Theriosuchus pusillus
    - Theriosuchus guimarotae
  - - - Rugosuchus
      - - Bernissartia
        - Eusuchia
    - - Stolokrosuchus
      - - - Tethysuchia
          - Thalattosuchia
        - Goniopholididae
          - Calsoyasuchus valliceps
          - - - "Goniopholis" phuwiangensis
              - - Eutretauranosuchus delfi
                - "Sunosuchus" junggarensis
              - - Sunosuchus miaoi
                - Sunosuchus thailandicus
            - - Siamosuchus phuphokensis
              - - Amphicotylus lucasii
                - - Denazinosuchus kirtlandicus
                  - Nannosuchus gracilidens
                  - - - Hulkepholis (Hulke's goniopholidid)
                      - - Anteophthalmosuchus (Hooley’s goniopholidid)
                        - Anteophthalmosuchus (Dollo’s goniopholidid)
                    - Goniopholis
                      - Goniopholis baryglyphaeus
                      - - Goniopholis kiplingi
                        - Goniopholis simus

Its placement as a goniopholid is not uncontested. A cladistic analysis of Crocodylomorpha published by Wilberg et al. (2019) in their discussion of crocodylomorph paleobiology recovers Calsoyasuchus as a close relative of the basal mesoeucrocodyliform Hsisosuchus. A 2022 analysis found it to be the sister group of Thalattosuchia.

== Paleoecology ==
During the Sinemurian and Pliensbachian ages of the Early Jurassic, the Kayenta Formation had a diverse fauna, with the remains of caecilians, frogs, turtles, at least five other taxa of crocodylomorphs, pterosaurs, theropod, sauropodomorph, and ornithischian dinosaurs, and early relatives of mammals (tritylodontids and morganucodontids).
