= Coelosuchus =

Coelosuchus Temporal range: Late Cretaceous

Scientific classification
- Domain: Eukaryota
- Kingdom: Animalia
- Phylum: Chordata
- Class: Reptilia
- Clade: Archosauria
- Clade: Pseudosuchia
- Clade: Crocodylomorpha
- Clade: Crocodyliformes
- Family: †Goniopholididae
- Genus: †Coelosuchus; Williston, 1906

Type species
- †Coelosuchus reedii Williston, 1906

Extinct genus of reptiles

Coelosuchus is an extinct genus of goniopholidid mesoeucrocodylian. Fossils have been found from the Graneros Shale of the Benton Group in Wyoming, and are of Cenomanian age. It was slightly over 1 meter in length.
