= Symptosuchus =

Symptosuchus Temporal range: Late Cretaceous

Scientific classification
- Domain: Eukaryota
- Kingdom: Animalia
- Phylum: Chordata
- Class: Reptilia
- Clade: Archosauria
- Clade: Pseudosuchia
- Clade: Crocodylomorpha
- Clade: Crocodyliformes
- Family: †Goniopholididae
- Genus: †Symptosuchus; Ameghino, 1899

Type species
- †Symptosuchus contortidens Ameghino, 1899

Extinct genus of reptiles

Symptosuchus is an extinct genus of goniopholidid mesoeucrocodylian. It is known from the Late Cretaceous of Argentina. Argentine paleontologist Florentino Ameghino named the genus in 1899, along with the type species S. contortidens. It was formally described by Carlos Rusconi in 1934.
