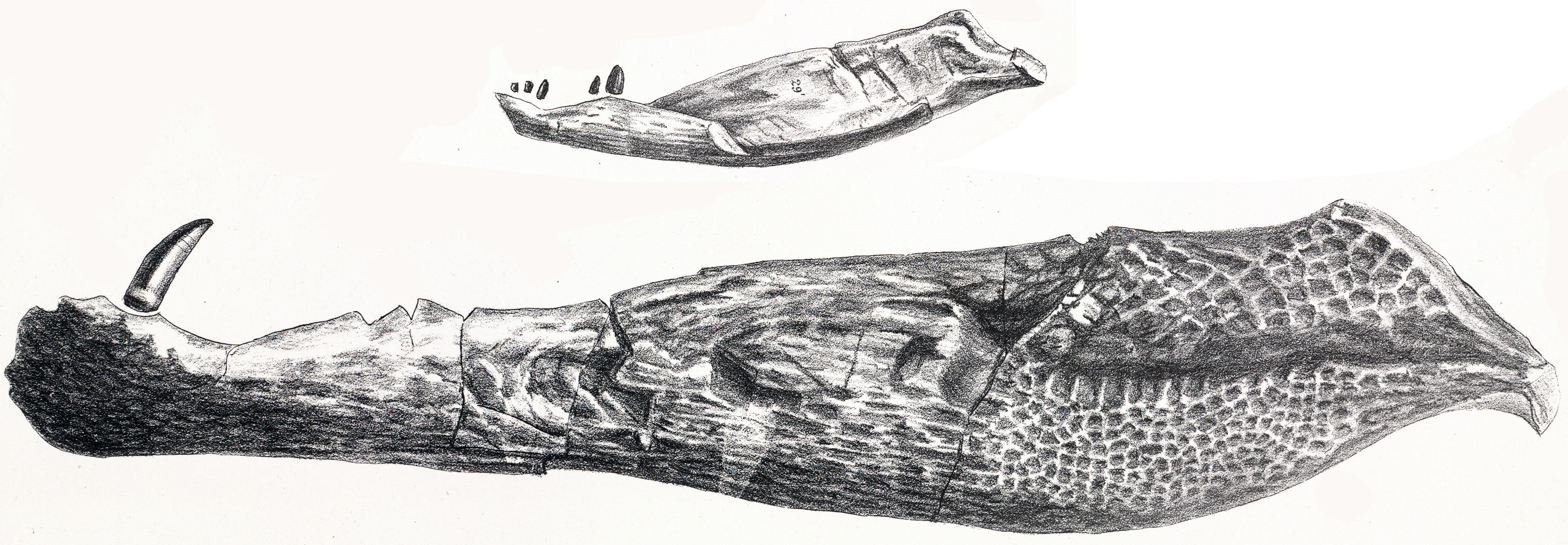
- Ramus of O. minor and O. major

Scientific classification
- Domain: Eukaryota
- Kingdom: Animalia
- Phylum: Chordata
- Class: Reptilia
- Clade: Archosauria
- Clade: Pseudosuchia
- Clade: Crocodylomorpha
- Clade: Crocodyliformes
- Family: †Goniopholididae
- Genus: †Oweniasuchus; Woodward, 1885

Species
- †O. major Owen, 1879 (type); †?O. minor Owen, 1879; †O. lusitanicus Sauvage, 1897; †O. pulchelus Jonet, 1981

= Oweniasuchus =

Oweniasuchus Temporal range: 145.5–93.5 Ma Berriasian - Cenomanian

Extinct genus of reptiles

Oweniasuchus is an extinct genus of goniopholidid mesoeucrocodylian. Remains have been found from England and Portugal that are Cretaceous in age.

The type species of Oweniasuchus is O. major from the Early Cretaceous Upper Purbeck Group in Beccles, England. It is known from a mandibular ramus that was first described as Brachydectes minor by Richard Owen in 1879. Because the generic name Brachydectes was preoccupied by the Carboniferous amphibian Brachydectes, the species was reassigned to the new genus Oweniasuchus by Arthur Smith Woodward in 1885, along with another species, B. minor, also described by Owen from material from Beccles. Recently, O. major has been considered a nomen dubium because the holotype specimen (BMNH 48304) is too fragmentary to provide an adequate diagnosis. O. minor has since been proposed to be a synonym of the atoposaurid Theriosuchus pusillus. Two other species, O. lusitanicus and O. pulchelus, are known from the Late Cretaceous of Portugal.
