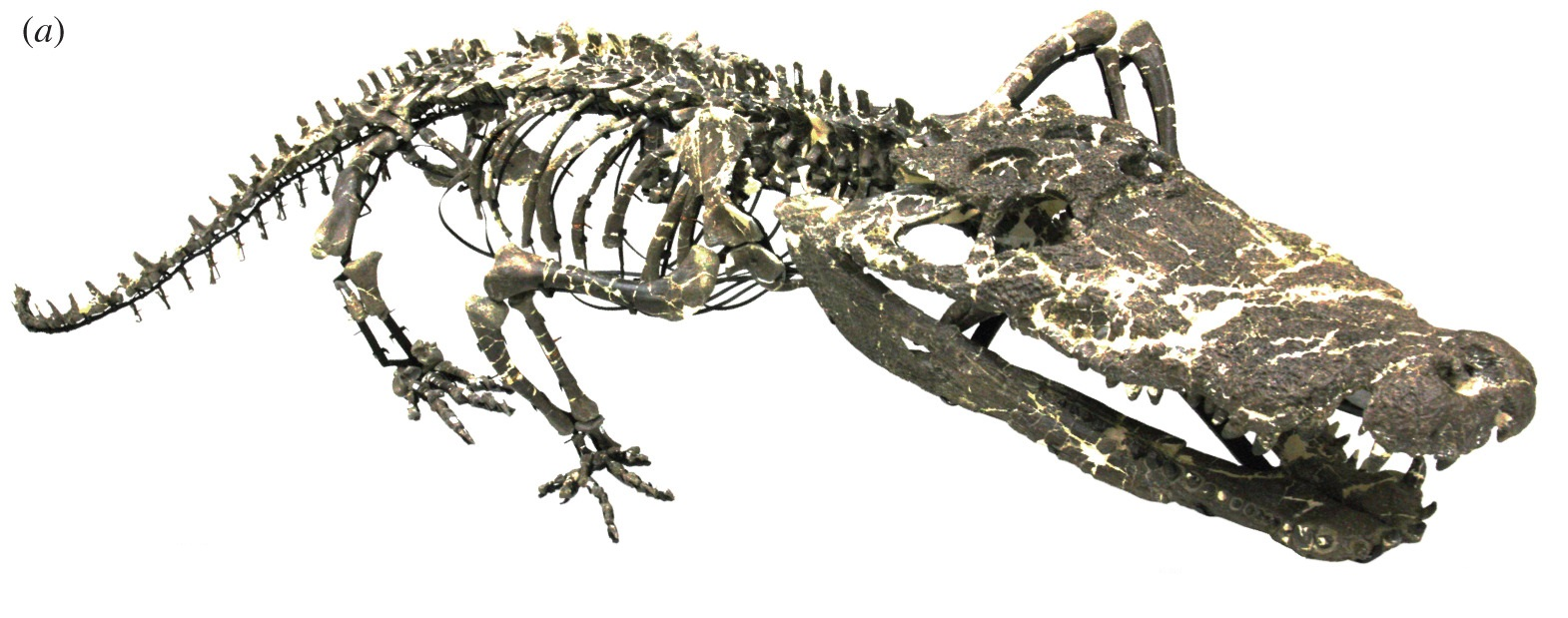
- Skeleton of Amphicotylus milesi from the Late Jurassic of North America

Scientific classification
- Kingdom: Animalia
- Phylum: Chordata
- Class: Reptilia
- Clade: Pseudosuchia
- Clade: Crocodylomorpha
- Clade: Neosuchia
- Family: †Goniopholididae; Cope, 1875

Subgroups
- †Amphicotylus; †Anteophthalmosuchus; †Calsoyasuchus?; †Coelosuchus; †Dakotasuchus; †Denazinosuchus; †Diplosaurus; †Eutretauranosuchus; †Goniopholis; †Hulkepholis; †Nannosuchus; †Ophiussasuchus; †Oweniasuchus; †Paarthurnax; †Pinacosuchus?; †Siamosuchus; †Sunosuchus; †Symptosuchus?; †Woodbinesuchus

= Goniopholididae =

Goniopholididae Temporal range: Middle Jurassic–Late Cretaceous Possible Early Jurassic record if Calsoyasuchus is a goniopholidid

Extinct family of reptiles

Goniopholididae is an extinct family of moderate-sized semi-aquatic neosuchian crocodyliformes. Their bodyplan and morphology are convergent on living crocodilians. They lived across Laurasia (Asia, Europe and North America) between the Middle Jurassic (possibly Early Jurassic, see below) and the Late Cretaceous.

== Description ==
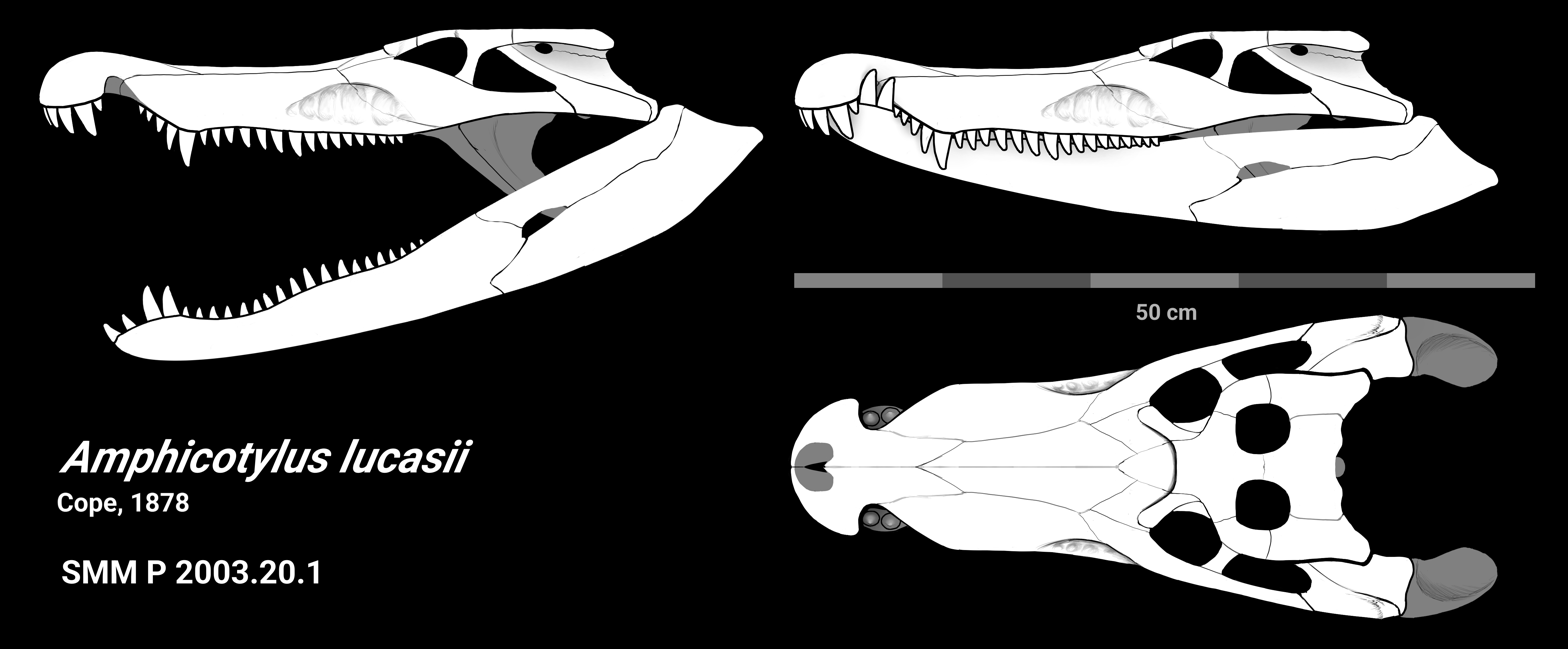
Skull of Amphicotylus lucasii

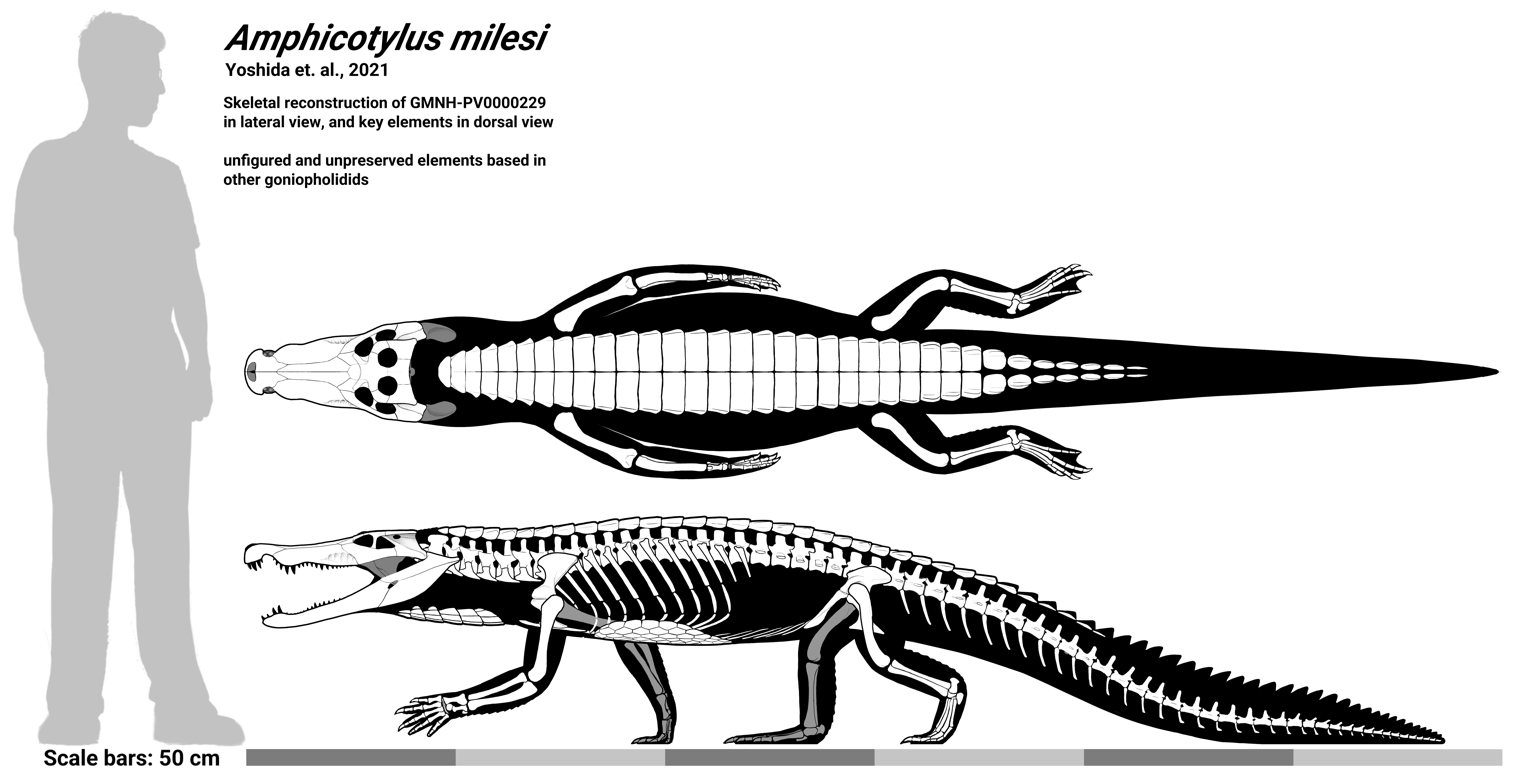
Skeletal reconstruction of Amphicotylus milesi

The dorsal armour of goniopholidids is composed of two rows of paired osteoderms (as opposed to the four main pairs present in living crocodilians and other eusuchians), which are rectangular in shape and wider than they are long, with the lateral margins ventrally deflected and an anterior process for a 'peg and groove' articulation. Unlike modern crocodilians they have ventral osteoderms as well. Their forelimbs are also proportionally very long, particularly in the humeri and wrist bones, being as long or longer than the hindlimbs, the opposite of the condition seen in modern crocodilians. Some like Anteophthalmosuchus also have forwardly oriented eyes, as opposed to the dorsally oriented eyes seen in modern forms. These suggest multiple biomechanical differences from modern species.

== Ecology ==
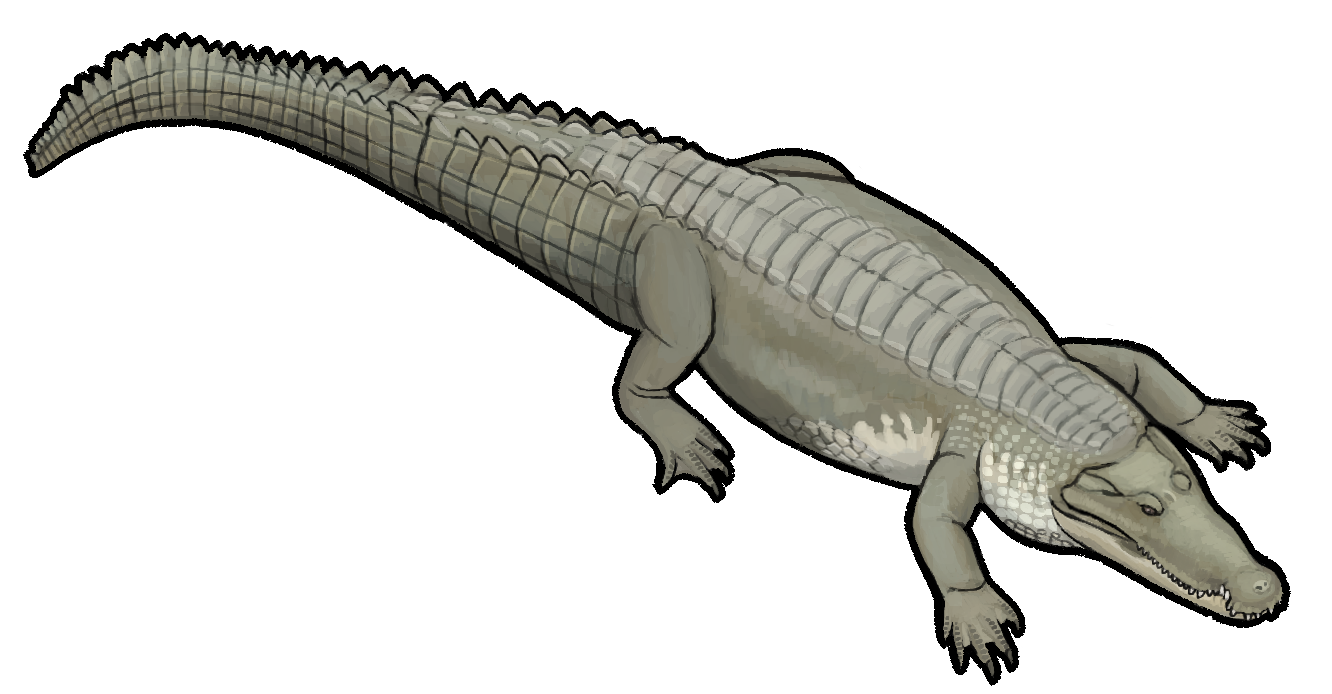
Life Restoration of Siamosuchus phuphokensis

Goniopholidids likely had a similar ecology to modern crocodilians as semi-aquatic ambush predators. Analysis of isotopes and bone histology suggests that goniopholidids were ectothermic (cold-blooded) like modern crocodilians.

== Evolutionary history ==
Goniopholidids have only been found in Laurasia (Asia, Europe and North America). The oldest possible member of the group is Calsoyasuchus from the Early Jurassic of North America. However, its placement is disputed, with some studies recovering it as only distantly related to goniopholidids. The goniopholidids were present across Eurasia during the Middle Jurassic and were widespread in North America during the Late Jurassic and continued to remain prominent across Laurasia during the Early Cretaceous. Goniopolidids persisted into the late Upper Cretaceous in North America based on Denazinosuchus, from the Campanian-Maastrichtian of New Mexico, which is only known from fragmentary remains, and has been disputed as a member of the group, as well as remains of an unnamed goniopholidid from the Campanian aged Aguja Formation of Texas.

== Classification ==
The following cladogram simplified after an analysis presented by Marco Brandalise de Andrade and colleagues in 2011.

- Neosuchia
  - Atoposauridae
    - Theriosuchus pusillus
    - Theriosuchus guimarotae
  - - - Rugosuchus
      - - Bernissartia
        - Eusuchia
    - - Stolokrosuchus
      - - - Tethysuchia
          - Thalattosuchia
        - Goniopholididae
          - Calsoyasuchus valliceps
          - - - "Goniopholis" phuwiangensis
              - - Eutretauranosuchus delfi
                - "Sunosuchus" junggarensis
              - - Sunosuchus miaoi
                - Chalawan thailandicus
            - - Siamosuchus phuphokensis
              - - Amphicotylus lucasii
                - - Denazinosuchus kirtlandicus
                  - Nannosuchus gracilidens
                  - - - Hulkepholis willetti
                      - - Anteophthalmosuchus
                        - Dollo's goniopholidid
                    - Goniopholis
                      - Goniopholis baryglyphaeus
                      - - Goniopholis kiplingi
                        - Goniopholis simus
