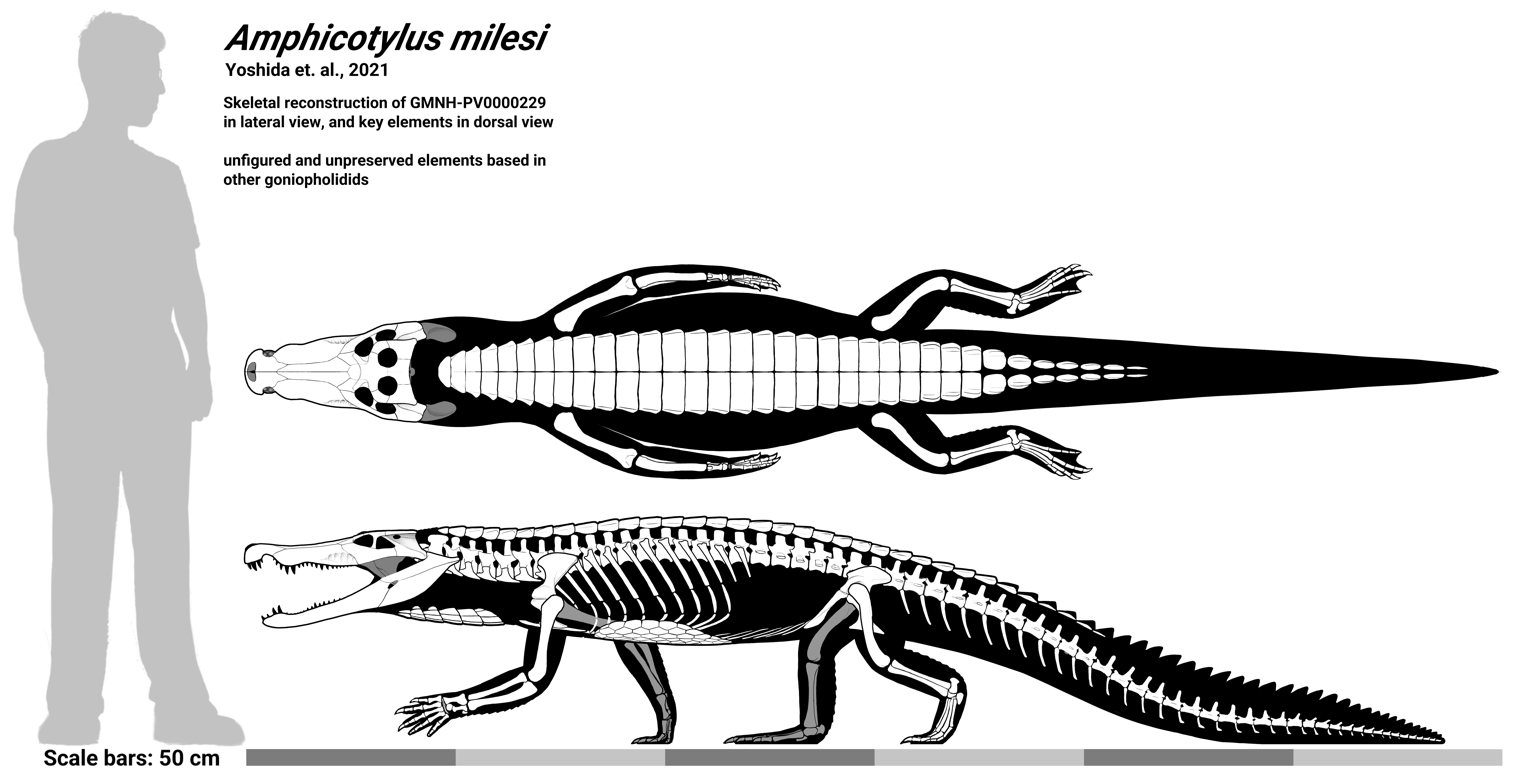
- Skeletal reconstruction and size comparison of Amphicotylus milesi (GMNH-PV0000229)
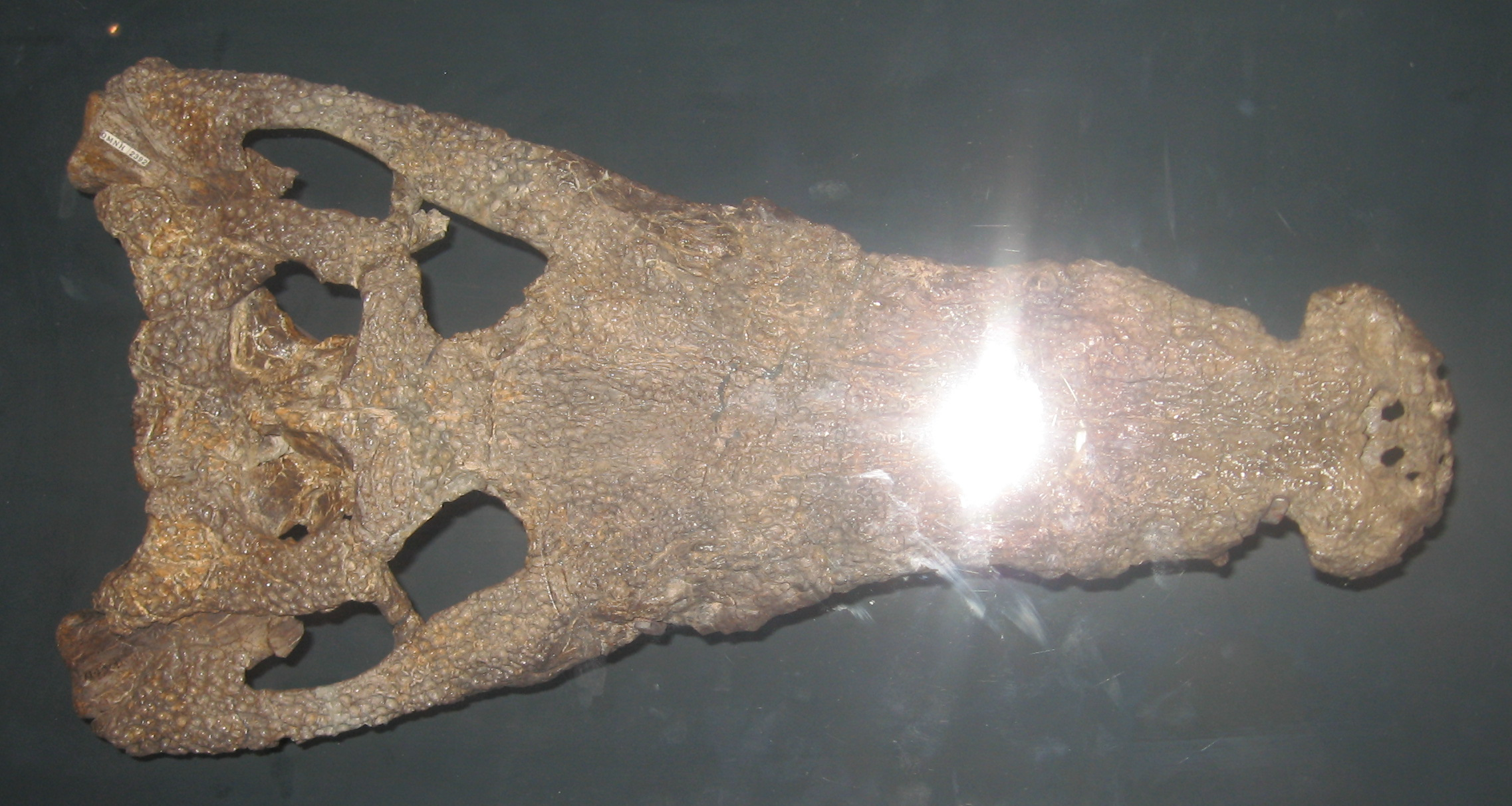
- Skull (OMNH 2392) of Amphicotylus stovalli from Oklahoma

Scientific classification
- Kingdom: Animalia
- Phylum: Chordata
- Class: Reptilia
- Clade: Pseudosuchia
- Clade: Crocodylomorpha
- Family: †Goniopholididae
- Genus: †Amphicotylus; Cope, 1878

Type species
- †Amphicotylus lucasii Cope, 1878

Species
- †A. felix (Marsh, 1877); †A. gilmorei? (Holland, 1905); †A. lucasii Cope, 1878; †A. stovalli (Mook, 1964); †A. milesi Yoshida et al., 2021

= Amphicotylus =

Amphicotylus Temporal range: Late Jurassic, Tithonian

Extinct genus of reptiles

Amphicotylus is an extinct genus of goniopholidid mesoeucrocodylian from the Tithonian of Colorado, Wyoming, and Oklahoma. It was described in 1878.

== Discovery and species ==
Amphicotylus was first described by Edward Drinker Cope in 1878 based on dorsal and lumbar vertebrae, ribs and osteoderms. Based on these remains, found in the same locality as Camarasaurus supremus, Cope determined the animal to have been smaller than the extant American Alligator and named the species A. lucasii after Superintendent Lucas who initially made the discovery. Cope also collected skull material from the same locality and level, however did not refer it to Amphicotylus. The cranial material was examined by Charles C. Mook in 1942 who referred it to the type species not only on the basis of its locality, but also its matching size, general morphological characters and the absence of any other crocodilian remains from the area. Mook furthermore uses this skull to establish a provisional neotype to account for the fragmentary nature of the original material described by Cope.

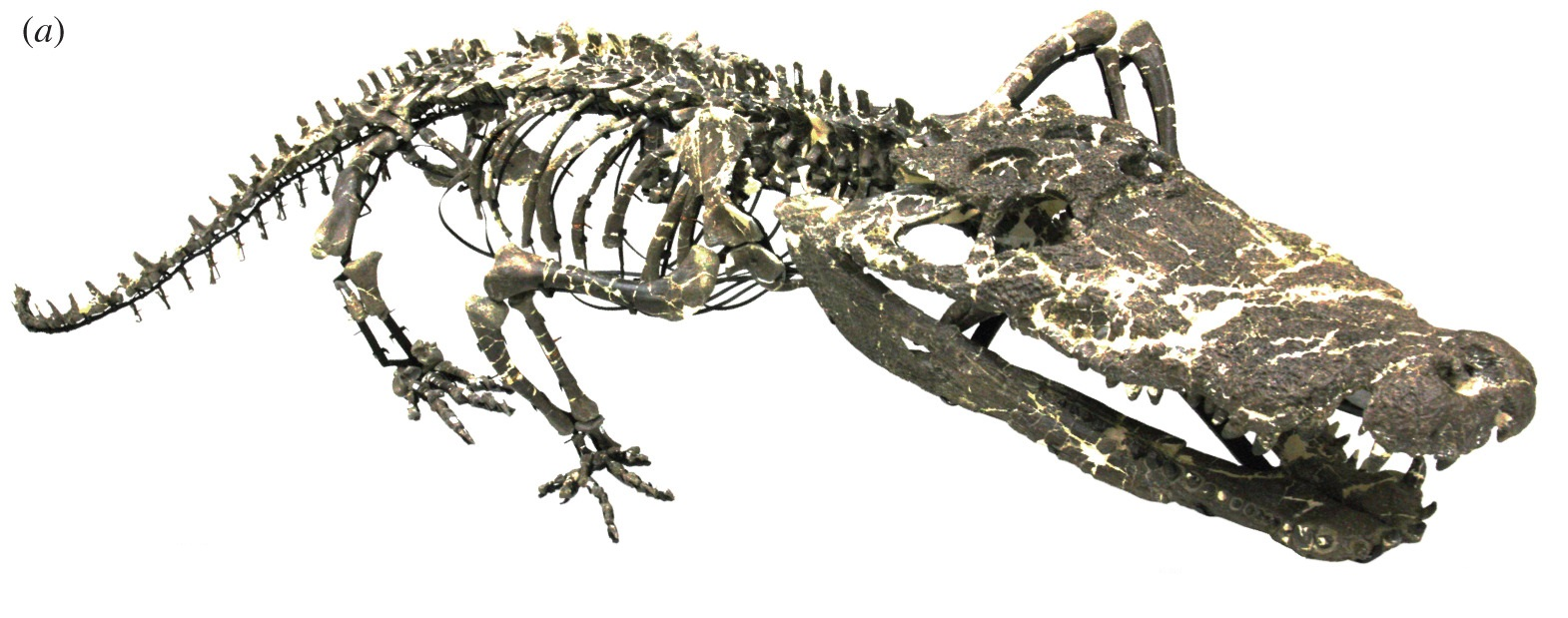
Mounted skeleton of Amphicotylus milesi (GMNH-PV000029) at the Gunma Museum of Natural History

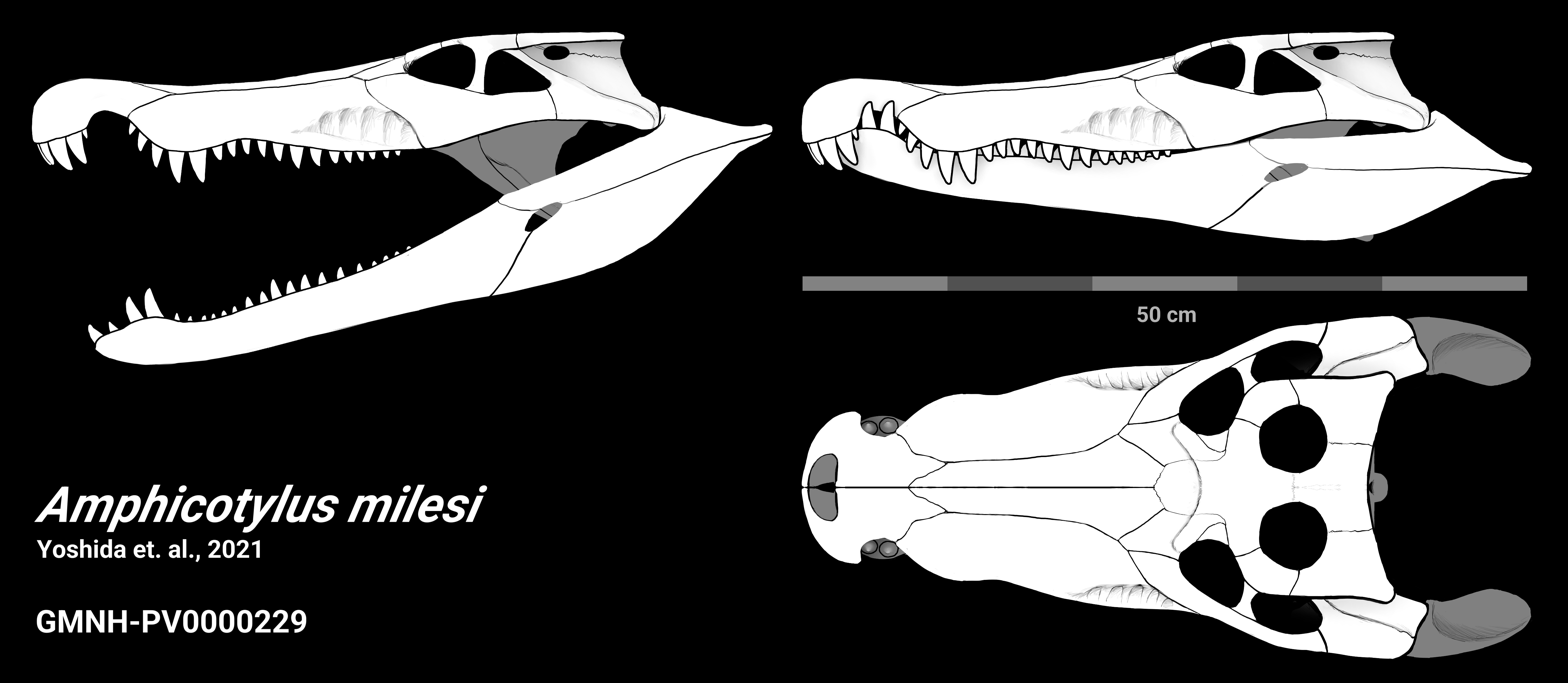
Skull diagram of Amphicotylus milesi

In the 1930s the Works Progress Administration discovered further remains in Oklahoma which were initially investigated by J. W. Stovall, noting similarities to Amphicotylus gilmorei. The remains were officially described by Mook in 1964 as a species of Goniopholis, Goniopholis stovalli. In 2012 Eric Randall Allen argued that the goniopholidids found in the Morrison Formation differ significantly from their European counterparts in the anatomy of the palate, with the choanae fully splitting the palatines unlike in the taxa from the UK and mainland Europe. Consequently, Allen reasons that Goniopholis should exclusively refer to European forms while Amphicotylus should serve as a constituent for Morrison goniopholidids previously referred to Goniopholis, such as "Goniopholis" felix. Furthermore, it is noted that there are no significant differences between A. lucasii and the only known material of A. gilmorei, with the only notable morphological character being artificially created by breakage, rendering it a junior synonym of the genus' type species.

Excavations in the East Camarasaurus Quarry, Wyoming, in 1993 yielded the largest and most complete goniopholidid skeleton found to date. Since 1996 the fossil has been exhibited and stored in the Gunma Museum of Natural History in Japan before it was described by Yoshida et al. in 2021 as Amphicotylus milesi, in honor of Clifford Miles for his contribution to the excavation and museum curation.

== Description ==
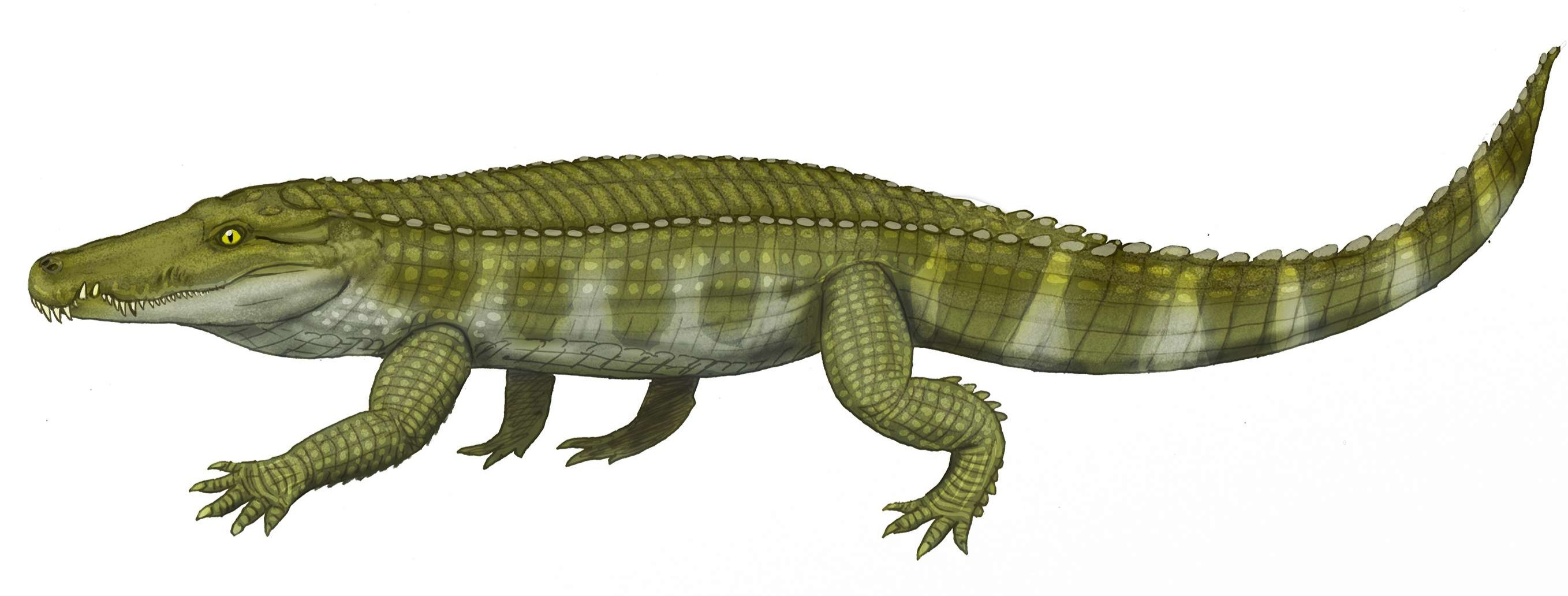
Life reconstruction

Amphicotylus had a roughly triangular, platyrostral skull similar in shape to that of modern crocodilians. They differ from European goniopholidids in several morphological characters, most notably the anatomy of the palate. In members of Amphicotylus, the palatines are completely separated from one another by the choana while in Goniopholis the palatines make broad contact prior to the choana. This trait is shared by Eutretauranosuchus. Amphicotylus milesi is the largest species with a skull length of 43 cm.

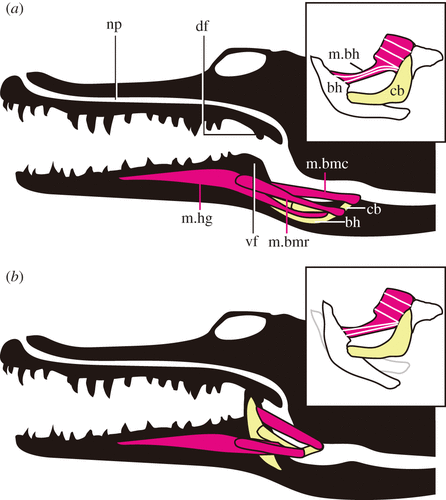
Crocodilian respiratory system in a Chinese alligator (Alligator sinensis)

The anatomy of the palate and hyoid in A. milesi show similar adaptations to extant crocodilians, with the anterior portion of the elongated choana possibly being covered in soft tissue similar to the state observed in embryos of American alligators. Based on the morphology of the hyoid apparatus and its muscle attachments, A. milesi would have been able to raise the ventral fold of the gullar valve, separating narial and oral passages. This adaptation for semi-aquatic life would have allowed Amphicotylus and other Neosuchians to completely cut out the oral cavity from respiration, giving it the ability to open its mouth underwater while continuing to breathe as long as the nares are above the surface. This pushes the development of a crocodilian-like respiratory system to the beginnings of Neosuchian evolution in the Jurassic period.

== Phylogeny ==
Studies have repeatedly found Amphicotylus to be nested deep within Goniopholididae, typically located just outside the clade that contains most European members of the group. Denazinosuchus, a late Cretaceous member of Goniopholididae, was recovered as a sister taxon to Amphicotylus by Puértolas-Pascual et al. 2015, but as part of the "European clade" by Yoshida et al. 2021. Yoshida et al. also include Sunosuchus thailandicus without following the revisions by Martin et al. 2013 that found it to be a distinct genus of pholidosaurid, Chalawan thailandicus. The phylogenetic tree recovered by Yoshida et al. is depicted below.

- - Goniopholididae
    - Calsoyasuchus
    - - - - - Eutretauranosuchus
            - Sunosuchus junggarensis
          - - Sunosuchus miaoi
            - Sunosuchus thailandicus
      - - - Siamosuchus phuphokensis
          - Siamosuchus
        - - Amphicotylus lucasii
          - - Amphicotylus stovalli
            - Amphicotylus milesi
          - - Nannosuchus
            - - Goniopholis baryglyphaeus
              - - Goniopholis simus
                - Goniopholis kiplingi
            - - Hulke goniopholidid
              - - Dolloa goniopholidid
                - Anteophthalmosuchus hooleyi
            - Denazinosuchus
