= Denazinosuchus =

Denazinosuchus Temporal range: Late Cretaceous, 84.9–70.6 Ma

Scientific classification
- Kingdom: Animalia
- Phylum: Chordata
- Class: Reptilia
- Clade: Archosauria
- Clade: Pseudosuchia
- Clade: Crocodylomorpha
- Family: †Goniopholididae
- Genus: †Denazinosuchus; Lucas & Sullivan, 2003

Type species
- †Denazinosuchus kirtlandicus (Wiman, 1932 [originally Goniopholis kirtlandicus])

Extinct genus of reptiles

Denazinosuchus is a genus of goniopholidid mesoeucrocodylian. Its fossils have been recovered from the Upper Cretaceous Fruitland Formation and Kirtland Formation (late Campanian-early Maastrichtian) of the San Juan Basin, New Mexico. It is the most abundant and readily identifiable mesoeucrocodylian of the San Juan Basin, mostly due to its distinctive subrectangular, flattened, and sparsely pitted bony armor. It was first described in 1932 by Carl Wiman on the basis of a skull as a species of Goniopholis, G. kirtlandicus. Spencer G. Lucas and Robert M. Sullivan redescribed the species in 2003 and gave it its own genus, Denazinosuchus. To date, Denazinosuchus is only known from skull material, armor, and a thigh bone.

== Phylogyny ==
In their 2025 description of Paarthurnax, Platt and colleagues recovered this taxon as the sister to Denazinosuchus. Their results recovered Anteophthalmosuchus as the sister taxon to these two genera. These results are displayed in the cladogram below:

- †Goniopholididae
  - †Calsoyasuchus
  - - †Sunosuchus
    - - - †Amphicotylus stovalli
        - - †Eutretauranosuchus
          - - †Amphicotylus gilmorei
            - †Amphicotylus lucasii
      - - †Goniopholis baryglyphaeus
        - - †Goniopholis simus
          - - †Goniopholis kiplingi
            - - †Hulkepholis
              - - - †Anteophthalmosuchus
                  - - †Paarthurnax
                    - †Denazinosuchus
                - - TxVP 42536-2
                  - †Deltasuchus
                  - †Paluxysuchus
