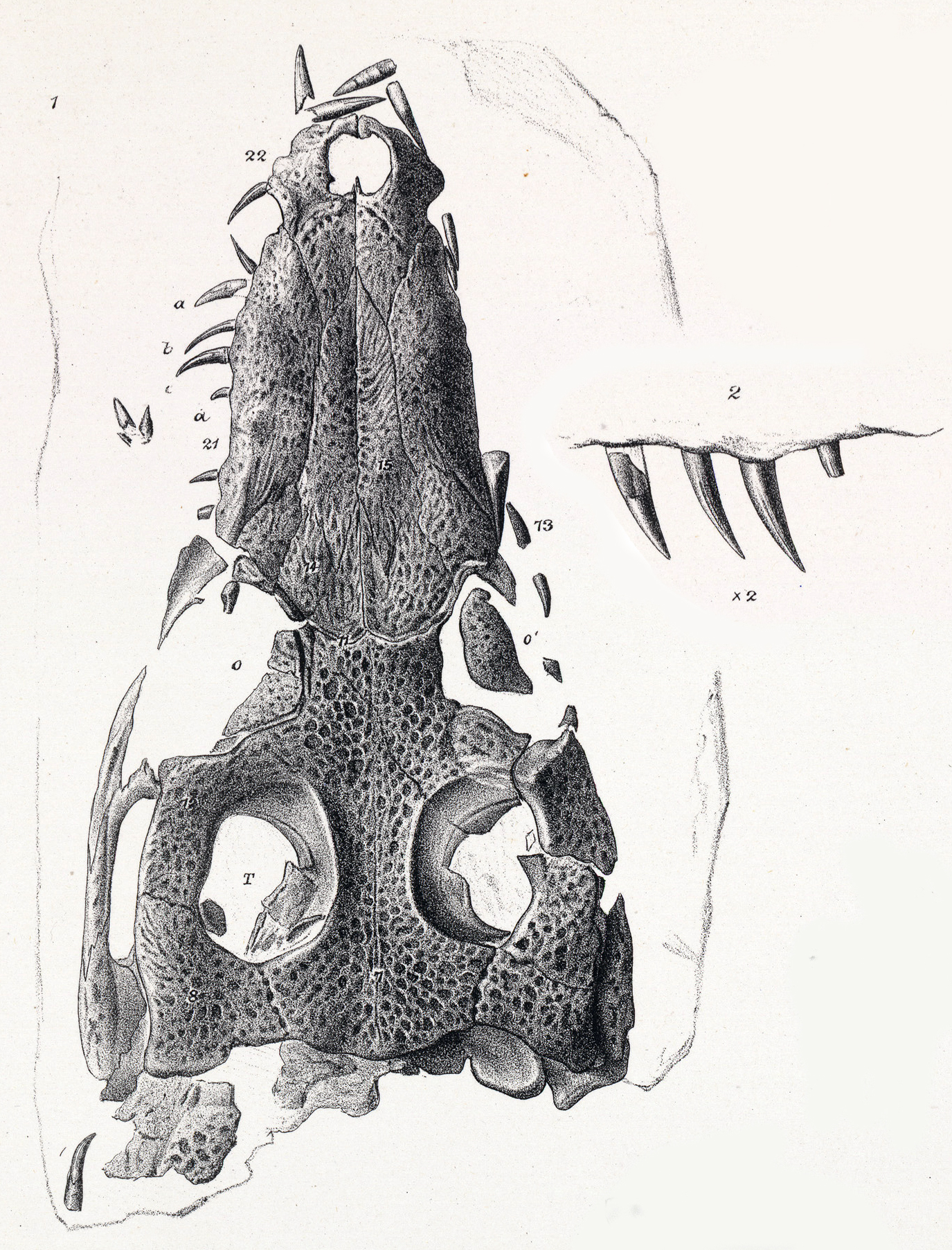
- Skull and close-up of teeth of holotype BMNH 48217

Scientific classification
- Domain: Eukaryota
- Kingdom: Animalia
- Phylum: Chordata
- Class: Reptilia
- Clade: Archosauria
- Clade: Pseudosuchia
- Clade: Crocodylomorpha
- Clade: Crocodyliformes
- Family: †Goniopholididae
- Genus: †Nannosuchus; Salisbury, 2002

Type species
- †Goniopholis gracilidens Owen, 1879

= Nannosuchus =

Nannosuchus Temporal range: Early Cretaceous, Berriasian

Extinct genus of reptiles

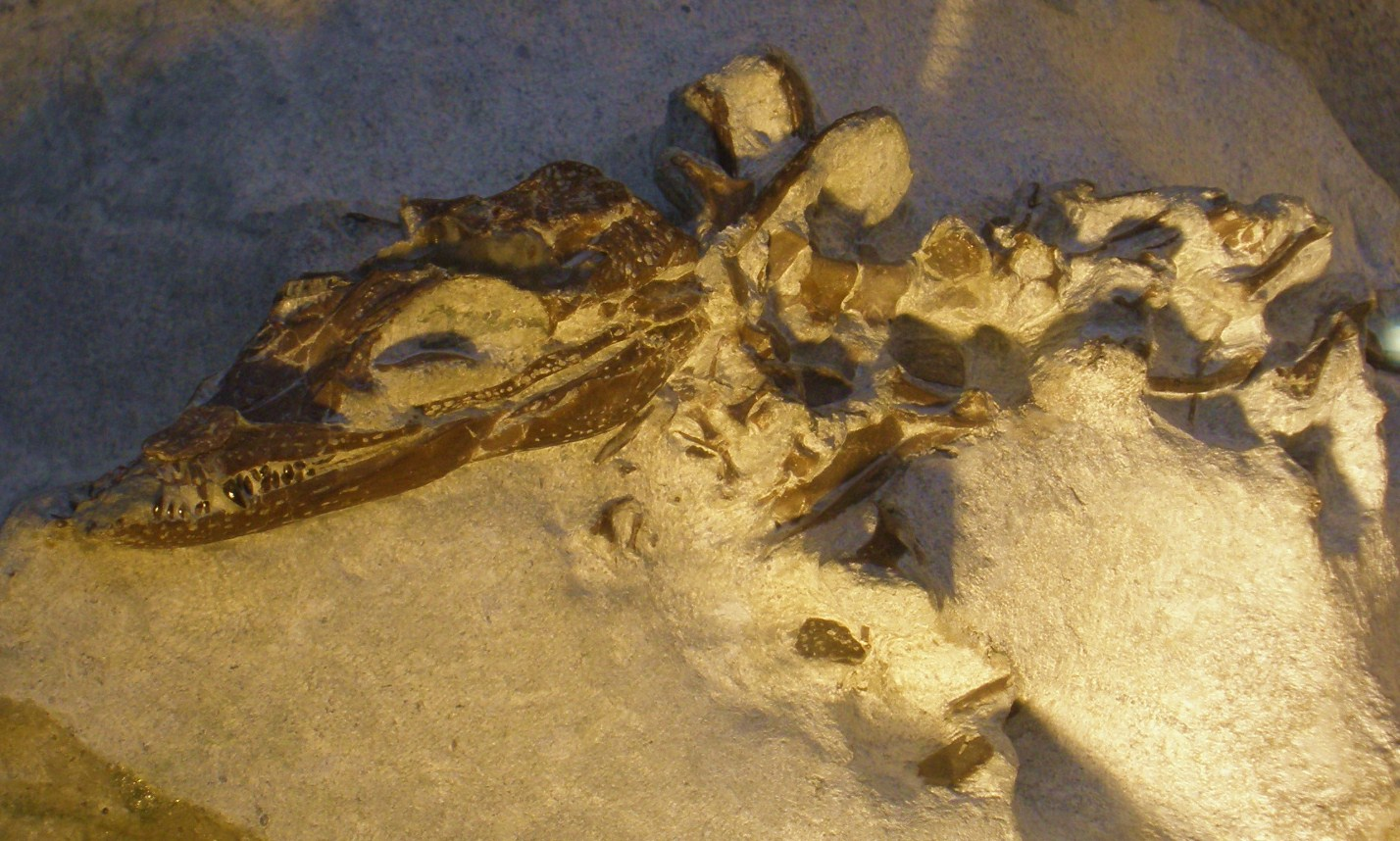
N. sp. fossil

Nannosuchus (meaning "dwarf crocodile") is an extinct genus of goniopholidid mesoeucrocodylian from the Berriasian Middle Purbeck Formation of England that was originally named as a species of Goniopholis. The type species, N. gracilidens, is based on the holotype BMNH 48217, scattered fragmentary remains that include parts of the skull and various other postcranial elements described in 1879.
