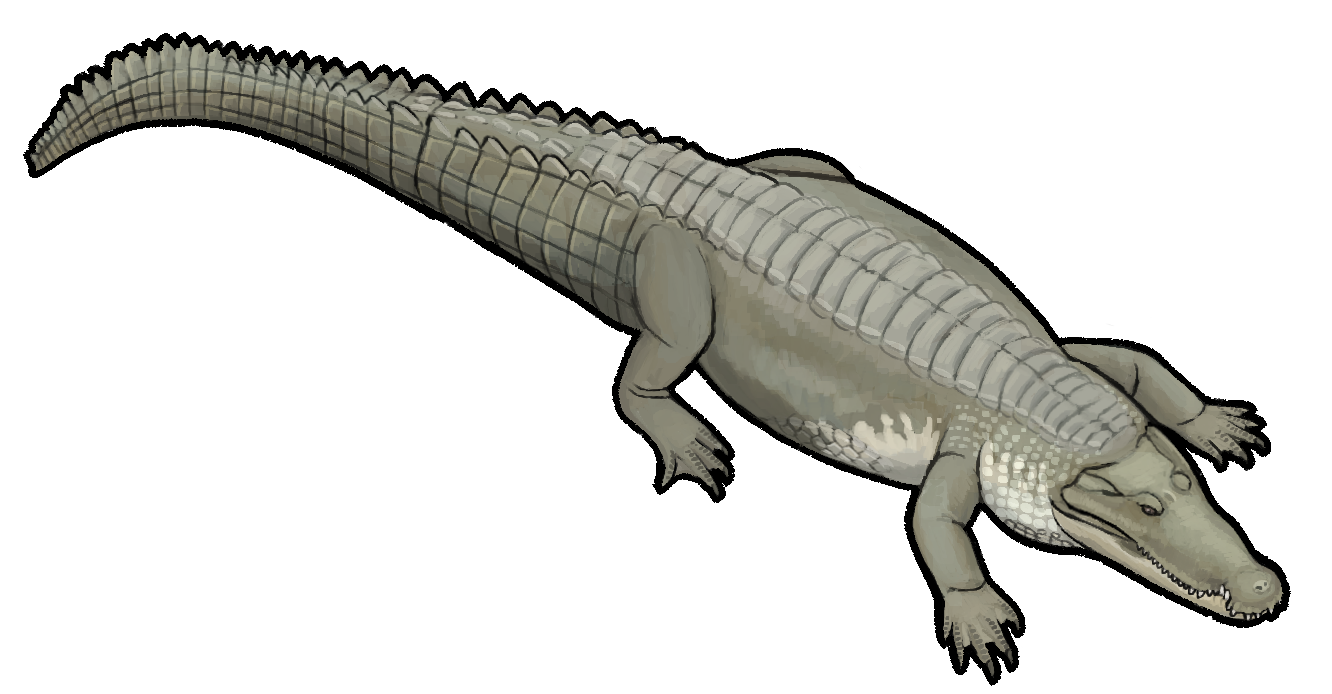
- Life restoration
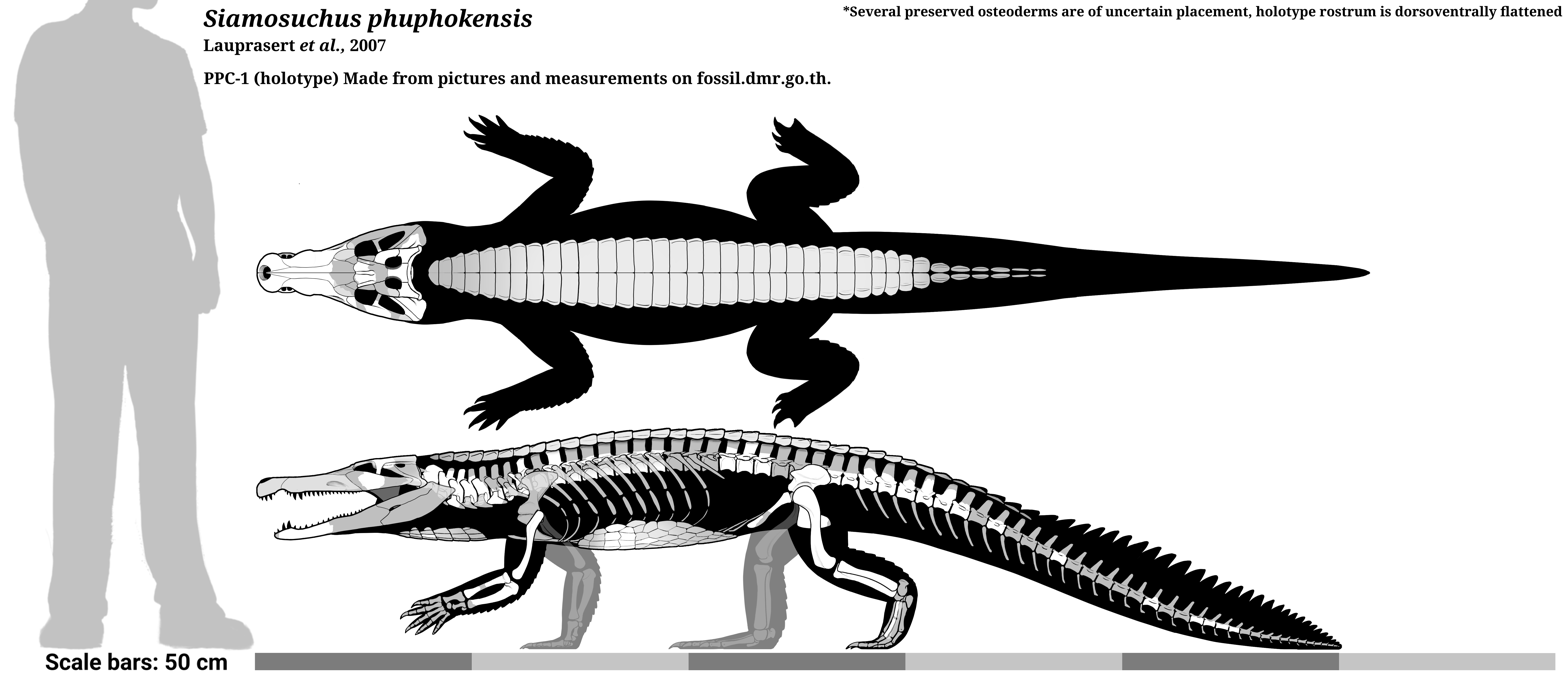
- Skeletal reconstruction

Scientific classification
- Kingdom: Animalia
- Phylum: Chordata
- Class: Reptilia
- Clade: Pseudosuchia
- Clade: Crocodylomorpha
- Family: †Goniopholididae
- Genus: †Siamosuchus; Lauprasert et al., 2007

Type species
- †Siamosuchus phuphokensis Lauprasert et al., 2007

= Siamosuchus =

Siamosuchus Temporal range: Early Cretaceous

Extinct genus of reptiles

Siamosuchus is a genus of goniopholidid mesoeucrocodylian. Its fossils have been recovered from the early Aptian-aged (Early Cretaceous) Sao Khua Formation of eastern Thailand. It is known from a partial skull, most of the right half of the postcranial skeleton, and some bony scutes. Siamosuchus was described by Lauprasert and colleagues in 2007. The type species is S. phuphokensis. Siamosuchus may be closely related to the European genus Goniopholis.
