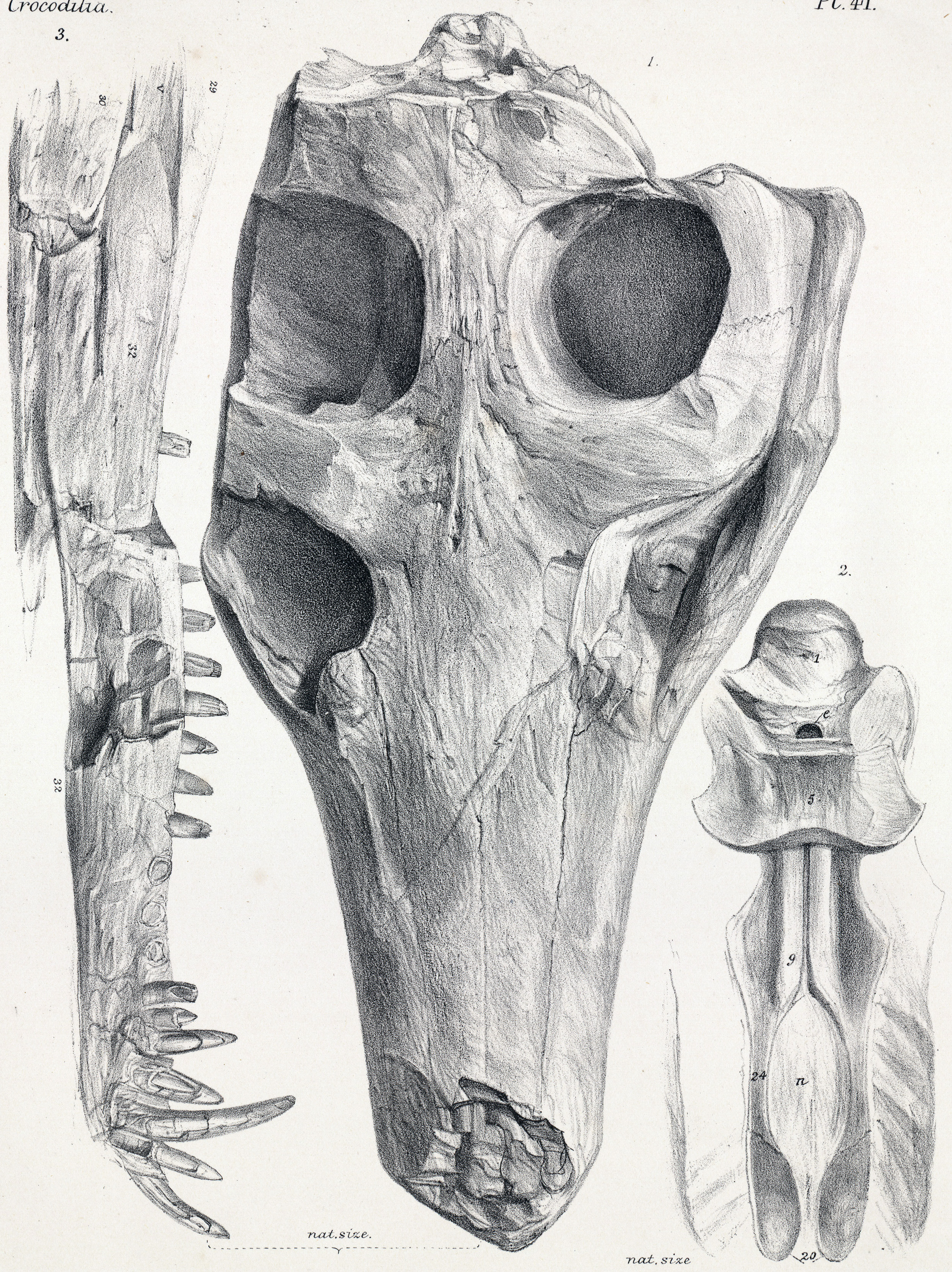
- Pholidosaurus purbeckensis skull

Scientific classification
- Kingdom: Animalia
- Phylum: Chordata
- Class: Reptilia
- Clade: Archosauria
- Clade: Pseudosuchia
- Clade: Crocodylomorpha
- Clade: Neosuchia
- Suborder: †Tethysuchia; Buffetaut, 1982

Families
- †Dyrosauridae; †Pholidosauridae

= Tethysuchia =

Tethysuchia Temporal range: Bathonian–Ypresian

Extinct clade of reptiles

Tethysuchia is an extinct clade of neosuchian mesoeucrocodylian crocodylomorphs from the late Middle Jurassic (Bathonian stage) to the Early Eocene (Ypresian stage) of Asia, Europe, North America and South America. It was named by the French paleontologist Eric Buffetaut in 1982 as a suborder. Tethysuchia was considered to be a synonym of Dyrosauridae or Pholidosauridae for many years. In most phylogenetic analyses the node Dyrosauridae+Pholidosauridae was strongly supported. De Andrade et al. (2011) suggested that Tethysuchia be resurrected for that node. They defined it as a node-based taxon "composed of Pholidosaurus purbeckensis (Mansel-Pleydell, 1888) and Dyrosaurus phosphaticus (Thomas, 1893), their common ancestor and all its descendants". In their analysis they found that the support for Tethysuchia is actually stronger than the support for Thalattosuchia. The following cladogram shows the position of Tethysuchia among the Neosuchia (with respect to the definition of Neosuchia used by this study).

- Neosuchia
  - Atoposauridae
    - Theriosuchus pusillus
    - Theriosuchus guimarotae
  - - - Rugosuchus
      - - Bernissartia
        - Eusuchia
    - - Stolokrosuchus
      - - Goniopholididae
        - - Thalattosuchia
          - Tethysuchia
            - Elosuchidae
              - - Sarcosuchus hartti
                - Sarcosuchus imperator
              - - Vectisuchus
                - Elosuchus
            - - Pholidosauridae
                Pholidosaurus schaumburgensis
              - Dyrosauridae
                - Congosaurus
                - Guarinisuchus
                - - Dyrosaurus maghribensis
                  - Dyrosaurus phosphaticus

The cladogram below is from study in 2024 by Forêt and colleagues on the interrelationships of tethysuchians.

- Tethysuchia
  - Pholidosauridae
    - Meridiosaurus vallisparadisi
    - - - Pholidosaurus cherves
        - - Pholidosaurus purbeckensis
          - Pholidosaurus schaumbergensis
      - - - Woodbinesuchus byersmauricei
          - Oceanosuchus boecensis
          - Sabinosuchus coahuilensis
        - - - Sarcosuchus imperator
            - Sarcosuchus hartii
            - Chalawan thailandicus
          - - Dakotasuchus kingi
            - MHNM-kh01
            - Terminonaris browni
            - Terminonaris robusta
  - Dyrosauroidea
    - Vectisuchus leptognathus
    - - Elosuchus cherifiensis
      - - Elosuchus broinae
        - Dyrosauridae
          - Chenanisuchus lateroculi
          - - Brachiosuchus kababishensis
            - - Anthracosuchus balrogus
              - - Cerrejonisuchus improcerus
                - - Phosphatosaurinae
                    - Phosphatosaurus gavialoides
                    - Sokotosuchus ianwilsoni
                  - - Rodeosuchus machukiru
                    - Hyposaurinae
                      - Dorbignysuchus niatu
                      - - - Hyposaurus derbianus
                          - Hyposaurus natator
                        - - - Arambourgisuchus khouribgaensis
                            - Luciasuchus lurusinqai
                            - - Dyrosaurus phosphaticus
                              - Dyrosaurus maghribensis
                          - - Acherontisuchus guajiraensis
                            - - Atlantosuchus coupatezi
                              - - Rhabdognathus aslerensis
                                - - Congosaurus bequaerti
                                  - Rhabdognathus keiniensis
