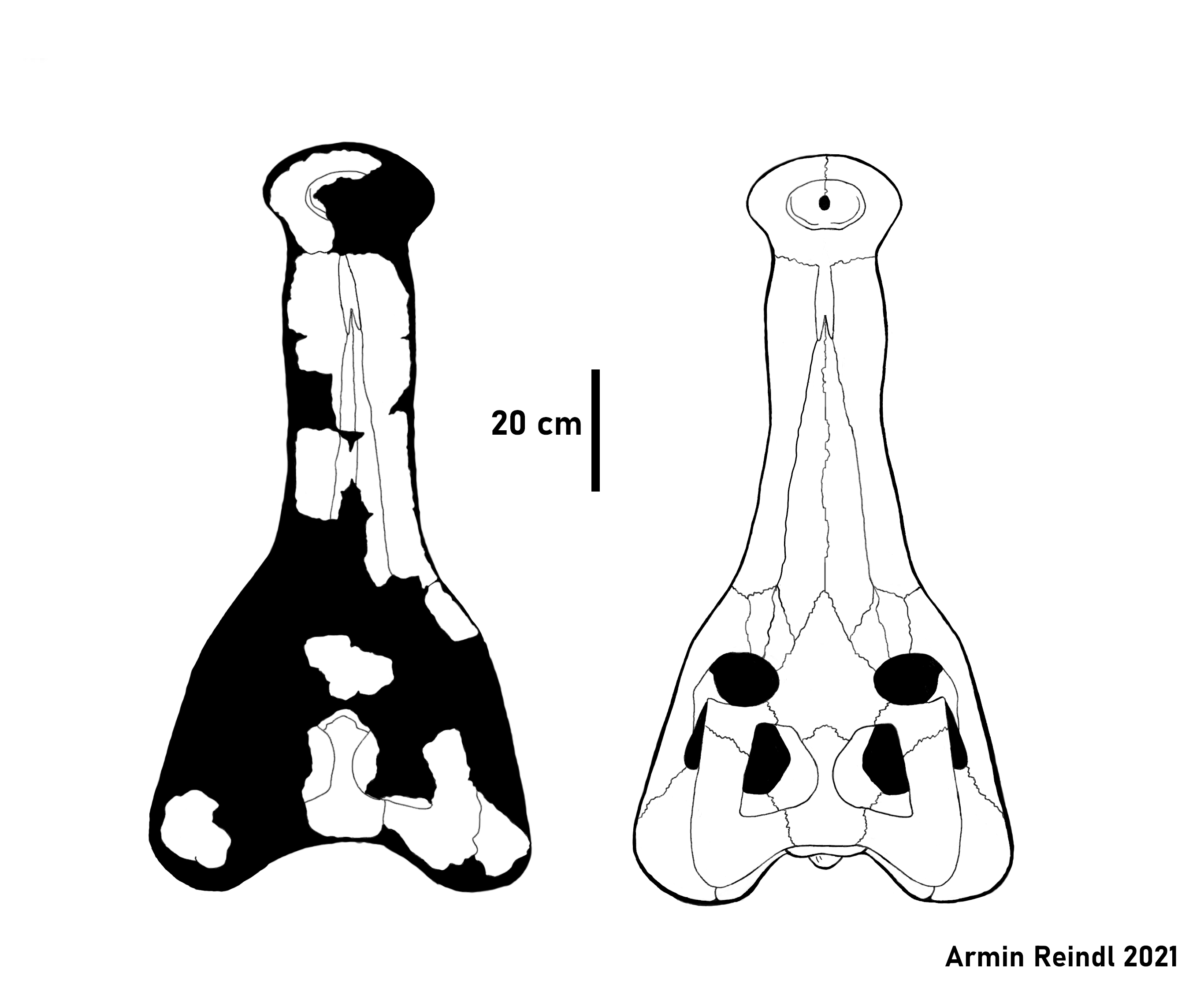
- Known remains of C. thailandicus specimen PRC102-143 (left), and reconstruction of the skull of C. thailandicus (right)

Scientific classification
- Kingdom: Animalia
- Phylum: Chordata
- Class: Reptilia
- Clade: Pseudosuchia
- Clade: Crocodylomorpha
- Family: †Pholidosauridae
- Genus: †Chalawan; Martin et al., 2013

Type species
- †Chalawan thailandicus (Buffetaut and Ingavat, 1980)

Other species
- Chalawan shartegensis? Efimov, 1988

Synonyms
- Sunosuchus thailandicus Buffetaut and Ingavat, 1980 ? Sunosuchus shartegensis Efimov, 1988

= Chalawan (reptile) =

Chalawan Temporal range: Berriasian

Extinct genus of reptiles

Chalawan (from Thai: ชาละวัน [t͡ɕʰāːlāwān]) is an extinct genus of pholidosaurid mesoeucrocodylian known from the Phu Kradung Formation of Nong Bua Lamphu Province, northeastern Thailand. It contains a single species, Chalawan thailandicus, with Chalawan shartegensis as a possible second species.

== Discovery and naming ==
The first fossil of Chalawan was a nearly complete lower jaw collected in the early 1980s from a road-cut near the town of Nong Bua Lamphu, in the upper part of the Phu Kradung Formation. This mandible was at first known from the posterior portion of the bone, described and named by Eric Buffetaut and Rucha Ingavat in 1980 as a new species of the goniopholidid Sunosuchus, Sunosuchus thailandicus. Shortly afterwards more material of the same specimen was found and described. In the early 2000s another locality of the Phu Kradung Formation was discovered near the village of Kham Phok, Mukdahan Province, yielding amongst other remains the anterior tip of a crocodylomorph mandible which was assigned to Sunosuchus thailandicus and described the pholidosaurid affinity of the specimen. This interpretation remained tentative until the discovery of previously unnoticed skull material associated with the Kham Phok mandible (specimen PRC102-143) which led to the reassignment of Chalawan to the Pholidosauridae.

Based on the new cranial material, Jeremy E. Martin, Komsorn Lauprasert, Eric Buffetaut, Romain Liard and Varavudh Suteethorn erected the new genus Chalawan and the combinatio nova Chalawan thailandicus. The generic name is derived from the name of Chalawan, a giant in the Thai folktale of Krai Thong that could take the form of a crocodile with diamond teeth.

== Description ==
The holotype mandible is very robust, and its tip is spoon shaped and wider than the portion of the jaw immediately behind it. The mandible of PRC102-143 is similar in size, though less complete, and preserves the same spatulate appearance. The 3rd and 4th dentary alveoli are raised and contiguous and hosted fang like teeth, after which the dentary constricts, much like seen in Sarcosuchus. However unlike Sarcosuchus, Chalawan does not possess a diastema between the enlarged 4th and small 5th dentary alveoli.

The referred cranial material suggests a possible skull length of 1.1 m (3 ft 7 in). The complete animal could reach over 10 m (33 ft) in body length, although other estimates suggest 7–8 m (23–26 ft). The specimen shows a combination of goniopholidid and pholidosaur features and has a robust tubular and slightly flattened rostrum widening abruptly around the jugals. The nasals are separated from the nares by the premaxilla, which tapers at its posterior end and extends far between the maxilla, and the supratemporal fenestrae are moderately sized, making up 25% of the skull table, differing from Terminonaris and Oceanosuchus whose fenestrae take up more of the skull table's surface. The premaxillary teeth are located on the anterior half of the premaxilla and when seen in lateral view the anterior margin extends further down than the rest of the bone, creating a characteristic "beak" shape also seen in Sarcosuchus and Terminonaris robusta. The transverse area of the premaxilla is separated from the rest of the bone by a diastema. This along with the hook-like shape, whereas traditional goniopholidids possess a notch in this area. Both the presence of a diastema and the hook-like anterior margin of the premaxilla are considered to be pholidosaurid characteristics.

The exact age of Chalawan is uncertain, as the Phu Kradung Formation may either date to the Late Jurassic or Early Cretaceous. While vertebrate fossil discoveries point at a Late Jurassic origin, palynology data instead suggests that the Formation represents Early Cretaceous sediments. A 2026 study have shown that while this formation is mostly Late Jurassic, the locality Chalawan found in (Kham Phok) is shown as early Berriasian, Cretaceous.

== Phylogeny ==
The phylogenetic tree below depicts Pholidosauridae as recovered by Jouve & Jalil (2020) obtained from a matrix including 224 characters. In this tree Chalawan was recovered as a sister taxon to the genus Sarcosuchus.

- Pholidosauridae
  - - - Meridiosaurus vallisparadisi
  - - - French Pholidosaur
      - - Pholidosaurus schaumbergensis
        - Pholidosaurus purbeckensis
    - - - Woodbinesuchus byersmauricei
        - Sabinosuchus coahuilensis
        - Oceanosuchus boecensis
      - - - Terminonaris spp.
        - - Chalawan thailandicus
          - - Sarcosuchus imperator
            - Sarcosuchus hartii

== "Sunosuchus" shartegensis ==
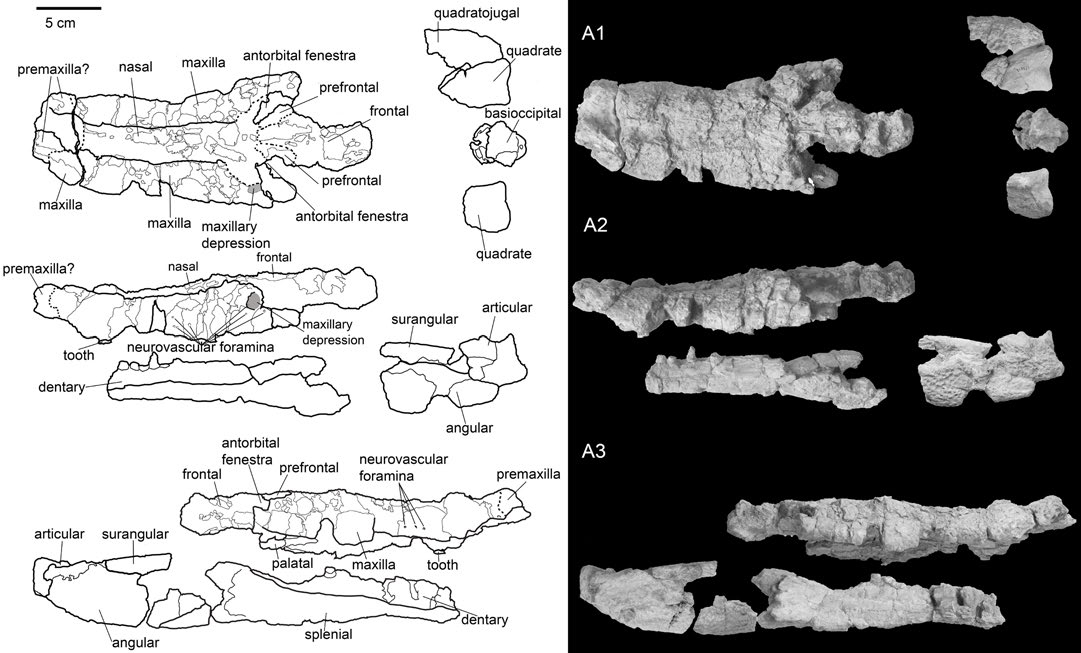
Holotype of Chalawan (Sunosuchus) shartegensis

Halliday et al. (2013) tentatively synonymized "Sunosuchus" shartegensis (Efimov, 1988) as "Sunosuchus" cf. thailandicus. "S." shartegensis is known solely from the holotype PIN 4174‒1, a fragmented skull, comprising the rostrum, the preorbital region of the skull roof, the quadrates and parts of the quadratojugal, the occipital condyle and nearly complete mandibles. It was collected from "Layer 2" of the Tithonian (Late Jurassic) Ulan Malgait beds, in the Shar Teeg locality, of the Govi-Altai Province of Outer Mongolia, embedded in grey clay. Halliday et al. (2013) stated that "S." shartegensis shares some features with other species of Sunosuchus, and can not be differentiated from the holotype of S. thailandicus. Nevertheless, it lacks definitive synapomorphies of S. thailandicus, and possibly even these of Goniopholididae, suggesting that it might belong to a different species. Using an updated version of Andrade et al. (2011) phylogenetic analysis, Halliday et al. (2013) found "S." shartegensis to be the sister taxon of Kansajsuchus from Tajikistan. The addition of S. thailandicus (based on the holotype) to the analysis did not confirm the referral of "S." shartegensis to "S." cf. thailandicus, as it resulted in a large polytomy. As the paper synonymizing the two crocodylomorphs appeared shortly before Martin et al.'s description of the cranial material, the taxonomic status of "S." shartegensis remains unknown.
