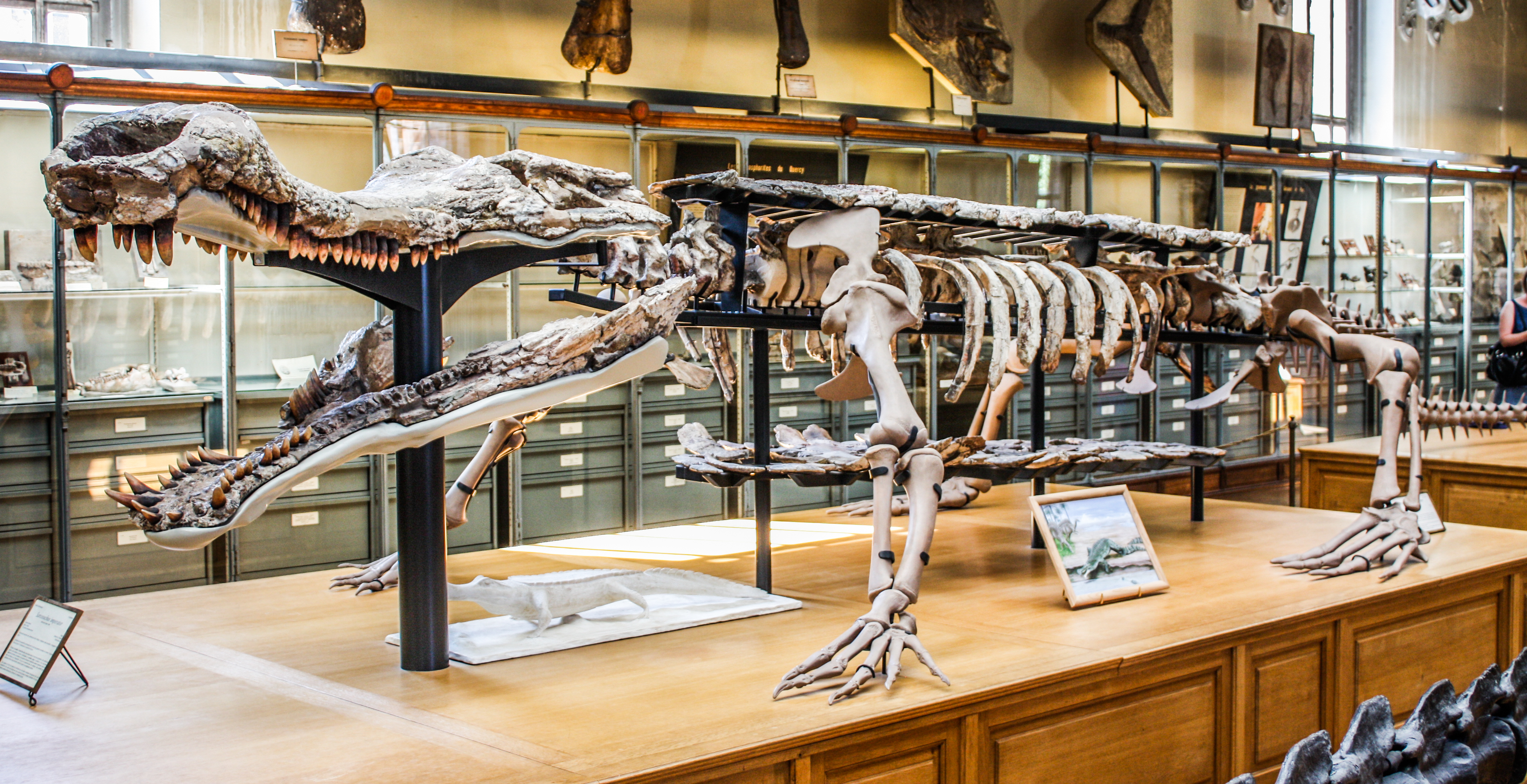
- S. imperator, Muséum national d'histoire naturelle, Paris

Scientific classification
- Kingdom: Animalia
- Phylum: Chordata
- Class: Reptilia
- Clade: Pseudosuchia
- Clade: Crocodylomorpha
- Family: †Pholidosauridae
- Genus: †Sarcosuchus; Broin and Taquet, 1966

Type species
- †Sarcosuchus imperator Broin and Taquet, 1966

Other Species
- †S. hartti Marsh, 1869

Synonyms
- Species synonymy: Crocodylus hartti Marsh, 1869; Goniopholis hartti (Marsh, 1869) Mawson and Woodward, 1907

= Sarcosuchus =

Sarcosuchus Temporal range: Late Hauterivian-Early Albian ~130–112 Ma Possible Cenomanian record

Extinct genus of pholidosaurid crocodylomorph

Sarcosuchus (/ˌsɑːrkoʊˈsuːkəs/), from Ancient Greek σάρξ (sárx), meaning "flesh", and Σοῦχος (Soûkhos), meaning "Sobek", is a genus of crocodyliform that lived during the Early Cretaceous (Hauterivian to Albian ages, 133 to 101 million years ago) in North Africa and Brazil. The genus was first described in 1966 by French paleontologists Frances de Broin and Philippe Taquet on the basis of an incomplete skull that was discovered in Gadoufaoua, northern Niger. They named the type species S. imperator. Prior to 1966, fragmentary fossils of S. imperator had been found in French expeditions to the Sahara as well. In 1977, the species Crocodylus hartti, which had been discovered in Early Cretaceous deposits in Brazil in the 1850s-60s, was reassigned to Sarcosuchus. S. hartti is known from largely fragmentary material compared to S. imperator and is smaller in size. The best-preserved remains of Sarcosuchus were not unearthed until 1997 and 2000, when American paleontologist Paul Sereno and University of Chicago crews collected six new specimens, including several skulls and postcranial remains, of S. imperator.

Sarcosuchus is a member of the extinct family Pholidosauridae, a clade of largely aquatic neosuchians distantly related to living crocodylians. S. imperator is one of the biggest crocodylomorphs known, with fully grown individuals estimated to have reached up to 9 to 9.5 m (29.5 to 31.2 ft) in total length and 3.45 to 4.3 metric tons (3.80 to 4.74 short tons) in weight. It had somewhat telescoped eyes and a long snout accounting for 75% of the length of the skull. The longest reported skull is 1.7 metres (5.6 ft) in length, while the longest confirmed skull is slightly shorter at 1.6 metres (5.2 ft) long. There were 35 teeth in each side of the upper jaw, while in the lower jaw there were 31 teeth in each side. The length of the upper jaw was also noticeably greater than that of the lower one, leaving a gap between them when the jaws were shut that created an overbite. In young individuals, the shape of the snout resembled that of the living gharial, but in fully grown individuals have much broader snouts.

Sarcosuchus may have had a Nile crocodile-like lifestyle in which it hunted large, terrestrial prey. This could have included dinosaurs such as the ornithopod Ouranosaurus and the sauropod Nigersaurus. However, biomechanical analyses of Sarcosuchus fossils indicate that it was not capable of a crocodile-like "death roll". In the Early Cretaceous, North Africa and Brazil were blanketed in mangrove forests and wetlands, fostering a hotspot of dinosaur, fish, crocodyliform, and pterosaur diversity. Isotopic analyses of S. imperator bones suggest that it had a diet composed of both fish and large dinosaurs.

== Discovery and naming ==
=== Early findings ===
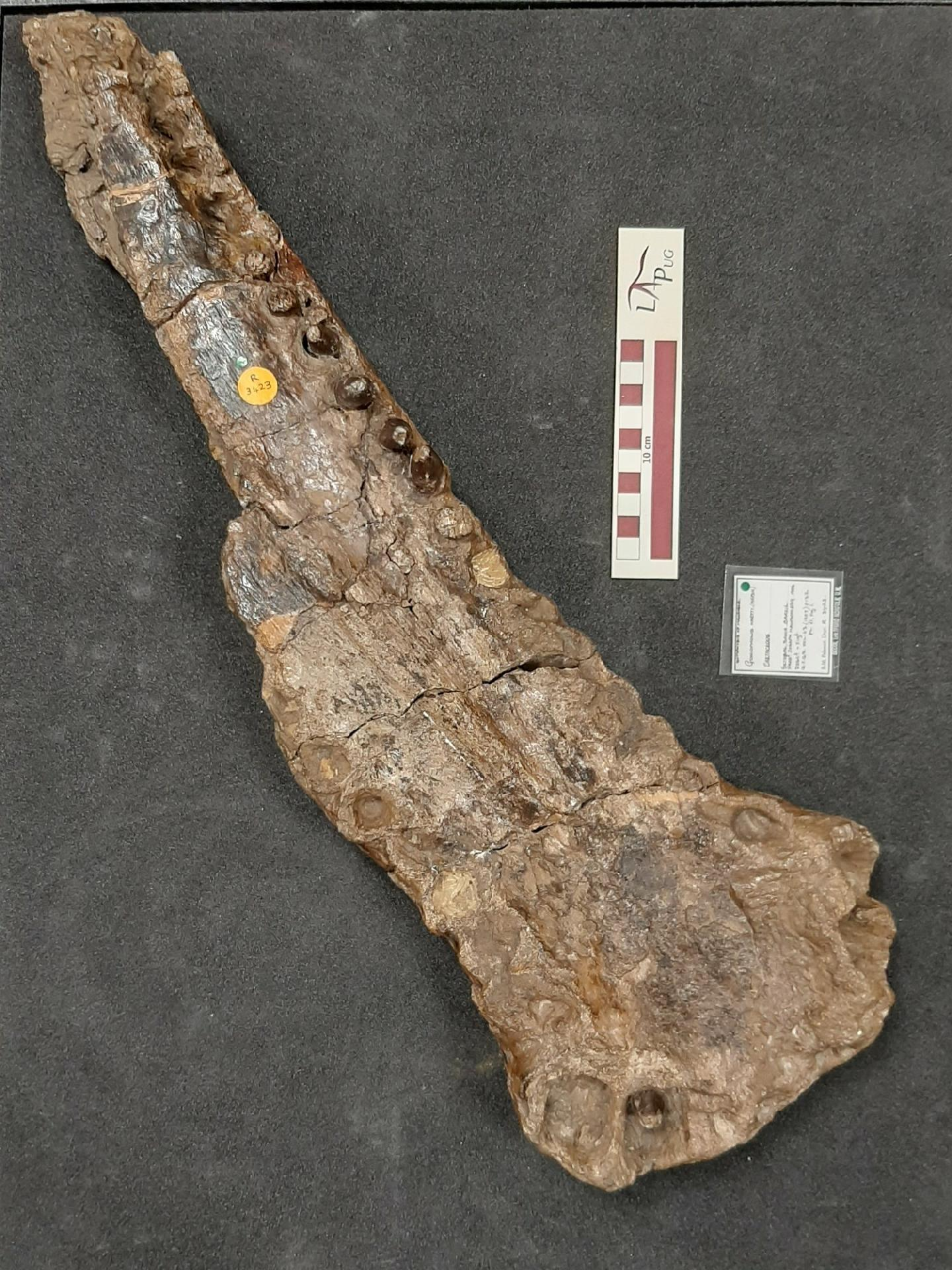
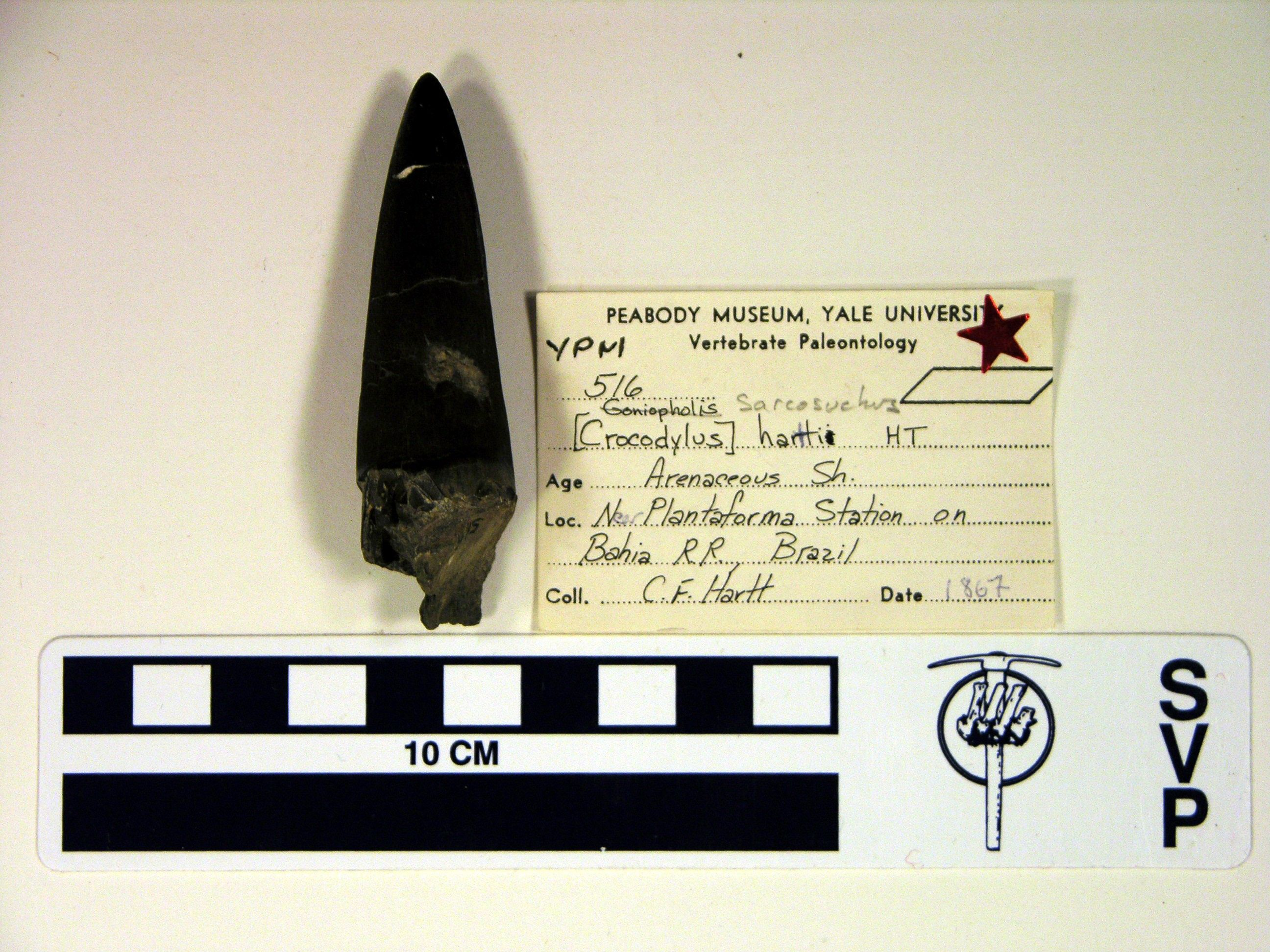
Mandible (NHMUK PV R 3423) and lectotype tooth of S. hartti

Fossils of Sarcosuchus were first discovered in the Fort Montserrate and Plataforma localities in the city of Salvador, Bahia State in northeastern Brazil in the 1850s by British petrologist Samuel Allport. Geologically, these locales are composed of highly-fossiliferous (fossil-bearing) conglomerates, sandstones, shales. This consisted of several isolated crocodilian teeth that were unearthed alongside fossils of fish, molluscs, and other crocodilians. Allport described them in 1860, where he assigned them to an indeterminate crocodilian. From 1864-65, an expedition enacted by Swiss-American naturalist Louis Agassiz and American professor Charles F. Hartt known as the Thayer Expedition collected additional fossils from the area. Two miles northwest of the locality at a site in proximity to the Bahia Railroad, the expedition collected additional remains, including a large, distinct, crocodilian tooth. All of the crocodilian teeth were then divided into two morphotypes: one with deep, continuous striae (morphotype 1) and one with a wrinkled surface (morphotype 2). These teeth were then sent to American paleontologist Othniel Charles Marsh who described them in 1869. Marsh placed the teeth into two new species: Thoracosaurus bahiensis, based on morphotype 1, and Crocodylus hartti, based on morphotype 2. However, the former is now classified as a nomen dubium. Marsh failed to select a holotype (name-bearing) specimen for C. hartti, though one of the teeth, now cataloged at the Yale Peabody Museum as YPM 516, was later selected as the lectotype while the rest of the teeth described by Allport (1860) are paralectotypes. In 1907, a host of other gigantic crocodilian remains were described by British paleontologists Joseph Mawson and Arthur Smith Woodward. These subsisted of specimens recovered over years of field work in Bahia, including an incomplete mandible (lower jaw) (BMNH R3423), a dorsal (top) osteoderm (dermal scute), and two teeth (BMNH R3079, 2983), that they referred to C. hartti. Mawson and Woodward (1907) went on to reclassify C. hartti as well into the British genus Goniopholis.

Fossils of the type species, S. imperator, were first unearthed between 1946 and 1959 during a series of French geological expeditions led by French paleontologist Albert-Félix de Lapparent to outcrops of the Cretaceous-aged "Continental Intercalaire" Formation outside of Aoulef, Algeria, Fogarra Ben Draou, Mali, and Jebel El Kambout, Tunisia in the then-French Sahara. Among the fossils recovered included teeth, osteoderms, ribs, skull fragments, and incomplete vertebrae (backbones). In 1957, during a separate volume of expeditions, French geologist Hugues Faure discovered Sarcosuchus teeth in northern Niger. Although believed to come from a deposit of the Elrhaz Formation, later research by American paleontologist Paul Sereno and colleagues has interpreted it as belonging to the Cenomanian-aged Farak Formation instead. In 1964, a research team from the French Atomic Energy Commission looking for uranium discovered a nearly complete skull of a large crocodylomorph at the Gadoufaoua locality, a series of strata from the Elrhaz Formation in the western Ténéré of Niger. Gadoufaoua is represented by a 175 kilometres (109 mi) long-stretch of pre-Cenomanian sandstones, likely deriving from the Barremian to Albian stages of the Lower Cretaceous period. This indicates it is between 125 and 112 million years old. The next year, this skull was transported to the National Museum of Natural History in Paris for study, though it now resides in the Musée National Boubou Hama in Niamey, Niger. In 1966, French paleontologists Frances de Broin and Philippe Taquet described all of the remains recovered on French expeditions as belonging to a new genus and species of pholidosaurid crocodylomorph, named Sarcosuchus imperator. They established the skull as the holotype specimen. The genus name, Sarcosuchus, comes from the Ancient Greek σάρξ (sárx), meaning "flesh", and Σοῦχος (Soûkhos), meaning "Sobek", in reference to the crocodile-headed god of Egyptian lore. The specific name, imperator, is from the Latin word imperare meaning "to command".

=== Later discoveries ===
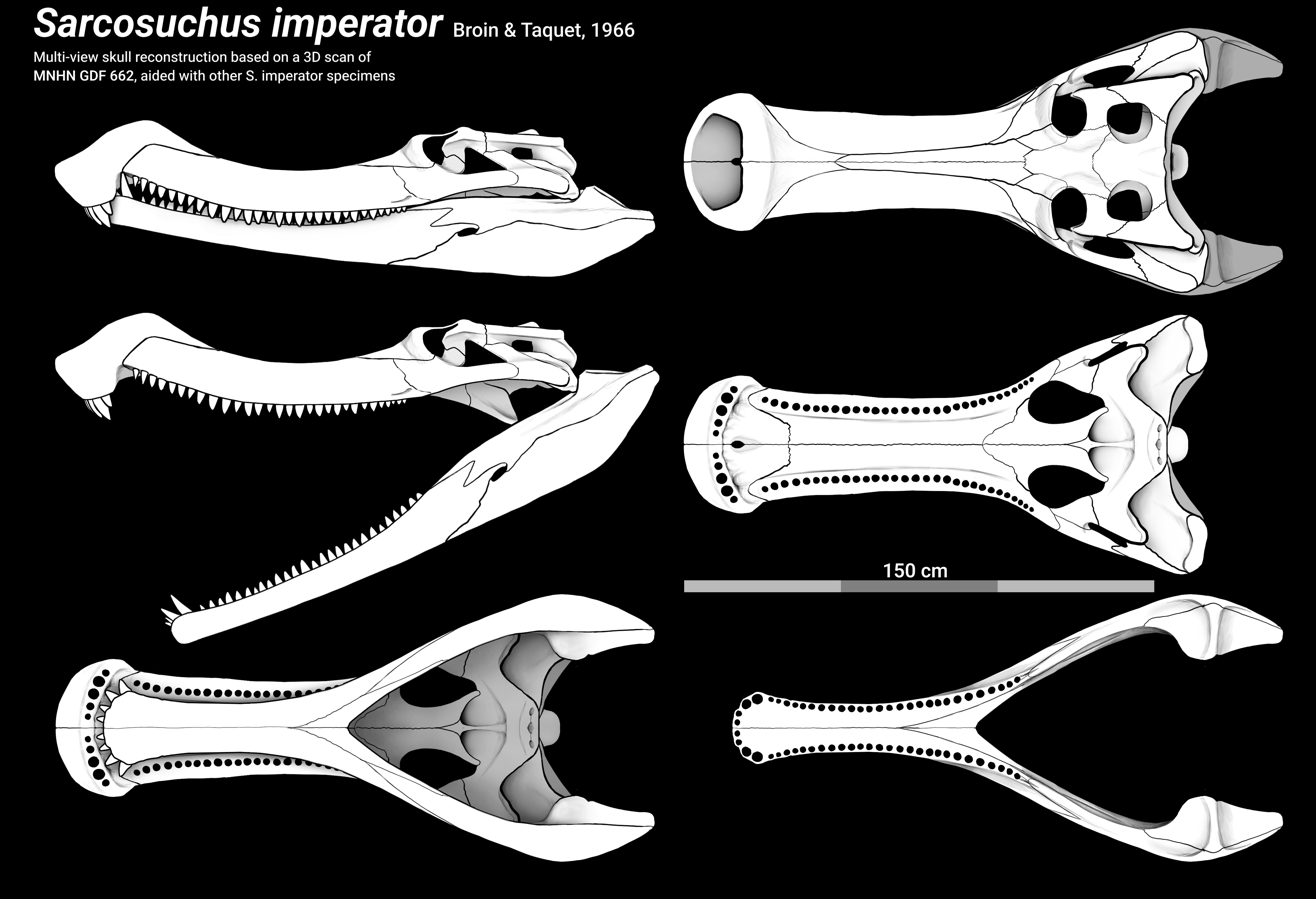
A skull reconstruction of S. imperator based on MNHN GDF 662

In 1977, French paleontologists Philippe Taquet and Eric Buffetaut reassigned Goniopholis hartti to Sarcosuchus based on commonalities between the teeth, jaws, and osteoderms of S. imperator and G. hartti. This has been supported by later studies, including a full redescription by Brazilian paleontologist Rafael Souza and colleagues in 2019. During the 1990s and 2000s, renewed interest in the Cretaceous strata of northern Africa led to a series of expeditions by the University of Chicago. This included to the Tiourarén Formation of Morocco in 1993, the Kem Kem Beds of Morocco in 1995, and the Elrhaz Formation in 1997 and 2000. On his 1997 expedition to outcrops of the Elrhaz Formation in the Ténéré Desert in northern Niger, American paleontologist Paul Sereno and his crew unearthed numerous remains of dinosaurs, turtles, and Sarcosuchus. The follow-up expedition in 2000 was more successful in unearthing Sarcosuchus remains. Partial skeletons, numerous skulls and 20 tons of assorted other fossils were recovered from the deposits of the Elrhaz Formation. It took about a year to prepare the Sarcosuchus remains.

A tooth enamel from the Ifezouane Formation (lower Kem Kem beds) of Morocco was identified as cf. Sarcosuchus. Fossil teeth from the area of Nalut in northwestern Libya, possibly Hauterivian to Barremian in age, might be referable to S. imperator. Indeterminate Sarcosuchus material including dorsal osteoderms in anatomical connection, isolated teeth and fragmentary skeletal remains including a left scapula, mandible fragment, dorsal vertebrae, ilium and a proximal portion of a femur was described from the Oum Ed Dhiab Member in Tunisia in 2018.

== Description ==
=== Size ===
Size of S. imperator (blue) compared with other crocodyliforms

A common method to estimate the size of crocodiles and crocodile-like reptiles is the use of the length of the skull measured in the midline from the tip of the snout to the back of the skull table, as in living crocodilians there is a strong correlation between skull length and total body length in subadult and adult individuals irrespective of their sex. This method was used by Sereno et al. (2001) for Sarcosuchus due to the absence of a complete enough skeleton. Two regression equations were used to estimate the size of S. imperator, they were created based on measurements gathered from 17 captive gharial individuals from northern India and from 28 wild saltwater crocodile individuals from northern Australia, both datasets supplemented by available measurements of individuals over 1.5 m (4.92 ft) in length found in the literature. The largest known skull of S. imperator (the type specimen) is 1.6 m (5.25 ft) long (1.5 m (4.92 ft) in the midline), and it was estimated that the individual it belonged to had a total body length of 11.65 m (38.2 ft). Its snout-vent length of 5.7 m (18.7 ft) was estimated using linear equations for the saltwater crocodile and in turn this measurement was used to estimate its body weight at 8 metric tons (8.8 short tons). This shows that Sarcosuchus was able to reach a maximum body size not only greater than previously estimated but also greater than that of the Miocene Rhamphosuchus, the Late Cretaceous Deinosuchus, and the Miocene Gryposuchus and Purussaurus according to most estimates at the time and a few years after.

However, extrapolation from the femur of a subadult individual as well as measurements of the skull width further showed that the largest S. imperator was significantly smaller than was estimated by Sereno et al. (2001) based on modern crocodilians. O'Brien et al. (2019) estimated the length of the largest S. imperator specimen at nearly 9 metres (29.5 ft) and body mass at 3.45 metric tons (3.80 short tons) based on longirostrine crocodylian skull width to total length and body width ratio. The highest upper quartile reconstructed length and body mass for the specimen is 9.5 metres (31.2 ft) and 4.3 metric tons (4.7 short tons), respectively.

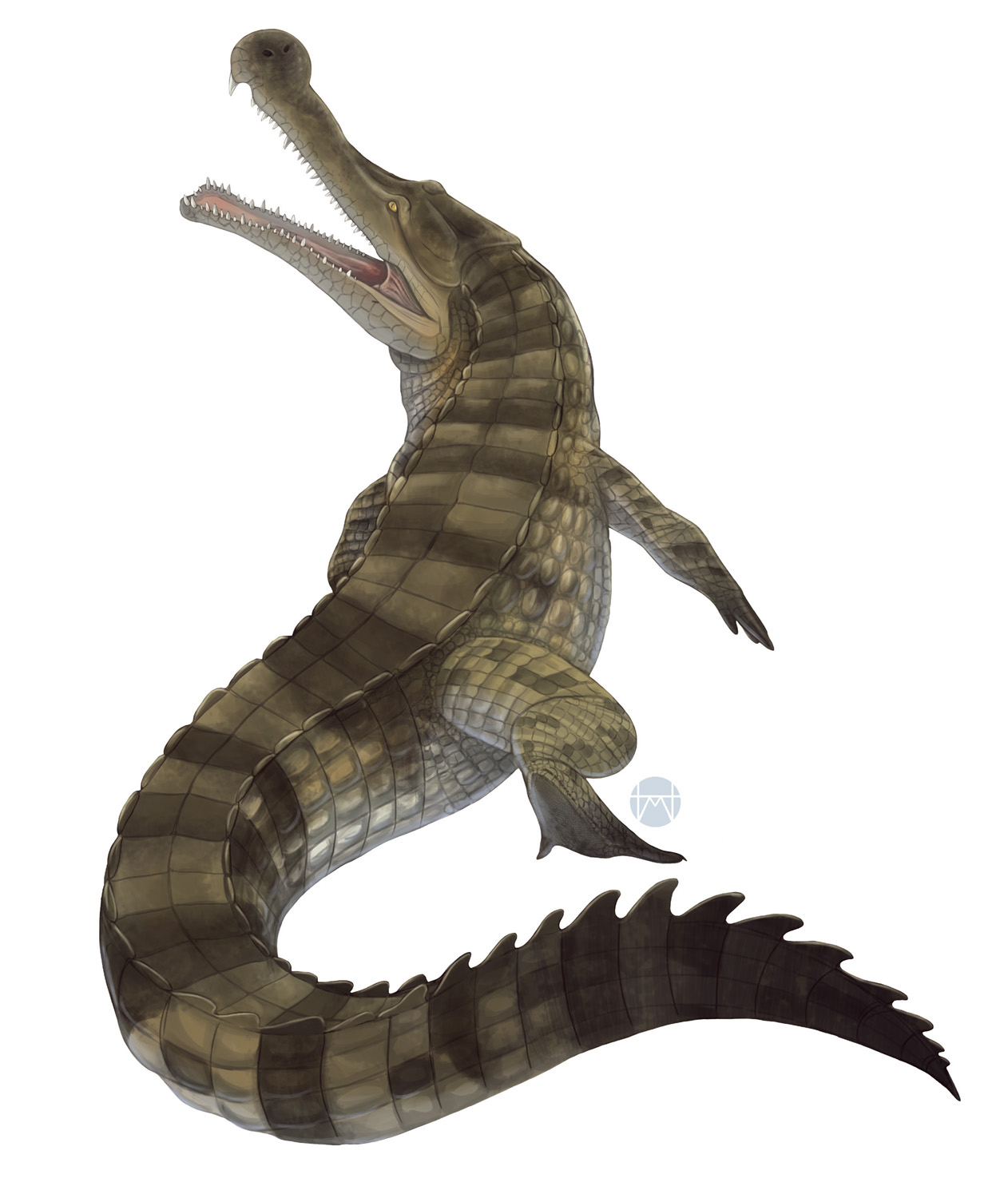
Life restoration of Sarcosuchus imperator

=== Skull ===
Sarcosuchus has a very long skull proportionally with a relatively elongated snout, which makes up about 75% of the total cranial length. Furthermore, it is broader than in gharials and other narrow-snouted crocodyliforms. The longest reported skull is 1.7 metres (5.6 ft) in length, however it remains undescribed, while the longest confirmed skull is slightly shorter at 1.6 metres (5.2 ft) long, with a 115 centimetres (3.77 ft) long and 270 millimetres (0.89 ft) wide snout. For reference, one of the largest skulls of the other giant crocodylomorph Deinosuchus was placed at 147.5 centimeters (4.84 ft) in length. In contrast, a lightly-built skull from a juvenile Sarcosuchus only measures 870 millimetres (2.85 ft) in length and bears a 645 millimetres (2.116 ft) long and a 99 millimetres (0.325 ft) wide snout. This indicates a snout length/cranial length ratio of 0.77 in adults while it is 0.74 in juveniles. The orbit, which is telescoped and angled dorsally (to the top), is only slightly smaller than the subtriangular supratemporal fossae (large openings in bone).

Sarcosuchus has an expansion at the end of its snout known as a bulla, which has been compared with the ghara seen in gharials. However, unlike the ghara, which is only observed in male gharials, the bulla is present in all Sarcosuchus skulls that have been described so far, suggesting that it was not a sexually dimorphic trait. This trait, as well as the ventral (down) offset of the snout tip, is also presented in the North American pholidosaurid Terminonaris. The nasals (naris-bearing bones) meet the premaxillae (front upper jaw bones) at the top of the palatine where they create the bulla. Unlike many organisms, the nares are combined into a single, external naris. On the upper jaws are five premaxillary teeth and 30 maxillary teeth, with the third and fourth premaxillaries the biggest teeth in the jaws. The 10th maxillary tooth is enlarged as well. Sarcosuchus' dentition also bears bulbous tooth crowns at the anterior ends of its maxillae and dentaries. Although found in relatives, this is a synapomorphy as it is part of a combination of traits unique to the genus. Unlike in S. imperator, S. hartti teeth bear false ziphodont (laterally compressed (flattened), sharp, and serrated) edges, a unique pattern of lines on its enamel surface, and smooth crenulations on its carinae. Furthermore, the jaws of S. hartti are heterodont, consisting of tall, enlarged anterior caniniforms and circular, blunt posterior teeth.

As for the dentary, it bears 31 teeth of which the third and fourth are larger than the others. This trait and the exhibition of a significant diastema between the 4th and 5th dentary teeth are unique to Sarcosuchus. Overall, their crowns are smooth and stout, though they also bare carinae (enamel ridges that form the cutting edges of teeth). The upper jaw has a significant overbite, which overhangs the anteriorly (towards front) enlarged tip of the dentary. Between the premaxillary tooth row and the front apex of the dentary lies a 10 centimetres (3.9 in) gap however none of the enlarged maxillary or premaxillary teeth insert into this area. Two other diagnostic traits of the presence of large, fan-shaped expansions at the distal end of the mandibulae and a symphysis that extends posteriorly to around dentary tooth 20, two traits characteristic of Sarcosuchus.

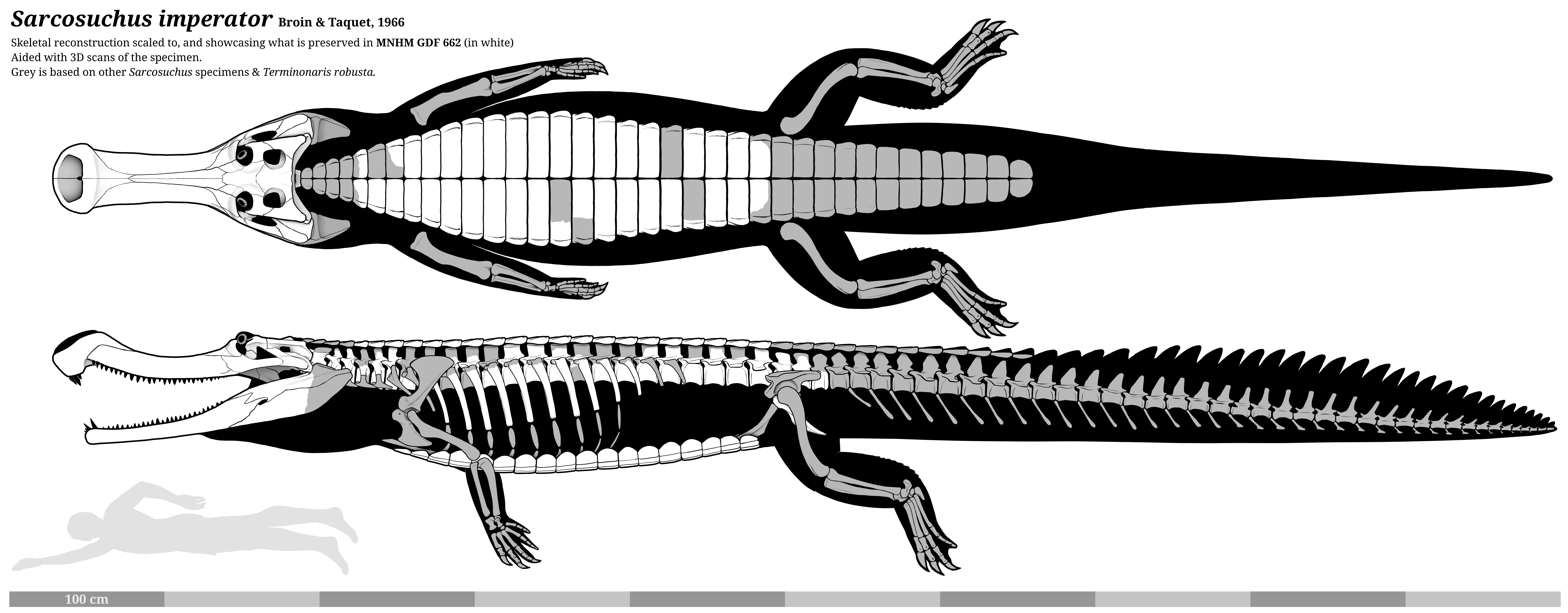
Skeletal reconstruction and size comparison of MNHN GDF 662

=== Postcrania ===
As for the postcrania, the vertebrae are amphicoelus (concave on anterior and posterior ends), a characteristic not found in crocodilians or clades like Atoposauridae. The cervical vertebrae bear shallow ventral keels (fin-like bony structures) and short overlapping ribs. In contrast, the dorsal vertebrae have enlarged transverse processes (extensions of bones sticking out the upper lateral faces of the vertebrae) and short, robust neural spines. Osteoderms are preserved in several Sarcosuchus specimens, with the cervical and dorsal osteroderms bearing low, laterally-positioned keels and hook-shaped anterolateral bony extensions. On the other hand, caudal osteroderms from the tail show quadrangular or subtriangular shapes and lack those keels or extensions. Similar to Araripesuchus, the osteoderms formed a continuous cover that ran from the anterior cervical vertebrae to the middle of the caudal vertebrae. This is in contrast to extant crocodylians, which bear exhibit gaps between the osteoderms of their neck and trunk. The appendicular skeleton is fairly well known, with the scapulae, coracoids, and pubes being preserved as extremely flared. The iliac blade shows a broad dorsal (top) side.

== Classification ==
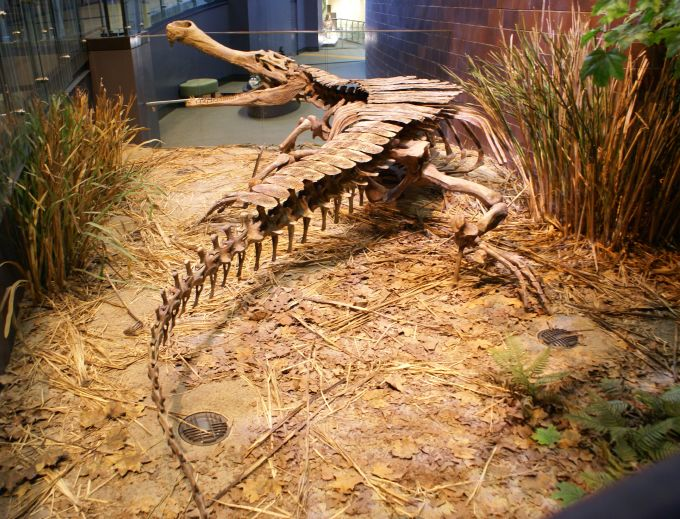
Reconstructed S. imperator skeleton from behind at the Indianapolis Children's Museum

Sarcosuchus is commonly classified as part of the clade Pholidosauridae, a group of crocodile-like reptiles (Crocodyliformes) related but outside Crocodylia (the clade containing living crocodiles, alligators and gharials). Within this group it is most closely related to the North American genus Terminonaris. Most members of Pholidosauridae had long, slender snouts and they all were aquatic, inhabiting several different environments. Some forms are interpreted as marine, capable of tolerating saltwater while others, like Sarcosuchus, were freshwater forms. The most primitive members of the clade, however, were found in coastal settings, zones mixing freshwater and marine waters. Sarcosuchus stands out among pholidosaurids for being considered a generalist predator, different from most known members of the clade which were specialized piscivores. A 2019 study found it to be in a more derived position in Tethysuchia, being phylogenetically closer to Dyrosauridae.

Simplified cladogram after Fortier et al. (2011).

The cladogram below is from study in 2024 by Forêt and colleagues on the interrelationships of tethysuchians.

- Tethysuchia
  - Pholidosauridae
    - Meridiosaurus vallisparadisi
    - - - Pholidosaurus cherves
        - - Pholidosaurus purbeckensis
          - Pholidosaurus schaumbergensis
      - - - Woodbinesuchus byersmauricei
          - Oceanosuchus boecensis
          - Sabinosuchus coahuilensis
        - - - Sarcosuchus imperator
            - Chalawan thailandicus
          - - Dakotasuchus kingi
            - MHNM-kh01
            - Terminonaris browni
            - Terminonaris robusta
  - Dyrosauroidea

== Paleobiology ==
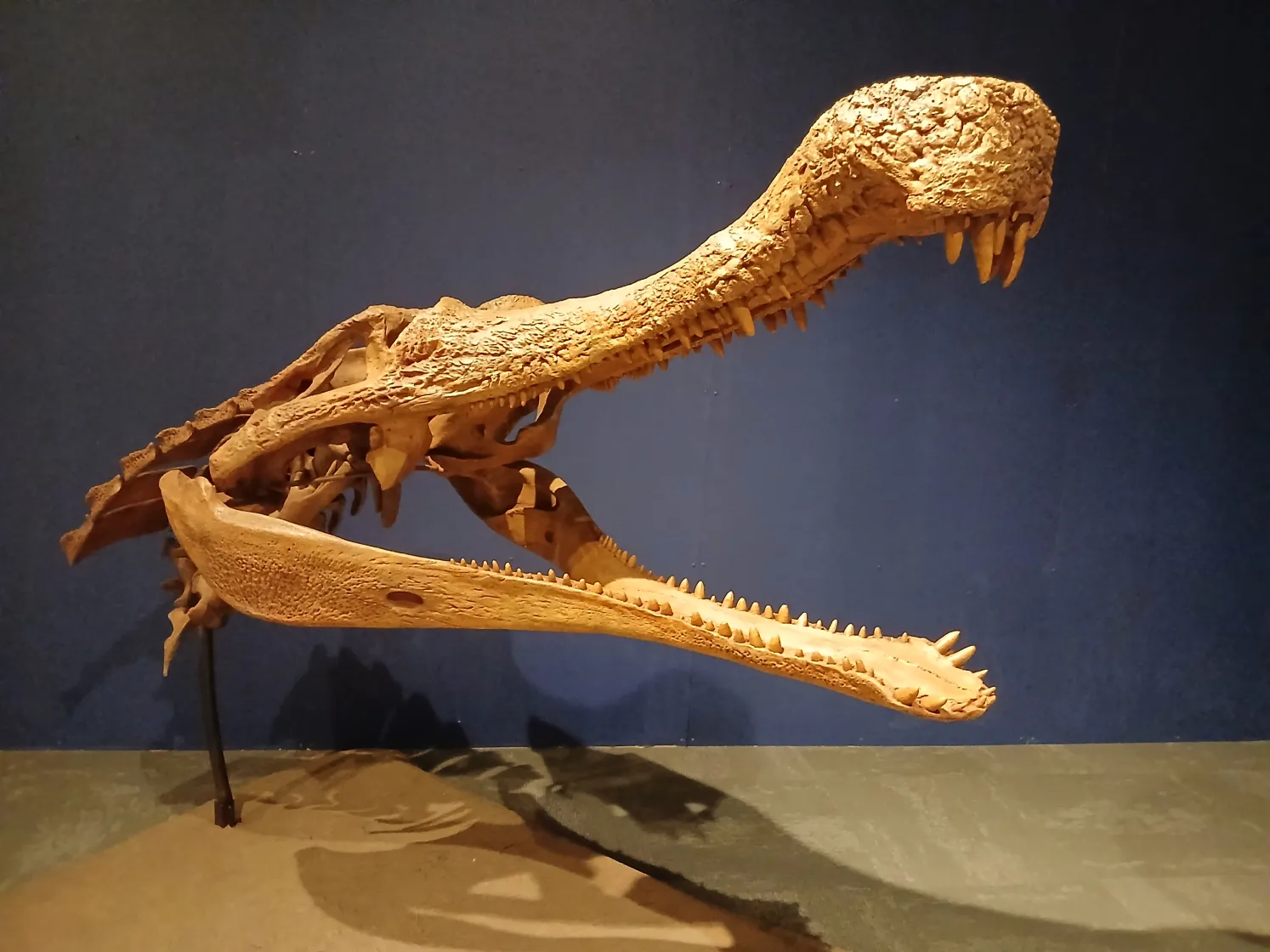
Reconstructed S. imperator skull and neck

=== Growth pattern ===
Sereno took thin sections from trunk osteoderms of an estimated subadult individual (~80% of estimated maximum adult size). Approximately 40 lines of arrested growth (LAG) were counted in these thin sections, suggesting that S. imperator took 50 to 60 years to reach adult size. Given that extant wild crocodylians rarely reach these advanced ages, Sereno suggested that S. imperator achieved its large size by extending its period of rapid, juvenile, growth. A similar growth strategy has been suggested for the equally titanic crocodylomorph Deinosuchus, based on similar criteria.

=== Diet ===
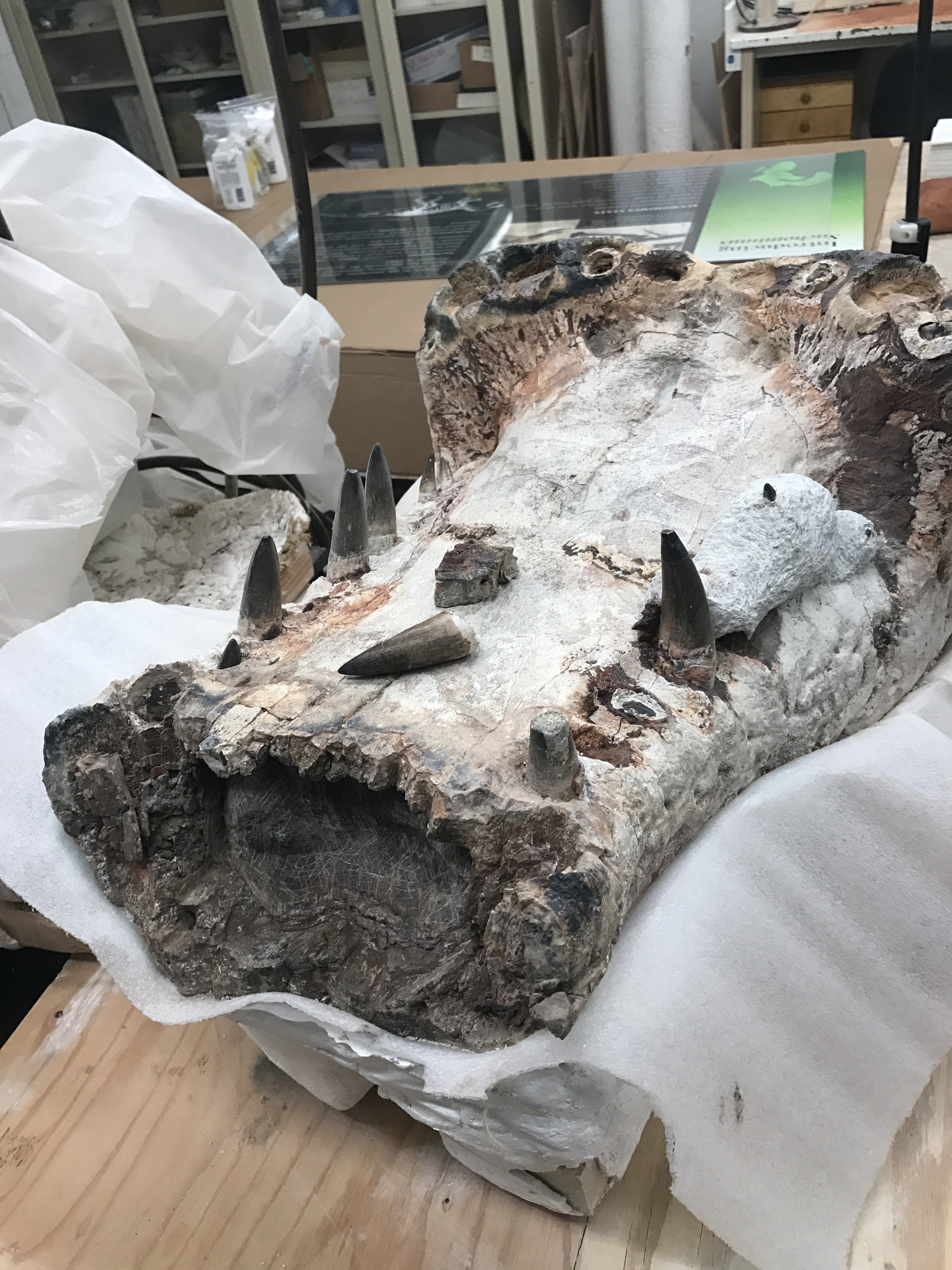
An incomplete S. imperator skull at the University of Chicago

Based on the broader snout of fully grown S. imperator when compared with the living gharial and other narrow-snouted crocodiles, along with a lack of interlocking of the smooth and sturdy-crowned teeth when the jaws were closed, Sereno et al. hypothesized that S. imperator had a generalized diet similar to that of the Nile crocodile, which would have included large terrestrial prey such as the abundant dinosaurs that lived in the same region.

However, a 2014 analysis of a biomechanical model of its skull suggested that unlike Deinosuchus, Sarcosuchus may not have been able to perform the

"death roll" maneuver used by extant crocodilians to dismember their prey. This suggests that if S. imperator did hunt big game, it probably did not dismember prey in the same fashion as extant crocodilians.

== Habitat ==
=== North Africa ===
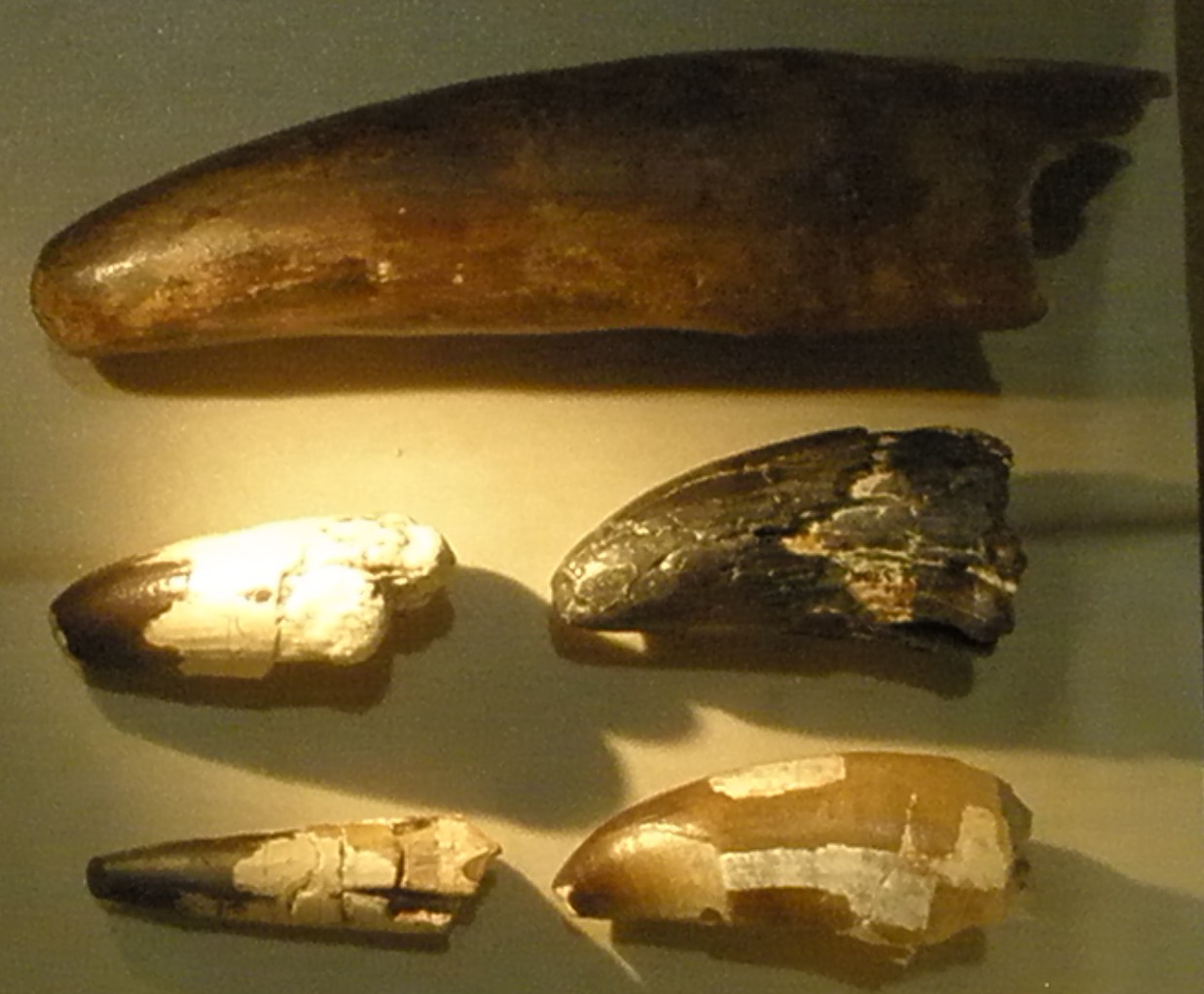
Teeth of S. imperator

Sarcosuchus is known from the Elrhaz Formation of the Tegama Group in an area of the Nigerian Ténéré Desert called Gadoufaoua. The Elrhaz Formation consists mainly of fluvial sandstones with low relief, much of which is obscured by sand dunes. The sediments are coarse- to medium-grained, with almost no fine-grained horizons. Sarcosuchus lived about 120 to 112 million years ago, during the Aptian to Albian ages of the mid-Cretaceous. It likely lived in habitats dominated by inland floodplains (a riparian zone).

Sarcosuchus lived alongside a diverse array of dinosaurs. These included theropods, such as the spinosaurid Suchomimus, Kryptops (known from a chimaeric combination of abelisaurid and allosauroid material), Eocarcharia (known from a chimeric group of spinosaurid and allosauroid material), and the putative noasaurid Afromimus. Several megaherbivores, including the hadrosauriforms Ouranosaurus and Lurdusaurus, the dryosaurid Elrhazosaurus, and two sauropods, the rebbachisaurid Nigersaurus and an unnamed titanosaur, have been unearthed from Gadoufaoua. Together, these form one of the few associations of megaherbivores with a balance of sauropods and large ornithopods. Crocodylomorphs including Anatosuchus, Araripesuchus, and Stolokrosuchus were also found in these rock layers. In addition, remains of an unnamed ornithocheirid pterosaur, turtles, bony fish, a hybodont (shark-like fish), and bivalves have been found. The aquatic fauna consists entirely of freshwater inhabitants.

=== Brazil ===
Meanwhile, S. hartti was found in the Recôncavo Basin of Brazil, specifically in the Ilhas Formation of the Bahia series. It was a shallow lacustrine environment dating from the late Aptian, similar in age to the habitat of S. imperator, with similar aquatic fauna, including Lepidotus and two species of Mawsonia. The dinosaur fauna is of a very fragmentary nature and identification does not go beyond indeterminate theropod and iguanodontid remains.
