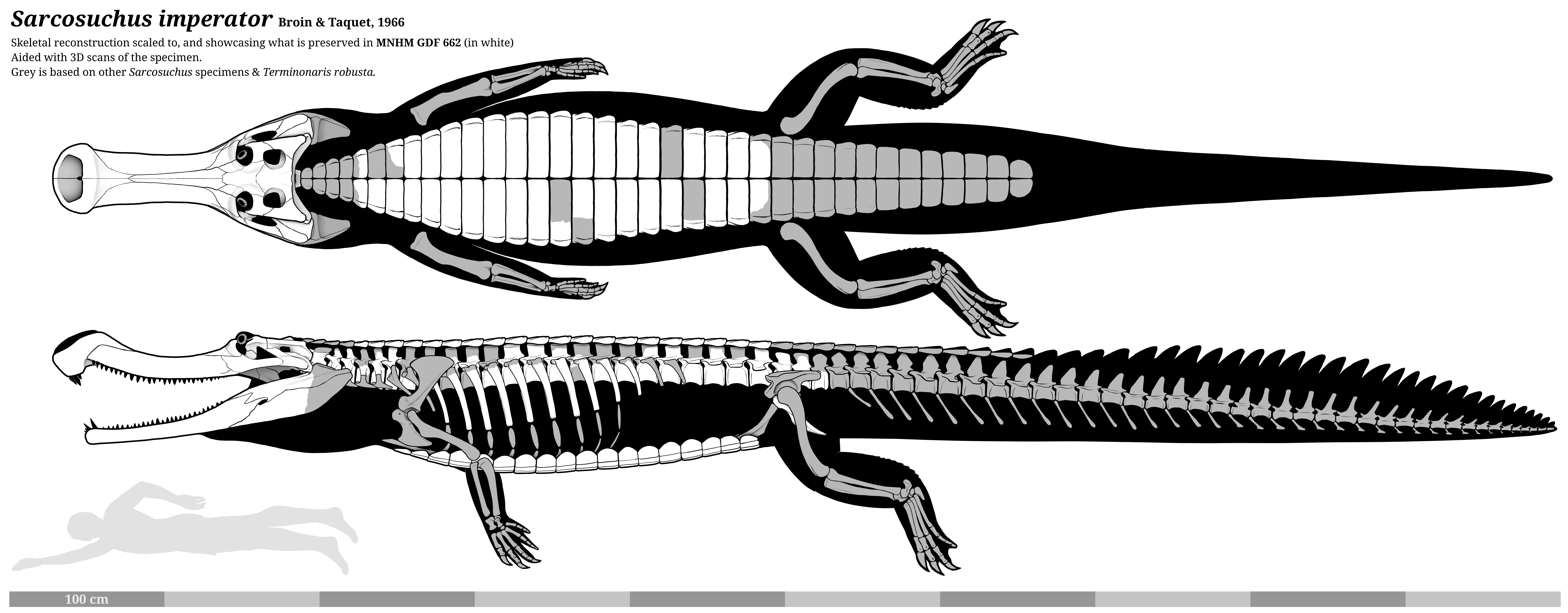
- Skeletal reconstruction of Sarcosuchus imperator, the largest known pholidosaurid, and one of the largest crocodyliforms to have ever existed
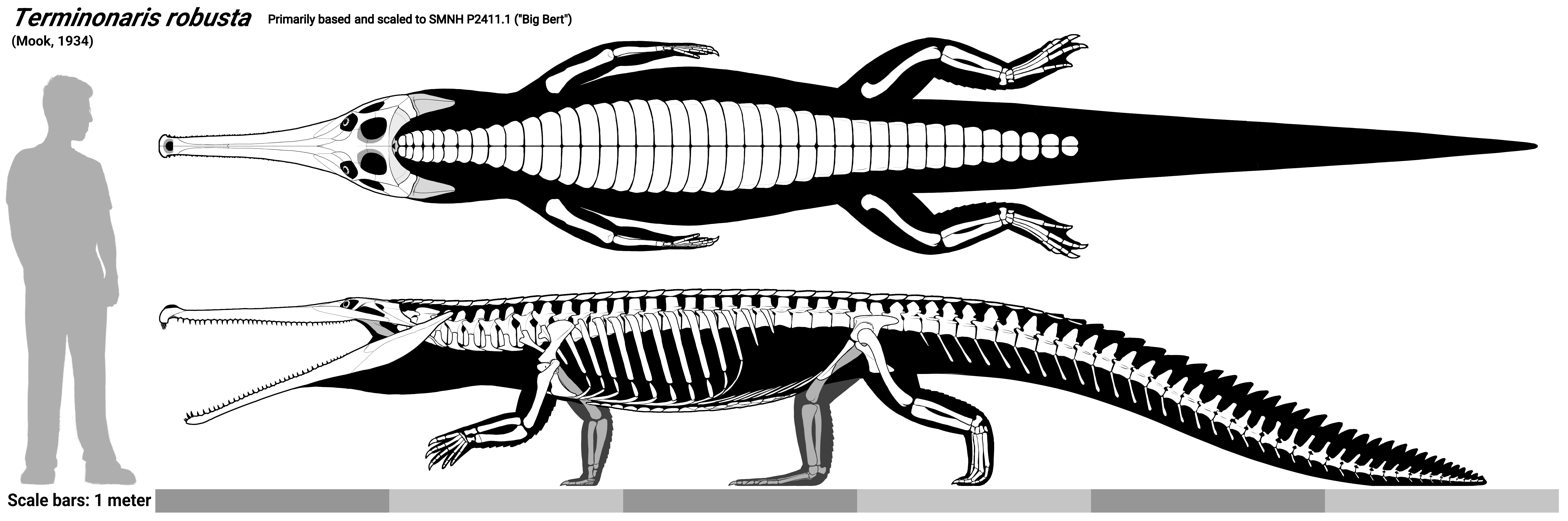
- Skeletal reconstruction of Terminonaris robusta

Scientific classification
- Kingdom: Animalia
- Phylum: Chordata
- Class: Reptilia
- Clade: Archosauria
- Clade: Pseudosuchia
- Clade: Crocodylomorpha
- Suborder: †Tethysuchia
- Family: †Pholidosauridae; Zittel and Eastman, 1902

Subgroups
- †Chalawan; †Crocodilaemus; †Dakotasuchus?; †Elosuchus?; †Meridiosaurus; †Oceanosuchus; †Pholidosaurus; †Sabinosuchus?; †Sarcosuchus; †Terminonaris; †Vectisuchus; †Woodbinesuchus?

= Pholidosauridae =

Pholidosauridae Temporal range: Late Jurassic - Late Cretaceous, 150–66 Ma Possible Middle Jurassic (Bathonian) and Paleocene (Danian) records.

Extinct family of reptiles

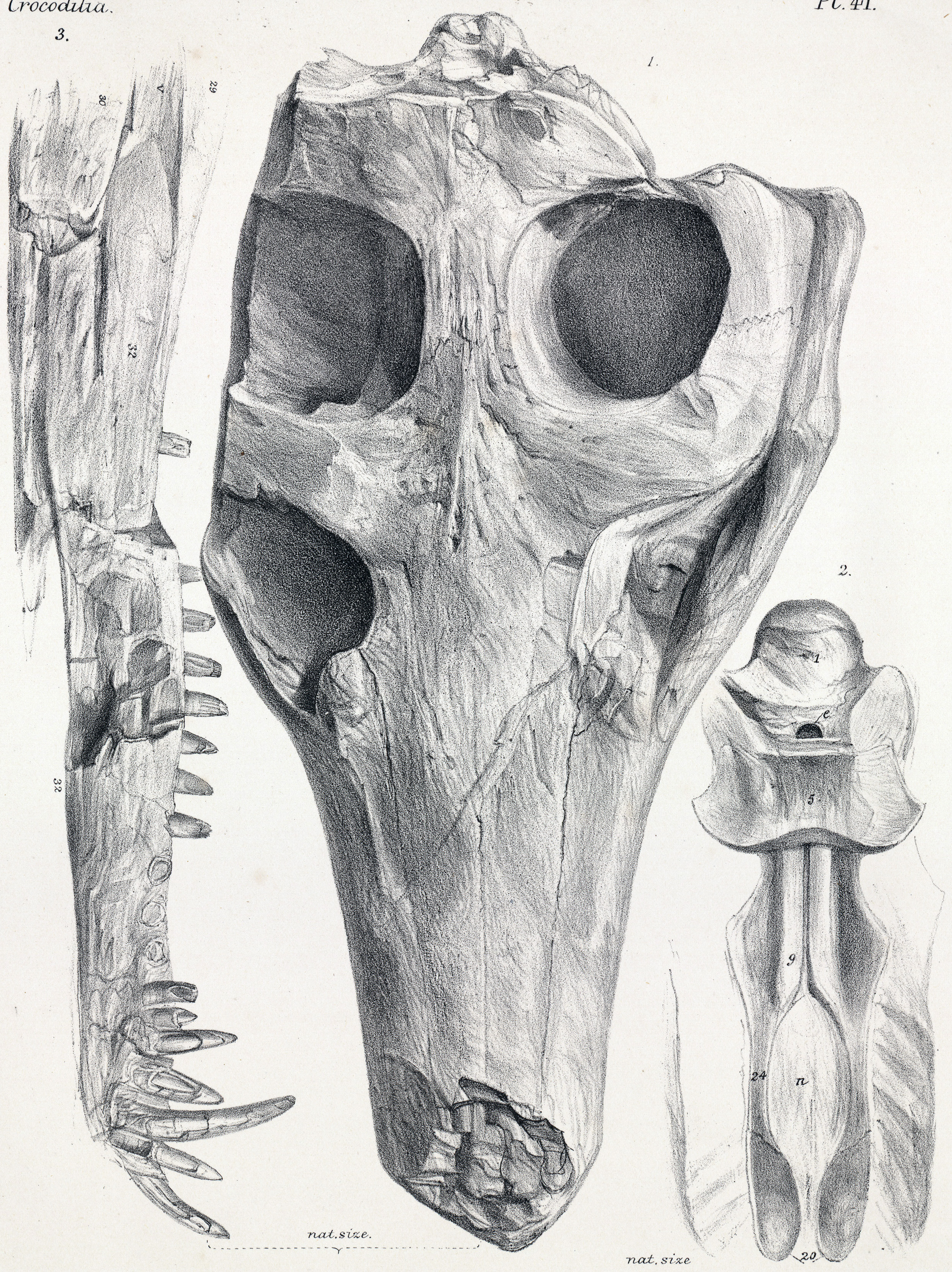
Pholidosaurus purbeckensis fossil.

Pholidosauridae is an extinct family of aquatic neosuchian mesoeucrocodylian crocodylomorphs. Fossils have been found in Europe (Denmark, England, France, Germany, Spain and Sweden), Africa (Algeria, Niger, Mali, Morocco and Tunisia), North America (Canada and the United States) and South America (Brazil and Uruguay). The pholidosaurids first appeared in the fossil record during the Bathonian stage of the Middle Jurassic. Jouve & Jalil (2020) described postcranial material of a pholidosaurid from the Paleocene (Danian) of Ouled Abdoun Basin (Morocco), representing the most recent record of the family. The authors also reinterpreted putative Maastrichtian dyrosaurid Sabinosuchus as a pholidosaurid, and argued that at least two independent pholidosaurid lineages reached the Maastrichtian, among which one survived the Cretaceous–Paleogene extinction event. Before the publication of this study it was thought that the family became extinct during the Late Turonian stage of the Late Cretaceous.

Sarcosuchus is one of the best known pholidosaurs. It is believed to have attained lengths of up to 9.5 m and weighed up to 4.3 metric tons. Related to Sarcosuchus, Chalawan thailandicus could have reached more than 10 m (33 ft) in length. One genus, Suchosaurus, once thought to be a pholidosaur, has since been shown to be a spinosaurid theropod dinosaur (incertae sedis within Baryonychinae; possibly a junior synonym of Baryonyx). The Cenomanian Terminonaris was the Pholidosaurid species that appeared to be the most common during the Late Cretaceous.

== Phylogeny ==
Pholidosauridae is usually considered to be most closely related to the Dyrosauridae. However, the relationship between these families is not fully understood. Pholidosauridae might be monophyletic, paraphyletic or even a polyphyletic in relation to Dyrosauridae. For example, Fortier, Perea & Schultz (2011) found the family to be monophyletic, and include to main lineages: the Elosuchus–Meridiosaurus lineage and the Pholidosaurus lineage. The cladogram below shows their phylogenetic analysis, which is based on an expanded version of Pol and Gasparini (2009) analysis.

- Neosuchia
  - Atoposauridae
    - Alligatorium
    - Theriosuchus pusillus
  - - - Goniopholididae
      - - Bernissartia fagesii
        - Eusuchia
    - - Thalattosuchia
      - - Pholidosauridae
          - - Pholidosaurus purbeckensis
            - - Sarcosuchus imperator
              - Terminonaris robusta
          - - Oceanosuchus boecensis
            - - Elosuchus cherifiensis
              - Meridiosaurus vallisparadisi
        - Dyrosauridae
          - Sokotosuchus ianwilsoni
          - - Dyrosaurus phosphaticus
            - Hyposaurus rogersii
            - Rhabdognathus

de Andrade et al. (2011) recovered a paraphyletic traditional Pholidosauridae. In their analysis the "Elosuchus lineage" was found to be basal to the "Pholidosaurus lineage"+Dyrosauridae. They used the name Elosuchidae for the Elosuchus lineage and restricted Pholidosauridae to its type genus. The following cladogram simplified after their analysis.

- Neosuchia
  - Atoposauridae
    - Theriosuchus pusillus
    - Theriosuchus guimarotae
  - - - Rugosuchus
      - - Bernissartia
        - Eusuchia
    - - Stolokrosuchus
      - - Goniopholididae
        - - Thalattosuchia
          - Tethysuchia
            - Elosuchidae
              - - Sarcosuchus hartti
                - Sarcosuchus imperator
              - - Vectisuchus
                - Elosuchus
            - - Pholidosauridae
                Pholidosaurus schaumburgensis
              - Dyrosauridae
                - Congosaurus
                - Guarinisuchus
                - - Dyrosaurus maghribensis
                  - Dyrosaurus phosphaticus
