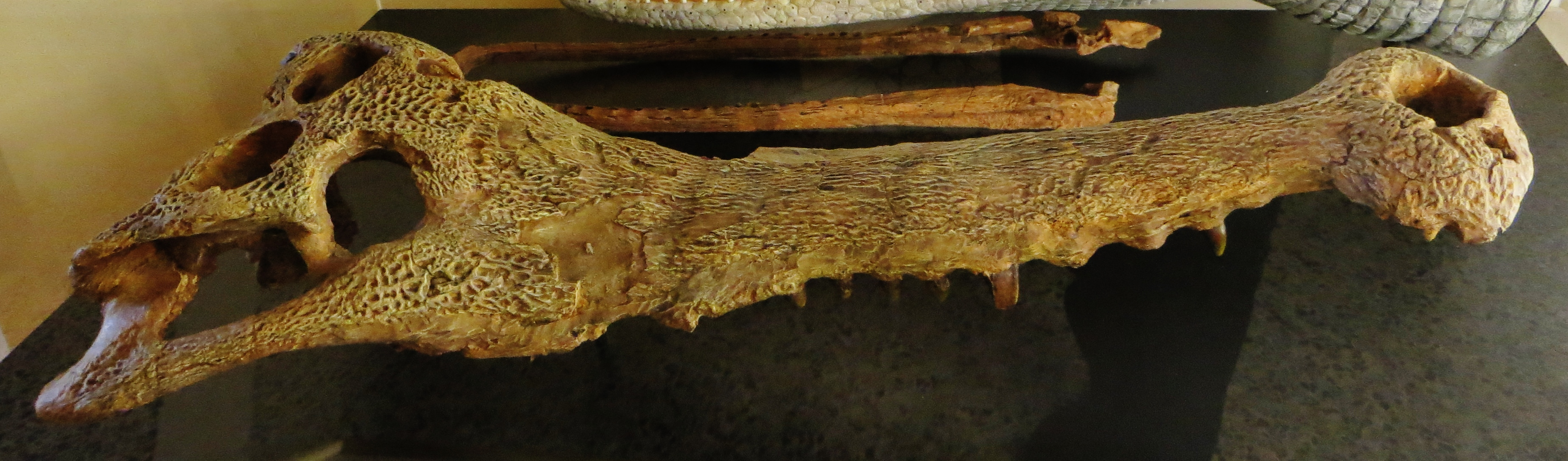
- Skull of E. cherifiensis

Scientific classification
- Kingdom: Animalia
- Phylum: Chordata
- Class: Reptilia
- Clade: Archosauria
- Clade: Pseudosuchia
- Clade: Crocodylomorpha
- Family: †Pholidosauridae
- Genus: †Elosuchus de Broin, 2002

Species
- †E. cherifiensis (Lavocat, 1955) de Broin, 2002; †E. broinae Meunier & Larsson, 2016

= Elosuchus =

Elosuchus Temporal range: Cenomanian

Extinct genus of reptiles

Elosuchus is an extinct genus of neosuchian crocodyliform that lived during the Middle Cretaceous of what is now Africa (Niger, Morocco, and Algeria).

== Description and taxonomy ==
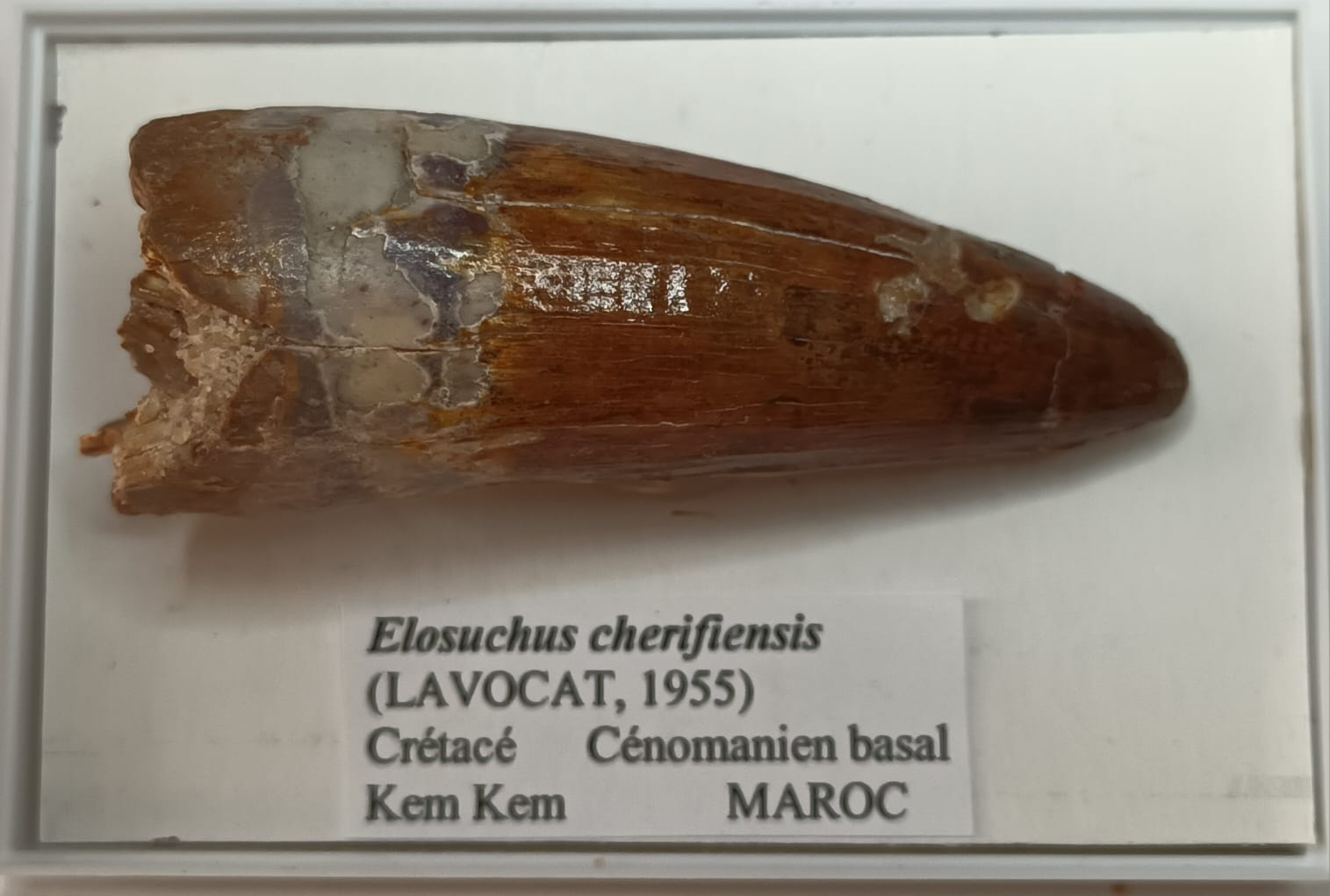
Tooth of E. cherifiensis from the Max Rouger collection

Elosuchus had an elongated snout like a gharial and was probably a fully aquatic animal. The type species, E. cherifiensis from Algeria and Morocco, was originally described as a species of Thoracosaurus by Lavocat, but was recognized as a genus separate from Thoracosaurus by de Broin in 2002. Elosuchus felixi, described from the Echkar Formation of Niger, was renamed Fortignathus in 2016 and is either a dyrosaurid relative or a non-hyposaurine dyrosaurid. The large skull measuring approximately 1.08 m (3.5 ft) long indicates a body length of up to 7.7 metres (25 ft). In 2022, the largest known premaxilla specimen was referred to the genus, suggesting a maximum skull length of 1.35 m (4.4 ft).

== Phylogeny ==
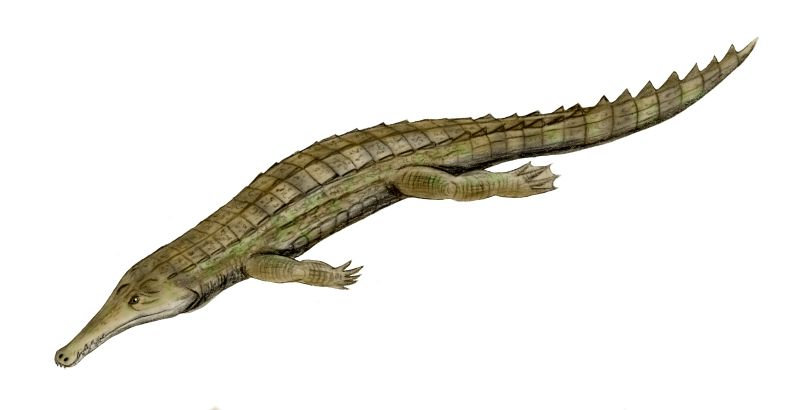
Speculative life restoration of E. cherifiensis

de Broin (2002) created the family Elosuchidae to contain Elosuchus and the genus Stolokrosuchus from Niger. However, recent phylogenetic analyses usually find Stolokrosuchus to be one of the basalmost neosuchian, only distantly related to Elosuchus. Some analyses find a monophyletic Pholidosauridae that includes Elosuchus, while other analyses find Elosuchus to nest with taxa like Sarcosuchus in a clade as a sister-taxon to the node Dyrosauridae+Pholidosauridae.
