= Vectisuchus =

Vectisuchus Temporal range: Early Cretaceous

Scientific classification
- Kingdom: Animalia
- Phylum: Chordata
- Class: Reptilia
- Clade: Archosauria
- Clade: Pseudosuchia
- Clade: Crocodylomorpha
- Family: †Pholidosauridae
- Genus: †Vectisuchus; Buffetaut & Hutt, 1980

Species
- †V. leptognathus Buffetaut and Hutt, 1980 (type)

Extinct genus of reptiles

Vectisuchus is a genus of pholidosaurid mesoeucrocodylian, known from the Early Cretaceous-age Wealden Group of the Isle of Wight, England. It was a small, piscivorous crocodylomorph with a narrow, elongate snout, and relatively long forearms. The type specimen, SMNS 50984, was found in 1977. When discovered, it was complete and right-side-up, but the posterior portion was lost during excavation. Vectisuchus was described in 1980. The type species is V. leptognathus.
