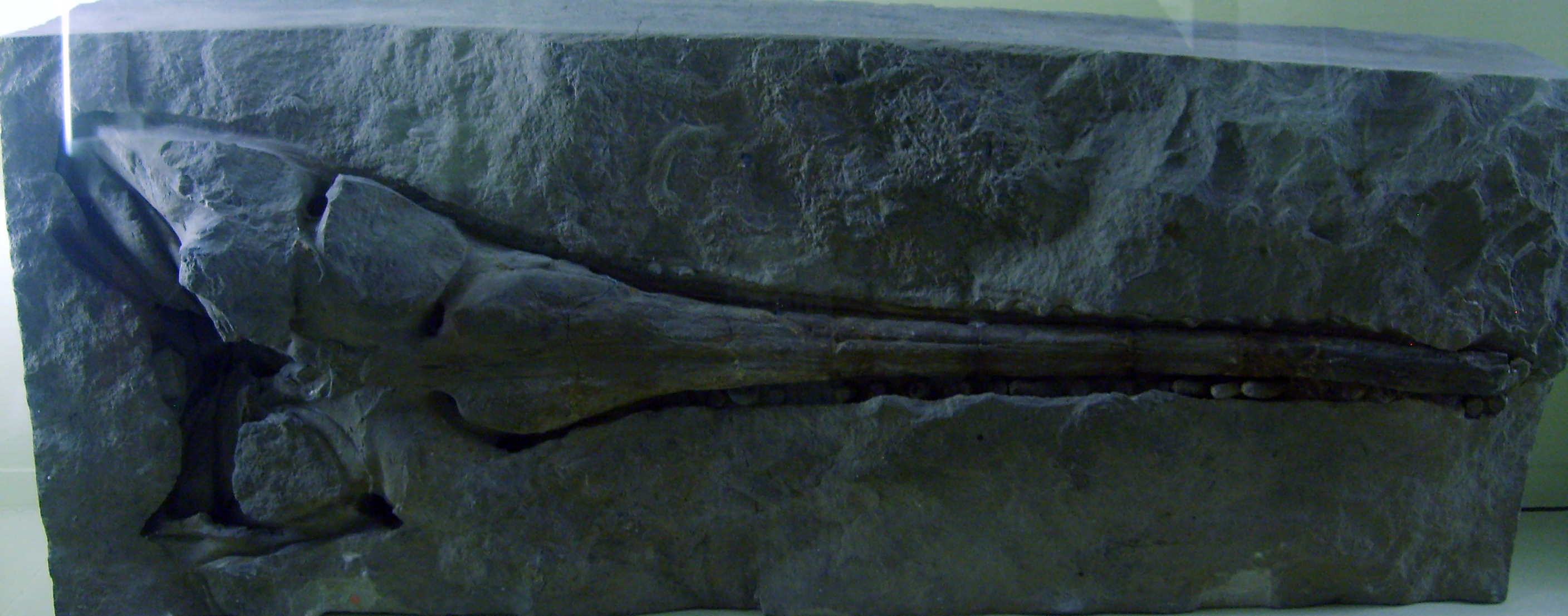
- Pholidosaurus meyeri skull fossil at the Museum für Naturkunde, Berlin

Scientific classification
- Kingdom: Animalia
- Phylum: Chordata
- Class: Reptilia
- Clade: Archosauria
- Clade: Pseudosuchia
- Clade: Crocodylomorpha
- Family: †Pholidosauridae
- Genus: †Pholidosaurus; Meyer, 1841

Species
- †P. meyeri (Dunker, 1844); †P. purbeckensis? Salisbury, 2002; †P. schaumburgensis Meyer, 1841 (type)

Synonyms
- Macrorhynchus Dunker, 1844; Petrosuchus laevidens Owen, 1878 (vide Andrews, 1913); Steneosaurus purbeckensis? Mansel-Pleydell, 1888

= Pholidosaurus =

Pholidosaurus Temporal range: Early Cretaceous, Berriasian–Albian

Extinct genus of reptiles

Pholidosaurus is an extinct genus of neosuchian crocodylomorph. It is the type genus of the family Pholidosauridae. Fossils have been found in northwestern Germany. The genus is known to have existed during the Berriasian-Albian stages of the Early Cretaceous. Fossil material found from the Annero and Jydegård Formations in Skåne, Sweden and on the island of Bornholm, Denmark, have been referred to as a mesoeucrocodylian, and possibly represent the genus Pholidosaurus.

== Description ==
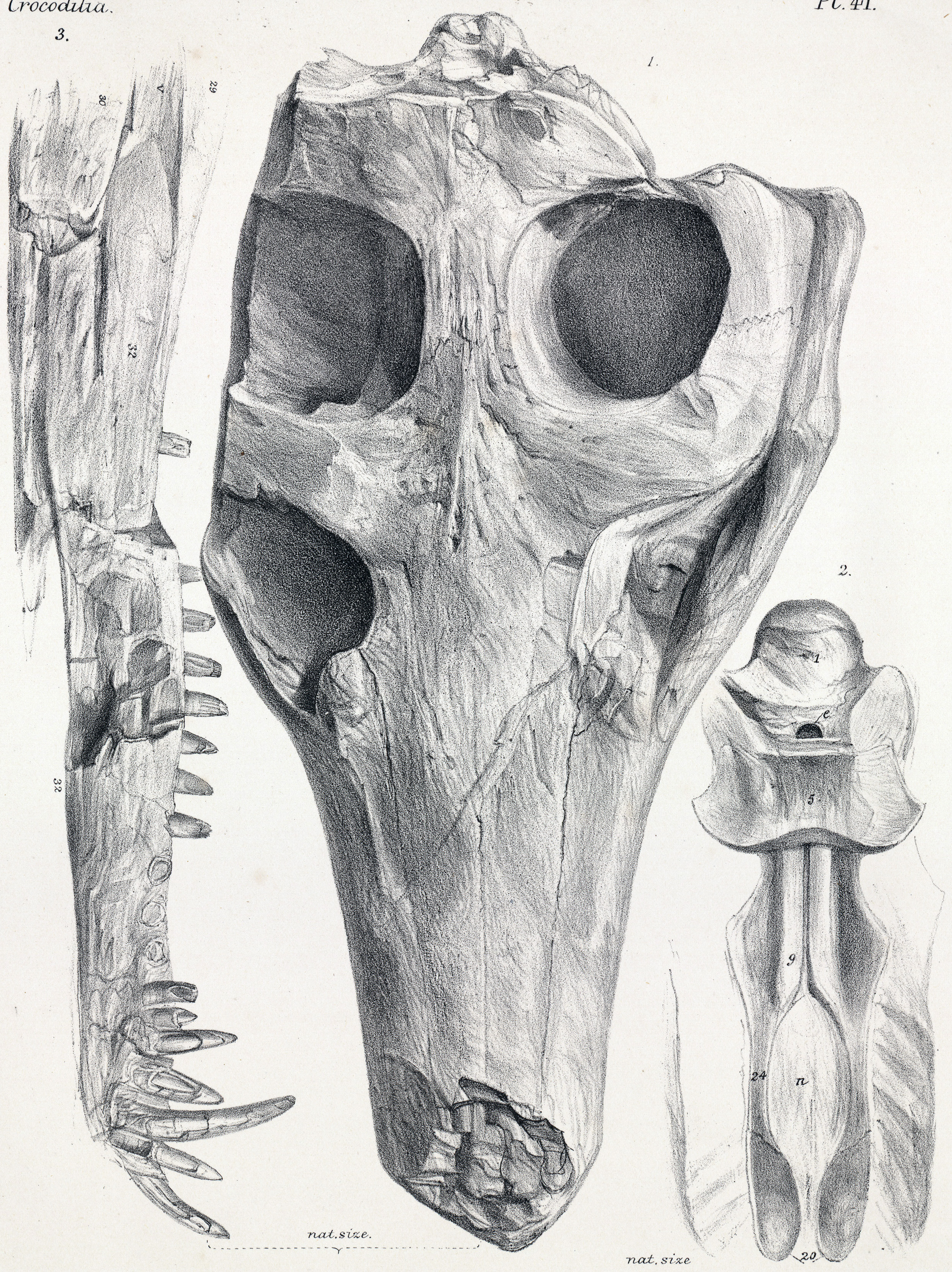
Skull of the possible species Pholidosaurus purbeckensis (originally classed under the genus Petrosuchus)

An early description of the genus by Lydekker (1888) mentioned that the orbit is slightly smaller than the supratemporal fossa, the nasals reach the premaxillae, and the vomer appears on the palate. It is similar in appearance to and about as large as the modern gharial.

== Species ==
The type species of Pholidosaurus is P. schaumburgensis, named in 1841 from the Wealden of Bückeburg, Germany. P. schaumburgensis was named on the basis of a natural mold of part of a thorax discovered in around 1830 from the Berriasian Obernkirchen Sandstein. This mould is known as IMGPGö 741-1. The individual that the mould belonged to is thought to have been around 25 centimetres (9.8 in) in length.

Macrorhynchus is a junior synonym of Pholidosaurus. It was named in 1843 from the same stratigraphic unit and region as P. schaumbergensis, with the type species being M. meyeri. Because M. meyeri bears a strong resemblance to Pholidosaurus schaumburgensis, it is now regarded as a species of Pholidosaurus. It was reassigned to the genus Pholidosaurus in 1887 by Richard Lydekker because of this synonymy, and also because the name Macrorhynchus was preoccupied by a genus of fish named in 1880. P. meyeri differs from P. schaumburgensis in that the bar separating the supratemporal fenestrae is rounded, while in the type species it is angular.

== Misassigned species ==
Pholidosaurus decipiens was erected for a partial cranium, NHMUK 28432, that was originally assigned to the new genus and species Petrosuchus laevidens by Richard Owen in 1878. Petrosuchus laevidens was based on this cranium and a mandibular ramus called BMNH 41099, both of which were collected from Swanage, England. A later study in 1911 concluded that the material belonged to two different species; NHMUK 28432 was reassigned to Pholidosaurus and NHMUK 41099 was designated the lectotype of Petrosuchus laevidens. The species name decipiens was coined in reference to Owen's oversight, and Petrosuchus is now considered a junior synonym of Goniopholis simus.

Another species from England, P. purbeckensis, was originally described as a species of Steneosaurus in 1888. The holotype is an almost complete cranium, referred to as DORCM G97, missing the anterior portion of the rostrum. The skull was found from either Swanage or the Isle of Purbeck (hence the species name), although the exact locality from which the skull originated is not specified by the author of the original description. This material was also once referred to Macrorhynchus. The author of the 1888 description considered S. purbeckensis an intermediate form between Steneosaurus and Teleosaurus. However, in 2002, a new study showed that S. purbeckensis was conspecific with P. decipiens, creating the new combination Pholidosaurus purbeckensis.

Another species of Pholidosaurus, P. laevis, was named in 1913 from Swanage, based on the partial cranium NHMUK R3414. This has been considered a junior synonym of P. purbeckensis by both Salisbury et al. (1999) and Salisbury (2002).

In an SVPCA abstract, Smith et al. (2016) noted that Pholidosaurus purbeckensis is not congeneric with the type species, and instead is closely related to Fortignathus and members of Dyrosauridae.

== Classification ==
Phylogenetic position of Pholidosaurus

Sereno et al. 2001

- Neosuchia
  - - - Sunosuchus
      - Goniopholis
    - - Pholidosaurus
      - - Dyrosaurus
        - - Terminonaris
          - Sarcosuchus
  - - Bernissartia
    - Crocodylia

Pol 2003

- Neosuchia
  - - Theriosuchus
    - Alligatorium
  - - - Sokotosuchus
      - Dyrosaurus
    - - Pholidosaurus
      - - Pelagosaurus
        - - Teleosauridae
          - Metriorhynchidae
  - Eutretauranosuchus
  - - Goniopholis
    - - Bernissartia
      - - Hylaeochampsa
        - Borealosuchus
        - Gavialis
        - Crocodylus
        - Alligator

Richard Lydekker assigned Pholidosaurus to the family Goniopholididae in 1887 along with Hylaeochampsa, Theriosuchus, Goniopholis, and Petrosuchus because the vertebrae are amphicoelus and the orbit communicates with the lateral temporal fossa.

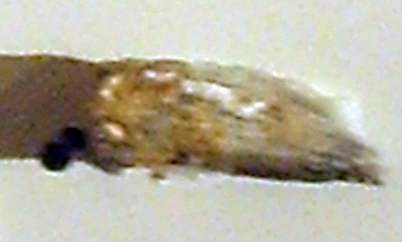
Possible Pholidosaurus tooth (DK164) from the Jydegaard Formation at the Geological Museum in Copenhagen

Pholidosaurus has often been grouped with other longirostrine, or long-snouted, crocodylomorphs, including dyrosaurids and thalattosuchians. Buckley and Brochu (1999) concluded that Pholidosaurus, Sokotosuchus, Dyrosauridae, and Thalattosuchia formed a longirostrine clade that was the sister taxon to Crocodylia. However, Thalattosuchia was traditionally considered a more basal clade of crocodylomorphs, being a more basal lineage of Mesoeucrocodylia than dyrosaurids or Pholidosaurus, both of which were considered neosuchians. The results of the phylogenetic analysis by Buckley and Brochu (1999) were attributed to the similarity in characters associated with snout elongation seen in these crocodylomorphs, even though these characters may have been independently derived in each group. More recent studies have revealed Thalattosuchia as a more basal clade when dyrosaurids are removed from the data set.

More recent studies show that Pholidosaurus is closely related to the Thalattosuchia, with both taxa closely related to a clade containing Terminonaris and the Dyrosauridae. In a phylogenetic analysis conducted by Sereno et al. (2001), Pholidosaurus was placed as a distant sister taxon to the other longirostrine crocodylomorphs, with Terminonaris and the newly named Sarcosuchus being closely related to one another and Dyrosaurus being the next closest taxon to the group. The later phylogenetic analysis of Brochu et al. (2002) again showed that Pholidosaurus was closely related to Thalattosuchia. In the study, both taxa formed a clade that was the sister taxon to a clade containing Sokotosuchus and Dyrosauridae. Jouve et al. (2006) concluded that Pholidosaurus was closely related thalattosuchians were also included within the family, which would be considered paraphyletic without them. Jouve et al. (2006), like Buckley and Brochu (1999), attributed this result to phylogenetic problems that exist among longirostrine crocodylomorphs due to similarities in their morphology.
