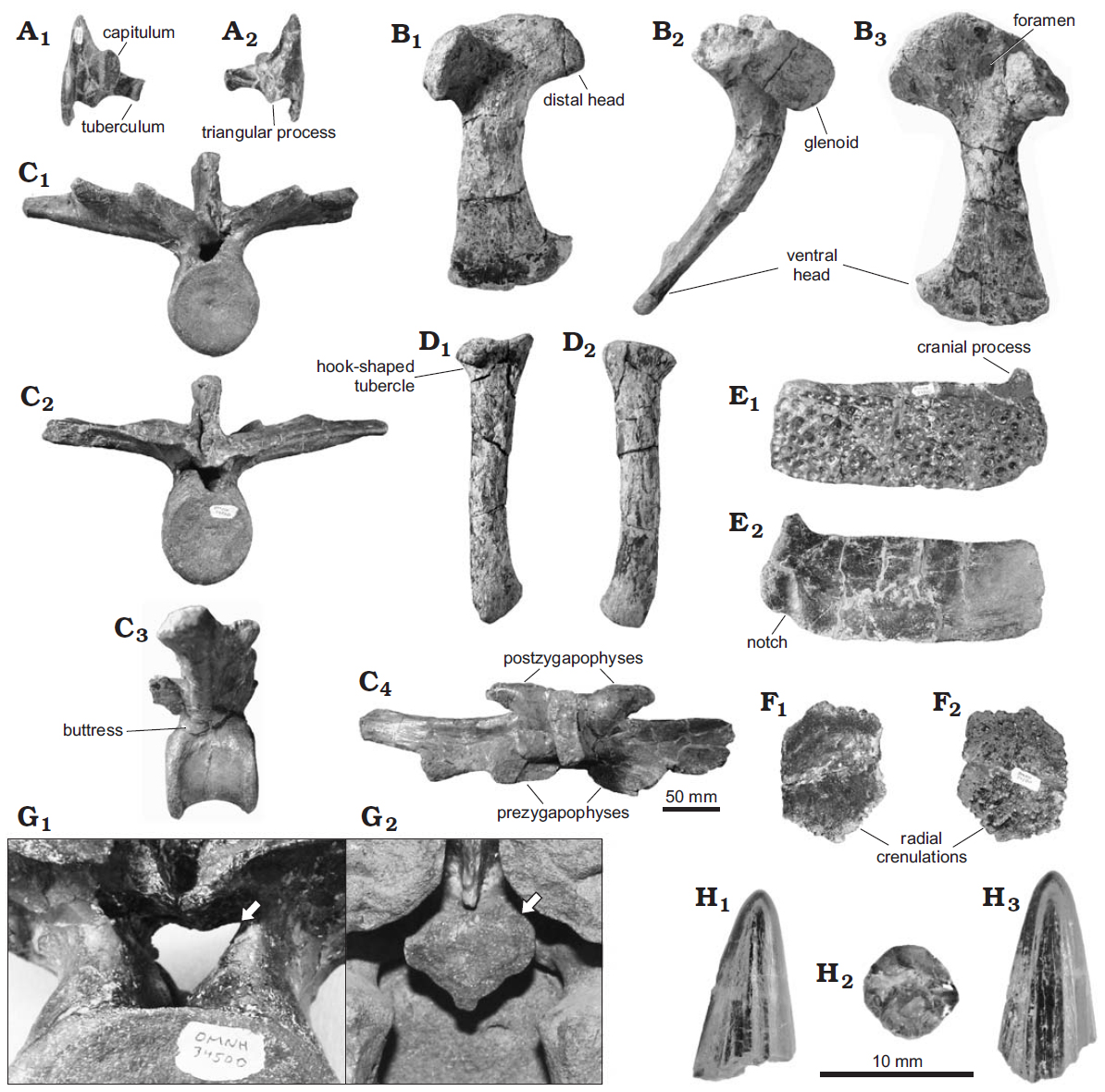
- Fossils from Utah

Scientific classification
- Kingdom: Animalia
- Phylum: Chordata
- Class: Reptilia
- Clade: Pseudosuchia
- Clade: Crocodylomorpha
- Family: †Goniopholididae
- Genus: †Dakotasuchus; Mehl, 1941

Type species
- †Dakotasuchus kingi Mehl, 1941

= Dakotasuchus =

Dakotasuchus Temporal range: Late Cretaceous, 96–93.5 Ma

Extinct genus of reptiles

Dakotasuchus (meaning "Dakota [Sandstone] crocodile") is a genus of goniopholidid mesoeucrocodylian. Its fossils have been recovered from the Cenomanian-age Upper Cretaceous Dakota Sandstone of Kansas. The type specimen was found in an iron-cemented sandstone concretion near Salina. This concretion was broken into two large pieces; more of the specimen was probably present originally, but by the time it was found only the torso and short portions of the neck and tail remained. Twenty pairs of bony scutes ran down the midline of the back. The vertebrae lacked the procoelous articulation (concave anterior and convex posterior faces) of more derived crocodyliforms. Dakotasuchus had short broad shoulder blades, suggesting it had stout powerful forelimbs and perhaps terrestrial habits. M. G. Mehl, who described the genus, estimated the length of the type individual when complete to have been 3–4 metres (9.8–13.1 ft). The type species is D. kingi, named for Professor King, a former dean of Kansas Wesleyan University. Mehl did not classify his new genus to a more inclusive group than Mesosuchia (a paraphyletic group replaced by Mesoeucrocodylia). Robert Carroll assigned Dakotasuchus to Goniopholididae in 1988. In 2017, fossils of Dakotasuchus kingi which consisted of a coracoid, scutes, a dorsal vertebrate and postcranial bones were found in Utah, specifically in the Cedar Mountain Formation's Mussentuchit Member.
