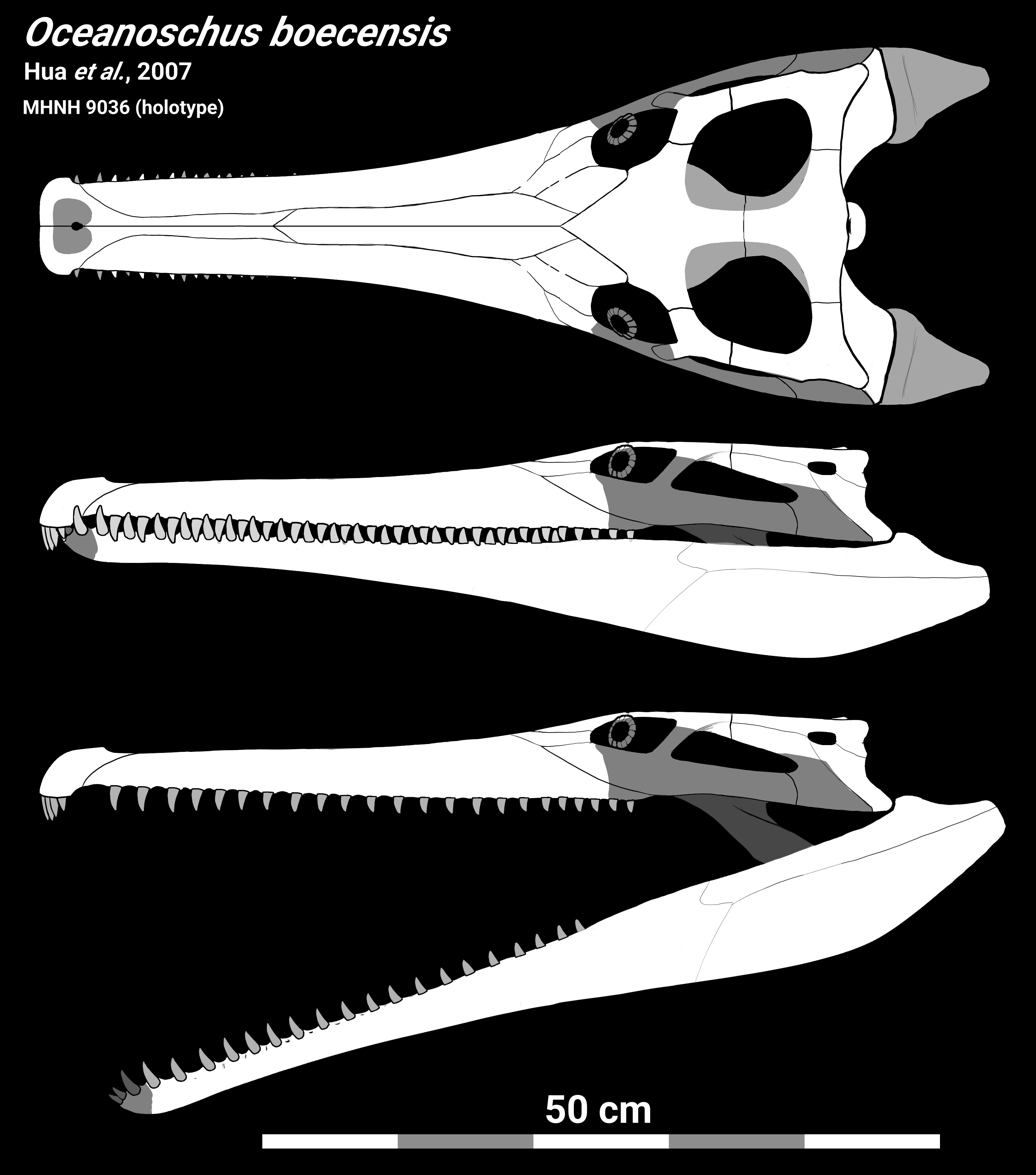
- Skull diagram
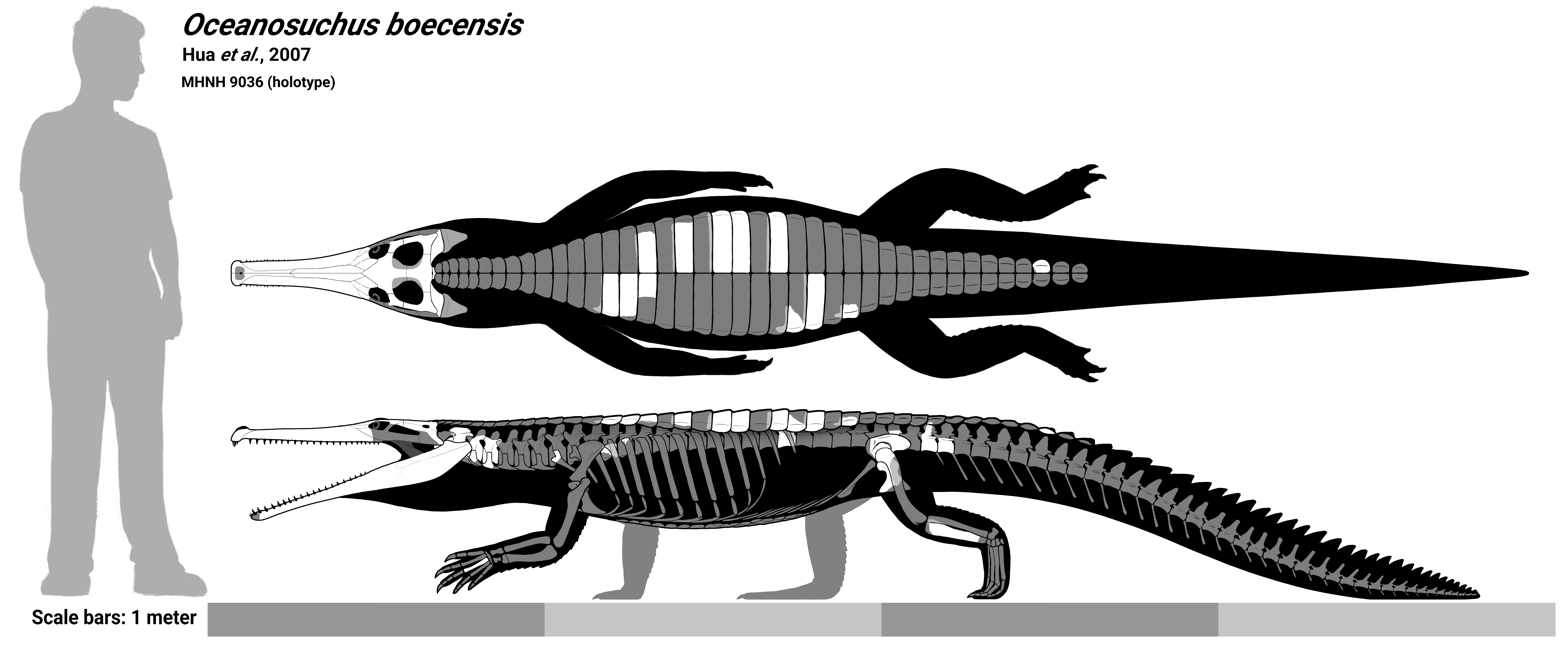
- Skeletal diagram of the holotype, known remains in white

Scientific classification
- Kingdom: Animalia
- Phylum: Chordata
- Class: Reptilia
- Clade: Archosauria
- Clade: Pseudosuchia
- Clade: Crocodylomorpha
- Family: †Pholidosauridae
- Genus: †Oceanosuchus; Hua et al., 2007

Type species
- †O. boecensis Hua et al., 2007

= Oceanosuchus =

Oceanosuchus Temporal range: Late Cretaceous

Extinct genus of reptiles

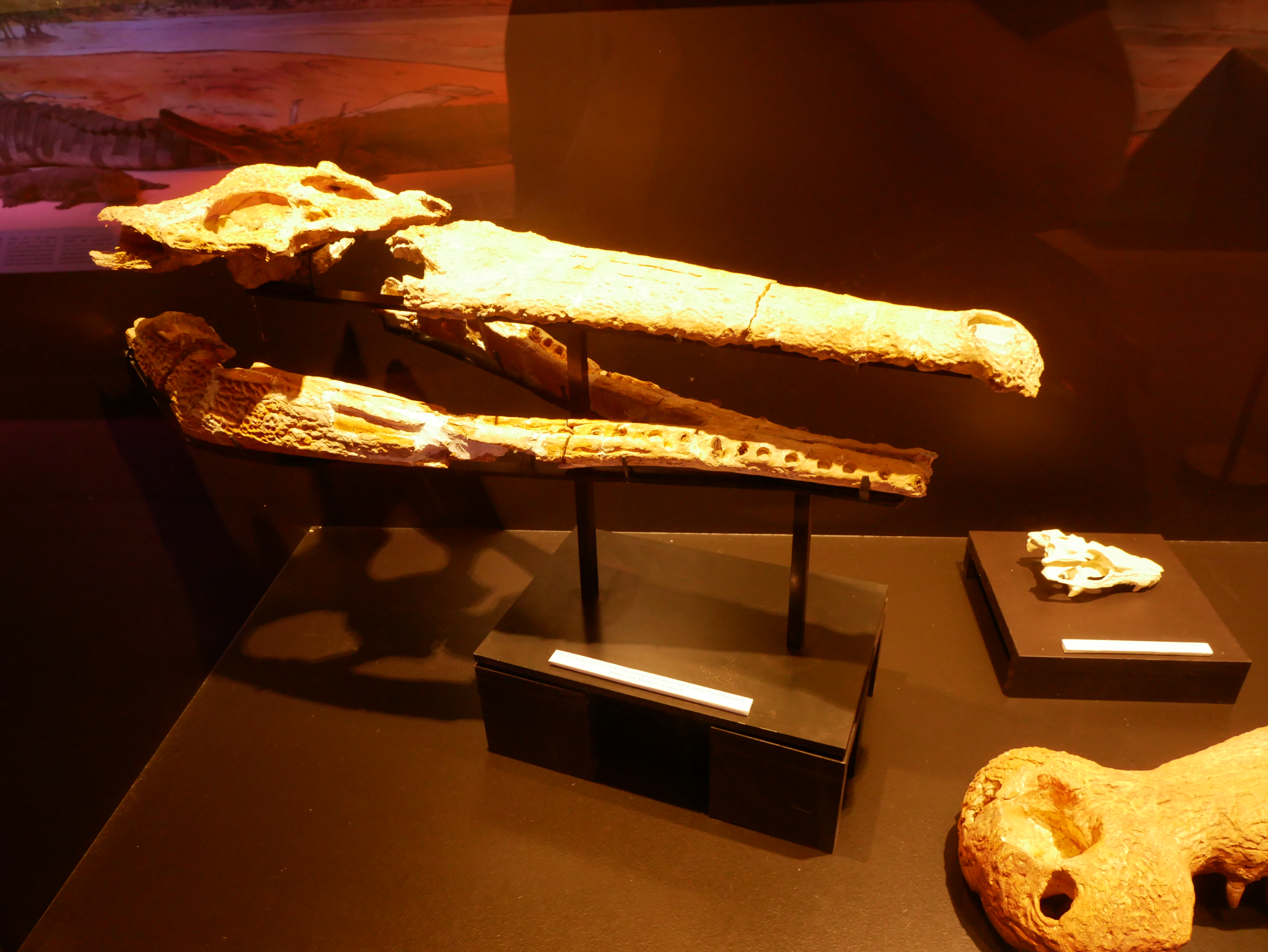
Skull of Oceanosuchus boecensis (cast)

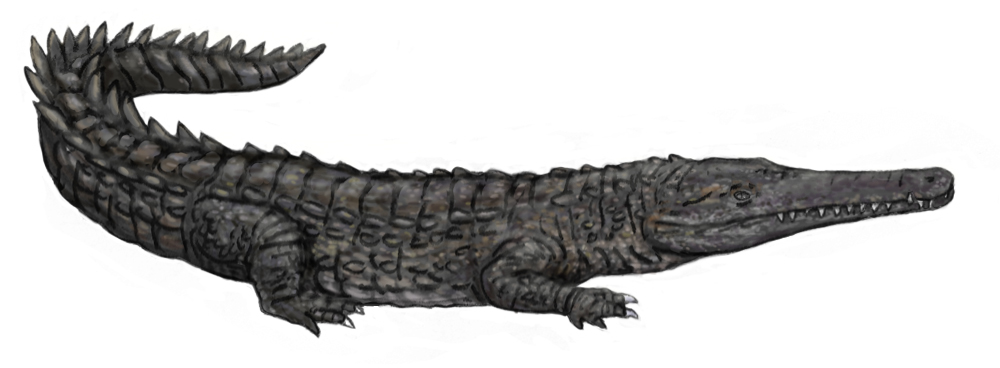
Life restoration

Oceanosuchus is a genus of pholidosaurid mesoeucrocodylian, a type of marine crocodylomorph. It is known from a skull and partial skeleton found in early Cenomanian-age rocks from Normandy, France. The rostrum of the skull was relatively short compared to other pholidosaurids. Oceanosuchus was described in 2007 by Hua and colleagues. The type species is O. boecensis.
