= Meridiosaurus =

Meridiosaurus Temporal range: Kimmeridgian ~150–145.5 Ma

Scientific classification
- Kingdom: Animalia
- Phylum: Chordata
- Class: Reptilia
- Clade: Archosauria
- Clade: Pseudosuchia
- Clade: Crocodylomorpha
- Family: †Pholidosauridae
- Genus: †Meridiosaurus; Mones, 1980
- Species: †M. vallisparadisi

Binomial name
- †Meridiosaurus vallisparadisi Mones, 1980

Extinct genus of reptiles

Meridiosaurus is an extinct genus of mesoeucrocodylian that is a member of the family Pholidosauridae. Remains have been found in the Late Jurassic Tacuarembó Formation in Tacuarembó, Uruguay. The genus was described in 1980 on the basis of a partial rostrum that included the premaxillae and most of the maxillae. The assignment to Pholidosauridae is considered doubtful by some authors, but a 2011 redescription and phylogenetic analysis confirmed the pholidosaurid classification of Meridiosaurus.
