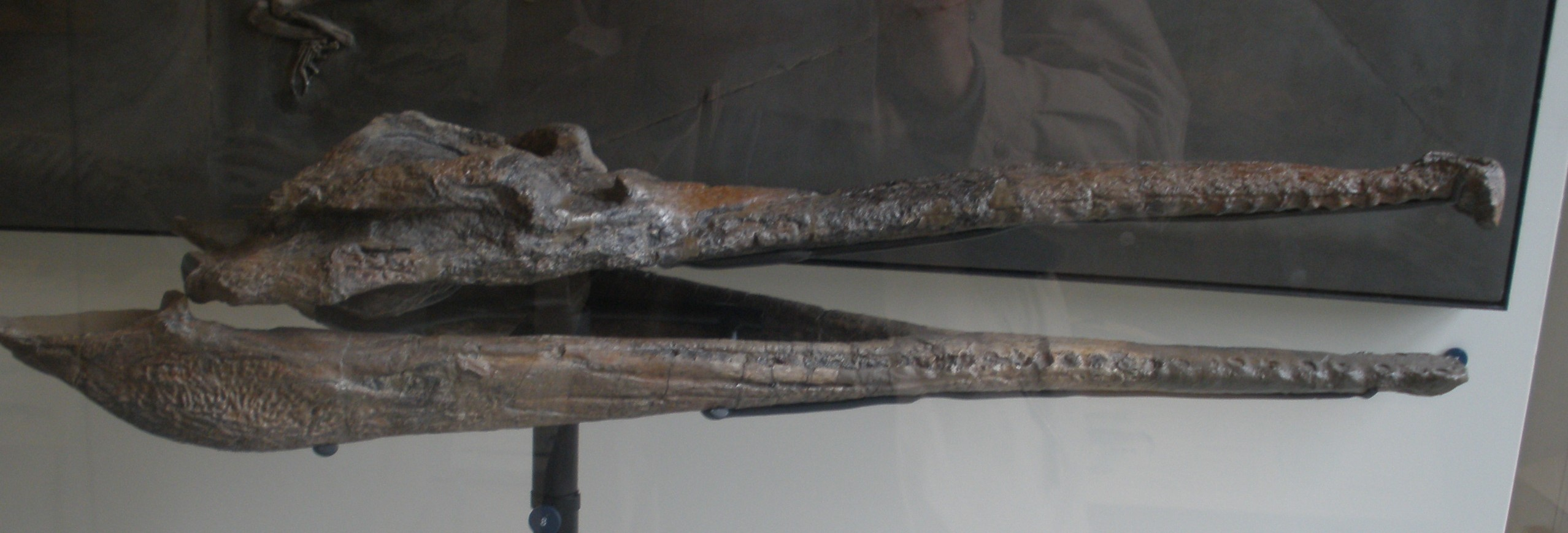
- T. robusta skull (AMNH 5850) in the American Museum of Natural History
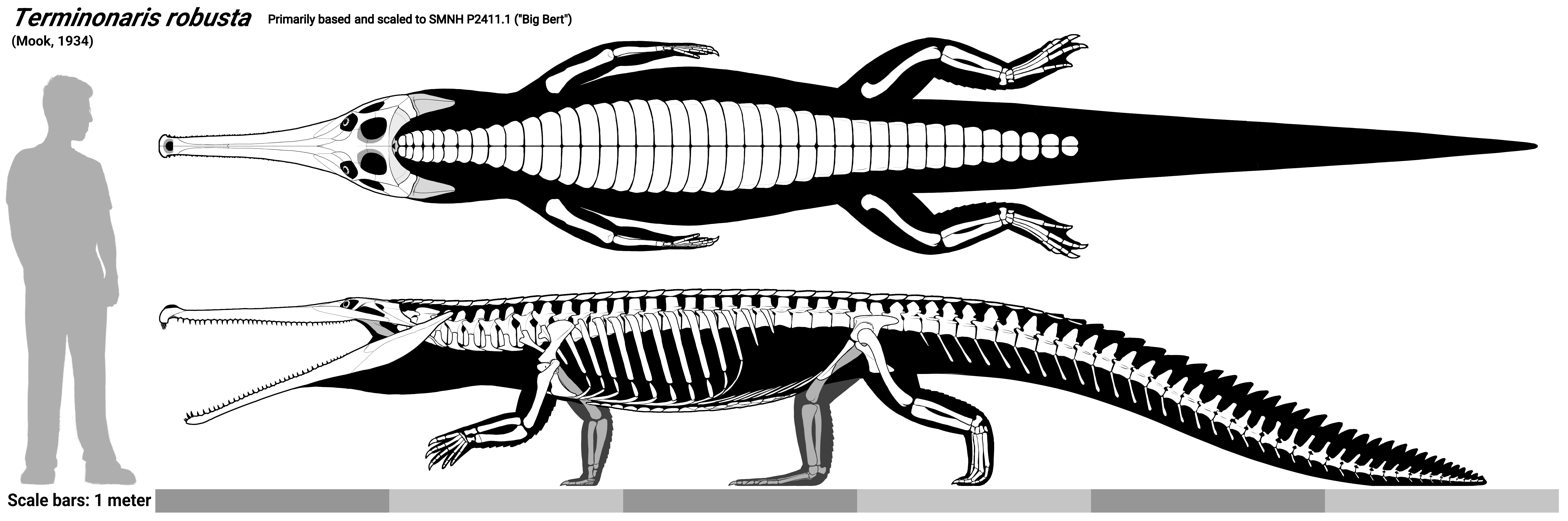
- Skeletal reconstruction of SMNH P2411.1 ("Big Bert")

Scientific classification
- Kingdom: Animalia
- Phylum: Chordata
- Class: Reptilia
- Clade: Pseudosuchia
- Clade: Crocodylomorpha
- Family: †Pholidosauridae
- Genus: †Terminonaris; Osborn, 1904

Species
- †T. browni (type species); †T. robusta (Mook, 1934)

= Terminonaris =

Terminonaris Temporal range: 96–91 Ma Cenomanian - Turonian

Extinct genus of reptiles

Terminonaris is a genus of extinct pholidosaurid crocodyliforms that lived during the Late Cretaceous (Cenomanian and Turonian) epoch. The name means: “enlarged snout or nose” at the front of the skull. Terminonaris is an early crocodile, within a subgroup called Mesoeucrocodylia. Its remains have only been found in North America and Europe. It was once believed to be a teleosaurid (a family of marine gavial-like thalattosuchians). Both prehistoric crocodiles such as Terminonaris, as well as modern crocodiles, belong to the same group called crocodyliformes, although modern crocodiles have specific features that indicate they are distant relatives of this species and members of the subgroup Eusuchia.

When Henry Fairfield Osborn described this taxon in 1904, he named it Teleorhinus, but also suggested alternative name Terminonaris in the same publication, considering the case that the former was preoccpuied. The generic name Teleorhinus was preoccupied by a miridae bug in 1890.

== Description ==
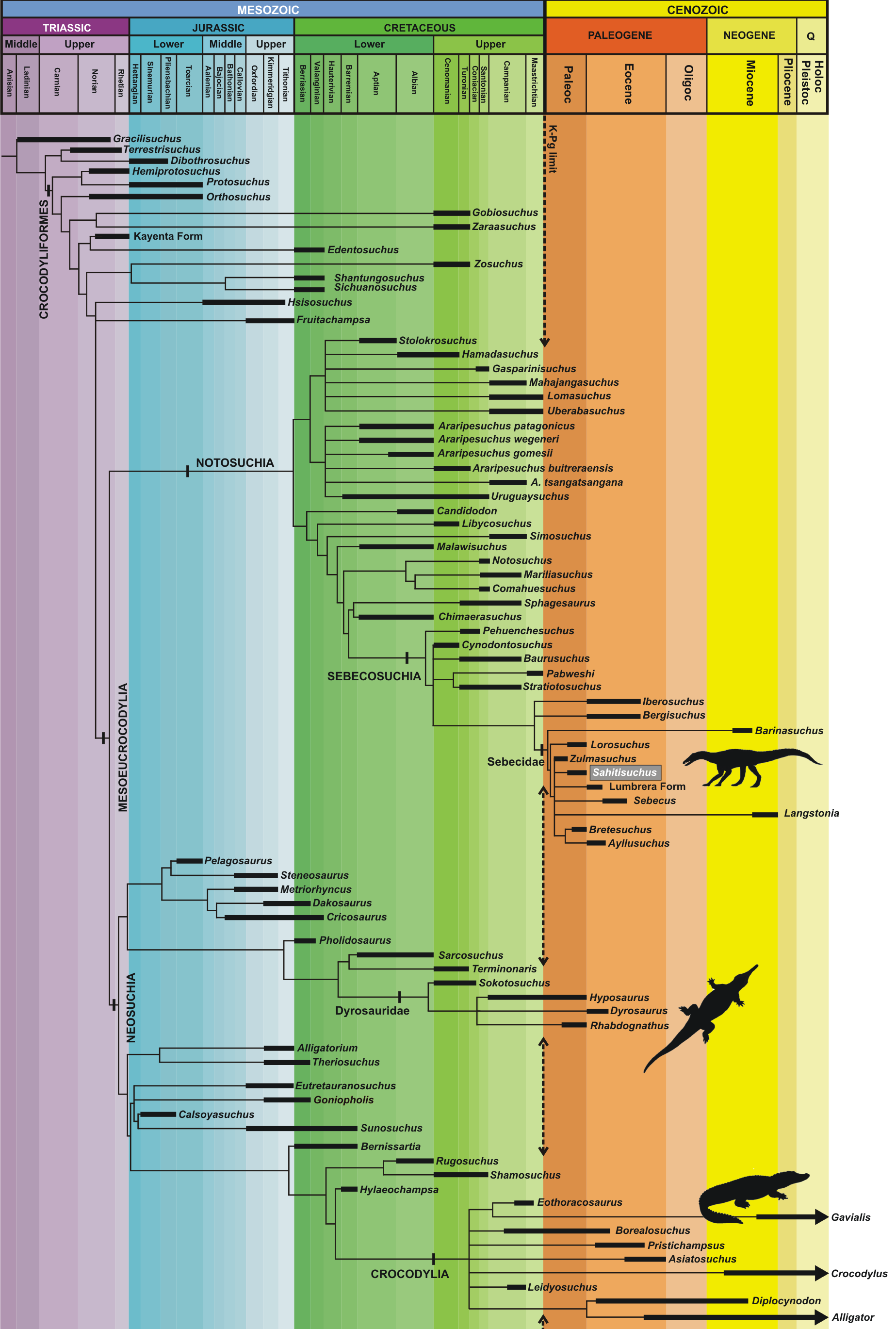

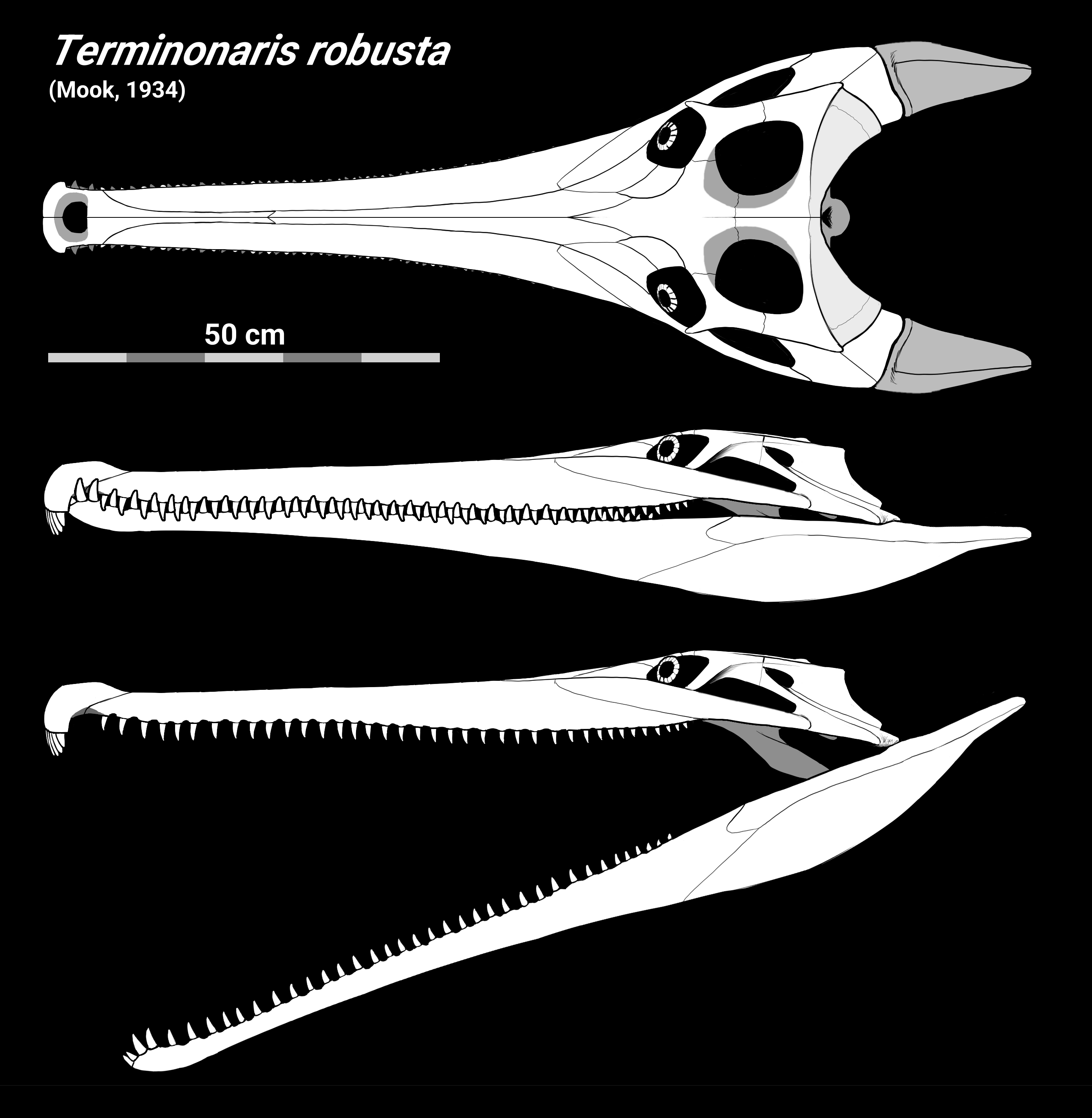
Skull diagram of T. robusta

Terminonaris was a predator that could reach a length of about 6 metres (20 feet). The skull of the largest individual is 109.6 cm (43.1 in) long. The elongated snout and the long, relatively thin interlocking teeth suggest that Terminonaris was a hunter of fish, small mammals and possibly small dinosaurs.

It is also the most derived crocodile-relative found to possess scleral rings

== Habitat ==
Terminonaris inhabited the Western Interior Seaway, an inland sea that stretched from the Gulf of Mexico to the Arctic Ocean during Late Cretaceous time. The creature probably kept close to the shore, venturing into the seaway's warm salty water only to hunt for fish. Like modern crocodiles and alligators, Terminonaris would have eaten whatever it could catch, including small mammals and dinosaurs.

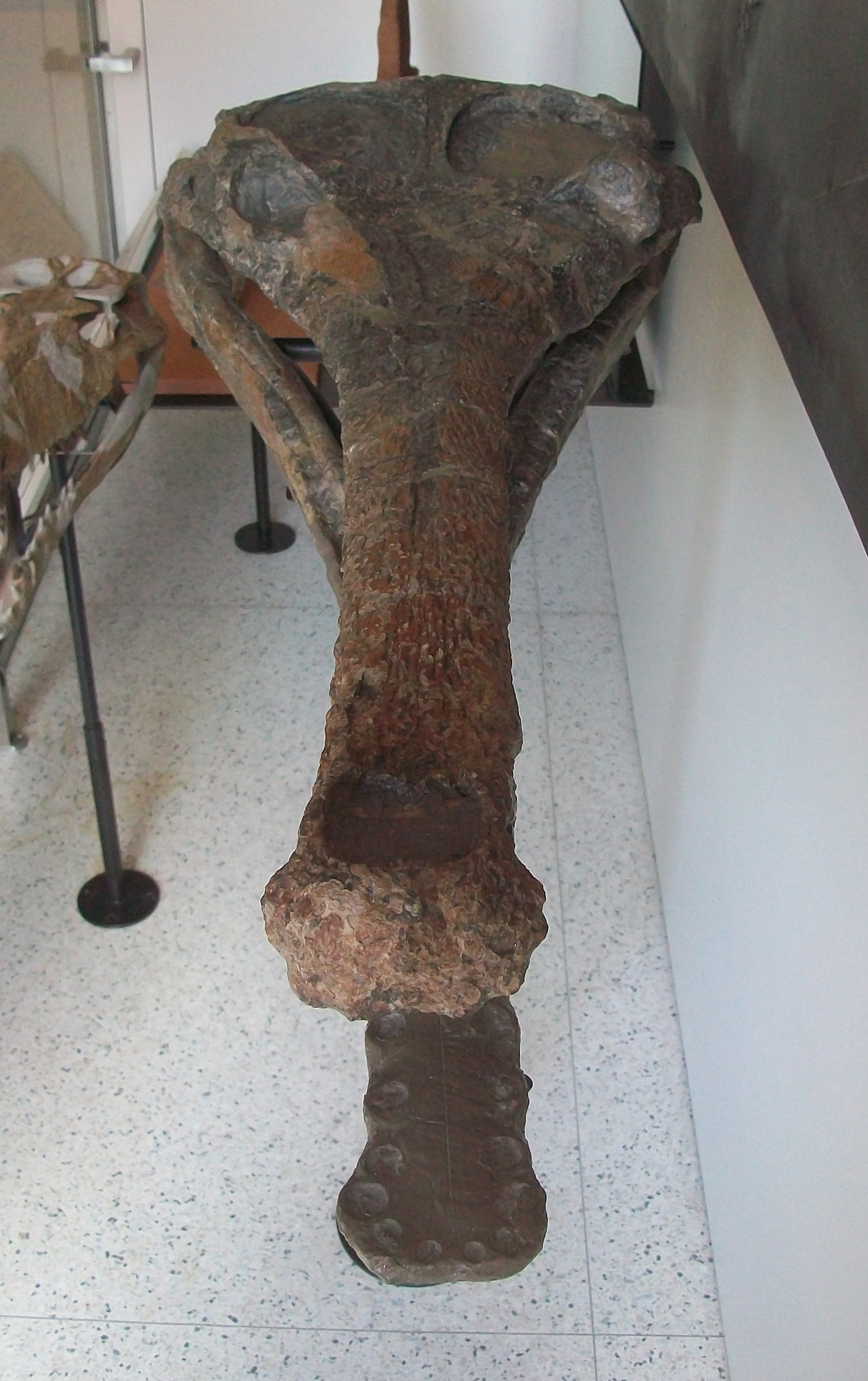
Front view of a T. robusta skull (AMNH 5850)

== Specimens ==
Seven fossil specimens of Terminonaris have been discovered and all are from the Northern Hemisphere: six from North America and one from Europe. Scientists originally thought that Terminonaris originated in Europe, and then migrated across the Atlantic Ocean and dispersed throughout North America. However, it now seems more likely that Terminonaris originated in Texas and then dispersed northward. All of the Terminonaris fossils from North America have been found along the shores of the former Western Interior Seaway. A Kansas specimen is the most recent, having lived about 91 million years ago, while those from Saskatchewan and Montana date from around 93 million years ago. The Terminonaris from Germany is believed to be from 94 million years ago. The oldest, from Texas, lived about 96 million years ago. Recently identified maxilla piece was found in the Frontier Formation in Wyoming, dating 95 Ma.

== Big Bert ==
Big Bert is currently the world's most complete skeleton of Terminonaris robusta. His bones were discovered in 1991 in an outcrop of the Favel Formation along the banks of the Carrot River in the Pasquia Hills of Saskatchewan. They were encased in an olive-black shale that smelled of oil. The discovery was made by paleontologist Tim Tokaryk from the Royal Saskatchewan Museum, guided by local fossil hunter Dickson Hardie. The skeleton was recovered in 1992 by a team from the Royal Saskatchewan Museum and the Canadian Museum of Nature. They used explosives to dislodge some of the overburden that covered the skeleton. The area where Bert was discovered has yielded many fossils, including remains of birds, sharks, bony fish, dinosaurs, turtles, and plesiosaurs. At the time of discovery, Bert was the only one of his genus found in Canada.

Big Bert is believed to have lived about 92 million years ago, at a time when the Carrot River area was near the eastern shoreline of the Western Interior Seaway.

Two models were cast from the fossilized bones of the original skeleton. One travels through Saskatchewan, visiting different museums. The second was installed at the Pasquia Regional Park in the Dickson Hardie Interpretive Centre, near Bert's Carrot River home.

== Texas Terminonaris ==
In 2005 an amateur fossil enthusiast and rural mail carrier named Brian Condon discovered a 96 million year old Terminonaris while fossil-hunting close to his home on Lake Lewisville near Dallas, Texas. The fossils were located in an outcrop of the Woodbine Formation. Mr. Condon donated the fossils to Southern Methodist University's Shuler Museum of Paleontology. They turned out to be the oldest examples of Terminonaris, as well as the southernmost found to date.
