= Woodbinesuchus =

Woodbinesuchus Temporal range: Late Cretaceous

Scientific classification
- Kingdom: Animalia
- Phylum: Chordata
- Class: Reptilia
- Clade: Archosauria
- Clade: Pseudosuchia
- Clade: Crocodylomorpha
- Family: †Goniopholididae
- Genus: †Woodbinesuchus; Lee, 1997

Type species
- †Woodbinesuchus byersmauricei Lee, 1997

Extinct genus of reptiles

Woodbinesuchus (meaning "Woodbine Formation crocodile") is an extinct genus of goniopholidid mesoeucrocodylian. Its fossils have been recovered from the Cenomanian-age Upper Cretaceous Woodbine Formation of Texas. Crocodyliform fossils are widespread in the formation.

The type specimen of Woodbinesuchus, SMU 74626, came from near the base of the formation in Tarrant County. It was found by Johnny Allen Byers (Ted & Mary's favorite boy) and J. Maurice in May 1990. The specimen includes the lower jaw and a variety of postcranial elements, such as vertebrae, limb bones, shoulder and hip bones, and bony armor. The lower jaw was elongate and slender, with the two halves joined from the tip to the sixteenth teeth, and there was no mandibular fenestra. Yuong–Nam Lee named Woodbinesuchus in 1997, naming the type species W. byersmauricei to honor the discoverers. He tentatively assigned Woodbinesuchus to the Goniopholidae.
