= Wadisuchus =

Wadisuchus Temporal range: Late Cretaceous, Campanian

Scientific classification
- Kingdom: Animalia
- Phylum: Chordata
- Class: Reptilia
- Clade: Pseudosuchia
- Clade: Crocodylomorpha
- Family: †Dyrosauridae
- Genus: †Wadisuchus; Saber et al., 2025
- Species: †W. kassabi

Binomial name
- †Wadisuchus kassabi Saber et al., 2025

Extinct genus of reptiles

Wadisuchus is an extinct genus of dyrosaur recovered from Upper Cretaceous deposits in Egypt.

== History and naming ==
The fossil material of Wadisuchus includes four specimens, two nearly complete skulls and two partial lower jaws, all of which were found by the team of Mansoura University during fieldwork in Egypt's Western Desert from 2008 onward. The material comes from two geographically separate localities of the El Hindaw Member of the middle Campanian Quseir Formation. One of the lower jaws was first described by Sara Saber and colleagues in 2025 as the oldest known dyrosaurid remains before a subsequent study led by Saber that same year described the remaining material, recognizing it to represent a distinct form the team named Wadisuchus. Among this material the best preserved skull, specimen MUVP 180, was chosen as the holotype.

Wadisuchus is named for the New Valley Governorate in Egypt, combining the Arabic word "Wadi" meaning valley and the suffix -suchus, the latinized Greek name of the crocodile-headed god Sobek. The species name meanwhile honors Professor Ahmed Salem Kassab of Assiut University, who was chosen for his contributions to Egyptian paleontology and stratigraphy.

== Description ==
The premaxillae, which form the very tip of the elongated snout, have been described as representing somewhat of an intermediate form between what is seen in more basal dyrosauroids and the closely related members of Pholidosauridae and derived dyrosaurids. For example, in both pholidosaurids and Elosuchus the premaxillae are described as "strongly ventrally offset", meaning they form a hook causing the premaxillary teeth to lie significantly below the palatal surface of the maxilla. This offset is eventually lost in derived dyrosaurids which more closely resemble modern crocodilians, however Wadisuchus displays a somewhat reduced version of this offsets as well. The key difference between Wadisuchus and more basal forms is that in the former only two teeth are actually placed on the offset part of the premaxillae, rather than all of them. Another way in which Wadisuchus shows its ties to dyrosaurids is the presence of a prominent open notch just behind the first pair of premaxillary teeth, which in essence serves to receive the dentary teeth when the jaws were closed. This is also seen in more derived dyrosaurids, but not in earlier dyrosauroids like Elosuchus or pholidosaurids, in which the snout tip forms a single uninterrupted curve. Many of these features are thought to tie into the evolutionary elongation of the lower jaw and the dentary bone. As the lower jaw grew larger, the pits for the reception of the first dentary teeth moved forward to create open notches, the second premaxillary tooth was lost and the offset of the premaxillae was reduced.

The premaxillae together are proportionally wide, resembling those of Elosuchus, pholidosaurids and some early dyrosaurids like Anthracosuchus while more derived members of the family are known to have had rather narrow premaxillae. Matching the shape of the premaxillae, the naris is also wider than long and resembles the infinity symbol in shape. The naris open upward like in dyrosaurids and is entirely surrounded by the premaxillae with no contact to the nasal bones.

The lower margin of the maxilla is described as gently undulating of festooned, creating two small waves in the profile that also correspond to an increase in tooth size in these regions. This differs from many of the more derived dyrosaurids, in which the jaws are oftentimes curved more uniformly or even straight.

=== Dentition ===
The dentition of Wadisuchus consisted of four teeth in each premaxilla and at least 14 in each maxilla. The presence of four premaxillary teeth clearly shows the close ties to dyrosaurids, as more basal dyrosauroids still possess five, with the second later having been lost in dyrosaurids. Specimen MUVP 637 suggests that at least 14 teeth were present in the lower jaw as well.

The teeth of Wadisuchus display prominent size-heterodonty, meaning that the tooth size varied significantly based on their position in the jaw. Some of the largest tooth sockets for example reached a width that was over 1.7 times greater than that of the smallest. In the premaxilla the second pair of teeth was the largest, while the fourth was the smallest. The maxilla displays two distinct waves of enlarged tooth sockets, one around the large fourth and another in the region of the ninth and tenth alveoli, with the two peaks separated from each other by smaller teeth, giving the toothrow a gently festooned profile. The posterior maxillary teeth meanwhile are clearly smaller and more densely spaced, showing significantly narrower interalveolar septa. In the lower jaw the fourth and seventh dentary teeth are both notably enlarged.

The spacing between teeth also differs throughout the jaw. The first pair of premaxillary teeth for instance is very closely spaced, leaving little space between them, but the second pair is separated from the first by deep notches that serve to receive the first pair of dentary teeth when the jaws were closed, pushing it closer to the third pair. This particular pattern is also seen in more derived dyrosaurids and regarded as the earliest known example of the "dyrosaurid alveolar patterning" by Saber and colleagues. Due to the way the premaxilla is deflected downward there is also prominent vertical spacing that can be observed, with the first two pairs sitting far below the palatal surface of the maxilla. The third premaxillary tooth is almost on the same level as the maxillary teeth, creating the appearance of a step between the two sets of teeth. In the case of the maxillary teeth, the space between the alveoli seems to grow smaller the further back in the jaw they are located, with those in the posterior-most maxilla being especially densely packed. Looking at the tooth spacing in the lower jaw shows the presence of two tooth couplets, as the sixth and seventh tooth are positioned much more closely to each other, as are the eight and ninth.

While heterodont in size, the tooth morphology is described as homodont, meaning that the dentition of Wadisuchus was consistent in its shape throughout the jaw rather than displaying different tooth shapes. There are however still minor differences between the teeth, for instance the fact that those of the premaxilla show no signs of having had a cutting edge (carina), whereas the maxillary and dentary teeth display well-defined anterior carinae. They are generally elongated, pointed and conical and bear striations that run down the length of each tooth longitudinally. The posterior maxillary teeth furthermore show signs of labiolingual compression, meaning they are flattened side-to-side. This is shared with the dentary teeth behind the mandibular symphysis, which additionally appear to have been lateromedially compressed.

=== Size ===
Saber and colleagues estimated both the body length and mass of the holotype specimen MUVP 180 as well as those of the second known skull, MUVP 636, in both cases basing their primary estimate on the methodology of O'Brien et al. (2019), meaning that rather than employing skull length the results are based on head width. Between the two specimens, MUVP 180 was found to be smaller, with the head width of 33.77 cm (13.30 in) yielding a total body length of roughly 3.51 m (11.5 ft), a snouth-vent [sic?] length of around 1.87 m (6 ft 2 in) and a body mass ranging between 199.75–265.15 kg (440.4–584.6 lb). Specimen MUVP 636, having a head with of 40.93 cm (16.11 in), was estimated to have reached a total body length of 4.12 m (13.5 ft), a snout-vent length of 2.18 m (7 ft 2 in) and a weight of around 351.52–470.77 kg (775.0–1,037.9 lb). Using Paul Serenno's skull length based equation would result in a total body length of approximately 5.3–6 m (17–20 ft), though Saber and colleagues highlight how these larger results likely reflect broader allometric assumptions of the method and do not align with the size trends seen in dyrosaurids the same way the results using O'Brien's method do.

The holotype specimen fits well into the size range exhibited by typical medium-sized dyrosaurids, whereas MUVP 636, inferred to have been a fully mature individual based on size, may have been among the larger dyrosaurids similar to Rhandognathus and Dyrosaurus, both of which reach lengths of 4–5 m (13–16 ft).

== Phylogeny ==
Several phylogenetic analysis were run using the material of Wadisuchus, once using the different specimens individually, once only scoring the more complete remains and once with all specimens analysed as a single unit. Wadisuchus is consistently recovered as an early-diverging member of the family Dyrosauridae, which alongside Elosuchus and Vectisuchus forms the clade Dyrosauroidea, the sister group to Pholidosauridae within Tethysuchia. Within Dyrosauroidea the analysis suggest that Wadisuchus was more closely related to Chenanisuchus than to Elosuchus, taking the position as the basalmost member of the family.

- Tethysuchia
  - Pholidosauridae
  - Dyrosauroidea
    - Vectisuchus
    - - Elosuchus
      - Dyrosauridae
        - Wadisuchus
        - - Chenanisuchus
          - - Anthracosuchus
            - - Cerrejonisuchus
              - - Phosphatosaurinae
                  - Sokotosuchus
                  - - Brachiosuchus
                    - Phosphatosaurus
                - - Rodeosuchus
                  - - Dorbignysuchus
                    - Hyposaurinae
                      - Hyposaurus
                      - - - Arambourgisuchus
                          - Luciasuchus
                          - Dyrosaurus
                        - - Acherontisuchus
                          - - Atlantosuchus
                            - - Rhabdognathus aslerensis
                              - - Rhabdognathus keiniensis
                                - Congosaurus

== Paleogeography and evolutionary importance ==
Both the age of Wadisuchus as one of the oldest dyrosaurids in the fossil record and its basal position in the family have prompted Saber and colleagues to revise the evolutionary timeline of dyrosaurids to accommodate for the new data. Several dyrosaurids are known from the Cretaceous of Africa, both in the form of more scant remains from Egypt, Sudan, Angola, Mali and Kenya as well as two other named taxa, Brachiosuchus from the Campanian to Maastrichtian Kababish Formation of Sudan and Sokotosuchus from the Maastrichtian Dukamaje Formation of Nigeria. While the latter two are both classified as members of Phosphatosuchinae by Saber et al., the more basal position of Wadisuchus supports the idea that the group as a whole originated in Africa as previously hypothesized. However, since Wadisuchus dates to the middle Campanian, the group may have originated at some point during the Conician or Santonian, dispersed into South America by at least the Campanian and first returned to Africa between the Campanian and Maastrichtian. Based on Wadisuchus and the overall wide range even among early dyrosaurids, the team further suggests that these animals were ancestrally long-snouted coastal piscivores, while short-snouted forms likely only became more prevalent following the Cretaceous-Paleogene Extinction Event and the accompanying disappearance of large marine reptiles such as mosasaurs. At least in regards to its preferred environment, Wadisuchus may have possibly represented an intermediate between older freshwater dyrosauroids like Elosuchus and more derived marine forms, given that the Quseir Formation suggests a mix of both freshwater and saltwater fauna.

== Palaeoecology ==
The Quseir Formation, were remains of Wadisuchus have been found, has been interpreted to represent a calm coastal marine environment or perhaps an ancient lagoon. The fauna of the formation suggests a dynamic ecosystem that saw both marine and freshwater influences, featuring animals like turtles, crocodyliforms and lungfish as well as lamniform sharks and the fish Enchodus.

Saber and colleagues point to several anatomical features that suggest that Wadisuchus may have been a specialized piscivore. For example, the front-most teeth in the jaw possessed striations running down the surface longitudinally, yet lacked the cutting edges seen in maxillary teeth. This suggests that these anterior teeth served for grasping rather than slicing prey. Another supporting factor is that the maxillary teeth were long and slender rather than short and blunt, another trait shared with modern crocodiles specialized in feeding on fish.
