= Sabinosuchus =

Sabinosuchus Temporal range: Late Cretaceous, 70.6–66.043 Ma

Scientific classification
- Kingdom: Animalia
- Phylum: Chordata
- Class: Reptilia
- Clade: Archosauria
- Clade: Pseudosuchia
- Clade: Crocodylomorpha
- Family: †Pholidosauridae
- Genus: †Sabinosuchus; Schiller II et al., 2016
- Species: †S. coahuilensis

Binomial name
- †Sabinosuchus coahuilensis Schiller II et al., 2016

Extinct genus of reptiles

Sabinosuchus (meaning "Sabinas crocodile") is a genus of mesoeucrocodylian from the Maastrichtian Escondido Formation of Coahuila, Mexico, with Sabinosuchus coahuilensis as the type species. First described as a putative dyrosaurid by Shiller II et al. (2016), it was later recovered as a pholidosaurid by Jouve & Jalil (2020).

== History and naming ==
Sabinosuchus was discovered by amateur paleontologist of the Palaeontologos Aficionados de Sabinas A.C. (PASAC) in 2002 in Mexico. All fossils of Sabinosuchus found by the team stem from the Maastrichtian Escondido Formation, although earlier reports wrongfully believed them to stem from the underlying Olmos Formation. The material collected constitutes two individuals known from fragmentary remains that were later reassembled. Due to this the material was catalogued under several specimen numbers. The holotype material was initially catalogued as specimens PAS 945 to PAS 949 and PAS 952 once reassembled to form an almost complete specimen. The other specimen, catalogued as PAS 950 and PAS 951, represents a part of the rostrum alongside an articulated piece of the mandible. All specimens were donated to the El Museo Muzquiz.

The name Sabinosuchus is a combination of Sabinas, a town near the type locality, and the Greek Souchos (crocodile). The species name is likewise based on the area the specimen was found, referring to the state of Coahuila.

== Description ==
Sabinosuchus was a longirostrine animal, meaning its snout was proportionally long and slender. The nasal bones are unfused over their preserved length and covered in teardrop-shaped pits making it the most ornamented skull bone. The maxillae share similar ornamentation, with a dense clutter of circular pits present towards the posterior of the bone. The sides of the bone meanwhile are much smoother by comparison. The mandible is approximately 92 cm (36 in) long, less than half of that consisting of the mandibular symphysis. The first alveoli preserved in the holotype were originally believed to be the first and second, however, reexamination by Jouve and Jalil later showed that these alveoli more likely housed the third and fourth dentary teeth given their lateral placement. These enlarged alveoli give the tip of a dentary a slightly rounded form. The better preserved of the two dentaries preserved nineteen alveoli, adding up to a total of twenty-one following the 2020 examination. Most dentary alveoli are circular in shape and range in diameter from 2.2–4.4 cm (0.87–1.73 in). The thirteenth to fifteenth differ significantly in arrangement however, emerging in a triangular pattern and are followed by closely spaced and smaller alveoli. The teeth are generally robust with a slight curvature towards the tip of the snout, but with better developed curviture and slight anteroposterior compression in the rear portions of the jaw (at least from the seventeenth dentary tooth onward).

== Phylogeny ==
The initial description by Schiller thought Sabinosuchus to be a dyrosaurid, a group of neosuchians found in marine sediments of the Cretaceous to Early Eocene. This assignment was based on the size of the seventh dentary alveolus (smaller than the eight) and the proportions of the mandibular symphysis (approximately as wide as high). However, several problems were found by the authors. The fragmentary remains heavily limit the available characters for the phylogenetic analysis and even fewer are of value for determining its position within the clade. The matter is further complicated by the fact that the analysis recovered Sabinosuchus in a basal position within Dyrosauridae, being recovered as a sister taxa to the brevirostrine Anthracosuchus. However, very little mandibular remains are known from basal dyrosaurs, making comparison difficult. Overall, while first described as a putative dyrosaur, Schiller and colleagues make note that this assignment was poorly supported. Their initial phylogenetic tree is depicted below.

- - Chenanisuchus lateroculi
  - - - Anthracosuchus balrogus
      - Sabinosuchus coahuilensis
    - - Cerrejonisuchus improcerus
      - - - Hyposaurus rogersii
          - - Phosphatosaurus gavialoides
            - Sokotosuchus lanwilsoni
        - - Arambourgisuchus khouribgaensis
          - - - Dyrosaurus maghribensis
              - Dyrosaurus phosphaticus
            - - - Atlantosuchus coupatezi
                - Guarinisuchus munizi
              - - Rhabdognathus aslerensis
                - Rhabdognathus keiniensis

By contrast, Schiller and colleagues identified several morphological features in Sabinosuchus which it shared with taxa used as outgroups in the original analysis, namely Sarcosuchus, Terminonaris and Elosuchus, typically considered to be pholidosaurids (although later analysis recovered Elosuchus as closer to dyrosaurs). Additionally, the absence of a long, curved, retroarticular process was also seen as a possible indication that Sabinosuchus wasn't a dyrosaur, but this element is not preserved in the majority of derived dyrosaurs.

A later study published by Jouve and Jalil in 2020 re-evaluated several taxa previously thought to be dyrosaurs or goniopholids, including Sabinosuchus. Their analysis placed several of these taxa within Pholidosauridae, extending the range of the group into the Maastrichtian. In their analysis, Sabinosuchus claded together with Woodbinesuchus and Oceanosuchus. Importantly, the authors note that what was described as the first and second dentary alveoli in Schiller 2016 actually represented the third and fourth alveoli. Subsequently, the smaller seventh alveolus thought to indicate dyrosaurid affinities would actually be the ninth. In addition, the size difference is not as significant as suggested by Schiller. They conclude that the features present in Sabinosuchus are much more consistent with pholidosaurids, recovering a phylogenetic tree with much stronger support than previous analysis on Sabinosuchus.

- Tethysuchia
  - Pholidosauridae
    - Meridiosaurus vallisparadisi
    - - - Dakotasuchus kingi?
        - - French Pholidosaur
          - - Pholidosaurus schaumbergensis
            - Pholidosaurus purbeckensis
      - - - Woodbinesuchus byersmauricei
          - Sabinosuchus coahuilensis
          - Oceanosuchus boecensis
        - - - Dakotasuchus kingi?
            - Terminonaris spp.
            - MHNM-kh01
          - - Sarcosuchus hartii
            - Sarcosuchus imperator
            - Chalawan thailandicus
  - - Vectisuchus leptognathus
    - - Elosuchus spp.
      - Dyrosauridae
