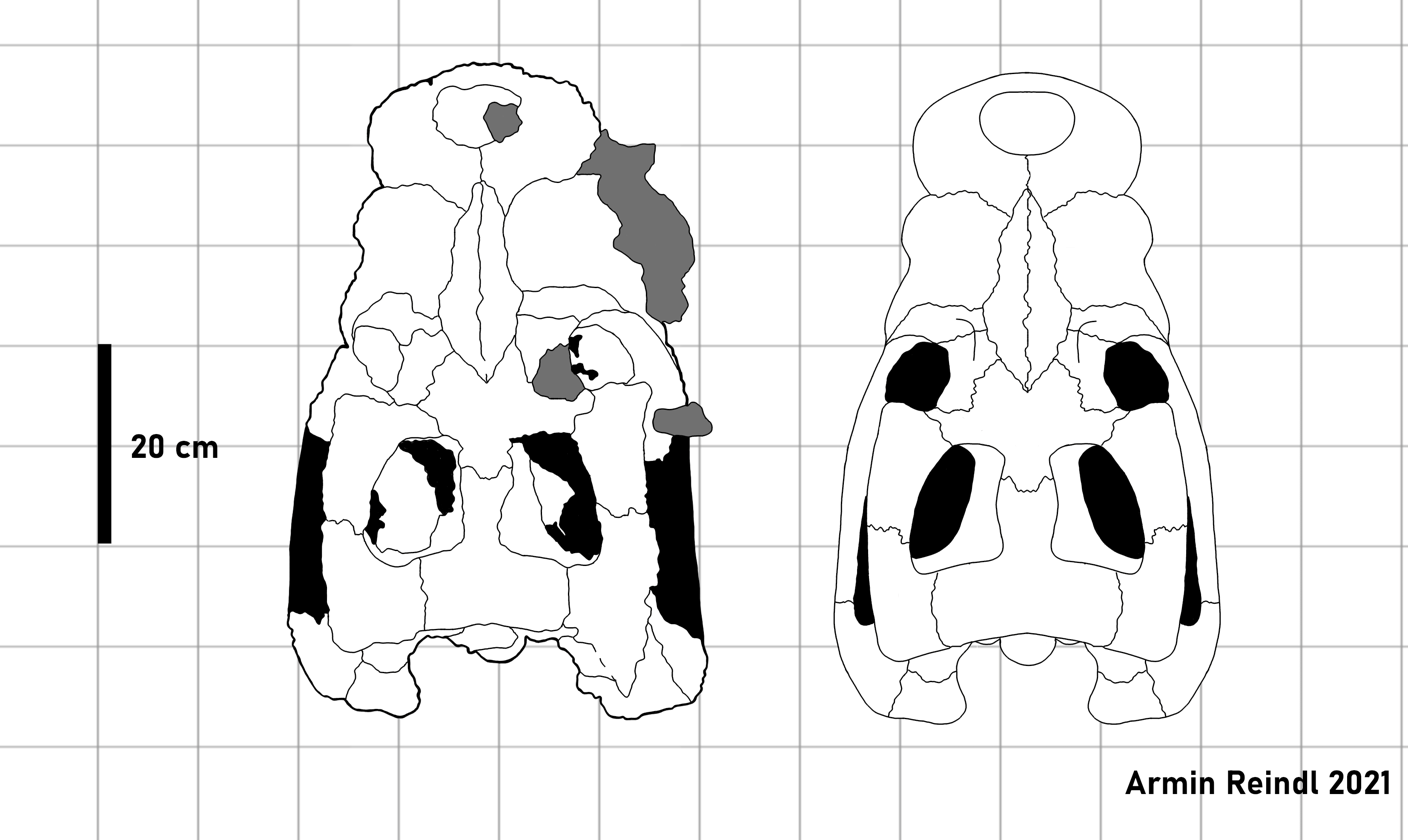
- Skull reconstruction of holotype specimen UF/IGM 67

Scientific classification
- Kingdom: Animalia
- Phylum: Chordata
- Class: Reptilia
- Clade: Pseudosuchia
- Clade: Crocodylomorpha
- Family: †Dyrosauridae
- Genus: †Anthracosuchus; Hastings et al., 2014

Type species
- †Anthracosuchus balrogus Hastings et al., 2014

= Anthracosuchus =

Anthracosuchus Temporal range: Mid-Late Paleocene (Peligran-Itaboraian) ~60–58 Ma

Extinct genus of reptiles

Anthracosuchus (meaning "coal crocodile" in Greek) is an extinct genus of dyrosaurid crocodyliform from the Paleocene of Colombia. Remains of Anthracosuchus balrogus, the only known species, come from the Cerrejón Formation in the Cerrejón mine, and include four fossil specimens with partial skulls. Anthracosuchus differs from other dyrosaurids in having an extremely short (brevirostrine) snout, widely spaced eye sockets with bony protuberances around them, and osteoderms that are smooth and thick. It is one of the most basal dyrosaurids along with Chenanisuchus and Cerrejonisuchus.

== Discovery and naming ==
The first fossil of Anthracosuchus was found in the Cerrejón mine in La Guajira, Colombia, in 2005. This first fossil was UF/IGM 69, a referred specimen of Anthracosuchus. The second specimen followed in early 2007 with two more being discovered later that same year. The species name is a reference to the Balrog, a creature in J. R. R. Tolkien's fantasy novel The Lord of the Rings that could, like the remains of Anthracosuchus, be found in a mine.

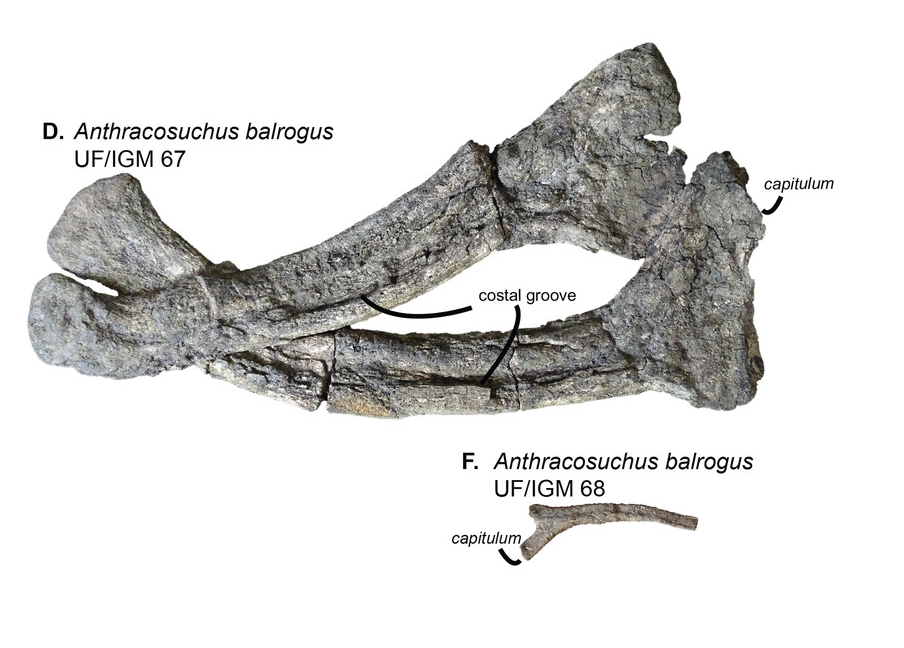
Ribs of Anthracosuchus

The holotype of Anthracosuchus (UF/IGM 67) consists of a nearly complete, dorsoventrally compressed skull, 9 ribs, 7 vertebrae and unidentified bones. The paratype (UF/IGM 68) includes a nearly complete skull in an uncompressed state, however missing the anterior most tip of the premaxilla, the right articular, 3 associated teeth as well as various parts of the postcranial skeleton such as 5 osteoderms, 5 vertebrae, 8 ribs, the distal parts of the pubis and ischium, a haemal arch, a sacral rib as well as a proximal phalanx and several unidentified bones. Both referred specimens, UF/IGM 69 and UF/IGM 70, are solely known from cranial material.

== Description ==
The snout of Anthracosuchus is unusually short and stout for a dyrosaur, making up 44% of the total skull length in the holotype and 52% in the paratype. Additionally, the skull of Anthracosuchus is much more rectangular than triangular, with premaxilla and nares that are much wider than long, an unusual feature amongst its relatives that sets it apart even from other relatively short-snouted genera such as Chenanisuchus and Cerrejonisuchus. Most of the posterior end of the skull is taken up by the flat and broad skull table which in turn houses the large and rectangular supratemporal fenestrae. The external nares are completely surrounded by the premaxilla and untouched by the variably fused nasal. In the two largest specimen, UF/IGM 67 and UF/IGM 68 the bones are unfused, while in the smaller referred specimen UF/IGM 69 the nasals are fused. The orbits are widely placed from the midline of the skull in a more lateral orientation and bordered by rugose tuberosities just anterior and medial to the orbital margin. They differ from the rugose orbital margins of alligatorids by the surrounding unpitted surface and may have been keratinised, however most likely did not support any larger structures. Their exact location varies between specimens, emerging from the lacrimal bones, prefrontals or stretching over both. These tuberosities are most visible in UF/IGM 69. The teeth of Anthracosuchus are broad and blunt.

There are 5 osteoderms associated with Anthracosuchus, all of which possess a thick cross section and an unpitted ventral and dorsal surface, while those of more typical dyrosaurids such as Hyposaurus are flat with wide pits. The surface of the osteoderms has faint grooves emanating from the center of them and show no signs of overlapping with one another. Due to the preservation of the associated skull and that of other fossils found in the same stratigraphic level it is deemed unlikely that this smooth surface was caused by taphonomic weathering.

== Phylogeny ==
The cladogram below shows the inner relationship of Dyrosauridae following the work of Jouve et al. 2020.

- Dyrosauridae
  - Chenanisuchus lateroculi
  - - Anthracosuchus balrogus
    - - Cerrejonisuchus improcerus
      - - Phosphatosaurinae
          - Phosphatosaurus gavialoides
          - Sokotosuchus lanwilsoni
        - - Rodeosuchus machukirui
          - Hyposaurinae
            - Dorbignysuchus niatu
            - - - Arambourgisuchus khouribgaensis
                - Luciasuchus lurusinqa
                - - Dyrosaurus maghribensis
                  - Dyrosaurus phosphaticus
              - - Acherontisuchus guajirensis
                - - Atlantosuchus coupatezi
                  - - Rhabdognathus aslerensis
                    - - Congosaurus bequaerti
                      - Rhabdognathus keiniensis

== Paleobiology ==
Anthracosuchus balrogus has widely placed orbits comparable only to those of Chenanisuchus, while other dyrosaurs have orbits more centrally oriented. Amongst extant crocodylomorphs the only species with similarly wide-set eyes is the gharial (Gavialis gangeticus). A bivariant plot of the width between orbits and the total skull width measured at the orbits showed greater similarity between Anthracosuchus and modern gharials than to other dyrosaurs, Crocodylus niloticus, Caiman crocodilus or Alligator mississippiensis. This could present a deviation of feeding method in Anthracosuchus from other dyrosaurs, possibly subsurface predation. The teeth of Anthracosuchus are broad, blunt and low crowned. This robust dentition may indicate a durophagous diet, preying on hard-shelled prey using a crushing bite. UF/IGM 71, a carapace of a pelomedosoid turtle found in the Cerrejón mine, displays a series of dents, scratches and puncture marks matching attempted predation by a crocodylomorph. The largest of these puncture marks fits with the first maxillary tooth of the Anthracosuchus holotype.

Anthracosuchus' ribs indicate a vertical attachment of the muscles, allowing for a more undulating way of swimming when compared to extant crocodylians, further aided less extensive lateral osteoderm density. Anthracosuchus, whose osteoderms do not imbricate at all, may have had an even greater degree of flexibility compared to other dyrosaurs, at the cost of reduced stability.
