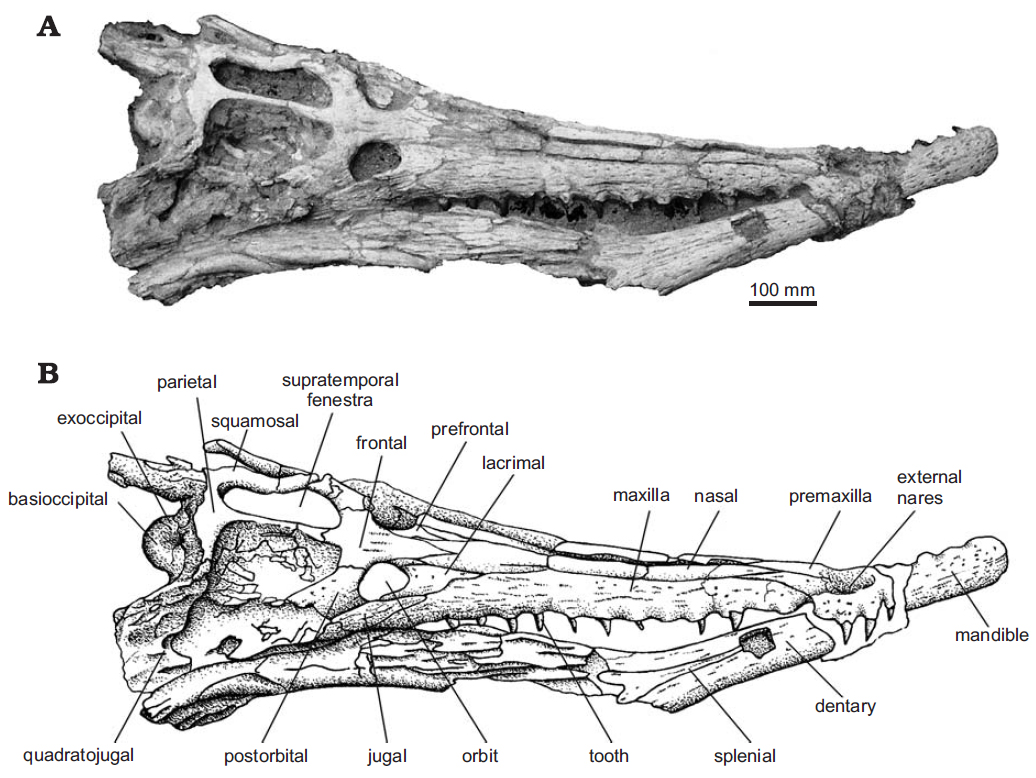
- Skull and line drawing

Scientific classification
- Domain: Eukaryota
- Kingdom: Animalia
- Phylum: Chordata
- Class: Reptilia
- Clade: Archosauria
- Clade: Pseudosuchia
- Clade: Crocodylomorpha
- Clade: Crocodyliformes
- Family: †Dyrosauridae
- Genus: †Arambourgisuchus; Jouve et al., 2005

Type species
- †Arambourgisuchus khouribgaensis Jouve et al., 2005

= Arambourgisuchus =

Arambourgisuchus Temporal range: 59–55 Ma Late Palaeocene

Extinct genus of reptiles

Arambourgisuchus ("Prof. Camille Arambourg's crocodile") is an extinct genus of dyrosaurid crocodylomorph from the late Palaeocene of Morocco, found in the region of Sidi Chenane in 2000, following collaboration by French and Moroccan institutions, and described in 2005 by a team led by palaeontologist Stéphane Jouve. Arambourgisuchus was a large animal with an elongated skull 1 meter in length.

== History and naming ==
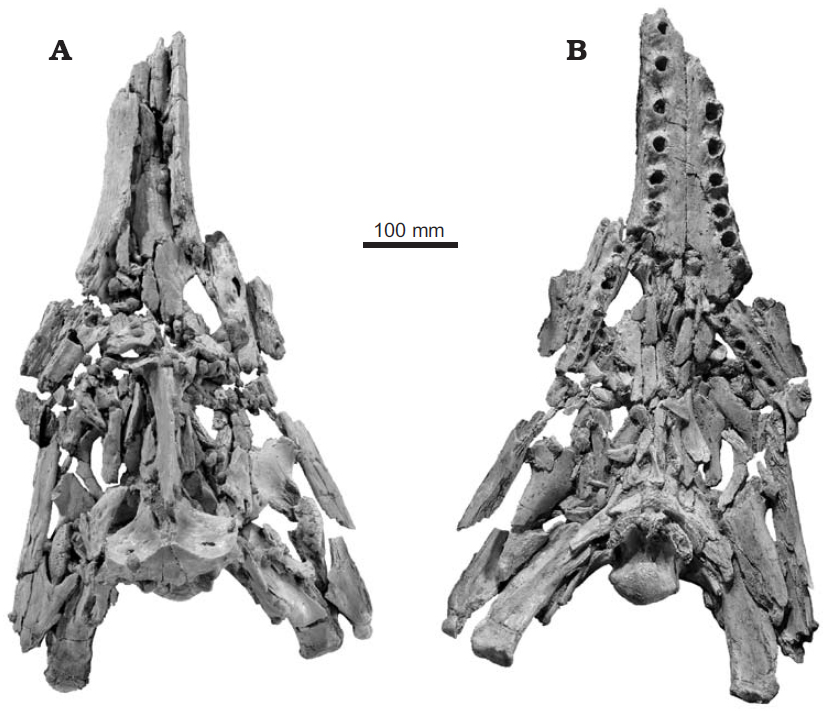
Holotype skull seen from above and below

The fossils of Arambourgisuchus were unearthed in the Spring of 2000 thanks to the collaboration of French (French National Centre for Scientific Research, National Museum of Natural History, France) and Moroccan (Office Chérifien des Phosphates, Ministére de l’Energie et des Mines, Morocco) researchers in the phosphatic deposits of the Ouled Abdoun Basin, Morocco. The deposits of the basin range from the latest Cretaceous (Maastrichtian) to the middle Eocene (Lutetian), with the deposits yielding Arambourgisuchus dating to the Thanetian age of the Paleocene, ca. 59 to 56 Ma. Four specimens have been described by Stéphane Jouve and colleagues. All of them stem from the Sidi Chenane phosphate mine, the holotype OCP DEK−GE 300, a nearly complete but heavily crushed skull, OCP DEK−GE 18 (a crushed skull and mandible) as well as two mandibular elements from two different specimens (OCP DEK−GE 1200 & OCP DEK−GE 269). Although heavily crushed and missing the tip of the rostrum, the holotype specimen can easily be reconstituted and is accessible from all sides. The referred skull OCP DEK−GE 18 does preserve the tip of the snout, however does not allow for the examination of several details of the bones.

Arambourgisuchus is named after French paleontologist Camille Arambourg for his research on the fossil fauna of Morocco's phosphate mines. The species name alludes to the town of Khouribga north of the type locality.

== Description ==
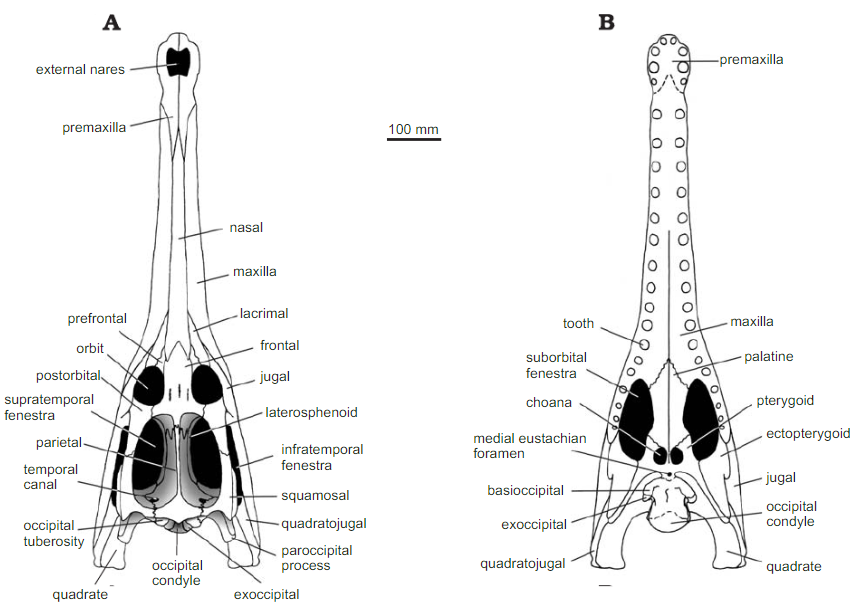
Skull reconstruction of Arambourgisuchus

The skull of Arambourgisuchus measures up to 1 m (3 ft 3 in) in length, most of which being made up by the elongated rostrum. The nares are poorly preserved but large, the orbits are rounded and bordered by a prominent process of the postorbital bone as seen in other dyrosaurs. In Arambourgisuchus the supratemporal fenestrae are very large and elongated, nearly three times longer than they are wide and only separated by a narrow interfenestral bar. The premaxilla is almost circular at the front of the skull and extends back to approximately the level of the third tooth of the maxilla, preventing the nasal bone from contacting the nares. The premaxilla likely contained four teeth. A small first tooth is followed by a small concavity (receiving the robust first mandibular tooth), in turn followed by the larger second and third tooth, the later of which appearing to be the largest based on a prominent gap in the toothrow of the mandible. Although the fourth tooth is not preserved, the absence of a large gap between the mandibular teeth suggests that it would have been small. The transition between premaxillary and maxillary teeth is marked by an enlarged toothless area (diastema) receiving an enlarged fourth dentary tooth. Estimates suggest that the maxillae each contained seventeen additional teeth, which are widely spaced up to the thirteenth tooth (at which point the distance between teeth decreases). The teeth of Arambourgisuchus are generally robust and sharp. The maxilla is long and narrow, making up the majority of the rostrum and gives the dyrosaur its longirostrine appearance. The nasal bone consists of a single fused bone with only very little ornamentation compared to the maxilla, which are laterally sculpted by deep ridges and furrows. Both the lacrimal and prefrontal bone are longer than they are wide and make up the majority of the anterior border of the orbits. Most of the frontal bone is located in the area between the orbits and the nasal, which it bifurcates. The frontal contributes very little to the interfenestral bar, but lightly overhangs the supratemporal fenestrae. Three ridges can be seen between the eyes, however aside from these the bone shows no ornamentation. The parietal contributes the vast majority of the interfenestral bar and shows a more developed overhang than the frontal. The back margin of the bone tapers and forms an acute process that overhangs the occipital condyle. The postorbital contacts the jugal to form the postorbital bar and the squamosal to form the lateral margin of the supratemporal fenestra.

Based on the skull length Arambourgisuchus was a large dyrosaur. It may be among the most longirostrine dyrosaurs, differing from Dyrosaurus phosphaticus by being more robust with fewer teeth. However, the teeth are sharper and more slender than those of the Eocene Phosphatosaurus.

== Phylogeny ==
Initial phylogenetic analysis were heavily restricted in terms of available taxa, only including species known from cranial material (and subsequently excluding Hyposaurus derbianus and Hyposaurus specimens from Mali). The resulting tree was consequently poorly resolved and while indicating a dispersal of the clade from Africa, did not match well with the stratigraphic range of the individual taxa.

- Dyrosauridae
  - Chenanisuchus
  - - - Phosphatosaurus
      - Sokotosuchus
    - - Dyrosaurus
      - - Hyposaurus rogersii
        - Arambourgisuchus khouribgaensis
        - Congosaurus
        - - Rhabdognathus rarus
          - Rhabdognathus sp.

Following more intensive research on dyrosaurids during the 2000s and 2010s, including the description of several additional taxa, Jouve and colleagues published a comprehensive phylogenetic analysis on the internal relationships of the family. In this analysis Arambourgisuchus was recovered as a hyposaurine dyrosaurid, most closely related to the two species of Dyrosaurus and the then newly described Luciasuchus from Bolivia.

- Dyrosauridae
  - Chenanisuchus lateroculi
  - - Anthracosuchus balrogus
    - - Cerrejonisuchus improcerus
      - - Phosphatosaurinae
          - Phosphatosaurus gavialoides
          - Sokotosuchus lanwilsoni
        - - Rodeosuchus machukirui
          - Hyposaurinae
            - Dorbignysuchus niatu
            - - - Arambourgisuchus khouribgaensis
                - Luciasuchus lurusinqa
                - - Dyrosaurus maghribensis
                  - Dyrosaurus phosphaticus
              - - Acherontisuchus guajirensis
                - - Atlantosuchus coupatezi
                  - - Rhabdognathus aslerensis
                    - - Congosaurus bequaerti
                      - Rhabdognathus keiniensis
