= Acherontisuchus =

Acherontisuchus Temporal range: Mid-Late Paleocene (Peligran-Itaboraian) ~60–58 Ma

Scientific classification
- Kingdom: Animalia
- Phylum: Chordata
- Class: Reptilia
- Clade: Archosauria
- Clade: Pseudosuchia
- Clade: Crocodylomorpha
- Family: †Dyrosauridae
- Genus: †Acherontisuchus; Hastings et al., 2011

Type species
- †A. guajiraensis Hastings et al., 2011

Extinct genus of reptiles

Acherontisuchus is an extinct genus of dyrosaurid neosuchian from Middle to Late Paleocene deposits of Colombia. The only known species is A. guajiraensis, whose name means "Acheron crocodile of the Guajira Peninsula".

== Description ==
Acherontisuchus is known from six specimens UF/IGM 34 through 39 (Hastings et al. 2011 noted these six specimens may represent only a single animal), including three partial lower jawbones, four fragments of the upper jaw, fragments of 21 teeth, two ribs, one upper backbone segment, one sacral vertebra (a bone that connects the hips to the rest of the spine), ribs that attach to the sacral vertebrae, a partial hip including the ilium and ischium bones, an upper leg bone, and one metatarsal foot bone. All Acherontisuchus specimens were collected from the Cerrejón Formation within the Cerrejón coal mine of northeastern Colombia and described in 2011 in Palaeontology journal by Alexander K. Hastings, Jonathan Bloch and Carlos A. Jaramillo. It is named after the river Acheron, which in Greek mythology was a branch of the river Styx meaning "river of woe" (Acherontisuchus is thought to have lived in a large river that emptied out into the Caribbean Sea during the Paleocene). The type species A. guajiraensis is named after Guajira Peninsula where Cerrejón is located.

Acherontisuchus is found in multiple layers between coal seams, giving it a wide time distribution throughout the formation. Another dyrosaurid called Cerrejonisuchus was named from Cerrejón in 2010, but is only found in one layer of the formation. Aside from the consistently fractured fossils, no evidence exists of an altered fossil size.

Acherontisuchus is considered a long-snouted, or longirostrine, dyrosaurid. Its snout is shorter than those of Dyrosaurus, Atlantosuchus, Rhabdognathus, and Congosaurus. Some of its teeth have pronounced grooves on both sides. The upper jaw is wide rather than high. Its head is estimated to have been 72–86 centimetres (28–34 in) long, about midsize for a dyrosaurid. It grew to a relatively large size compared to most dyrosaurids, between 4.66 and 6.46 metres (15.3 and 21.2 ft).

== Life history ==
Acherontisuchus lived in a calm, shallow, inland freshwater habitat in the tropical rainforests of northeastern Colombia, where its distant cousin Cerrejonisuchus lived as well. Most dyrosaurids, including the ancestors of Acherontisuchus, were well adapted to a coastal marine lifestyle. Like living crocodilians, these dyrosaurids were able to control their pitch and buoyancy in the water by contracting muscles that run between the abdomen and the hip. A projection of bone in the back of the hip called the ischial shaft serves as an anchor for the muscles that control pitch. Acherontisuchus has a slender ischial shaft, suggesting that the muscles that controlled its position in water were less developed. Oceanic dyrosaurids evolved an advanced system of pitch correction as an adaptation to rough ocean currents. Since Acherontisuchus lived in a shallow freshwater environment, it had less need to control its position.

Based on the shape of its ribs and limb bones, Acherontisuchus probably had strong muscles along its back and in its legs that enabled movement on land. It probably lived in rivers that were present far from the ocean. In these inland rivers, Acherontisuchus most likely fed on lungfishes and eels.

== Systematics ==
Acherontisuchus is closely related dyrosaurids from both Africa and the Americas. The phylogenetic analysis conducted with its first description placed Acherontisuchus in a derived clade of dyrosaurids that included Hyposaurus of North America, Congosaurus, Atlantosuchus, and Rhabdognathus of Africa, and Guarinisuchus of South America. The relationships between these dyrosaurids were not resolved, as Acherontisuchus was placed in a polytomy with Hyposaurus, Congosaurus, and a group containing the other close relatives. Acherontisuchus has several primitive features that distance it from other members of the derived dyrosaurid clade, including uniformly-spaced teeth and a wide connection between the two halves of the lower jaw. Below is a cladogram showing the phylogenetic relationships of Acherontisuchus and the distributions of dyrosaurids:

- Neosuchia
  - Sarcosuchus imperator
  - - Terminonaris robusta
    - - Elosuchus cherifiensis
      - Dyrosauridae
        - Chenanisuchus lateroculi
        - - Sokotosuchus ianwilsoni
          - - Phosphatosaurus gavialoides
            - - Cerrejonisuchus improcerus
              - - Arambourgisuchus khouribgaensis
                - - - Dyrosaurus phosphaticus
                    - Dyrosaurus maghribensis
                  - - Hyposaurus rogersii
                    - Acherontisuchus guajiraensis
                    - Congosaurus bequaerti
                    - - - Atlantosuchus
                        - Guarinisuchus
                      - - Rhabdognathus keiniensis
                        - Rhabdognathus aslerensis
