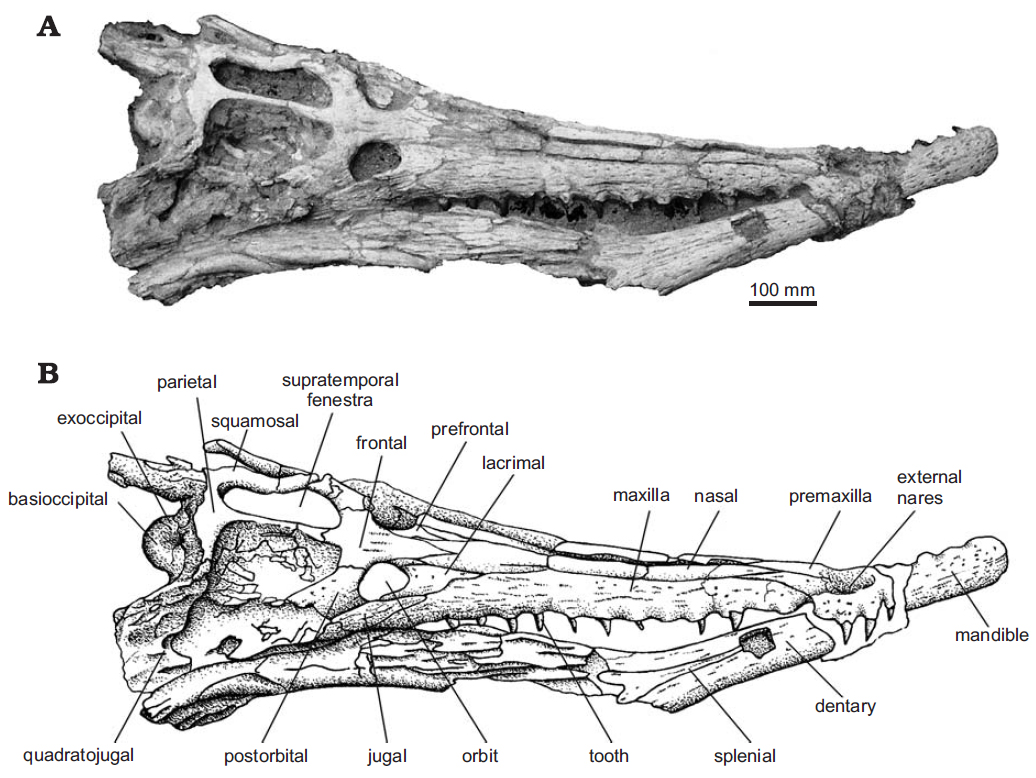
- Skull of the dyrosaurid Arambourgisuchus khouribgaensis
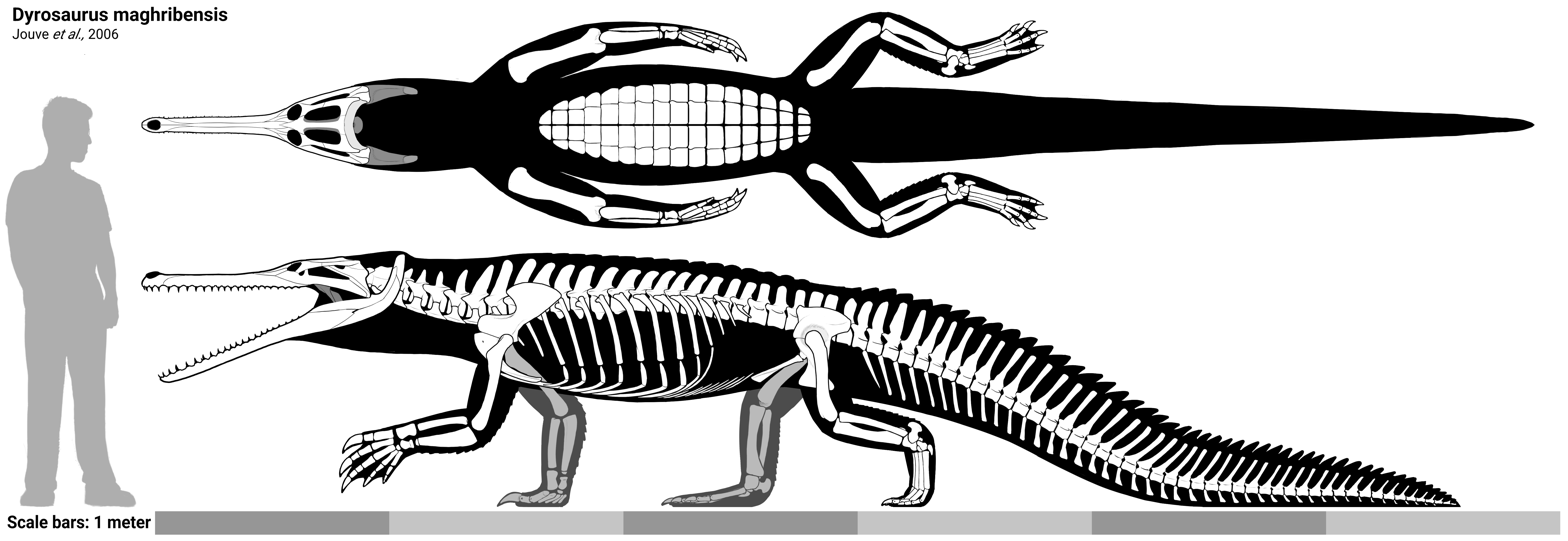
- Skeletal reconstruction of Dyrosaurus maghribensis

Scientific classification
- Kingdom: Animalia
- Phylum: Chordata
- Class: Reptilia
- Clade: Pseudosuchia
- Clade: Crocodylomorpha
- Suborder: †Tethysuchia
- Family: †Dyrosauridae de Stefano, 1903

Genera
- †Anthracosuchus; †Cerrejonisuchus; †Chenanisuchus; †Guarinisuchus; †Rodeosuchus; †Wadisuchus; †Phosphatosaurinae; †Phosphatosaurus; †Sokotosuchus; †Hyposaurinae; †Acherontisuchus; †Aigialosuchus; †Arambourgisuchus; †Atlantosuchus; †Brachiosuchus; †Congosaurus; †Dorbignysuchus; †Dyrosaurus; †Hyposaurus; †Luciasuchus; †Rhabdognathus; †Tilemsisuchus

= Dyrosauridae =

Dyrosauridae Temporal range: 83.5–47 Ma Campanian–Eocene

Extinct family of reptiles

Dyrosauridae is a family of extinct neosuchian crocodyliforms that lived from the Campanian to the Eocene. Dyrosaurid fossils are globally distributed, having been found in Africa, Asia, Europe, North America and South America. Over a dozen species are currently known, varying greatly in overall size and cranial shape, though typically with an elongate gharial-like snout. A majority were aquatic, some terrestrial and others fully marine with species inhabiting both freshwater and marine environments. Ocean-dwelling dyrosaurids were among the few marine reptiles to survive the Cretaceous–Paleogene extinction event.

Dyrosaurids were medium-to-large sized animals, with many of them reaching lengths past 6 metres (20 ft), Based on bone tissue evidence, it has been hypothesized that they were slow-growing near-shore marine animals with interlocking closed jaws, with a considerable ability to move the head upwards and downwards, able to swim as well as walk on land. External nostrils at the posterior end of its snout and an internal naris in its pterygoid indicated a habit of hunting while swimming with the top of the head above the water, enabling it to breathe while stalking prey.

== Overview ==
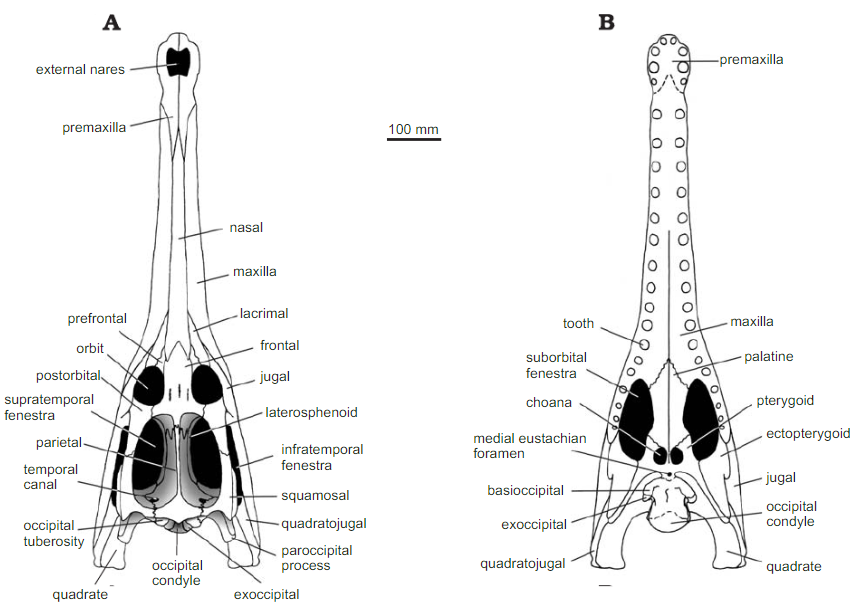
Labeled skull diagram of Arambourgisuchus

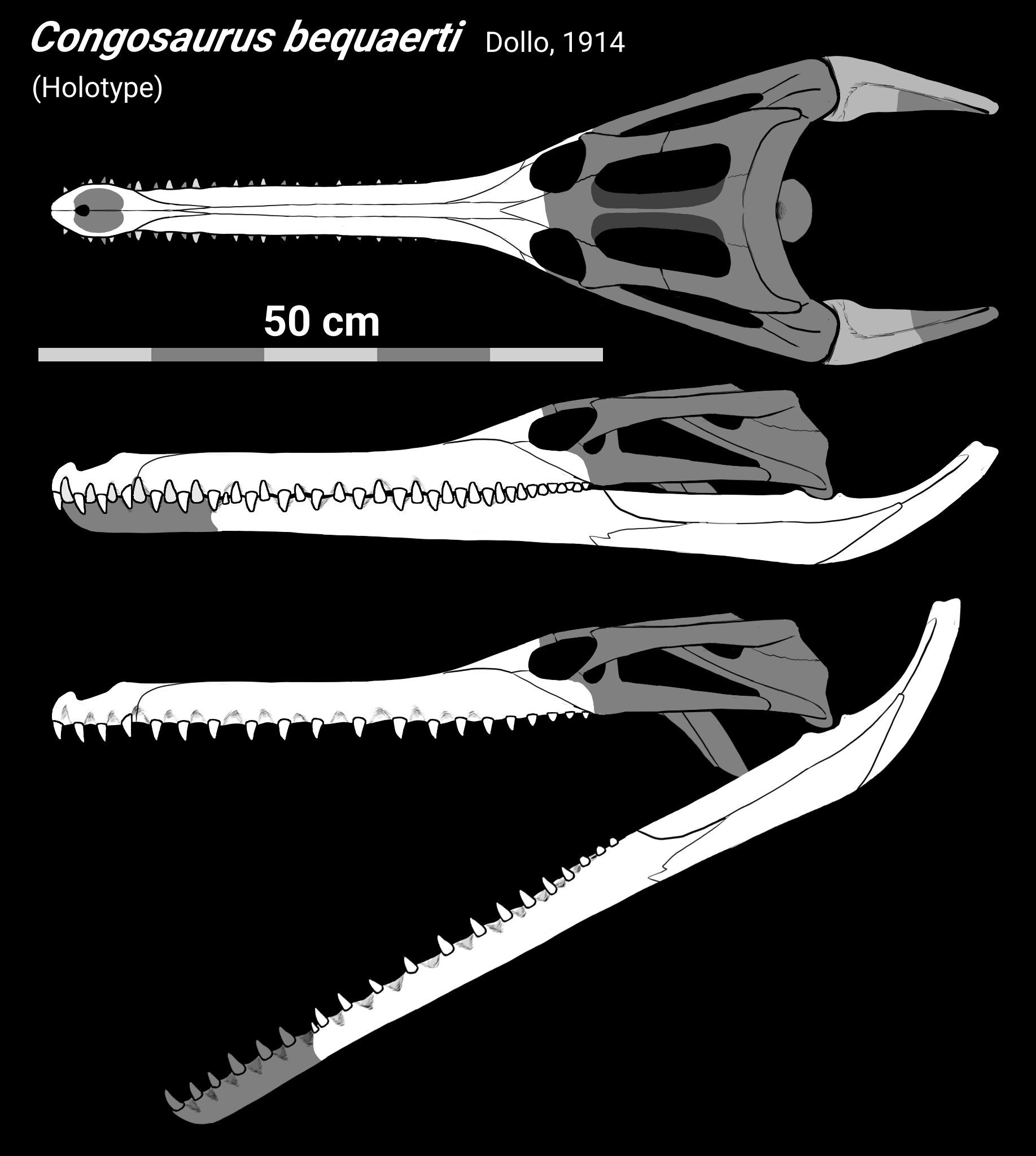
Skull and lower jaws of Congosaurus, note large upward curving retroarticular process at the back of the lower jaw

Jouve et al. (2005) diagnose Dyrosauridae as a clade based on the following seven synapomorphies or shared characters:

- Posteromedial wing of the retroarticular process dorsally situated ventrally on the retroarticular process
- Occipital tuberosities small
- Exoccipital participates largely to the occipital condyle
- Supratemporal fenestra anteroposteriorly strongly elongated
- Symphysis about as wide as high
- Quadratojugal participates largely to the cranial condyle for articulation with the jaw
- 4 premaxillary teeth

Dyrosaurids are known to have a very characteristic skull shape with a long and thin gharial-like snout that is approximately 68% of the total skull length. The most anterior part of the skull and snout is the external naris followed posteriorly by two premaxillae bones until they reach two maxillae bones separated by a single nasal bone. Dyrosaurus and Arambourgisuchus have the largest snout proportions of all dyrosaurids. Snout length was previously used it to establish dyrosaurid relationships, while considering the lengthening of the snout to be a 'more evolved' character. This was not congruent with Jouve's conclusion which was that the longest snout is actually the primitive condition so the shorter or longer snout appears independently at least four times in dyrosaurid evolution.

Typical in dyrosaurids is a single nasal element with a characteristic collection of small pits and a constant width until it widens to contact the lacrimal bones, then tapering off for a short distance until it meets the boundary of the frontals and prefrontals.

Dyrosaurs have a premaxilla with shallow pits that extend posterior to the third maxillary alveoli. There are two premaxillae that are narrow as compared to the maxillary bones and extend in the two long maxilla bones which separated by the single nasal bone. The last premaxilla and first maxilla are widely separated by a fourth dentary tooth. Alveoli are widely spaced anteriorly and the space between them decreases posteriorly from the fifteenth alveolus with the diameter remaining constant.

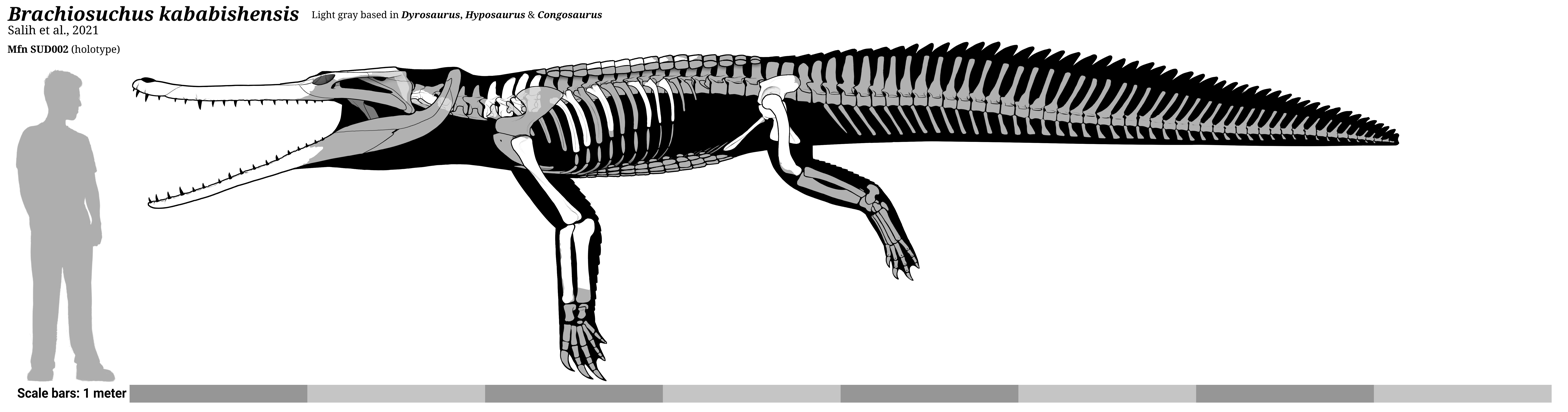
Skeletal reconstruction of Brachiosuchus kababishensis, a giant dyrosaurid, characteristic for its large arms.

The maxilla is long (approx. two and a half times the length of jugal) and forms most of the lateral margin of the skull. According to Jouve and Barbosa and perhaps depending on the age of the animal, each maxilla bears 13–19 teeth.

An important feature of the dyrosaurid dentition are deep occlusal pits, present particularly in the posterior region of the maxillae that get less pronounced anteriorly. The pits are indicative of an interlocking closed jaw for dyrosaurids because the pits give a way for the upper and lower jaws to alternate. Although they are still present in Dyrosaurus phosphaticus, this feature of deep occlusal pits become less developed and broad.

The posterior part of the lower jaw has an extremely elongate and upward curving retroarticular process.

== Palaeobiology ==
=== Growth ===
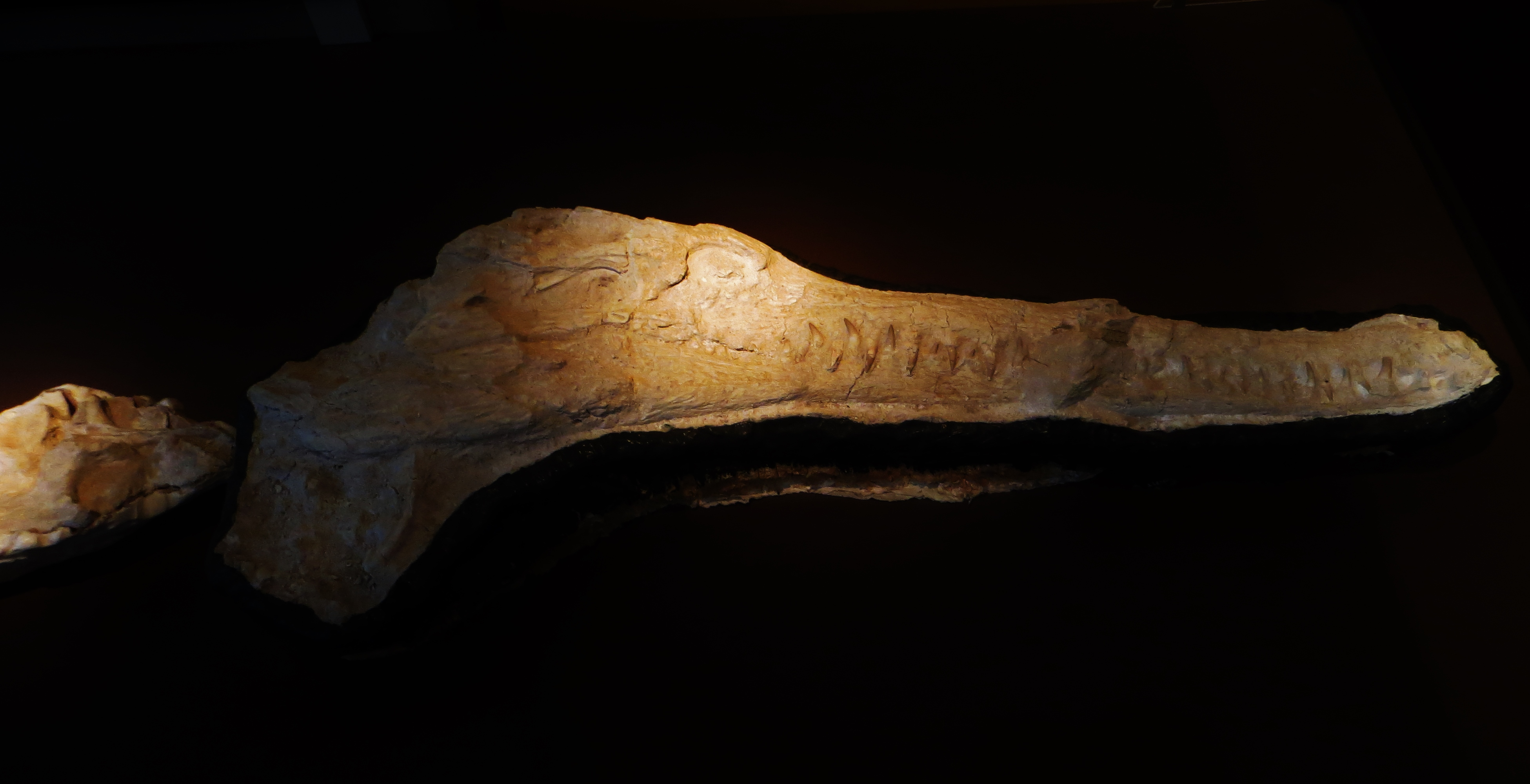
Skull

Evidence for the semi-aquatic life of dyrosaurids comes from careful analysis of bone structure. There are two types of structural bone organization that can occur in aquatic tetrapods: osteoporotic or pachyostotic. Osteoporotic bone is spongy and porous whereas pachyostotic involves an increase in skeletal mass. Spongy/porous bone such as osteoporotic is associated with faster swimming and better maneuverability in water because of the reduction in bone tissue, many extant cetaceans and marine turtles have osteoporotic bone which enables them to be good swimmers. Pachyostotic bone is a general/local increase in skeletal mass which can be caused by osteosclerosis (inner compaction of bone), pachyostosis (hyperplasy of compact cortices) or pachyeosclerosis (combination of the two). Research on dyrosaur bone performed by Rafael César Lima Pedroso de Andrade and Juliana Manso Sayao revealed that this family had osteoporotic bone tissue indicative of a fast-swimming ecology as well as some osteosclerosis which is a component of pachyostotic bone tissue. Osteoporosis is associated with a fully aquatic lifestyle whereas pachyostotic is not fully aquatic but is associated with fast swimming ecology. Therefore, dyrosaurs are semi-aquatic fast swimmers as indicated by their bone structure. Other evidence for near shore, semi-aquatic lifestyle is where the fossils are found, often in transitional marine sediments. -using axial frequency swimming (that used primarily by extant crocodylians) with a greater undulatory motion and frequency of the tail due to highly developed musculature allowing a more powerful forward thrust.

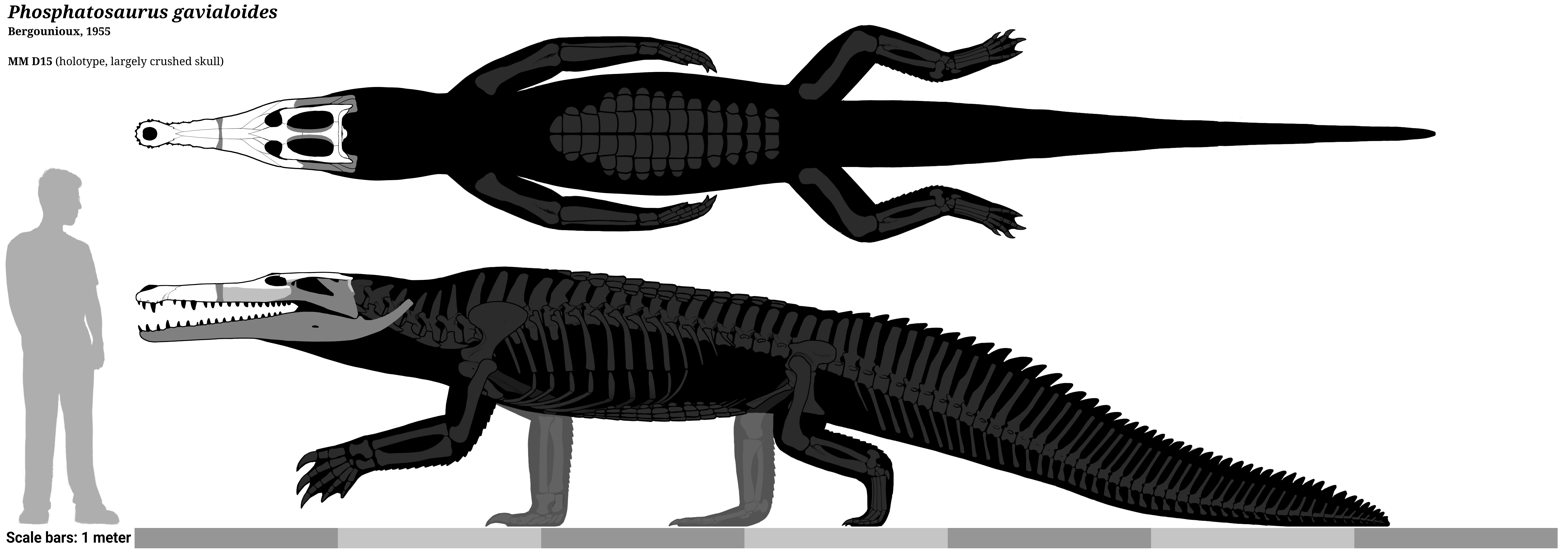
Phosphatosaurus gavialoides, a large member of the family with blunt teeth and a comparatively broader snout.

Dyrosaurids have a tissue pattern that is indicative of a slow-growth animal that was determined by careful analysis of a right femur and left tibia. In the left tibia, the cortex had a lamellar zonal bone with five lines of arrested growth (LAGs) which were spaced 300 mm apart, well as a clear vascular networks of primary osteons that decreased in density towards the membrane (periostially). The right femur had double LAGs and an EFS later as well as secondary osteons occurring in the deep cortex and the spongiosa. This tissue growth pattern is a common characteristic of slow growing animals.

=== Habitat ===
Dyrosaurids are found in transitional marine sediments from the Late Cretaceous to lower Eocene. This family is known mainly from Maastrichthian deposits in New Jersey and the late Cretaceous to early Paleogene rock from the Tethys Sea in northern and western Africa. Fossils have also been found from the Paleocene and Eocene strata of Pakistan, as well as South America, Brazil, India, Southern Asia as well as coastal. Generally dyrosaurids are recovered from coastal and estuarine deposits through North Africa and the Middle East confirming their existence as semi-aquatic animals.

Dyrosauridae had its greatest taxonomic diversity during the Early Paleogene but it appears as though the clade was able to obtain a greater and more widespread geographic distribution during the Late Cretaceous. The earliest records of dyrosaurids are either in or close to Africa with fragmentary occurrences from the Cenomanian of Sudan and Portugal and several other pre-Maastrichtian, Late Cretaceous discoveries in Egypt. Later, by the Maastrichtian of North America, the record of dyrosaurids became more complete by establishing a widespread distribution that appears to be maintained through the Paleocene and Eocene.

Dyrosaurids have also been found from non-marine sediments. In northern Sudan, dyrosaurids are known from fluvial deposits, indicating that they lived in a river setting. Bones from indeterminate dyrosaurids have been found in inland deposits in Pakistan as well. Some dyrosaurids, such as those from the Umm Himar Formation in Saudi Arabia, inhabited estuarine environments near the coast. The recently named dyrosaurids Cerrejonisuchus and Acherontisuchus have been recovered from the Cerrejón Formation in northwestern Colombia, which is thought to represent a transitional marine-freshwater environment surrounded by rainforest more inland than the estuarine environment of the Umm Himar Formation. Cerrejonisuchus and Acherontisuchus lived in a neotropical setting during a time when global temperatures were much warmer than they are today.

A study on Cerrejonisuchus suggest this genus was more terrestrial than other dyrosaurids, and also shows that modern crocodylians are not good functional analogues for Dyrosauridae.

=== Diet and head movement ===
Dyrosaurs are thought to have been extremely well adapted to moving the head and neck vertically upwards and downwards relative to the body, while only having a moderate though still considerable ability to move side-to-side (laterally). Dyrosaurs likely had a varied ecology, swiping the head side to side to snatch fish, as well as probing the sediment with their snout and bottom feeding. They likely primarily consumed soft prey, thin shelled prey such as crustaceans and the soft parts of hard shelled prey. Phosphatosaurus may have been able to take harder shelled prey than other dyrosaurids due to its blunt teeth. Their elongated snouts meant that they could only take relatively small prey, up to around 20 kilograms (44 lb), with prey on the smaller side of this spectrum likely being swallowed whole.

=== Reproduction ===
In 1978, it was proposed that dyrosaurids lived as adults in the ocean but reproduced in inland freshwater environments. Remains belonging to small-bodied dyrosaurids from Pakistan were interpreted as juveniles. Their presence in inland deposits was viewed as evidence that dyrosaurids hatched far from the ocean. From the lower Eocene Oulad Abdoun Basin, there are very few juvenile dyrosaurids, but numerous similarly-sized adult specimens. This has furthered the assumption that juveniles lived in freshwater environments and adults lived in marine environments. Recently however, the large-bodied and fully mature dyrosaurids of the Cerrejón Formation have shown that some dyrosaurids lived their entire lives in inland environments, never returning to the coast.

== Genera ==
Genus	Status	Age	Location	Description	Images
Acherontisuchus	Valid	Paleocene	Colombia	A large-bodied, long-snouted freshwater dyrosaurid from the Cerrejón Formation	
Aigialosuchus	Valid	Campanian	Sweden	A marine dyrosaurid from the Kristianstad Basin	
Anthracosuchus	Valid	Paleocene	Colombia	A short-snouted freshwater dyrosaurid from the Cerrejón Formation	
Arambourgisuchus	Valid	Paleocene	Morocco	A long-snouted marine dyrosaurid	
Atlantosuchus	Valid	Paleocene	Morocco	A long-snouted marine dyrosaurid with the longest snout length in proportion to body size of any dyrosaurid	
Brachiosuchus	Valid	Late Cretaceous	Sudan	A large, long-snouted dyrosaurid with the longest known arms of the group	
Cerrejonisuchus	Valid	Paleocene	Colombia	A small-bodied, short-snouted freshwater dyrosaurid from the Cerrejón Formation	
Chenanisuchus	Valid	Maastrichtian–Paleocene	Mali; Morocco	The genus spans the K–Pg boundary	
Congosaurus	Valid	Paleocene	Angola	Known from very complete remains, previously thought to be a synonym of Hyposaurus	
Dyrosaurus	Valid	Eocene	Algeria; Tunisia	A large-bodied, long-snouted marine dyrosaurid	
Guarinisuchus	Valid	Paleocene	Brazil	probable Junior synonym of Hyposaurus derbianus	
Luciasuchus	Valid	Paleocene	Bolivia	Large dyrosaurid known from a partial snout	
Hyposaurus	Valid	Maastrichtian–Paleocene	Brazil; Mali; Nigeria; US	Five species have been named, the most of any dyrosaurid genus; the genus spans the K–Pg boundary	
Phosphatosaurus	Valid	Eocene	Mali; Tunisia	A large-bodied, long-snouted marine dyrosaurid with blunt teeth and a spoon-shaped snout tip	
Rhabdognathus	Valid	Maastrichtian–Paleogene	Mali; Nigeria	A large-bodied, long-snouted marine dyrosaurid; the genus spans the K–Pg boundary	
Sokotosaurus	Junior synonym			Junior synonym of Hyposaurus	
Sokotosuchus	Valid	Maastrichtian	Nigeria	A long-snouted marine dyrosaurid	
Tilemsisuchus	Valid	Eocene	Mali		

== Phylogeny ==
Jouve et al. 2020 provide a comprehensive analysis of the relationships of dyrosaurids, shown below. Note the former dyrosaurids Sabinosuchus and Fortignathus are recovered as a pholidosaurid and a peirosaurid, respectively.

- Dyrosauridae
  - Chenanisuchus lateroculi
  - - Anthracosuchus balrogus
    - - Cerrejonisuchus improcerus
      - - Phosphatosaurinae
          - Phosphatosaurus gavialoides
          - Sokotosuchus ianwilsoni
        - - Rodeosuchus machukiru
          - Hyposaurinae
            - Dorbignysuchus niatu
            - - - Arambourgisuchus khouribgaensis
                - Luciasuchus lurusinqa
                - - Dyrosaurus maghribensis
                  - Dyrosaurus phosphaticus
              - - Acherontisuchus guajiraensis
                - - Atlantosuchus coupatezi
                  - - Rhabdognathus aslerensis
                    - - Congosaurus bequaerti
                      - Rhabdognathus keiniensis
