= Tilemsisuchus =

Tilemsisuchus Temporal range: Eocene

Scientific classification
- Domain: Eukaryota
- Kingdom: Animalia
- Phylum: Chordata
- Class: Reptilia
- Clade: Archosauria
- Clade: Pseudosuchia
- Clade: Crocodylomorpha
- Clade: Crocodyliformes
- Family: †Dyrosauridae
- Genus: †Tilemsisuchus; Buffetaut, 1979

Type species
- †Tilemsisuchus lavocati Buffetaut, 1979

Extinct genus of reptiles

Tilemsisuchus is an extinct genus of dyrosaurid crocodyliform which existed in what is now Mali during the Eocene period. It was first named by Eric Buffetaut in 1979 and contains the species Tilemsisuchus lavocati.
