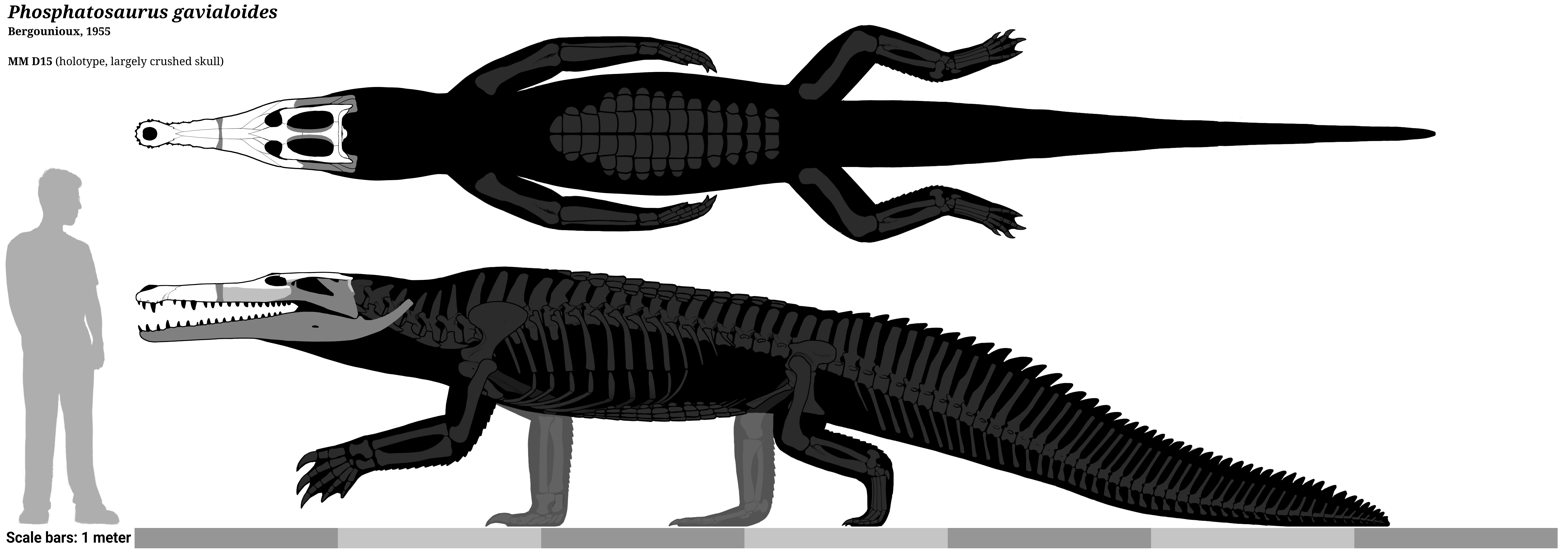
- Size comparison

Scientific classification
- Kingdom: Animalia
- Phylum: Chordata
- Class: Reptilia
- Clade: Pseudosuchia
- Clade: Crocodylomorpha
- Family: †Dyrosauridae
- Genus: †Phosphatosaurus; Bergounioux, 1955

Species
- †P. gavialoides Bergounioux, 1955 (type)

= Phosphatosaurus =

Phosphatosaurus Temporal range: Early Eocene, 48.6 Ma (ghost lineage extends from Maastrichtian)

Extinct genus of reptiles

Phosphatosaurus is an extinct genus of dyrosaurid crocodylomorph. It existed during the early Eocene, with fossils having been found from North Africa in Tunisia and Mali. Named in 1955, Phosphatosaurus is a monotypic genus; the type species is P. gavialoides. A specimen has been discovered from Niger, but it cannot be classified at the species level.

Phosphatosaurus is closely related to the Cretaceous genus Sokotosuchus, which is known from Niger and Mali. Because Phosphatosaurus is only known from Paleogene localities, the close relationship with Sokotosuchus implies that there is a long ghost lineage extending back into the Maastrichtian that is not known in the fossil record.

== Description ==
Phosphatosaurus is a large dyrosaurid (skull of more than 1 metre (3.3 ft) in length) with blunt teeth. The tip of the snout is spoon-shaped from a lateral expansion of the rostral portion of the mandible. The dentition is nonhomodont. Alveolar "couplets" are present in the lower jaw of Phosphatosaurus in which paired tooth sockets, or alveoli, are closer to one another than to the alveoli next to them. This is not seen in any other dyrosaurid but is seen in some other longirostrine (long snouted) crocodylomorphs such as the gavialoid Eosuchus. It is possible that the diastemata between the couplets served to receive larger maxillary teeth.

== Classification ==
Phosphatosaurus was assigned in 1979 to the newly named subfamily Phosphatosaurinae by Eric Buffetaut, who considered the subfamily to be the clade formed by Phosphatosaurus and the closely related Sokotosaurus. However, other authors of more recent studies have been tentative in considering the taxon valid because there is currently little knowledge of the anatomy of either genus.

=== Phylogenetics ===
Phylogenetic position of Phosphatosaurus

Buffetaut 1978

- Dyrosauridae
  - Phosphatosaurus
  - - Rhabdognathus
    - - Hyposaurus
      - Dyrosaurus

Jouve 2005

- Dyrosauridae
  - Sokotosuchus
  - Phosphatosaurus
  - - Dyrosaurus
    - - Hyposaurus
      - Rhabdognathus

Jouve et al. 2005

- Dyrosauridae
  - Chenanisuchus
  - - - Sokotosuchus
      - Phosphatosaurus
    - - Dyrosaurus
      - - Arambourgisuchus
        - Congosaurus
        - Hyposaurus
        - Rhabdognathus

Phosphatosaurus is considered to be a basal dyrosaurid, and is often positioned near the base of phylogenetic trees of dyrosaurids. An early phylogenetic analysis by Buffetaut (1978), not based on a cladistic data matrix, puts Phosphatosaurus at the base of the tree due to the presence of many primitive characters in the genus. Later phylogenetic analyses, such as the one by Jouve (2005), have also shown Phosphatosaurus to be a basal member of the family. In most analyses, Phosphatosaurus and Sokotosuchus form a clade. These two genera are more closely related to one another than to any other genus of dyrosaurid. More recent phylogenetic studies have considered Chenanisuchus, a short-snouted dyrosairid named in 2005, to be even more basal than the clade containing Phosphatosaurus and Sokotosuchus.
