= Peligran =

Period of geologic time

The Peligran (Spanish: Peligrense) age is a period of geologic time within the Paleocene epoch of the Paleogene, used more specifically with South American land mammal ages (SALMA). It may follow the Tiupampan and precede the Itaboraian or Riochican ages, though the exact sequence of Paleocene-Eocene SALMAs is still debated. Radiometric dating of the upper Salamanca Formation suggests that the Peligran occupies an interval from about 63.8 to 63.2 million years ago, which is several million years older than previous estimates.

== Etymology ==
The age is named after the paleontological site Punta Peligro in Argentina.

== Formations ==
Locations of Peligran formations

| Formation bold is type | Country | Basin | Notes |
|---|---|---|---|
| Salamanca Formation | Argentina | Golfo San Jorge Basin | |
| Bogotá Formation | Colombia | Altiplano Cundiboyacense | |
| Cerrejón Formation | Colombia | Cesar-Ranchería Basin | |
| Chota Formation | Peru | Bagua Basin | |
| Guaduas Formation | Colombia | Altiplano Cundiboyacense | |
| Peñas Coloradas Formation | Argentina | Golfo San Jorge Basin | |
| Santa Lucía Formation | Bolivia | Potosí Basin | |

== Fossils ==
| Group | Fossils | Formation | Notes |
|---|---|---|---|
| Mammals | Amphidolops yapa, Carodnia feruglioi, Notoetayoa gargantuai, Wainka tshotshe, Borhyaenidae indet., Eutheria indet. | Peñas; Coloradas | |
| Mammals | Derorhynchus aff. minutus, Escribania chubutensis, Escribania talonicuspis, Monotrematum sudamericanum, Peligrotherium tropicalis, Raulvaccia peligrensis, Requisia vidmari, Sudamerica ameghinoi, Didelphopsis sp., Polydolopimorphia sp., Bonapartheriidae, Metatheria indet., Placentalia indet., cf. Sparassodonta indet. | Salamanca | |
| Reptiles & amphibians | aff. Allognathosuchus sp., Hydromedusa cf. casamayorensis, Kawasphenodon peligrensis, Naiadochelys cf. patagonica, Necrosuchus ionensis, Peligrochelys walshae, Yaminuechelys maior, Caimaninae indet., Leptodactylidae indet., ?Pipidae indet. | Salamanca | |
| Reptiles & amphibians | Acherontisuchus guajiraensis, Anthracosuchus balrogus, Carbonemys cofrinii, Cerrejonemys wayuunaiki, Cerrejonisuchus improcerus, Pelomedusoides sp., Puentemys mushaisaensis, Titanoboa cerrejonensis | Cerrejón | |
| Reptiles & amphibians | Crocodylia sp. | Peñas; Coloradas | |
| Fishes | Dipnoi sp., Elopomorpha sp. | Cerrejón | |
| Flora | Menispina evidens | Bogotá | |
