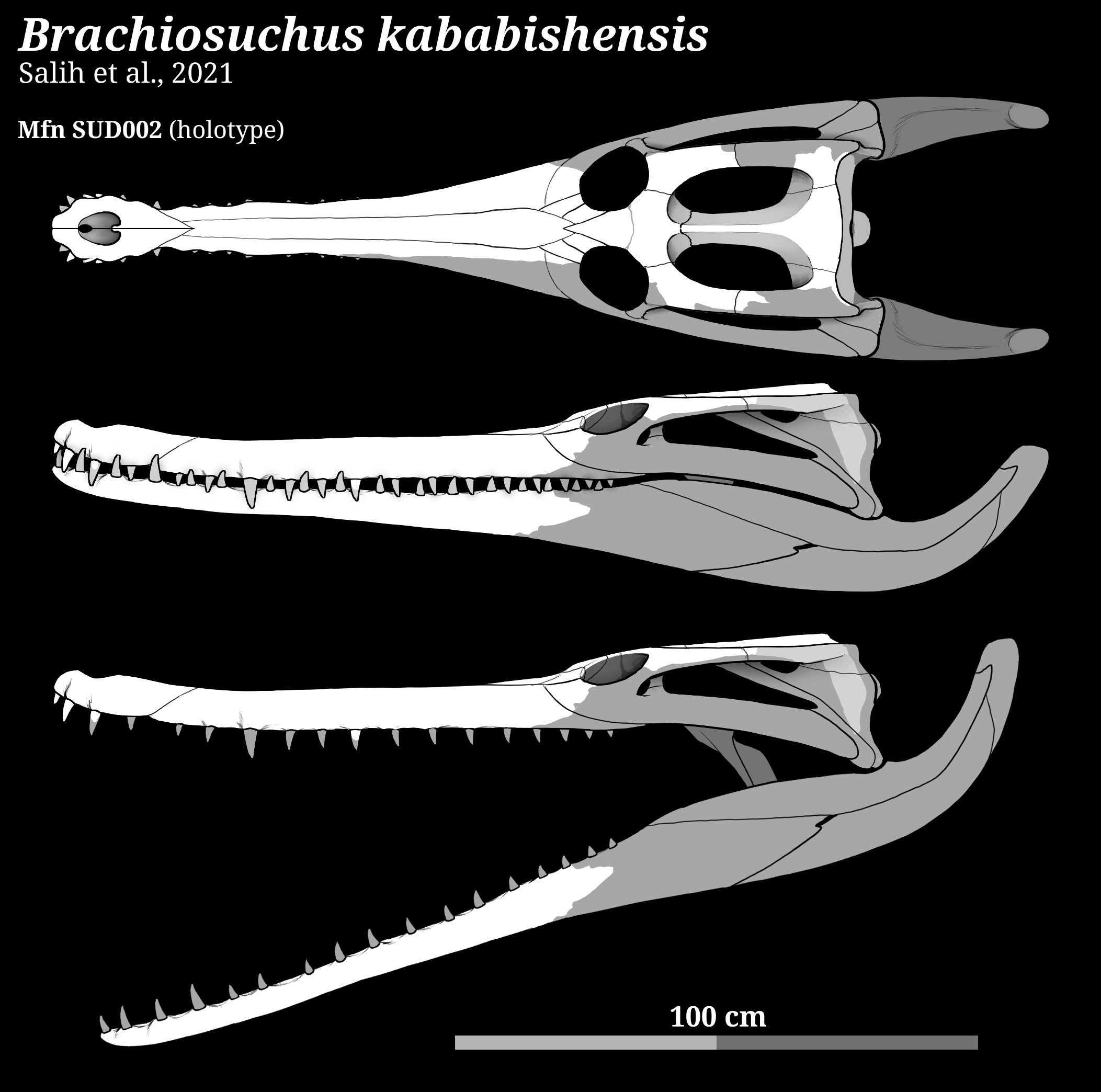
- Reconstruction of the holotype skull

Scientific classification
- Kingdom: Animalia
- Phylum: Chordata
- Class: Reptilia
- Clade: Archosauria
- Clade: Pseudosuchia
- Clade: Crocodylomorpha
- Family: †Dyrosauridae
- Genus: †Brachiosuchus; Salih et al., 2021
- Species: †B. kababishensis

Binomial name
- †Brachiosuchus kababishensis Salih et al., 2021

= Brachiosuchus =

Brachiosuchus Temporal range: Late Cretaceous, Campanian–Maastrichtian

Extinct genus of reptiles

Brachiosuchus is an extinct genus of dyrosaurid crocodyliform known from the Late Cretaceous Kababish Formation of Sudan. It contains a single species, Brachiosuchus kababishensis.

== Discovery and Naming ==
The fossils of Brachiosuchus were first discovered in 2012 in the Kababish Formation near Jebel Abyad, northern Sudan, which had previously yielded no fossils of macrovertebrates. The remains were uncovered by the members of an international collaborative project focusing on the Cretaceous of north Sudan and are currently housed in the Naturkundemuseum Berlin until the creation of paleontological collection facilities and curation in Sudan. Brachiosuchus is known from cranial and postcranial material of a single individual, given the specimen numbers MfN SUD001 to MfN SUD012.

The name Brachiosuchus derives from the ancient Greek brachion (βραχίων) meaning "arm" (in reference to the animals enlarged forelimbs) and soukhos (σοῦχος) meaning "crocodile". The species epithet kababishensis refers to the Kababish Formation, where the type material has been found.

== Description ==
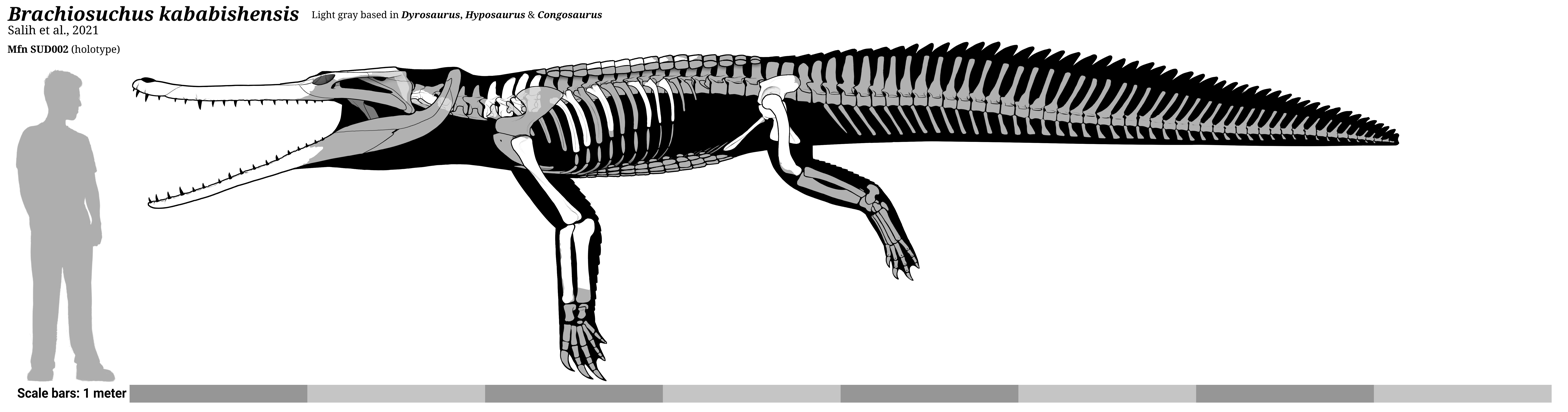
Skeletal reconstruction and size comparison of the holotype

Brachiosuchus is known from an almost complete skull; missing the jugal, squamosal, quadrate and quadratojugal bones; an incomplete mandible missing the posterior portion, multiple cervical vertebrae, dorsal ribs, a complete humerus as well as incomplete ulna and radius, the left pubis, ischium and ilium, a right femur and multiple complete and fragmentary osteoderms. Brachiosuchus is characterized by its elongated supratemporal fenestrae, occipital tuberosities, a reduced 7th alveolus of the mandible and a wedge-shaped humerus longer than its femur.

The skull is approximately 1.50 meters long and longirostrine in shape, the snout making up 67% of the total skull length. The mandibular symphysis is wider than high, ending at the 13th tooth. There are 16 alveoli on the upper jaw, the nasal bones are fused and do not penetrate the premaxilla, which entirely encases the heart shaped nares. Instead the nasal is anteriorly penetrated by the premaxilla and posteriorly by the roughly cross shaped frontal. The supratemporal fenestrae are longer than wide and the interfenestral bar is dorsally very narrow, forming a sagittal crest.

Seven partially articulate cervical ribs are preserved, from the atlas-axis-complex to cervical 9, missing the 4th and 5th vertebrae. The C3 is badly preserved, while C6-C8 are preserved in articulation. The neural arch is present from the 6th cervical onwards, but the neural spine is broken in C6. Five detached but complete dorsal ribs were found alongside 1 partial rib. The humerus is 58 cm long and wedge shaped, the proximal head of it wider than its distal end. The femur is smaller, 48 cm in length and displaying the typical dyrosaurid condition. The forelimbs being longer than the hindlimbs is unique amongst dyrosaurids and even crocodylomorphs as a whole. Finally, Brachiosuchus preserves 4 complete but disarticulate osteoderms together with several fragmentary osteoderms. They are thin, slightly domed and ornamented on their external surface with several deep, subrounded pits. The osteoderms are rectangular in shape, however some of the fragmentary fossils are irregular in shape, possibly identifying them as paravertebral osteoderms. Body size estimates suggest a possible length of around 7 meters.

== Paleobiology ==
The Kababish Formation is dated to the Campanian - Maastrichtian and is characterised by fine-grained sandstones, siltstones and mudstone sediments of nearshore to backshore, tidal flats and lagoons. This could potentially extend the range of dyrosaurids into the Campanian and, along with Brachiosuchus basal position within dyrosauridae supports a dispersal of the group from Africa.

The enlarged forearms are a unique adaptation amongst crocodyliforms, drawing parallels to sauropterygians, plesiosaurs and sea turtles. However Brachiosuchus does not preserve paddle like forelimbs like the aforementioned groups. The limb proportions suggest that Brachiosuchus may have been a highly efficient and manoeuvrable underwater predator, possibly specialised in different prey than its relatives with more typical limb proportions. The forelimbs would have been of greater importance in locomotion, while the less specialised hindlimbs may have been used as stabilizers.
