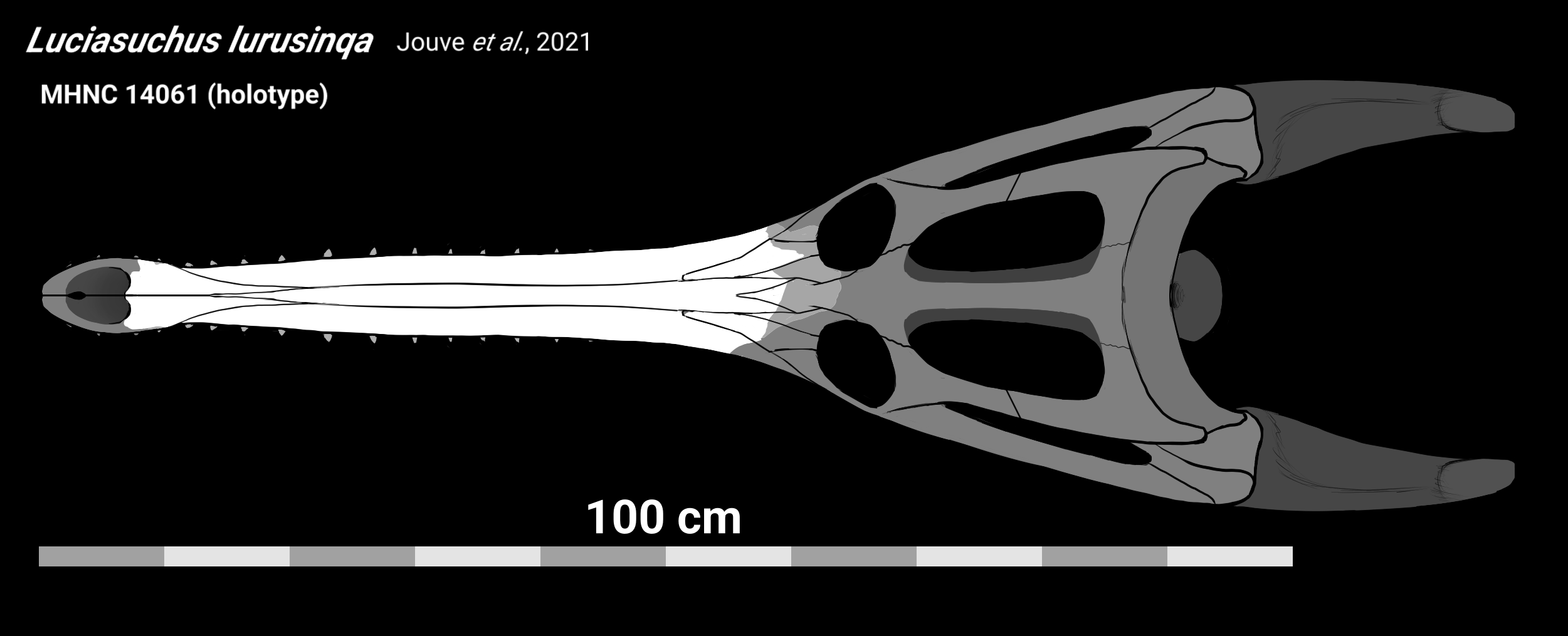
- Skull diagram in dorsal view showcasing known material in white

Scientific classification
- Kingdom: Animalia
- Phylum: Chordata
- Class: Reptilia
- Clade: Archosauria
- Clade: Pseudosuchia
- Clade: Crocodylomorpha
- Family: †Dyrosauridae
- Genus: †Luciasuchus; Jouve et al., 2021
- Species: †L. lurusinqa

Binomial name
- †Luciasuchus lurusinqa Jouve et al., 2021

= Luciasuchus =

Luciasuchus Temporal range: Paleocene

Extinct genus of crocodylians

Luciasuchus is an extinct genus of dyrosaurid crocodyliform known from the Paleocene Santa Lucía Formation of Bolivia. It contains a single species, Luciasuchus lurusinqa.
