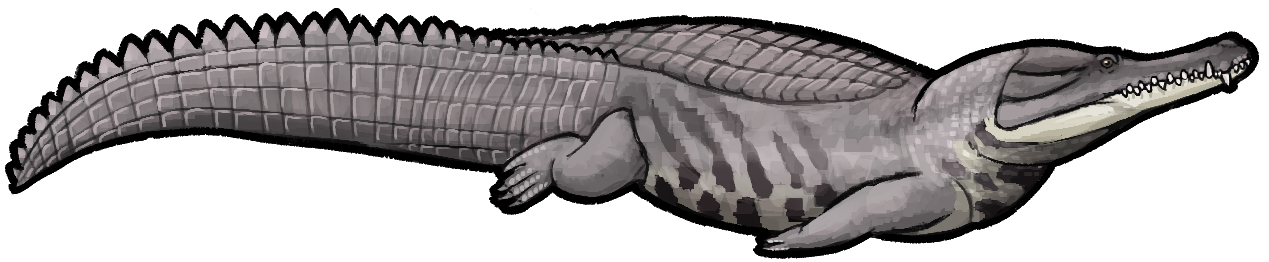

Scientific classification
- Domain: Eukaryota
- Kingdom: Animalia
- Phylum: Chordata
- Class: Reptilia
- Clade: Archosauria
- Clade: Pseudosuchia
- Clade: Crocodylomorpha
- Family: †Dyrosauridae
- Genus: †Rodeosuchus; Jouve et al., 2021
- Species: †R. machukiru

Binomial name
- †Rodeosuchus machukiru Jouve et al., 2021

= Rodeosuchus =

Rodeosuchus Temporal range: Paleocene

Extinct genus of crocodylians

Rodeosuchus is an extinct genus of dyrosaurid crocodyliform known from the Paleocene Santa Lucía Formation of Bolivia. It contains a single species, Rodeosuchus machukiru.
