= Dorbignysuchus =

Dorbignysuchus Temporal range: Paleocene

Scientific classification
- Domain: Eukaryota
- Kingdom: Animalia
- Phylum: Chordata
- Class: Reptilia
- Clade: Archosauria
- Clade: Pseudosuchia
- Clade: Crocodylomorpha
- Family: †Dyrosauridae
- Genus: †Dorbignysuchus; Jouve et al., 2021
- Species: †D. niatu

Binomial name
- †Dorbignysuchus niatu Jouve et al., 2021

Extinct genus of crocydilians

Dorbignysuchus is an extinct genus of dyrosaurid crocodyliform known from the Paleocene Santa Lucía Formation of Bolivia. It contains a single species, Dorbignysuchus niatu.
