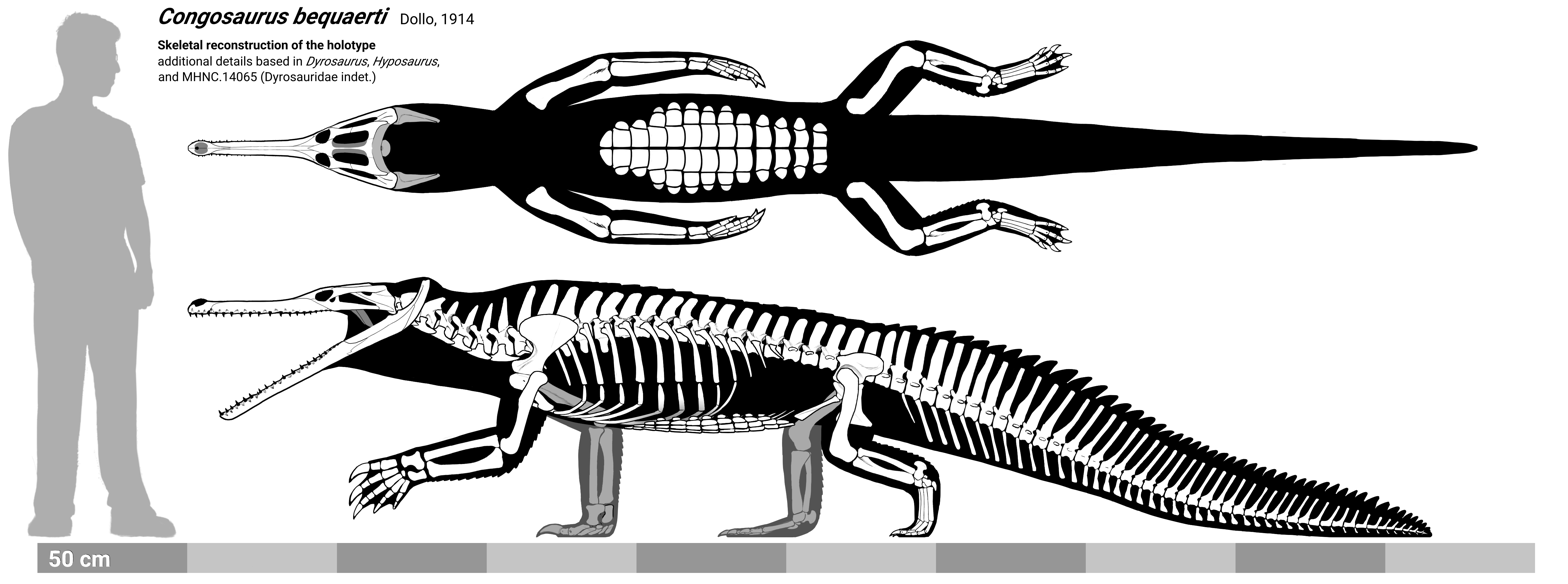
- Skeletal reconstruction of the holotype
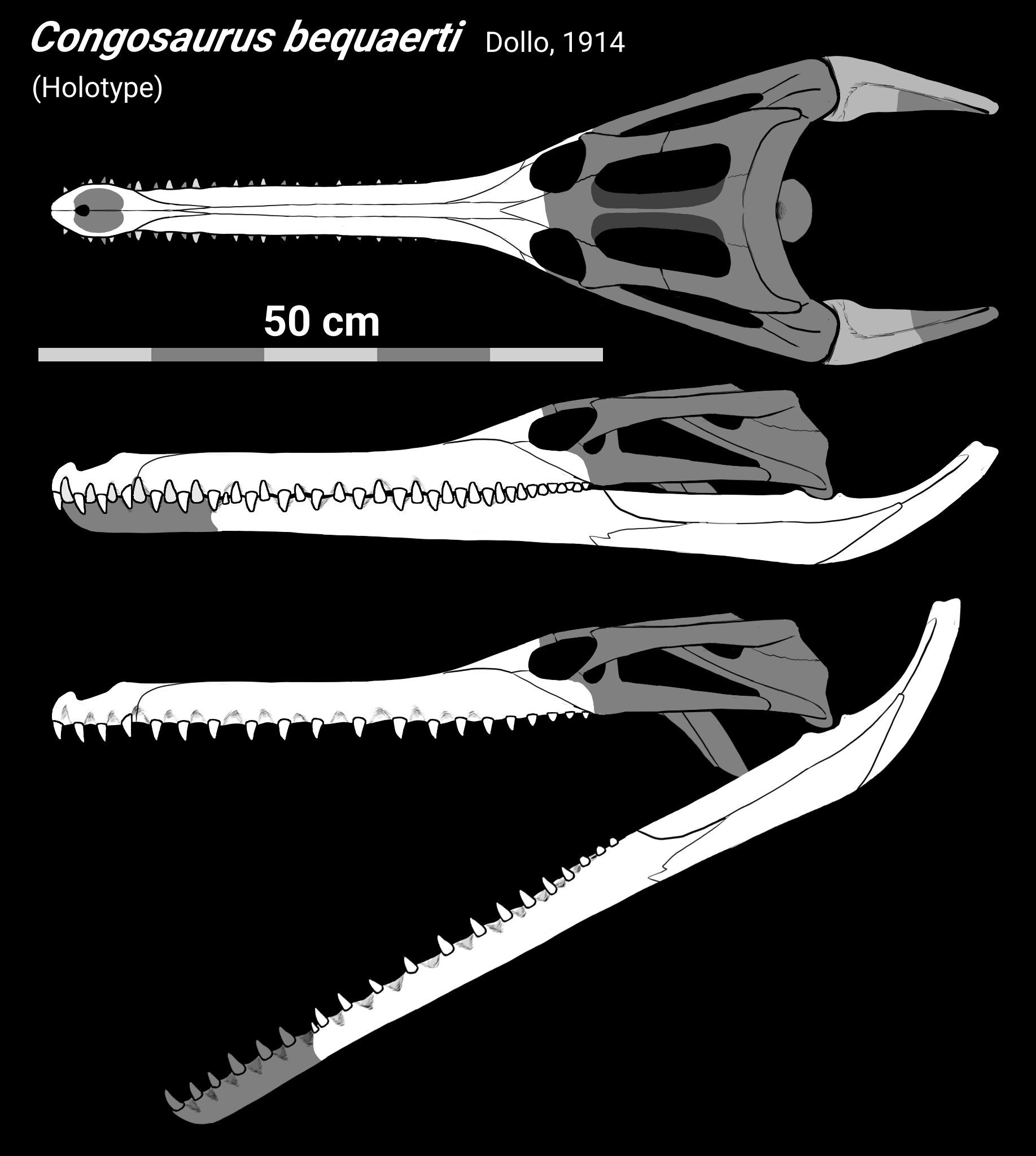
- Skull diagram

Scientific classification
- Kingdom: Animalia
- Phylum: Chordata
- Class: Reptilia
- Clade: Pseudosuchia
- Clade: Crocodylomorpha
- Family: †Dyrosauridae
- Genus: †Congosaurus; Dollo, 1914

Species
- †C. bequaerti Dollo, 1914 (type); †C. compressus (Buffetaut, 1980 [originally Rhabdognathus compressus])

= Congosaurus =

Congosaurus Temporal range: Paleocene

Extinct genus of reptiles

Congosaurus is an extinct genus of dyrosaurid mesoeucrocodylian. Fossils have been found from Lândana, in Angola and date back to the Paleocene epoch. In 1952 and 1964 Congosaurus was proposed to be synonymous with Dyrosaurus. The genus was later thought synonymous with Hyposaurus in 1976 and 1980. It has since been proven a distinct genus of dyrosaurid separate from both Dyrosaurus and Hyposaurus.

In 2007, a new species of Congosaurus was constructed after previously being assigned to Rhabdognathus, and named C. compressus, extending the geographic range of the genus into the present-day Sahara. Lateromedially compressed teeth show its close relation to C. bequaerti. A potential third, but indeterminate species of Congosaurus has been reported from Eocene-aged Cambay Shale Formation of Gujarat, India.
