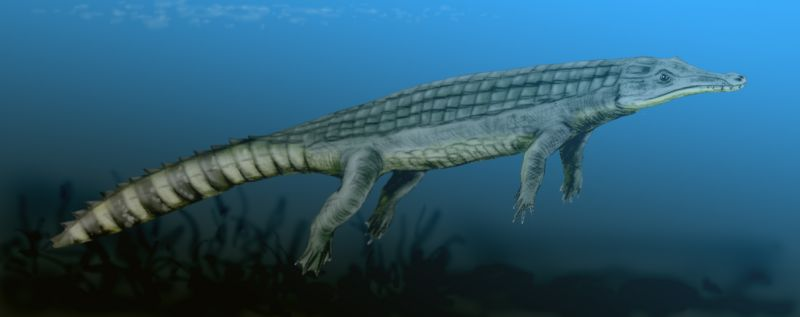
- Life restoration of Chenanisuchus lateroculi

Scientific classification
- Domain: Eukaryota
- Kingdom: Animalia
- Phylum: Chordata
- Class: Reptilia
- Clade: Archosauria
- Clade: Pseudosuchia
- Clade: Crocodylomorpha
- Clade: Crocodyliformes
- Family: †Dyrosauridae
- Genus: †Chenanisuchus; Jouve et al., 2005

Type species
- †Chenanisuchus lateroculi Jouve et al. 2005

= Chenanisuchus =

Chenanisuchus Temporal range: Late Cretaceous (Maastrichtian) - Paleocene

Extinct genus of reptiles

Chenanisuchus ("Chenane crocodile") is a genus of dyrosaurid crocodyliform from the Late Cretaceous of Mali and the Late Palaeocene of Sidi Chenane in Morocco. It was described in 2005, after expeditions uncovered it in 2000.

The type species is C. lateroculi ("lateralis", lateral; "oculi", eyes), in reference to the laterally facing eyes.

Currently, Chenanisuchus is the most basal known dyrosaurid.

== Material ==
Two specimens of C. lateroculi – OCP DEK-GE 262 (holotype, nearly complete skull with mandibular fragments) and OCP DEK-GE 61 (nearly complete skull) – come from the Sidi Chenane area in Morocco, which is Late Palaeocene (Thanetian) in age. Fossils of Chenanisuchus were also found in Maastrichtian age strata in Mali, showing that Chenanisuchus survived the Cretaceous–Paleogene extinction event.

== Systematics ==
Chenanisuchus lateroculi is referred to Dyrosauridae by Jouve et al. (2005), based on three morphological characters:

- Presence of occipital tuberosities
- Presence of an anterolateral postorbital process
- Large participation of the quadratojugal and surangular to the jaw joint

== Palaeobiology ==
Chenanisuchus lateroculi has an estimated adult length between 4 and 4.5 meters, based on the 60 centimeter long skull. It has the shortest snout relative to the dorsal skull length among all dyrosaurids, but its snout is thicker and its skull less slender than in dyrosaurids such as Sokotosuchus. There appear to be 4 teeth on each premaxilla, with an estimated 13 on each maxilla. The teeth on the maxillae and dentaries are short and robust, but sharp.

Studies of the inner ear morphology of Malian dyrosaurids suggest that they were adapted for walking on the sea floor as opposed to swimming, a hypothesis supported by the apparent lack of adaptations for swimming seen in other marine crocodyliforms (e.g. Metriorhynchidae) such as paddlelike fins. This mode of subaqueous locomotion is suggested to have contributed to the survival of dyrosaurids such as Chenanisuchus across the K-Pg boundary.
