= Atlantosuchus =

Atlantosuchus Temporal range: Late Palaeocene

Scientific classification
- Domain: Eukaryota
- Kingdom: Animalia
- Phylum: Chordata
- Class: Reptilia
- Clade: Archosauria
- Clade: Pseudosuchia
- Clade: Crocodylomorpha
- Clade: Crocodyliformes
- Family: †Dyrosauridae
- Genus: †Atlantosuchus; Buffetaut and Wouters, 1979

Type species
- †Atlantosuchus coupatezi Buffetaut and Wouters, 1979

Extinct genus of reptiles

Atlantosuchus is an extinct genus of dyrosaurid crocodylomorph from Morocco. One defining characteristic that distinguishes it from other long-snouted dyrosaurids was its proportionally elongate snout, the longest in proportion to body size of any dyrosaurid. Rhabdognathus, a hyposaurine dyrosaurid, is believed to have been the closest relative of the genus.
