= Rhabdognathus =

Rhabdognathus Temporal range: Late Cretaceous – Paleocene

Scientific classification
- Domain: Eukaryota
- Kingdom: Animalia
- Phylum: Chordata
- Class: Reptilia
- Clade: Archosauria
- Clade: Pseudosuchia
- Clade: Crocodylomorpha
- Family: †Dyrosauridae
- Genus: †Rhabdognathus; Swinton, 1930

Species
- †R. rarus Swinton, 1930 (type); †R. aslerensis Jouve, 2007; †R. keiniensis Jouve, 2007

Extinct genus of reptiles

Rhabdognathus is an extinct genus of dyrosaurid crocodylomorph. It is known from rocks dating to the Paleocene epoch from western Africa, and specimens dating back to the Maastrichtian era were identified in 2008. It was named by Swinton in 1930 for a lower jaw fragment from Nigeria. The type species is Rhabdognathus rarus. Stéphane Jouve subsequently assessed R. rarus as indeterminate at the species level, but not at the genus level, and thus dubious. Two skulls which were assigned to the genus Rhabdognathus but which could not be shown to be identical to R. rarus were given new species: R. aslerensis and R. keiniensis, both from Mali. The genus formerly contained the species Rhabdognathus compressus, which was reassigned to Congosaurus compressus after analysis of the lower jaw of a specimen found that it was more similar to that of the species Congosaurus bequaerti. Rhabdognathus is believed to be the closest relative to the extinct Atlantosuchus.

== Description ==
Rhabdognathus has an extremely elongated snout that makes up around 75% of the length of the entire skull. The total skull length of R. keiniensis is 73.1 centimetres (28.8 in), while the length of the skull of R. aslerensis is unknown because the front of the snout is not preserved in the only known skull, CNRST-SUNY-190. The mandible of Rhabdognathus is as high as it is wide or higher, which distinguishes it from Hyposaurus. The mandible is dorsally directed toward the tip, and the first pair of alveoli (tooth sockets) at the very tip of the jaw are higher than the others. Another distinguishing feature is the extreme length of the mandibular symphysis, which extends past the nineteenth mandibular alveolus. The splenial also extends beyond this point, although the position of its symphysis varies during growth. The alveoli of Rhabdognathus are rounded and directed slightly laterally, causing the teeth to project at an angle.

The skulls of R. aslerensis and R. keiniensis possess numerous characters that distinguish Rhabdognathus from other dyrosaurids. The posterior wall of the supratemporal fenestra inclines dorsally so that it is visible when the skull is viewed in dorsal aspect. In Dyrosaurus phosphaticus, the wall is vertical and thus not visible in dorsal aspect. In both species of Rhabdognathus, the space between the occipital condyle and the basioccipital tubera (both located in the back of the skull where the vertebrae articulate) is anteroposteriorly longer than in D. phosphaticus. In the skulls of both species of Rhabdognathus, the posterior margin is inclined so that both the occipital condyle and the basioccipital tubera below it are visible in occipital view.
