= Sokotosuchus =

Sokotosuchus Temporal range: Maastrichtian ~70–66 Ma

Scientific classification
- Kingdom: Animalia
- Phylum: Chordata
- Class: Reptilia
- Clade: Archosauria
- Clade: Pseudosuchia
- Clade: Crocodylomorpha
- Family: †Dyrosauridae
- Genus: †Sokotosuchus; Halstead 1975

Type species
- †Sokotosuchus ianwilsoni Halstead 1975

Extinct genus of reptiles

Sokotosuchus is an extinct genus of dyrosaurid crocodyliform which existed during the Maastrichtian in western Africa. Fossils of the genus were found in the Dukamaje Formation of Nigeria, and some cranial material has possibly been found in Mali.
