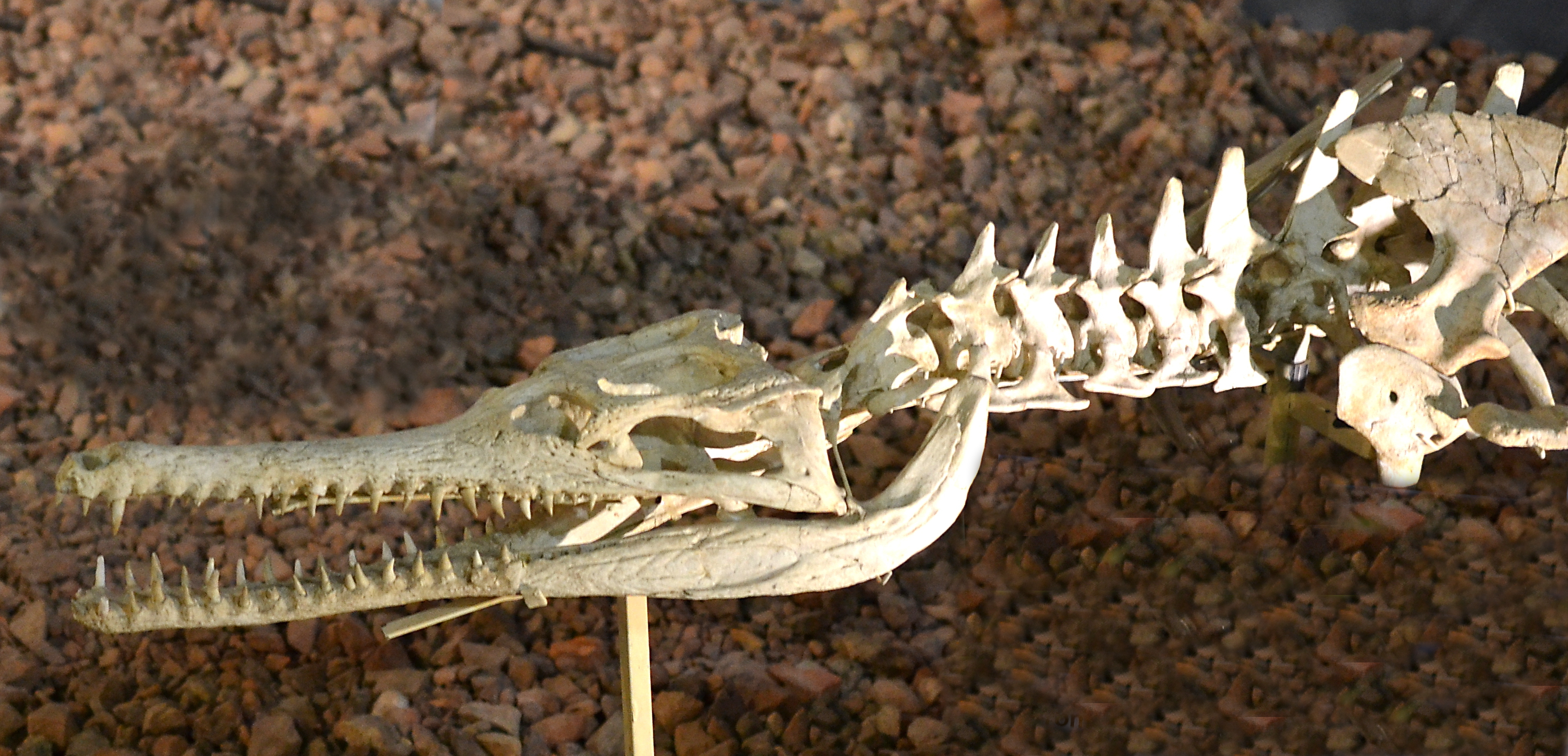
- Restored skeleton
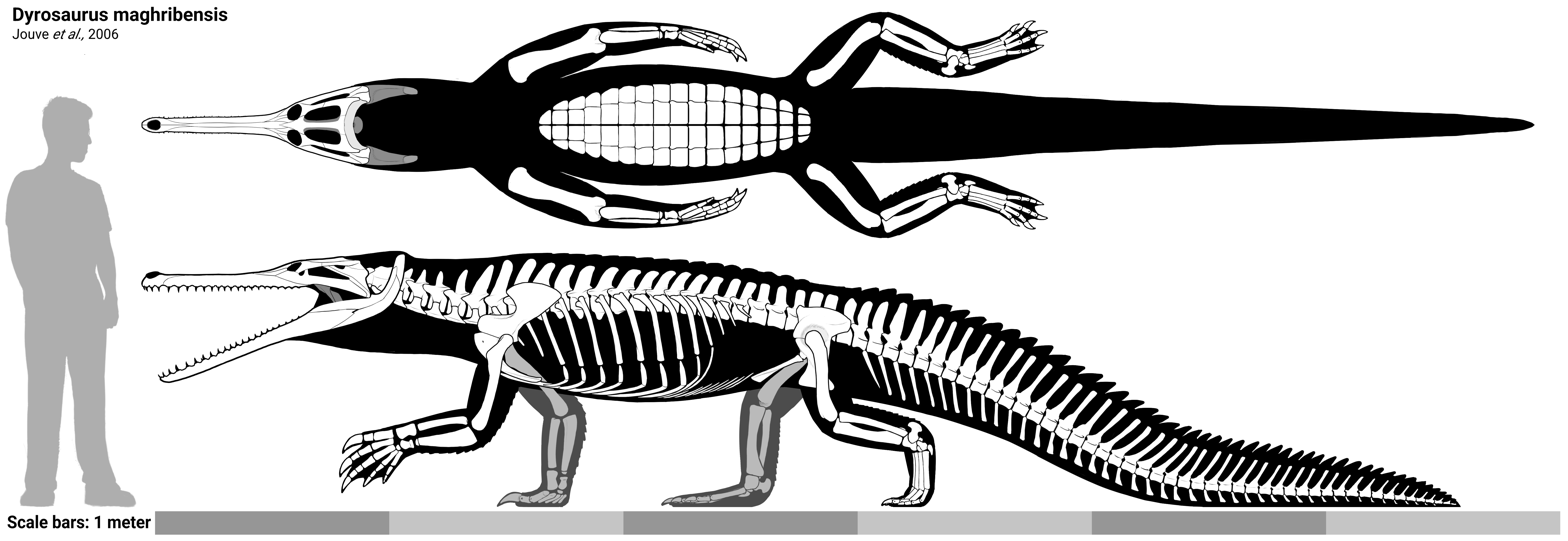
- Skeletal reconstruction of Dyrosaurus maghribensis in lateral view (bottom) and key elements in dorsal view (top)

Scientific classification
- Kingdom: Animalia
- Phylum: Chordata
- Class: Reptilia
- Clade: Pseudosuchia
- Clade: Crocodylomorpha
- Family: †Dyrosauridae
- Genus: †Dyrosaurus; Pomel, 1894

Species
- †D. phosphaticus (Thomas, 1893) (type); †D. maghribensis Jouve et al., 2006

= Dyrosaurus =

Dyrosaurus Temporal range: early Eocene (Ypresian), 56–47 Ma

Extinct genus of reptiles

Dyrosaurus is a genus of extinct crocodylomorph that lived during the Early Eocene. The name Dyrosaurus comes from sauros (σαῦρος) the Greek for lizard or reptile, and Dyr for Djebel Dyr (mountain) close to where the type species was discovered. It was a large reptile with an estimated body length of 6.5 metres (21 ft).

== Species ==
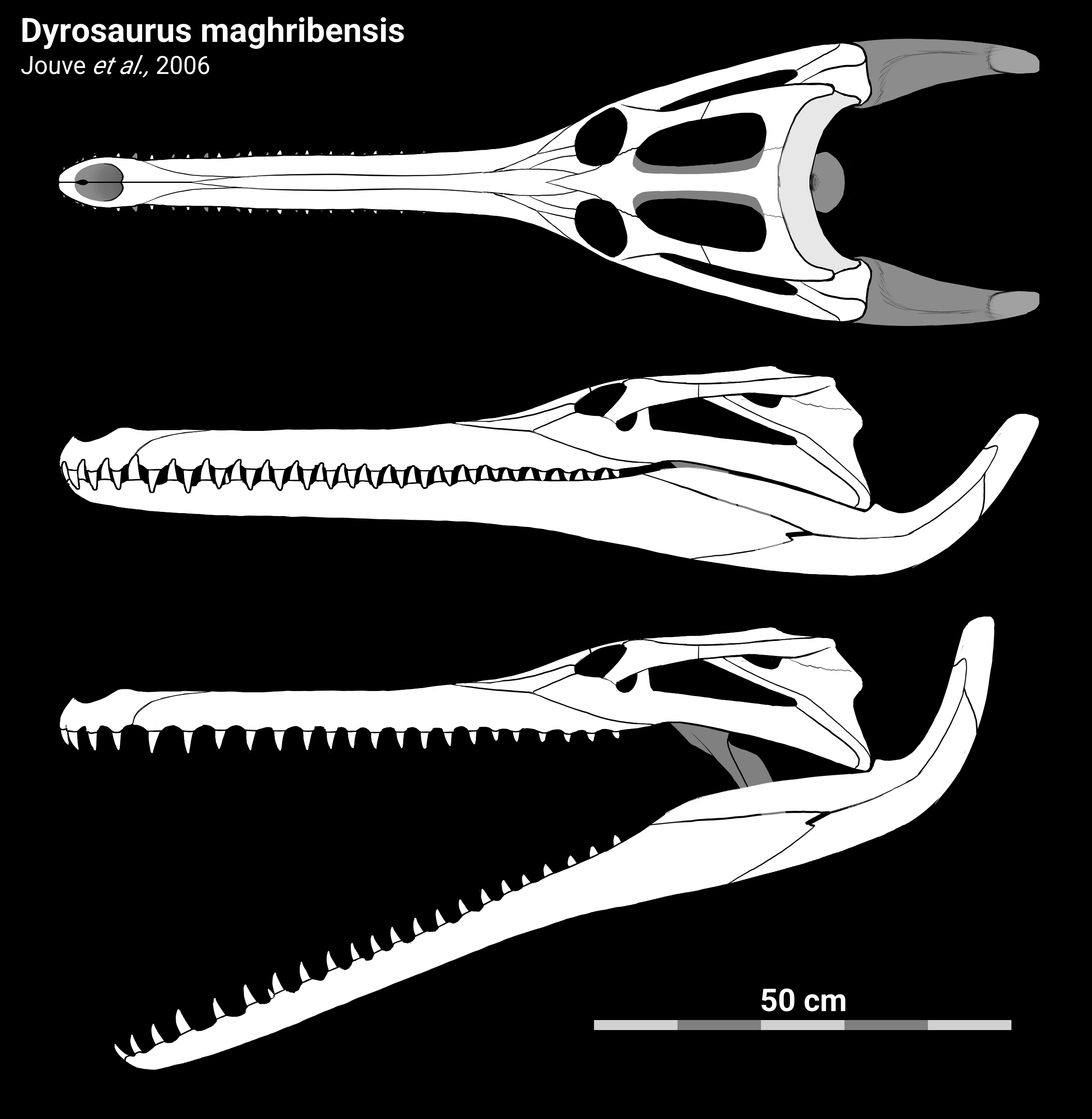
Skull diagram of Dyrosaurus maghribensis

Although the family Dyrosauridae is quite diverse and contains a variety of species, the genus Dyrosaurus has only two described species: D. phosphaticus and D. maghribensis. D. phosphaticus was first discovered in Algeria and Tunisia whereas D. maghribensis has only been found in Morocco. D. maghribensis differs from D. phosphaticus by several synapomorphies, most notably: a smooth dorsal margin of the parietal and widely opened choanae, interfenestral bar wide and strongly T-shaped instead of moderately T-shaped. In D. maghribensis the lateral and medial dorsal osteoderms are not sutured and have no serrated margin. The anterolateral margin of medial row of the dorsal osteoderms have a rounded lateral lobe and the lateral row of dorsal osteoderms are square in shape with rounded corners. In D. phosphaticus there are four longitudinal rows of square osteoderms that are thin and have shallow and wide pits. The osteoderms are square and the anterolateral margin of the medial dorsal osteoderms have an acute rounded process directed laterally.

== History of discovery ==
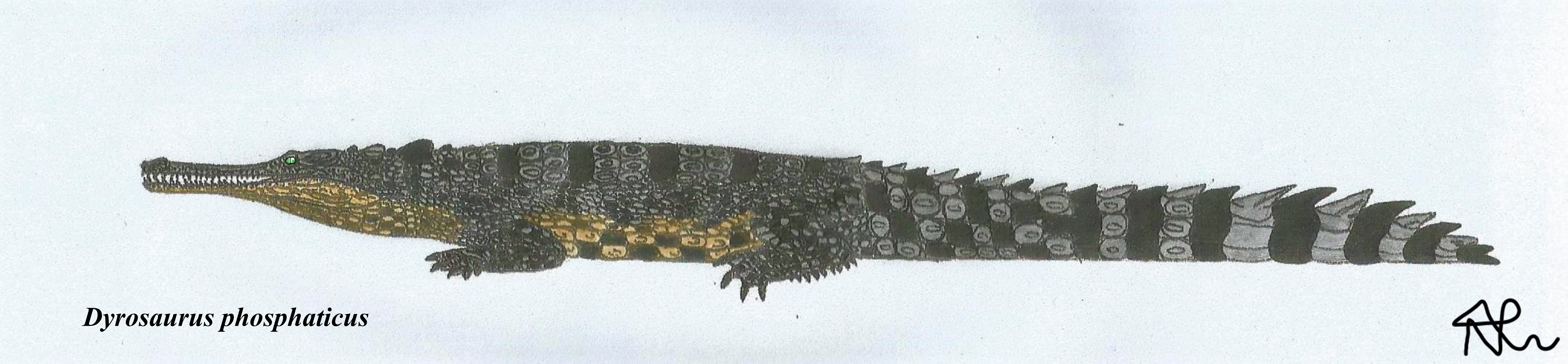
Restoration of the animal

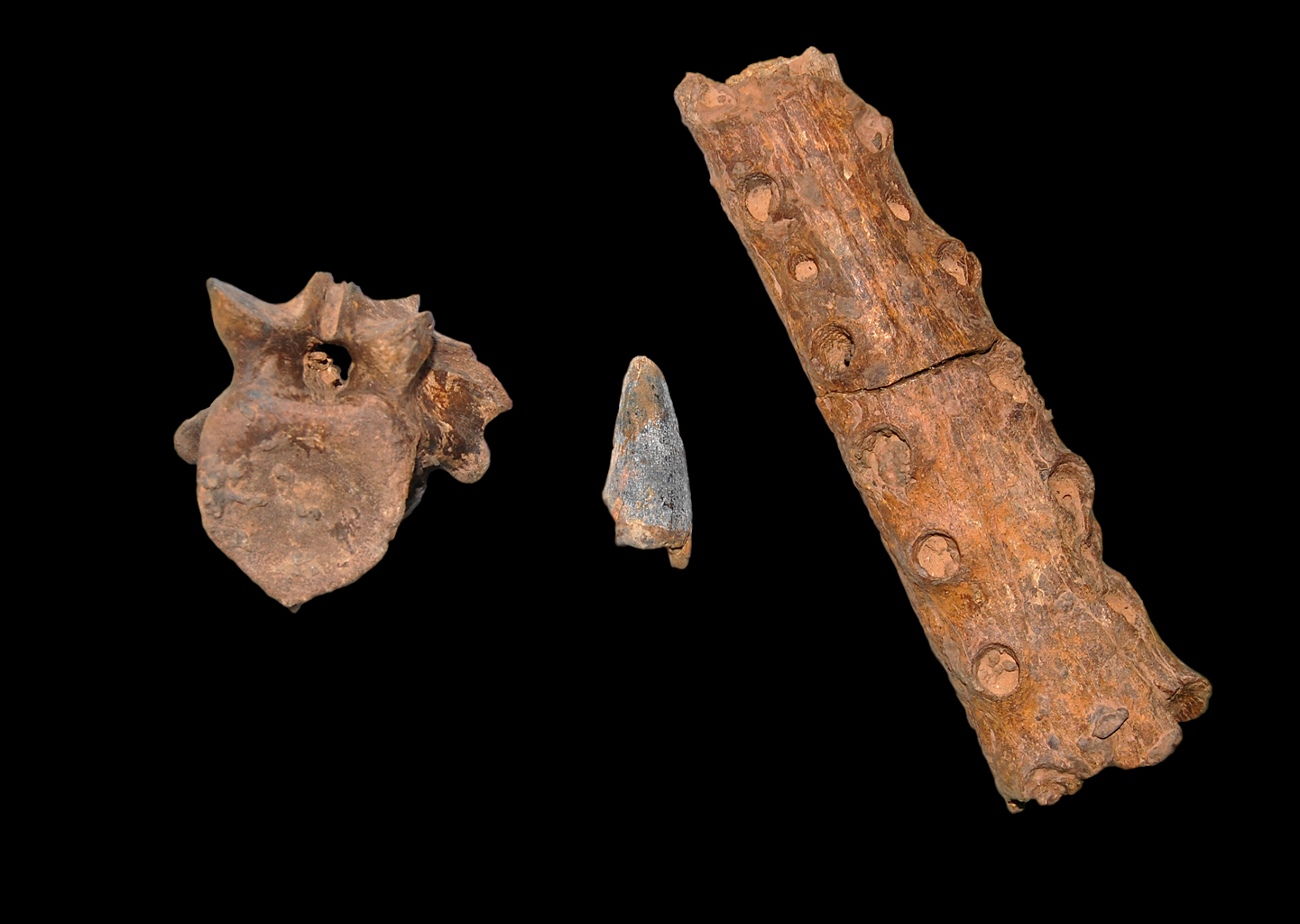
Jaw and other fragments

French paleontologist Auguste Pomel named the genus Dyrosaurus in 1894 for Djebel Dyr, a mountain near Tebessa in Algeria where its fossilised vertebrae were found in a phosphate mine. The holotype named MNHN 1901-11 includes one tooth, one caudal vertebra, one distal extremity of an ulna and one distal extremity of a radius. The first remains of Dyrosaurus were named Crocodilus phosphaticus by Thomas (1893) for Early Eocene crocodyliform remains from Gafsa, Tunisia. Pomel eventually synonymized the type species D. thevestensis with C. phosphaticus to form the new combination D. phosphaticus, making phosphaticus the epithet of the Dyrosaurus type species. In 1903, the family Dyrosauridae was named by Giuseppe de Stefano referring to the locality for the holotype was found in Djebel Dyr, Algeria. Thévenin (1911a, 1911b), with some better preserved material, recognized that Dyrosaurus phosphaticus was a Lower Eocene crocodyliform. Many dyrosaurid remains are known, but they are often poorly preserved, which makes it difficult for paleontologists to get a strong understanding of the family.

== Palaeobiology ==
=== Thermoregulation ===
Stable isotopic and palaeohistological analysis indicates that Dyrosaurus was ectothermic, having similar body temperature, metabolic rate, bone tissue morphology, and red blood cell dimensions to present-day crocodylians, consistent with the hypothesis that neosuchians were ancestrally ectothermic. It likely thus shared a similar lifestyle to modern crocodylomorphs.
