= 2008 in paleontology =

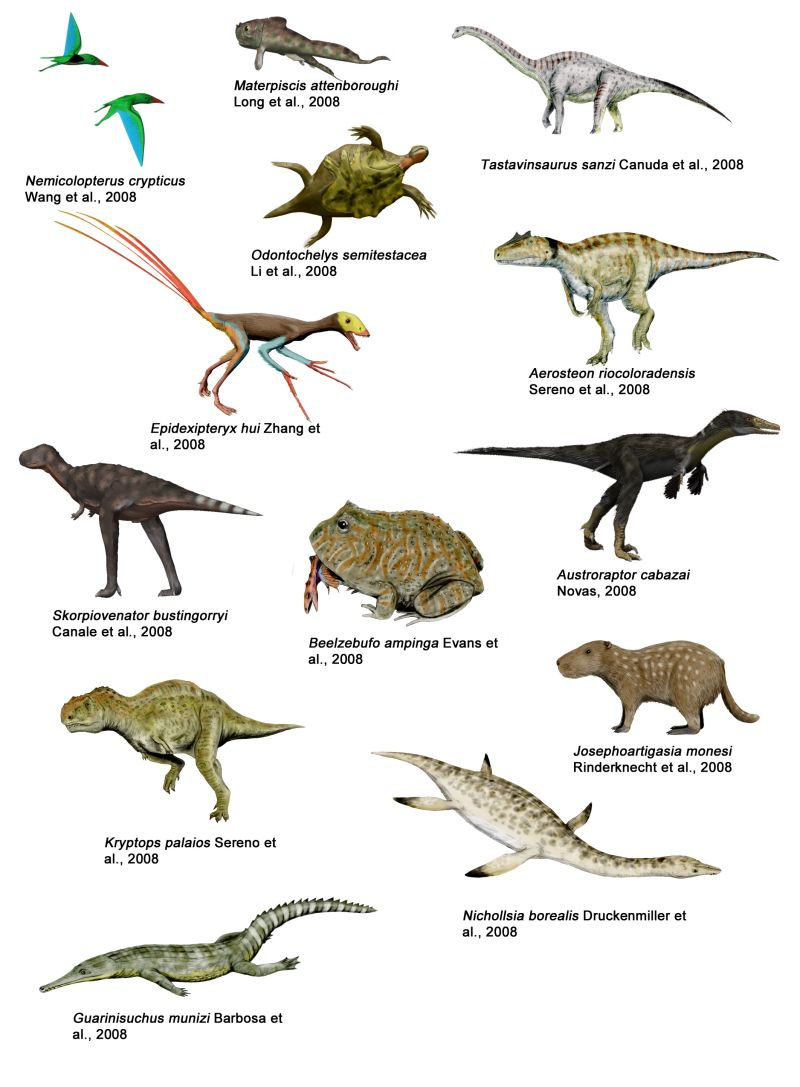
Important finds in 2008

Paleontology or palaeontology is the study of prehistoric life forms on Earth through the examination of plant and animal fossils. This includes the study of body fossils, tracks (ichnites), burrows, cast-off parts, fossilised feces (coprolites), palynomorphs and chemical residues. Because humans have encountered fossils for millennia, paleontology has a long history both before and after becoming formalized as a science. This article records significant discoveries and events related to paleontology that occurred or were published in the year 2008.

== Protozoa ==
=== New taxa ===
Name	Novelty	Status	Authors	Age	Unit	Location	Notes	Images
Paleoleishmania neotropicum	sp nov	Valid	Poinar	Burdigalian	Dominican amber	Dominican Republic	second record, and youngest, of the extinct genus Paleoleishmania	Paleoleishmania neotropicum

== Plants ==
=== Ferns and fern allies ===
Name	Novelty	Status	Authors	Age	Unit	Location	Synonymy	Notes	Images
Calcaropteris	Gen et 2 sp nov	valid	Miller & Hickey	Cretaceous; Late Albian	Winthrop Formation	USA; Washington		A matoniaceous morphogenus. The type species is C. boeselii Also includes C. bifurcata	
Cladophlebis baja-beeceensis	Sp nov	valid	Miller & Hickey	Cretaceous; Late Albian	Winthrop Formation	USA; Washington		A osmundaceous foliage morphospecies.	
Cladophlebis methowensis	Sp nov	valid	Miller & Hickey	Cretaceous; Late Albian	Winthrop Formation	USA; Washington		A osmundaceous foliage morphospecies.	
Furcillopteris	Gen, sp, et comb nov	valid	(R.W. Brown) Miller & Hickey	Paleocene; Danian	Fort Union Formation	USA; Colorado		A fern morphogenus of uncertain affinity. The type species is Dryopteris serrata (1962); Also includes F. oblongata	
Microphyllopteris delicata	Sp nov	valid	Miller & Hickey	Cretaceous; Late Albian	Winthrop Formation	USA; Washington		A gleicheniaceous morphospecies.	
Microphyllopteris gieseckiana	Comb nov	valid	(Heer) Miller & Hickey	Cretaceous; Late Albian	Winthrop Formation	USA; Washington	Gleichenites nordenskioldi auct. non (Heer) Seward nee Bell, 1956)	A gleicheniaceous morphospecies. Moved from Gleichenia gieseckiana (1868)	
Neocalamites vaganta	Sp nov	valid	Miller & Hickey	Cretaceous; Late Albian	Winthrop Formation	USA; Washington		An apocalamitaceous morphospecies.	
Paramatonia	Gen et sp nov	valid	Miller & Hickey	Cretaceous; Late Albian	Winthrop Formation	USA; Washington		A matoniaceous morphogenus. The type species is P. linearis	
Sectilopteris	Gen et 3 comb nov	valid	(Fontaine) Miller & Hickey	Cretaceous; Aptian	Patuxent Formation	USA; Virginia		A fern morphogenus of uncertain affinity. The type species is Sphenopteris latiloba (1886); Also includes Sphenopteris newberryi (1956) & Hymenopteris psilotoides (1824)	
Winthropteris	Gen et sp nov	valid	Miller & Hickey	Cretaceous; Late Albian	Winthrop Formation	USA; Washington		A blechnaceous morphogenus. The type species is W. ovalis	

=== Angiosperms ===
Name	Novelty	Status	Authors	Age	Unit	Location	Notes	Images
Dillhoffia	Gen. et sp. nov.	Valid	Manchester & Pigg	Ypresian	Unnamed Formation, Kamloops Group	Canada		Dillhoffia cachensis
Pluricarpellatia	Gen. et sp. nov.	Valid	Mohr, Bernardes-de-Oliveira & Taylor	Early Cretaceous	Crato Formation	Brazil		

=== Monocots ===
Name	Novelty	Status	Authors	Age	Unit	Location	Notes	Images
Montrichardia aquatica	sp nov	Valid	Herrera et al	Middle to late Paleocene	Cerrejón Formation	Colombia	only fossil record of the genus Montrichardia	
Petrocardium	gen et sp nov	Valid	Herrera et al	Middle to late Paleocene	Cerrejón Formation	Colombia	Two named species Petrocardium cerrejonense and Petrocardium wayuuorum	

== Arthropoda ==
=== Arachnomorphs ===
Name	Novelty	Status	Authors	Age	Unit	Location	Notes	Images
Dicranocaris	Gen et sp nov	valid	Briggs, Lieberman, Hendricks, Halgedahl & Jarrard	Middle Cambrian	Wheeler Formation; Marjum Formation	United States	An arachnormorph of uncertain classification. Type species D. guntherorum	
Nettapezoura	Gen et sp nov	valid	Briggs, Lieberman, Hendricks, Halgedahl & Jarrard	Middle Cambrian	Marjum Formation	United States	An arachnormorph of uncertain classification. Type species N. basilika	
Palaeosiro	Gen et sp nov	valid	Poinar	Cenomanian	Burmese amber	Myanmar	A stylocellid harvestman. Type species P. burmanicum	

=== Crustaceans ===
==== Research ====
- Schram (2008) publishes an adjustment to the taxonomy of Paleozoic stomatopods, erecting the family Archaeocarididae.

=== Insects ===
Name	Novelty	Status	Authors	Age	Unit	Location	Notes	Images
Cataglyphoides	Gen et sp et comb nov	Valid	Dlussky	Middle Eocene	Baltic amber	Europe	Fossil formicine ant, two species C. constrictus (Mayr, 1868) & C. intermedius Dlussky, 2008	Cataglyphoides constrictus
Dolichoderus punctatus	Sp nov	Valid	Dlussky	Middle Eocene	Baltic amber	Europe	Fossil dolichoderine ant	Dolichoderus punctatus
Electropodagrion	Gen et sp nov	valid	Azar & Nel	Middle Eocene	Baltic Amber	Europe	A Megapodagrionidae damselfly	
Elektroepyris	Gen et sp nov	Valid	Perrichot & Nel	Eocene	Oise amber	France	A bethylid wasp	Elektroepyris magnificus
Formosibittacus	gen et sp nov	Valid	Li, Ren & Shih	Middle Jurassic	Jiulongshan Formation	China	A bittacid	
Haidomyrmodes	gen et sp nov	Valid	Perrichot et al	Middle Cretaceous	Charentese amber	France	A Sphecomyrminae ant, type species H. mammuthus	Haidomyrmodes mammuthus
Jurahylobittacus	gen et sp nov	Valid	Li, Ren & Shih	Middle Jurassic	Jiulongshan Formation	China	A bittacid	
Lutzomyia adiketis	sp nov	Valid	Poinar	Burdigalian	Dominican amber	Dominican Republic	Vector for the extinct Trypanosomatidae species Paleoleishmania neotropicum	Lutzomyia adiketis
Proraphidia gomezi	sp nov	Valid	Jarzembowski	Lower Cretaceous	Lower Weald Clay	England		
Proraphidia hopkinsi	sp nov	Valid	Jarzembowski	Barremian		Spain		
Proteroscelio gravatus	Sp nov	valid	Johnson, Musetti & Masner	Early Cretaceous (Aptian)	Lebanese Amber	Lebanon	A member of Platygastroidea.	
Rhabdepyris gallicus	Sp nov	Valid	Perrichot & Nel	Eocene	Oise amber	France	A bethylid wasp	Rhabdepyris gallicus
Sinomeganeura	gen et sp nov	Valid	Ren, Nel, & Prokop	Namurian	Tupo Formation	China	Third Namurian age Meganeuridae griffenfly described.	
Sinoprotelenomus	Nom nov	valid	Zhang in Johnson, Musetti & Masner	Miocene		China	A member of Platygastroidea; replacement name for Protelenomus Zhang (1989).	
Sphecomyrmodes occidentalis	Sp nov	jr syn	Perrichot et al	Middle Cretaceous	Charentese amber	France	A stem group ant jr synonym of Gerontoformica occidentalis	Gerontoformica occidentalis
Syndesus ambericus	Sp nov	Valid	Woodruff	Burdigalian	Dominican amber	Dominican Republic	A stag beetle	
Termitaradus avitinquilinus	Sp nov	Valid	Grimaldi & Engel	Burdigalian	Dominican amber	Dominican Republic	A termite bug	

=== Xiphosurans ===
Name	Novelty	Status	Authors	Age	Unit	Location	Notes	Images
Lunataspis	gen et sp nov	Valid taxon	Nowlan, Rudkin, & Young	Late Ordovician	Churchill River Group?	Canada		

== Fishes ==
=== Bony fish ===
Name	Novelty	Status	Authors	Age	Unit	Location	Notes	Images
Arquatichthys		Valid	Lu & Zhu	Devonian (Pragian)	Posongchong Formation	China	A basal member of Dipnomorpha. The type species is A. porosus.	
Donnrosenia		Valid	Long, Choo, & Young	Devonian (Givetian)	Aztec Siltstone	Antarctica	A basal member of Actinopterygii. Genus includes new species D. schaefferi.	
Genyonemus whistleri		Valid	Takeuchi & Huddleston	Late Miocene	Puente Formation	United States	A relative of the white croaker.	
Hiodon woodruffi	Comb nov	valid	(Wilson)	Ypresian	Klondike Mountain Formation	United States; Washington	A mooneye, Moved from Eohiodon woodruffi Wilson 1978	Hiodon woodruffi
Tarachomylax multicostatus		Valid	Qiao & Zhu	Devonian (Emsian)	Chuandong Formation	China	A lungfish.	

=== Cartilaginous fish ===
Name	Novelty	Status	Authors	Age	Unit	Location	Notes	Images
Thrinacoselache	Gen. et. sp. nov.	Jr. synonym	Grogan & Lund	Carboniferous (Serpukhovian)	Bear Gulch Limestone	USA	Type species is T. gracia. Genus now a junior synonym of Thrinacodus.	

=== Placoderms ===
Name	Novelty	Status	Authors	Age	Unit	Location	Notes	Images
Gavinaspis	Gen. et. sp. nov.	Valid	Dupret & Zhu	Early Devonian (Lochkovian)	Xitun Formation	China	A phyllolepid.	
Materpiscis	gen et sp nov	Valid	Long, Trinajstic, Young, & Senden	Late Devonian	Gogo Formation	Australia	discovered with fossilized embryo.	Materpiscis embryo features

=== General research ===
- Hilton & Grande redescribe the fossil mooneyes of western North America synonymizing the genus Eohiodon with Hiodon.
- Cicimurri, Paris, & Everhart describe a partial dentition from a Holocephali chimaeroid fish found in the Niobrara Chalk.

== Amphibians ==
Jenkins, F. A., jr, Shubin, N. H., Gatesy, S. M., and Warren, A., 2008, Gerrothorax pulcherrimus from the Upper Triassic Fleming Fjord Formation of East Greenland and a reassessment of head lifting in temnospondyl feeding: Journal of Vertebrate Paleontology, v. 28, n. 4, p. 935-950.

=== Newly named amphibians ===
Name	Status	Authors	Age	Unit	Location	Notes	Images
Beelzebufo	Valid taxon	Evans; Jones; Krause	Late Cretaceous (70 mya)	Maevarano Formation	Madagascar		An artist's depiction of Beelzebufo
Gerobatrachus	Valid taxon	Anderson; Reisz; Scott; Fröbisch; Sumida	Early Permian (290 mya)		USA (Texas)		An artist's depiction of Beelzebufo
Oumtkoutia	Valid taxon	Rage; Dutheil	Late Cretaceous (Cenomanian)	Kem Kem Beds	Morocco	A pipid anuran.	An artist's depiction of Beelzebufo

== Archosaurs ==
=== Newly named pseudosuchians ===
Name	Novelty	Status	Authors	Age	Unit	Location	Notes	Images
Acynodon adriaticus	Sp. nov	Valid	Delfino, Martin & Buffetaut	Late Cretaceous		Italy		
Dakosaurus carpenteri	Sp. nov	Valid	Wilkinson, Young & Benton	Late Jurassic (Kimmeridgian)	Kimmeridge Clay Formation	United Kingdom	A metriorhynchid crocodyliform. Originally described as a species of Dakosaurus, subsequently transferred to the separate genus Torvoneustes.	
Gryposuchus croizati	Sp. nov	Valid	Riff & Aguilera	Late Miocene	Urumaco Formation	Venezuela		
Guarinisuchus	Gen. et sp. nov	Valid	Barbosa, Kellner & Viana	Early Paleocene (Danian)	Maria Farinha Formation	Brazil	A dyrosaurid crocodyliform. Genus includes new species G. munizi.	
Ocepesuchus	Gen. et sp. nov	Valid	Jouve et al.	Late Cretaceous (Maastrichtian)	Ouled Abdoun Basin	Morocco	A member of Gavialoidea. Genus includes new species O. eoafricanus.	
Postosuchus alisonae	Sp. nov	Valid	Peyer et al.	Late Triassic	Newark Supergroup	United States (North Carolina)		
Sierritasuchus	Gen. et sp. nov	Valid	Parker, Stocker & Irmis	Late Triassic	Tecovas Formation	United States (Texas)	An aetosaur Genus includes new species S. macalpini.	
Sphagesaurus montealtensis	Sp. nov	Valid	Andrade & Bertini	Late Cretaceous	Adamantina Formation	Brazil	A sphagesaurid crocodyliform. Originally described as a species of Sphagesaurus, but subsequently transferred to the genus Caipirasuchus.	
Wargosuchus	Gen. et sp. nov	Valid	Martinelli & Pais	Late Cretaceous	Bajo de La Carpa Formation	Argentina	A baurusuchid crocodyliform. Genus includes new species W. australis.	

=== Newly named pterosaurs ===
Name	Status	Location	Authors	Notes
Elanodactylus	Valid	China	Andres Ji, Q.	
Hongshanopterus	Valid	China	Xiaolin Wang de Almeida et al.	
Mythunga	Valid	Australia	Molnar Thulborn, R.A.	
Nemicolopterus	Valid	China	Wang Kellner et al.	
Raeticodactylus	Junior synonym	Switzerland	Stecher	Jr. synonym of Caviramus
Shenzhoupterus	Valid	China	Lü J. Unwin et al.	
Volgadraco	Valid	Russia	Averianov Arkhangelsky Pervushov	

=== Dinosaurs ===
- Oviraptorosaurian eggs with embryonic skeletons are discovered for the first time in China.
- Mongolian Late Jurassic theropod fossils are found for the first time.
- A new study on morphological variation in shed theropod teeth from the Mil River Formation is published.

==== Newly named dinosaurs ====
28 new dinosaur genera were erected in 2008. Data courtesy of George Olshevky's dinosaur genera list.

Name	Status	Authors	Age	Unit	Location	Notes	Images
Austroraptor	Valid	Novas; Pol; et al. (Note: Novas, Pol, Canale, Porfiri, Calvo.)	Campanian–Maastrichtian	Allen Formation	Argentina	The largest dromaeosaurid yet discovered in the Southern Hemisphere.	Austroraptor
Dakotadon	Valid	Paul	Barremian	Lakota Formation	USA (South Dakota)	A new genus for "Iguanodon" lakotaensis (Weishampel and Bjork, 1989).	
Daxiatitan	Valid	You; Li; et al. (Note: You, Li, Zhou, Ji.)	Lower Cretaceous	Lanzhou Basin	China	A basal titanosaur.	Daxiatitan
Diceratus	Junior synonym	Mateus	Late Cretaceous			Objective junior synonym of Nedoceratops; possible junior synonym of Triceratops.	
Dollodon	Valid	Paul	Barremian	Bernissart	Belgium	An iguanodontian.	Dollodon
Dongyangosaurus	Valid	Lü; Azuma; et al. (Note: Lü, Azuma, Chen, Zheng, Jin.)	early Late Cretaceous	Fangyang Formation	China	A titanosauriform.	
Duriavenator	Valid	Benson	Bajocian	Dorset	United Kingdom	A megalosaurid.	Duriavenator
Eocarcharia	Valid	Sereno; Brusatte	Aptian/Albian	Elrhaz Formation	Niger	A carcharodontosaurid.	Eocarcharia
Eomamenchisaurus	Valid	Lü; Li; et al. (Note: Lü, Li, Zhong, Ji, Li.)	Middle Jurassic	Zhanghe Formation	China	A mamenchisaurid.	
Epidexipteryx	Valid	Zhang; Zhou; et al. (Note: Zhang, Zhou, Xu, Wang, Sullivan.)	Late Jurassic	Daohugou Beds	China	An avialian.	Epidexipteryx
Gobiceratops	Valid	Alifanov	Late Cretaceous	Baruungoyot Formation	Mongolia	Possible junior synonym of Bagaceratops.	
Kryptops	Valid	Sereno; Brusatte	Aptian/Albian	Elrhaz Formation	Niger	An abelisaurid.	Kryptops
Loricatosaurus	Valid	Maidment; Norman; et al. (Note: Maidment, Norman, Barrett, Upchurch.)	Callovian		England; France	A stegosaurid.	
Microceratus	Nomen dubium	Mateus	Campanian		China		
Orkoraptor	Valid	Novas; Ezcurra; Lecuona	Maastrichtian	Pari Aike Formation	Argentina	A neovenatorid.	Orkoraptor
Peloroplites	Valid	Carpenter; Bartlett; et al. (Note: Carpenter, Bartlett, Bird, Barrick.)	Lower Cretaceous	Cedar Mountain Formation	USA	A nodosaurid ankylosaur.	
Pitekunsaurus	Valid	Filippi; Garrido	Campanian	Anacleto Formation	Argentina	A titanosaur.	
Qingxiusaurus	Valid	Mo; Huang; et al. (Note: Mo, Huang, Zhao, Wang, Xu.)	Late Cretaceous		China	A titanosaur.	
Sahaliyania	Valid	Godefroit; Hai; et al. (Note: Godefroit, Hai, Yu, Lauters.)	Maastrichtian	Yuliangze Formation	China	A lambeosaurine hadrosaurid.	
Similicaudipteryx	Valid	He; Wang; Zhou	Aptian	Jiufotang Formation	China	A caudipterid oviraptorosaur.	Similicaudipteryx
Tastavinsaurus	Valid	Canudo; Royo-Torres; Cuenca-Bescós	Aptian	Xert Formation	Spain	A titanosauriform. Lurasiformes.	Tastavinsaurus
Uberabatitan	Valid	Salgado; Carvalho	Upper Cretaceous	Marília Formation	Brazil	A titanosaur.	Tethyshadros
Wulagasaurus	Valid	Godefroit; Hai; et al.	Maastrichtian	Yuliangze Formation	China	A saurolophine hadrosaurid.	

==== Newly named birds ====
Name	Novelty	Status	Authors	Age	Unit	Location	Notes	Images
Aegolius martae	Sp. nov.	Valid	Marco Pavia	Early/Middle Pleistocene	Sicily	Italy: Sicily	A Strigidae.	
Bermuteo avivorus	Gen. nov. et Sp. nov.	Valid	Storrs L. Olson	Late Pleistocene		Bermuda	An Accipitridae, this is the type species of the new genus.	
Bountyphaps obsoleta	Gen. nov. et Sp. nov.	Valid	Trevor H. Worthy Graham M. Wragg	Subrecent	Henderson Island	Pitcairn	A Columbidae, this is the type species of the new genus.	
Calonectris wingatei	Sp. nov.	Valid	Storrs L. Olson	Middle Pleistocene		Bermuda	A Procellariidae.	
Caracara tellustris	Sp. nov.	Valid	Storrs L. Olson	Holocene		Jamaica	A Falconidae.	
Cathayornis chabuensis	Sp. nov.	Valid	Li Jianjun Li Zhiheng Zhang Yuguang Zhou Zhonghe Bai Zhiqiang Zhang Lifu Ba Tuya	Early Cretaceous	Jinchuan Formation	China	A Cathayornithidae Zhou, Jin et Zhang, 2006, Enantiornithes Walker, 1981.	
Certhiops rummeli	Gen. nov. et Sp. nov.	Valid	Albrecht Manegold	Early Miocene	MN 3	Germany: Bavaria	A Certhioidea, this is the type species of the new genus.	
Didactylornis jii	Gen. nov. et Sp. nov.	Valid	Yuan Chongxi	Lower Cretaceous	Jiufotang Formation	China	Basal pygostylia, Sapeornithidae, this is the type species of the new genus.	
Enantiophoenix electrophyla	Gen. nov. et Sp. nov.	Valid	Andrea Cau Paolo Arduini	Upper Cretaceous		Lebanon	An Enantiornithes Walker, 1981, Avisauridae Brett-Surman et Paul, 1985, this is the type species of the new genus.	
Eoconfuciusornis zhengi	Gen. nov. et Sp. nov.	Valid	Fucheng Zhang Zhonghe Zhou Michael Benton	Lower Cretaceous	Dabeigou Formation	China	A Primitive Confuciusornithidae Hou, Zhou, Gu et Zhang, 1995, this is the type species of the new genus.	
Ephippiorhynchus tchoufour	Sp. nov.	Valid	Antoine Louchart Yohannes Haile-Selassie Patrick Vignaud Androssa Likius Michel Brunet	Late Miocene	ca 7 Ma	Chad	A Ciconiidae.	
Eurotrochilus noniewiczi	Sp. nov.	Valid	Zygmunt Bochenski Zbigniew Bochenski	Early Oligocene	Late Rupelian	Poland	A new European species of the Trochilidae.	
Foudia delloni	Sp. nov.	Valid	Anthony S. Cheke Julian P. Hume	Subrecent	Not seen since 1672	Réunion	The original Foudia from Réunion.	
Hokkaidornis abashiriensis	Gen. nov. et Sp. nov.	Valid	Kazuhiko Sakurai Masaichi Kimura Takayuki Katoh	Late Oligocene	Tokoro Formation	Japan	A Plotopteridae Howard, 1969, this is the type species of the new genus.	
Jabiru codorensis	Sp. nov.	Valid	Stig A. Walsh Rodolfo Sánchez	Early Pliocene	Codore Formation, Middle El Jebe Member	Venezuela	A Ciconiidae.	
Leptoptilos patagonicus	Sp. nov.	Valid	Jorge I. Noriega Gerardo Cladera	Late Miocene	Puerto Madryn Formation	Argentina	A Ciconiidae.	
Manuherikia douglasi	Sp. nov.	Valid	Trevor H. Worthy Alan J. D. Tennyson Suzanne J. Hand R. Paul Scofield	Early-Middle Miocene	Bannockburn Formation	New Zealand	An Anatidae, Anserinae.	
Megadyptes waitaha	Sp. nov.	Valid	Sanne Boessenkool Jeremy J. Austin Trevor H. Worthy R. Paul Scofield Alan Cooper Philip J. Seddon Jonathan M. Waters	Late Holocene	Subrecent	New Zealand	A Spheniscidae, when it became extinct it made room for Megadyptes antipodes.	
Mopsitta tanta	Gen. nov. et Sp. nov.	Valid	David W. Waterhouse Bent E. K, Lindow Nikita V. Zelenkov Gareth J. Dyke	Early Eocene, Ypresian	Fur Formation	Denmark	Described in the Psittaciformes, Gerald Mayr, 2009 sees no reasons to place the species in Psittaciformes.	
Palaeortyx volans	Sp. nov.	Valid	Ursula B. Göhlich Marco Pavia	Neogene	Gargano	Italy	A Phasianidae.	
Pelagornis mauretanicus	Sp. nov.	Valid	Cécille Mourer-Chauviré Denis Geraads	Late Pliocene	Ahl al Oughlam	Morocco	A Pelagornithidae Fürbringer, 1888.	
Pengornis houi	Gen. nov. et Sp. nov.	Valid	Zhou Zhonghe Julia A. Clarke Zhang Fucheng	Early Cretaceous	Jiufotang Formation	China	An Enantiornithes Walker, 1981, this is the type species of the new genus and the type genus of the new family Pengornithidae Wang, O'Connor, Zheng, Wang, Hu et Zhou, 2014.	
Phaethusavis pelagicus	Gen. nov. et Sp. nov.	Valid	Estelle Bourdon Mbarek Amaghzaz Baâdi Bouya	Early Eocene	Early Ypresian	Morocco	A Phaethontidae, this is the type species of the new genus.	
Pleistovultur nevesi	Gen. nov. et Sp. nov.	Valid	Herculano M. F. de Alvarenga Guilherme R. R. Brito Rafael Migotto Alex Hubbe Elizabeth Höfling	Late Pleistocene-Early Holocene		Brazil	A Cathartidae, this is the type species of the new genus.	
Thomasococcyx philohippus	Gen. nov. et Sp. nov.	Valid	David W. Steadman	Early Miocene	Hemingfordian LMA	USA: Florida	A Cuculidae, this is the type species of the new genus.	
Tirarinetta kanunka	Gen. nov. et Sp. nov.	Valid	Trevor H. Worthy	Pliocene	Tirari Formation	Australia South Australia	An Anatidae, this is the type species of the new genus.	
Zhongornis haoae	Gen. nov. et Sp. nov.	Valid	Gao Chunling Luis M. Chiappe Meng Qinjing Jingmai O'Connor Wang Xuri Cheng Xiaodong Liu Jinyuan	Lower Cretaceous	Yixian Formation	China	Basal Aves, this is the type species of the new genus.	
Zygodactylus luberonensis	Sp. nov.	Valid	Gerald Mayr	Early Oligocene	MP 23-24	France	A Zygodactylidae Brodkorb, 1971, ?Piciformes.	

=== Other publications ===
- Hutchinson, J.R., Miller, C., Fritsch, G., and Hildebrandt, T. 2008. The anatomical foundation for multidisciplinary studies of animal limb function: examples from dinosaur and elephant limb imaging studies; pp. 23–38 in Endo, H. and Frey, R. (eds.), Anatomical Imaging: Towards a New Morphology. Springer Verlag, Tokyo.
- Witmer, L.M., Ridgely, R.C., Dufeau, D.L., and Semones, M.C. 2008. Using CR to peer into the past: 3D visualization of the brain and ear regions of birds, crocodiles, and nonavian dinosaurs; pp. 67–88 in Endo, H. and Frey, R. (eds.), Anatomical Imaging: Towards a New Morphology. Springer Verlag, Tokyo.

== Turtles ==
=== Newly named turtles ===
Currently valid turtle genera named in 2008
Name	Status	Location	Authors	Images
Condorchelys	Valid taxon	Argentina	Sterli	
Kharakhutulia	Valid taxon	Mongolia	Sukhanov, Danilov & Syromyatnikova	
Odontochelys	Valid taxon	China	Li et al.	Odontochelys

== Squamates ==
=== new taxa ===
Name	Novelty	Status	Authors	Age	Unit	Location	Notes	Images
Itaboraiophis	gen et sp nov	Valid	Rage	Middle Paleocene		Brazil	A "booid"-grade snake of uncertain phylogenetic placement. The type species is Itaboraiophis depressus.	
Kuwajimalla	gen et sp nov	Valid	Evans & Manabe	Early Cretaceous (Valanginian to Hauterivian)	Kuwajima Formation	Japan	A polyglyphanodontian lizard. The type species is Kuwajimalla kagaensis.	
Merkurosaurus	gen et sp nov	Valid	Klembara	Early Miocene		Czech Republic	A member of Anguimorpha, might be related to the Chinese crocodile lizard. The type species is Merkurosaurus ornatus.	
Ovoo	gen et sp nov	Valid	Norell, Gao, & Conrad	Late Cretaceous	near Ukhaa Tolgod	Mongolia	one of the oldest monitor lizards	
Paraungaliophis	gen et sp nov	Valid	Rage	Middle Paleocene		Brazil	A snake related to members of the genus Ungaliophis. The type species is Paraungaliophis pricei.	
Paulacoutophis	gen et sp nov	Valid	Rage	Middle Paleocene		Brazil	A booid-grade snake of uncertain phylogenetic placement. The type species is Paulacoutophis perplexus.	
Prognathodon kianda	sp nov	Valid	Schulp et al.	Late Cretaceous (Maastrichtian)		Angola	A mosasaur.	
Selmasaurus johnsoni	sp nov	Valid	Polcyn & Everhart	Late Cretaceous (early Santonian)	Niobrara Chalk	United States	A mosasaur.	
Taniwhasaurus mikasaensis	sp nov	Valid	Caldwell, Konishi, Obata, & Muramoto	upper Santonian-lower Campanian		Japan	Third identified species for the genus Taniwhasaurus	
Tianyusaurus	gen et sp nov	Valid	Lü et al.	Late Cretaceous	Qiupa Formation	China	A polyglyphanodontian lizard. The type species is Tianyusaurus zhengi.	
Tinosaurus indicus	Sp nov	Valid	Prasad & Bajpai	Early Eocene	Cambay Shale	India	An agamid lizard, a species of Tinosaurus.	
Vallecillosaurus	gen et sp nov	Valid	Smith & Buchy	Late Cretaceous (early Turonian)	Agua Nueva Formation	Mexico	A member of Mosasauroidea of uncertain phylogenetic placement. The type species is Vallecillosaurus donrobertoi.	
Vastanagama	Gen. et sp. nov	Valid	Prasad & Bajpai	Early Eocene	Cambay Shale	India	An agamid lizard. The type species is Vastanagama susani.	

=== New papers ===
- Everhart, M.J. (2008). "A bitten skull of Tylosaurus kansasensis (Squamata: Mosasauridae) and a review of mosasaur-on-mosasaur pathology in the fossil record". Transactions of the Kansas Academy of Science. 111 (3/4): 251–262. doi:10.1660/0022-8443-111.3.251. S2CID 85647383.
- Everhart, M.J. 2008. The mosasaurs of George F. Sternberg, paleontologist and fossil photographer. Proceedings of the Second Mosasaur Meeting, Fort Hays Studies Special Issue 3, Fort Hays State University, Hays, Kansas, pp. 37–46.
- Polcyn, M.J. and Everhart, M.J. 2008. Description and phylogenetic analysis of a new species of Selmasaurus (Mosasauridae: Plioplatecarpinae) from the Niobrara Chalk of western Kansas. Proceedings of the Second Mosasaur Meeting, Fort Hays Studies Special Issue 3, Fort Hays State University, Hays, Kansas, pp. 13–28.
- Polcyn, M.J., Bell, G.L., Jr., Shimada, K. and Everhart, M.J. 2008. The oldest North American mosasaurs (Squamata: Mosasauridae) from the Turonian (Upper Cretaceous) of Kansas and Texas with comments on the radiation of major mosasaur clades. Proceedings of the Second Mosasaur Meeting, Fort Hays Studies Special Issue 3, Fort Hays State University, Hays, Kansas, pp. 137–155.
- Everhart, M.J. 2008. Rare occurrence of a Globidens sp. (Reptilia; Mosasauridae) dentary in the Sharon Springs Member of the Pierre Shale (Middle Campanian) of Western Kansas. p. 23-29 in Farley G. H. and Choate, J.R. (eds.), Unlocking the Unknown; Papers Honoring Dr. Richard Zakrzewski, Fort Hays Studies, Special Issue No. 2, 153 p., Fort Hays State University, Hays, KS.

== Sauropterygians ==
=== New taxa ===
Name	Status	Authors	Notes
Glyphoderma	Valid	Zhao et al.	
Nichollsia	renamed	Druckenmiller Russell	Nichollsia preoccupied by a genus of isopod, renamed in 2009 to Nichollssaura
Occitanosaurus	Synonym	Bardet Fernandez Garcia-Ramos Superbiola Pinuela Ruiz-Omenaca Vincent	Junior Synonym of Microcleidus.
Wumengosaurus	Valid	Jiang et al.	

== Synapsids ==
=== Non-mammalian ===
Name	Status	Authors	Age	Unit	Location	Notes	Images
Alrausuchus	Valid	Ivakhnenko	Middle Permian		Russia	A new genus for "Biarmosuchus" tagax	
Megawhaitsia	Valid	Ivakhnenko	Upper Permian		Russia		

=== Mammal ===
Newly named mammals
Name	Status	Authors	Age	Unit	Location	Notes	Images
Albireo savagei	Valid	Barnes	Late Pliocene	Pismo Formation	United States (California)	A member of Delphinoidea belonging to the family Albireonidae, a species of Albireo.	
Cantalera	Valid	Badiola; Canudo; Cuenca-Bescós	Early Cretaceous (late Hauterivian-early Barremian)		Spain	A multituberculate belonging to the family Pinheirodontidae. The type species is C. abadi.	
Crenatocetus	Valid	McLeod; Barnes	Eocene		United States (North Carolina)	A member of Protocetidae. The type species is Crenatocetus rayi.	
Cynarctoides whistleri	Valid	Wang; Tedford	Hemingfordian		United States (California and Texas)	A member of Canidae belonging to the subfamily Borophaginae, a species of Cynarctoides.	
Diceratherium radtkei	Valid	Prothero; Rasmussen	Arikareean	Cabbage Patch beds Harrison Formation; Sharps Formation	United States (South Dakota, Montana and Nebraska)		
Djourabus	Valid	Peigné et al.	Late Miocene		Chad	A member of Mustelidae belonging to the subfamily Lutrinae. The type species is D. dabba.	
Floridameryx	Valid	Webb	Late Miocene to earliest Pliocene		United States (Florida and New Mexico)	A member of Gelocidae belonging to the subfamily Pseudoceratinae. The type species is F. floridanus; genus also includes "Pseudoceras" klausi Frick (1937).	
Fossendorhinus	Valid	Mihlbachler	Uintan			A member of Brontotheriidae; a new genus for "Telmatherium" diploconus Osborn (1895)	
Fredszalaya	Valid	Shockey; Anaya	Late Oligocene		Bolivia	A member of Borhyaenidae. The type species is Fredszalaya hunteri.	
Glibia namibiesis	Valid	Pickford; Senut; Morales; Mein; Sanchez	Eocene (Lutetian)		Namibia	A rodent belonging to the family Zegdoumyidae, a species of Glibia.	
Merycopotamus thachangensis	Valid	Hanta; Ratanasthien; Kunimatsu; Saegusa; Nakaya; Nagaoka; Jintasakul	Late Miocene		Thailand		
Metalopex	Valid	Tedford; Wang	Late Clarendonian to early Hemphillian	Ash Hollow Formation; Kern River Formation; Rattlesnake Formation; Thousand Creek Formation	United States (Arizona, California, Nebraska, Oregon, Texas, Idaho and Oregon)	A fox. The type species is Metalopex merriami.	
Mioheteromys crowderensis	Valid	Lindsay; Reynolds	Late Hemingfordian to Barstovian	Barstow Formation; Crowder Formation	United States	A rodent belonging to the family Heteromyidae, a species of Mioheteromys.	
Namahyrax	Valid	Pickford; Senut; Morales; Mein; Sanchez	Eocene (Lutetian)		Namibia	A hyrax. The type species is Namahyrax corvus.	
Namaia	Valid	Pickford; Senut; Morales; Mein; Sanchez	Eocene (Lutetian)		Namibia	Probably a member of the family Adapidae. The type species is Namaia bogenfelsi. The generic name turned out to be preoccupied; Pickford and Uhen (2014) created a replacement name Notnamaia.	
Namalestes	Valid	Pickford; Senut; Morales; Mein; Sanchez	Eocene (Lutetian)		Namibia	A member of Cimolesta belonging to the family Todralestidae. The type species is Namalestes gheerbranti.	
Namatherium	Valid	Pickford; Senut; Morales; Mein; Sanchez	Eocene (Lutetian)		Namibia	An embrithopod. The type species is Namatherium blackcrowense.	
Nasamplus	Valid	Mihlbachler	Late Eocene (Ulangochuian)			A member of Brontotheriidae; a new genus for "Metatitan" progressus Granger and Gregory (1943).	
Pollyosbornia	Valid	Mihlbachler	Uintan	Uinta Formation	United States (Wyoming)	A member of Brontotheriidae; a new genus for "Telmatherium" altidens Osborn (1908).	
Prepomonomys	Valid	Pickford; Senut; Morales; Mein; Sanchez	Eocene (Lutetian)		Namibia	A rodent belonging to the family Diamantomyidae. The type species is Prepomonomys bogenfelsi.	
Proadinotherium saltoni	Valid	Shockey; Anaya	Late Oligocene		Bolivia	A member of Toxodontidae, a species of Proadinotherium.	
Siamoadapis	Valid	Chaimanee; Yamee; Tian; Chavasseau; Jaeger	Middle Miocene		Thailand		
Silicamys	Valid	Pickford; Senut; Morales; Mein; Sanchez	Eocene (Lutetian)		Namibia	A rodent belonging to the family Myophiomyidae. The type species is Silicamys cingulatus.	
Sivaonyx beyi	Valid	Peigné et al.	Late Miocene		Chad	A member of Mustelidae belonging to the subfamily Lutrinae.	
Stenomylus taylori	Valid	Cassiliano	Miocene (Hemingfordian)	Zia Formation	United States (New Mexico)	A camelid.	
Teilhardina magnoliana	Valid	Beard	Early Eocene	Tuscahoma Formation	United States (Mississippi)		
Wickia	Valid	Mihlbachler	Uintan	Sand Wash Basin; Washakie Formation	United States (Colorado)	A member of Brontotheriidae. The type species is Wickia brevirhinus.	

== Footnotes ==
=== Complete author list ===
As science becomes more collaborative, papers with large numbers of authors are becoming more common. To prevent the deformation of the tables, these footnotes list the contributors to papers that erect new genera and have many authors.
