= Hypolestes clara =

Conservation status
- Endangered (IUCN 3.1)

Scientific classification
- Kingdom: Animalia
- Phylum: Arthropoda
- Clade: Pancrustacea
- Class: Insecta
- Order: Odonata
- Suborder: Zygoptera
- Family: Hypolestidae
- Genus: Hypolestes
- Species: H. clara

Binomial name
- Hypolestes clara (Calvert, 1891)

Synonyms
- Ortholestes clara Calvert, 1891

Species of damselfly

Hypolestes clara is a species of damselfly in the family Hypolestidae. It is endemic to Jamaica. Its natural habitats are subtropical or tropical moist lowland forests and rivers. It is threatened by habitat loss.
