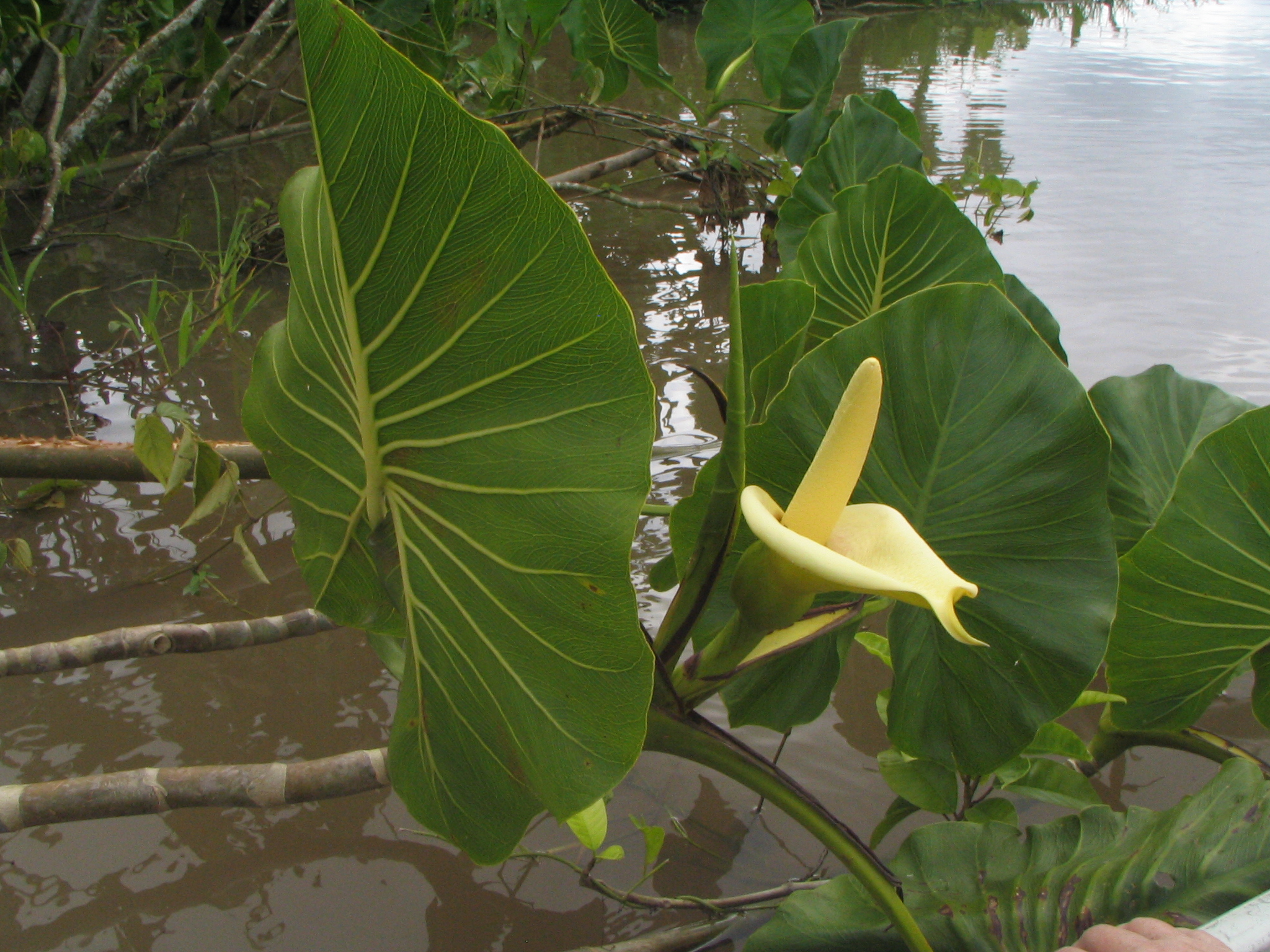
- Flower of Montrichardia linifera at a stand between Lago do Guedes and Lago do Iquito

Scientific classification
- Kingdom: Plantae
- Clade: Tracheophytes
- Clade: Angiosperms
- Clade: Monocots
- Order: Alismatales
- Family: Araceae
- Genus: Montrichardia
- Species: M. linifera

Binomial name
- Montrichardia linifera (Schott)

Synonyms
- Arum liniferum Arruda; Caladium liniferum (Arruda) Nees; Philodendron cyclophyllum K.Krause

= Montrichardia linifera =

Species of flowering plant

Montrichardia linifera, also known under the common name aninga, is a tropical plant native to South America. The aquatic species is a helophyte and can grow up to seven meters in height. The plant often grows in monospecific stands and thickes along rivers, lakes and other wetlands.

M. linifera can be differentiated from the similar M. arborescens by several characteristics, including having a spathe tube that is greenish-white internally and a spathe blade that is yellowish externally, while M. arborescens has a spathe-tube that is reddish internally and a spathe-blade that is green externally.

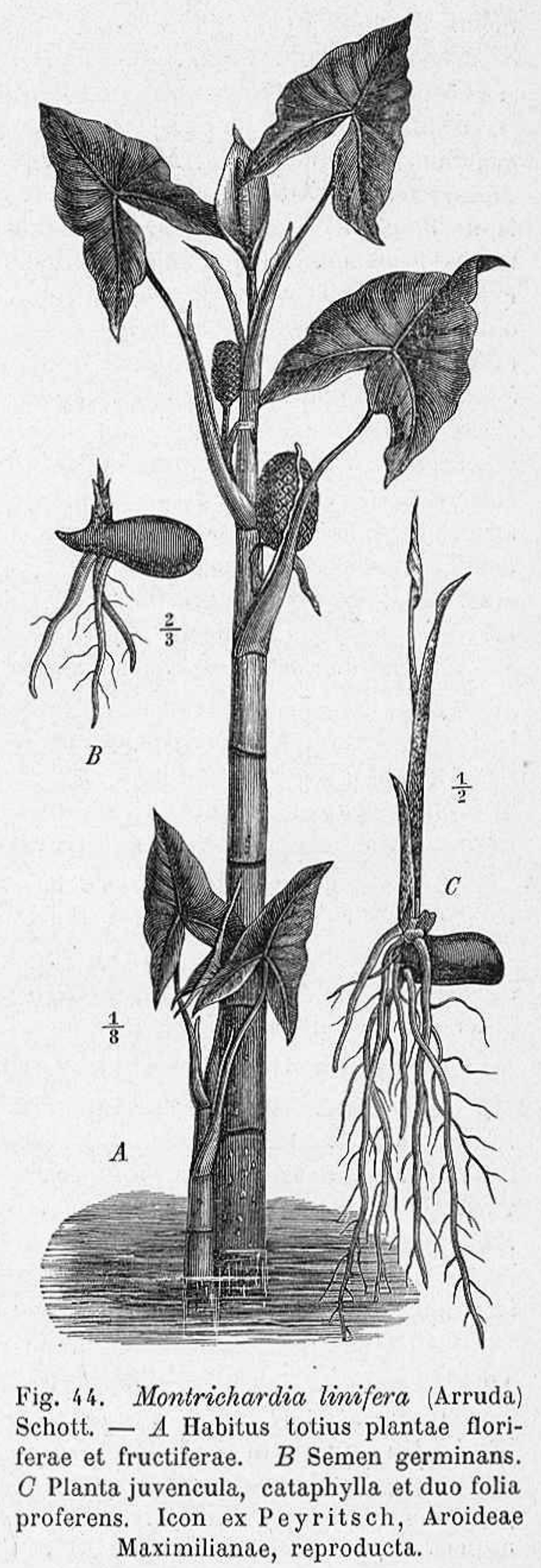
Botanical drawing of Montrichardia linifera plant
