= Hypolestes trinitatis =

Conservation status
- Vulnerable (IUCN 3.1)

Scientific classification
- Kingdom: Animalia
- Phylum: Arthropoda
- Clade: Pancrustacea
- Class: Insecta
- Order: Odonata
- Suborder: Zygoptera
- Family: Hypolestidae
- Genus: Hypolestes
- Species: H. trinitatis

Binomial name
- Hypolestes trinitatis (Gundlach, 1888)

Synonyms
- Ortholestes trinitatis Gundlach, 1888

Species of damselfly

Hypolestes trinitatis is a species of damselfly in the family Hypolestidae. It is endemic to Cuba. Its natural habitats are subtropical or tropical moist lowland forests and rivers. It is threatened by habitat loss.
