= Apocopodon =

Apocopodon Temporal range: Danian

Scientific classification
- Kingdom: Animalia
- Phylum: Chordata
- Class: Chondrichthyes
- Subclass: Elasmobranchii
- Order: Myliobatiformes
- Family: Myliobatidae
- Genus: †Apocopodon; Cope, 1886

Extinct eagle ray genus

Apocopodon is an extinct genus of eagle ray from the Paleocene epoch of the Paleogene period. It contains a single species A. sericeus. It was originally described from the Danian-aged Marina Farinha Formation of the Paraíba Basin of Brazil. Recently, the genus was reported in Kingstree, South Carolina probably derived from the lower paleocene-aged Rhems Formation, significantly extending the geographic range of the genus.
