= Pintomyia falcaorum =

Pintomyia falcaorum Temporal range: Burdigalian

Scientific classification
- Kingdom: Animalia
- Phylum: Arthropoda
- Class: Insecta
- Order: Diptera
- Family: Psychodidae
- Genus: Pintomyia
- Subgenus: Pifanomyia
- Species: †P. falcaorum

Binomial name
- †Pintomyia falcaorum Brazil & Andrade Filho, 2002

Extinct species of fly

Pintomyia falcaorum is an extinct species of sandfly in the moth fly subfamily Phlebotominae. P. falcaorum is solely known from early Miocene Burdigalian stage Dominican amber deposits on the island of Hispaniola.

== History and classification ==
The species is known solely from the holotype specimen, a complete male fly. The specimen is currently residing in the phlebotomine sandfly collection in the Centro de Pesquisas René Rachou. The centro is part of the Oswaldo Cruz Foundation in Minas Gerais Brazil. The specimen was collected from an unidentified amber mine in the Cordillera Septentrional north of Santiago de los Caballeros. The specimen was first studied by sandfly researchers Reginaldo Peçanha Brazil and José Dilermando Andrade Filho. Brazil and Andrade Filho published their 2002 type description in the journal Memórias do Instituto Oswaldo Cruz. The specific epithet "falcaorum" was coined by the author in honor of Alda and Alberto Falcão, to recognize their contributions to Phlebotominae understanding.

== Description ==
A number of features in the specimen indicate its placement in the moth fly subfamily Phlebotominae and the tribe Lutzomyiina. The specimen displays pre-apical bristles, and four spines on the style, these features combined with the AIII flagellomere being over half the length of the head. This combination of features indicates a placement in the genus Pintomyia. Within the genus, it is placed in the subgenus Pifanomyia, based on the posterior femurs lack of spines, but the species does not resemble the known modern species-group series. The light coloration of the abdomen on P. falcaorum is unlike the P. monticola series, while the P. pacae series have papillae on the AXIII segment. Papillae on the AV segment of the P. verrucarum, P. serrana and P. townsendi mark them as different from P. falcaorum.

Like Pintomyia falcaorum the Dominican amber fly species Pintomyia paleotownsendi has a Sc vein that is free while the Sc meets the costa vein in P. paleotrichia. In contrast P. brazilorum, P. killickorum, Lutzomyia filipalpis, L. miocena, L. paleopestis, L. schleei, and L. succini all possess an Sc which meets the R_{1} vein. The presence of a forked Sc vein in the wings, found in some Lutzomyia species including L. adiketis, is unique among the described species of sandflies from Dominican amber. Living members of the Phlebotominae suck blood from vertebrates, and P. falcaorum is presumed to have done so as well. However, the host(s) of this species has not been identified at this time.
