= Hermann Crüger =

German pharmacist and botanist

Hermann Crüger (11 February 1818, Hamburg – 28 February 1864, San Fernando) was a German pharmacist and botanist.

He was educated in pharmacy in Lüneburg and Hamburg prior to moving as a pharmacist to Trinidad in 1841. From 1857 until his death he served as a government botanist and director of the botanical garden in Port-of-Spain. He collected botanical specimens in Trinidad, Jamaica, Cuba and Venezuela.

Crüger was considered an important source of information for Charles Darwin on aspects of floral biology. In 1863 Darwin wrote to Crüger in regards to orchids, also inquiring him about the fecundation of certain species from the family Melastomataceae.

He left his herbarium to the botanical garden in Trinidad, and had also sent some specimens to Berlin and to the Kew Gardens. Taxa with the specific epithets of cruegeri, cruegeriana and cruegerianum commemorate his name. He is the taxonomic authority of the flowering plant genus Montrichardia (family Araceae).

== Published works ==
- "Outline of the Flora of Trinidad" (1858).
- "A Few Notes on the Fecondation of Orchids and Their Morphology" (with Charles Darwin, 1864).
