= Electropodagrion =

Electropodagrion Temporal range: Middle Eocene

Scientific classification
- Kingdom: Animalia
- Phylum: Arthropoda
- Clade: Pancrustacea
- Class: Insecta
- Order: Odonata
- Suborder: Zygoptera
- Family: Megapodagrionidae
- Genus: †Electropodagrion
- Species: †E. szwedoi

Binomial name
- †Electropodagrion szwedoi Azar & Nel, 2008

Extinct species of damselfly

Electropodagrion is an extinct genus of damselfly in the family Megapodagrionidae known from a fossil found in Europe. The genus contains a single described species, Electropodagrion szwedoi.

== History and classification ==
Electropodagrion is known from a solitary fossil, which is an inclusion in a transparent chunk of Baltic amber. The amber was recovered from fossil bearing rocks in the Baltic Sea region of Europe. Estimates of the age date between 37 million years old, for the youngest sediments and 48 million years old. This age range straddles the middle Eocene, ranging from near the beginning of the Lutetian to the beginning of the Pribonian.

At the time of study, the holotype was part of the paleoentomology collections housed by the Museum of Amber Inclusions, University of Gdańsk, in Gdańsk, Poland. It was first studied by paleoentomologists Dany Azar of the Lebanese University and André Nel of the Muséum National d’Histoire Naturelle. Their 2008 type description of the genus and species was published in the natural sciences journal Annales de la Société Entomologique de France. The genus name was coined as a combination of the Greek elektron meaning "amber" and podagrion the root of Megapodagrion, type genus of Megapodagrionidae. The specific epithet szwedoi was coined as a patronym honoring paleoentomologist Jacek Szwedo.

== Description ==
The E. szwedoi fossil is fragmentary, with only the upper half of one wing, one leg and the thorax with three wing bases preserved. All the wings are similar in structure and appearance, having an approximate length of 20 mm (0.79 in) and a maximum width of about 4.8 mm (0.19 in). The nodus, notch on the leading edge of the forewings, is placed 7.2 mm (0.28 in) from the base, and the pterostigma is 10.1 mm (0.40 in) further up the wing. The postnodal veins and the postsubnodal veins are aligned, a feature seen in Coenagrionomorpha damselflies, while the relatively square and shortened pterostigma preclude the genus belonging to Hypolestidae.
