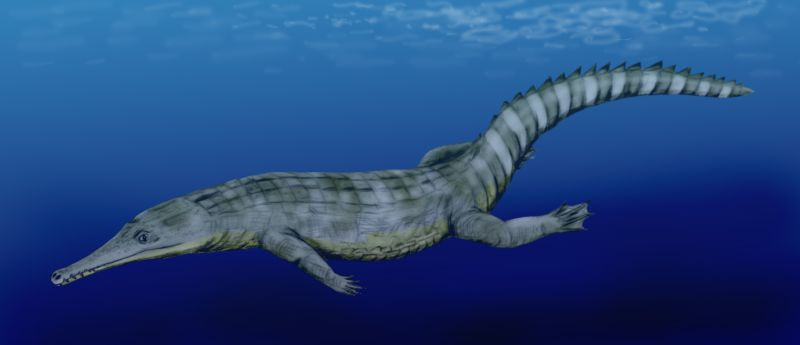
- Life restoration of Guarinisuchus munizi

Scientific classification
- Kingdom: Animalia
- Phylum: Chordata
- Class: Reptilia
- Clade: Pseudosuchia
- Clade: Crocodylomorpha
- Family: †Dyrosauridae
- Genus: †Guarinisuchus; Barbosa et al., 2008

Type species
- †G. munizi Barbosa et al., 2008

= Guarinisuchus =

Guarinisuchus Temporal range: Early Paleocene (Tiupampan-Peligran) ~66–61.7 Ma

Extinct genus of reptiles

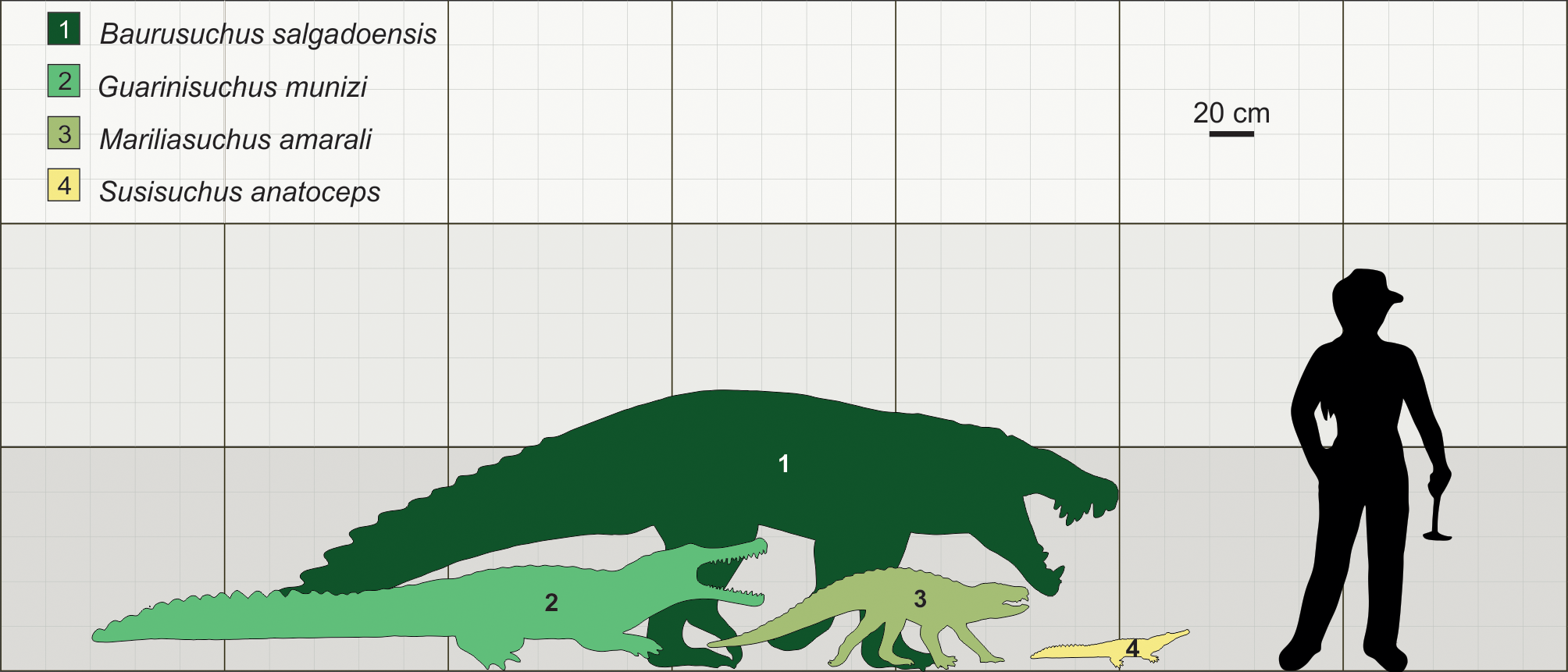
Size (2), compared to other Brazilian Cretaceous Crocodylomorphs

Guarinisuchus is an extinct monotypic genus of marine crocodyliform from the Early Palaeocene 62 million years ago in the Maria Farinha Formation, Brazil. The type species is G. munizi. The genus was a dominant predator in its environment, and probably reached a length of 3 metres (9.8 ft). Guarinisuchus appears to be closely related to marine crocodylomorphs found in Africa, which supports the hypothesis that the group originated in Africa and migrated to South America before spreading into the waters off the North American coast.

== Palaeobiology ==
=== Life history ===
Dental histology reveals the Lines of von Ebner of G. munizi show extreme variability in their spacing from one another, reflecting high degrees of plasticity of their dentine deposition rates and consequently their metabolism. This diverse set of reaction norms enabled the species to inhabit a broad diversity of habitats varying in their water temperature and resource availability.
