= Hypolestes =

Scientific classification
- Kingdom: Animalia
- Phylum: Arthropoda
- Clade: Pancrustacea
- Class: Insecta
- Order: Odonata
- Suborder: Zygoptera
- Family: Hypolestidae
- Subfamily: Hypolestinae; Tillyard & Fraser, 1938
- Genus: Hypolestes; Gundlach, 1888

Species
- Hypolestes clara; Hypolestes hatuey; Hypolestes trinitatis

Synonyms
- Ortholestes Calvert, 1891; Hypolestes Hagen, 1868

Genus of damselflies

Hypolestes is a damselfly genus and makes up the monotypic subfamily Hypolestinae of the damselfly family Hypolestidae.

Species include:

- Hypolestes clara (Jamaica)
- Hypolestes trinitatis (Cuba)
- Hypolestes hatuey (Hispaniola - Dominican Republic, Haiti)

The damselfly genus is exclusively found within Cuba, Haiti, and Hispaniola (The Greater Antilles), as indicated above. Hypolestes clara is commonly known as the "Jamaican flatwing," and Hypolestes trinitatis is known as the "Cuban flatwing." Hypolestes hatuey was discovered in 2015 and has no common name yet. As there are not many studies of the Hypolestes genus published, this is an overview what is currently known of the genus and the individual species within it.

== Anatomy and morphology ==
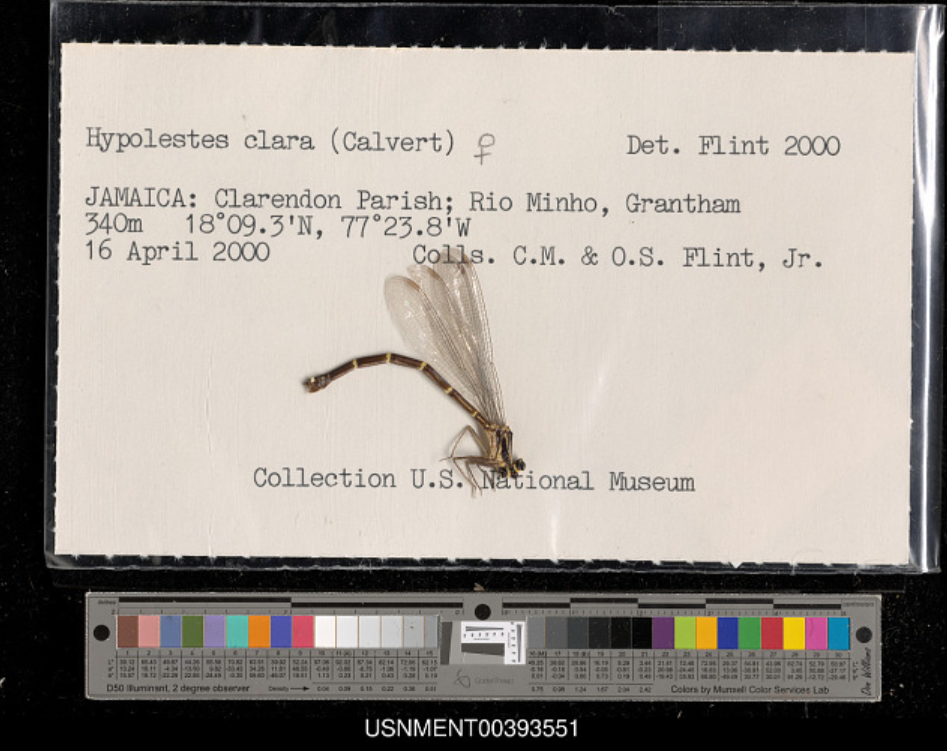
A Hypolestes clara female

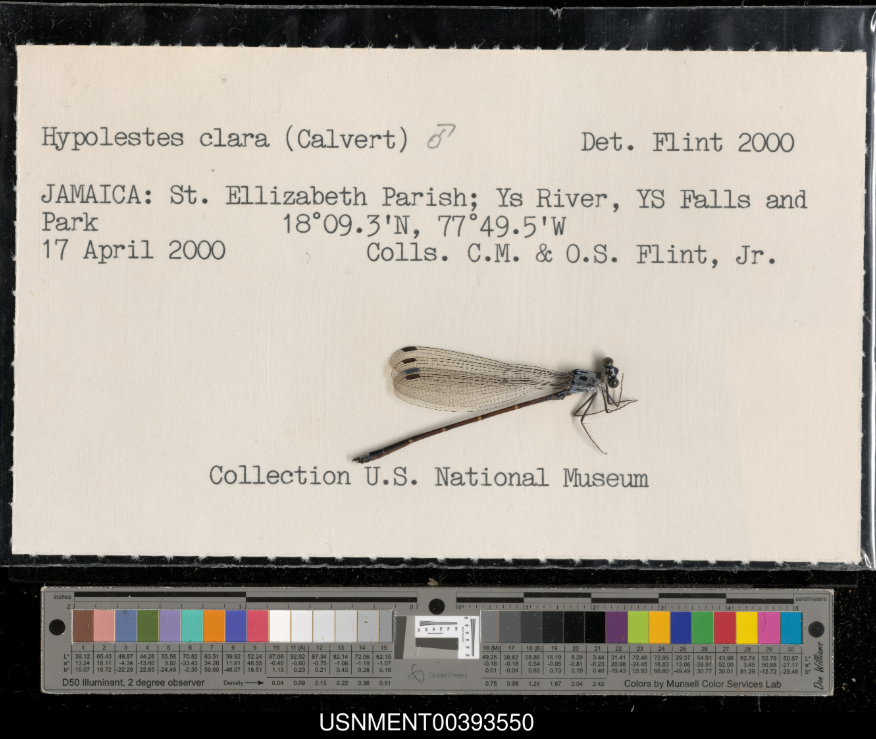
A Hypolestes clara male

Hypolestes have three tagmata (distinct body segments) for their anatomy, which includes the head, thorax, and abdomen. Like dragonflies, they have compound eyes on either side of their head. On their thorax, there are posterior forewings and anterior hindwings. Damselflies are weak fliers in comparison to dragonflies based on their wing and overall body structure. All damselflies have segmented thoraxes and abdomens. For reproduction structures, the male accessory genitalia located under the thorax on the second segment is called the genital ligula. The genital ligula branches off into four parts and is covered in spines for male-competition processes. Shape and size of male genital ligula differ between all three of the species. The primary female reproductive structure is an ovipositor, which is utilized post-copulation. Both males and females have anal appendages located on the abdomen, However, the female anal appendages are not protruded compared to the male anal appendages. In the Hypolestes species, forewings range from 23.6 to 25.8 millimeters in length, hindwings 22.6 to 25.0 millimeters, and the abdomen with anal appendages included are 28.5 to 20.2 millimeters. The total length of the individual can be from 39.5 to 43.6 millimeters long. The color of Hypolestes is dependent on the sex. Males are described to be a light blue, whereas females are black with vertical yellow striping down the thorax. The stripe pattern in females is identical in H. hatuey and H. trinitatis, but differs in H. clara.

== Species distribution ==
Hypolestes hatuey, H. trinitatis, and H. clara are estimated to have diverged into their separate species between 5.91 and 1.69 million years ago, through allopatric speciation in the Greater Antilles. H. trinitatis is distributed in both Eastern and Central Cuba, causing them to be genetically different from the geographical separation that occurred around 2.0 and 0.62 million years ago. However, they continue to share enough traits to be classified as the same species.

== Ecology ==
Hypolestes trinitatis and H. clara have both been found in subtropical or tropical moist lowland forests and freshwater rivers. H. hatuey inhabits forest streams in mountainous regions. All damselflies have an indirect development life cycle as they grow. They start out in eggs on a decaying riparian plant surface, then emerge as nymphs. Nymphs stay in the stream or river water until adulthood. The transition from nymph to the adult damselfly can take several years. Sexual maturity can be distinguished in females specifically because of the change in body color as they develop. Damselfly diet shifts in composition throughout sexual maturity. However, damselflies are predators throughout each life cycle stage. Nymphs tend to eat any organism that is smaller than itself, which can include organisms like small fish. Once it is able to fly, the adult diet consists primarily of flies, mosquitoes, or any other small insect that the adult can grab. When looking at sex ratios of H. trinitatis, males outnumber females 2:1. This outcome can be attributed to males estimated in having higher life expectancies in comparison to females, with 17.4 days to 15.5 days respectively, or to the sexual dimorphisms of the species as a whole.

== Sexual behavior ==
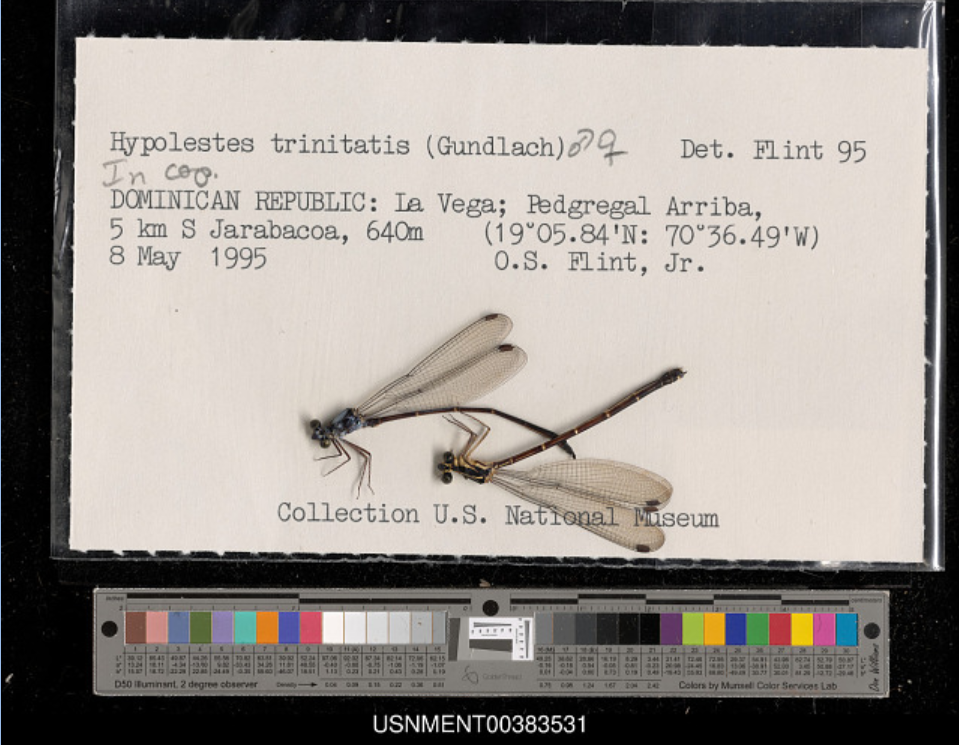
A Hypolestes trinitatis male and female

Hypolestes trinitatis males are territorial organisms when it comes to their space and with females for mating purposes. These males have perching sites within their habitats that they utilize for seeking prey and for locating females. Once a female enters their line of sight, the male intercepts her, clasps onto her neck with its anal appendage, and initiates copulation in flight. Post-copulation, the female will try to locate spots around the perching site to lay her eggs through her ovipositor. These spots tend to be on any wet or submerged riparian plant matter, in which the female will "quality test" by touching her ovipositor to these spots before laying eggs. Throughout oviposition process and until the female is finished egg-laying, the male will guard her. Females can take up to a week on average to develop and lay all of her eggs. Afterwards, the male will return to his perching site to defend his territory from other damselflies, hunt prey, or locate another mate. A unique sexual behavior that is shared by the entire family of Odonata is that males have the ability to remove the sperm of a previously mated male within a female. Before mating, they use the genital ligula (male accessory genitalia) to remove any previous male sperm stored within the female, demonstrating sperm competition between males. The most recent male to mate with the female and have her lay eggs with his sperm benefits from reproductive success and in turn fitness.

== Threats and conservation status ==
A Hypolestes hatuey male

The specific threats of Hypolestes species include deforestation from logging of the riparian forests, exploitation of rivers or streams by nearby human settlements, and pollution. Each of the Hypolestes species are rare to encounter within the Greater Antilles. Therefore, experts find it difficult to evaluate the conservation status of each species. The IUCN Red List for H. trinitatis states that it has a vulnerable (VU) status and for H. clara it is considered endangered (EN). However, these species have not been reevaluated since 2006 and 2009 respectively. Currently, there is no existing page for H. hatuey on the IUCN, since it was discovered in 2015. The most recent research on Hypolestes species, conducted in 2016, suggests that the conservation status of both H. trinitatis and H. clara remains the same, and for H. hatuey a near-threatened (NT) status. This was a research study conducted outside of the IUCN, and has yet to be assessed by the organization.

== Taxonomic History ==
The genus was described by Juan Gundlach in 1888 as a subgenus of Lestes in his Contribución a la Entomología Cubana. Because this work was published in separately issued fascicles that were poorly distributed outside Cuba, it remained largely unknown to later odonatologists. In a critical review published in 1919, Philip Calvert showed that Gundlach's name Hypolestes and the species Hypolestes trinitatis had priority over the later names Ortholestes and Ortholestes abbotti, which Calvert himself had proposed before becoming aware of Gundlach's publication.

== Etymology ==
The genus name Hypolestes is derived from the Greek ὑπό (hypo, "under", "below" or "somewhat") and Lestes, a genus of damselflies. The name probably reflects Gundlach's view that the genus was related to, or resembled, Lestes.
