= Arquatichthys =

Arquatichthys Temporal range: Pragian

Scientific classification
- Kingdom: Animalia
- Phylum: Chordata
- Clade: Dipnomorpha
- Genus: †Arquatichthys
- Species: †A. porosus

Binomial name
- †Arquatichthys porosus Lu and Zhu, 2008

Extinct genus of bony fishes

Arquatichthys is an extinct genus of dipnomorph fish that lived during the Pragian stage of the Early Devonian epoch.

== Distribution ==
Arquatichthys porosus, the type species, is known from the Posongchong Formation of Yunnan, China.
