= 1824 in paleontology =

Paleontology or palaeontology is the study of prehistoric life forms on Earth through the examination of plant and animal fossils. This includes the study of body fossils, tracks (ichnites), burrows, cast-off parts, fossilised feces (coprolites), palynomorphs and chemical residues. Because humans have encountered fossils for millennia, paleontology has a long history both before and after becoming formalized as a science. This article records significant discoveries and events related to paleontology that occurred or were published in the year 1824.

== Dinosaurs ==
- William Buckland realizes that fossils he previously believed to be of cetacean origin were actually Iguanodon fossils. This mistake cost him the chance to describe the genus himself.

=== New taxa ===
Taxon	Novelty	Status	Author(s)	Age	Unit	Location	Notes	Images
"Iguanosaurus"	Gen. nov.	Nomen nudum	Anonymous	Barremian, 126-125 mya	Unknown	England	"Iguanosaurus" was first mentioned in a magazine article by an anonymous author (possibly Mantell) in 1824. The author suggested that Mantell was originally going to name the teeth "Iguanosaurus", but William Daniel Conybeare suggested that it be instead named Iguanodon.	
Megalosaurus	Gen. nov.	Valid	Buckland	Bathonian, 166 mya	Taynton Limestone Formation	England	The Reverend William Buckland gives a presentation to the Geological Society describing the first scientifically named dinosaur, Megalosaurus on February 20. Later that year its formal scientific description is published in writing.	

== Pterosaurs ==
=== New taxa ===
Taxon	Novelty	Status	Author(s)	Age	Unit	Location	Notes	Images
Pterodactylus grandis	Sp. nov.	Nomen dubium	Cuvier	Kimmeridgian	Solnhofen limestone	Germany		

== Plesiosaurs ==
=== New taxa ===
Taxon	Novelty	Status	Author(s)	Age	Unit	Location	Notes	Images
Plesiosaurus dolichodeirus	Sp. nov.	Valid	Conybeare	Sinemurian, 199 mya	Blue Lias	England	Henry De la Beche and Conybeare named the genus in 1821, following up with the type species P. dolichodeirus in 1824. The species was named on the basis of a complete skeleton discovered by Mary Anning.	

== Pterosaurs ==
- Cuvier reiterated his previous conclusions that Pterodactylus was a reptile that flew with membranous wings. He also advanced novel speculations about its paleobiology, like that it used the claws on its wings to climb trees and "crawled" quadrupedally when not in flight rather than walking on its hind limbs.
