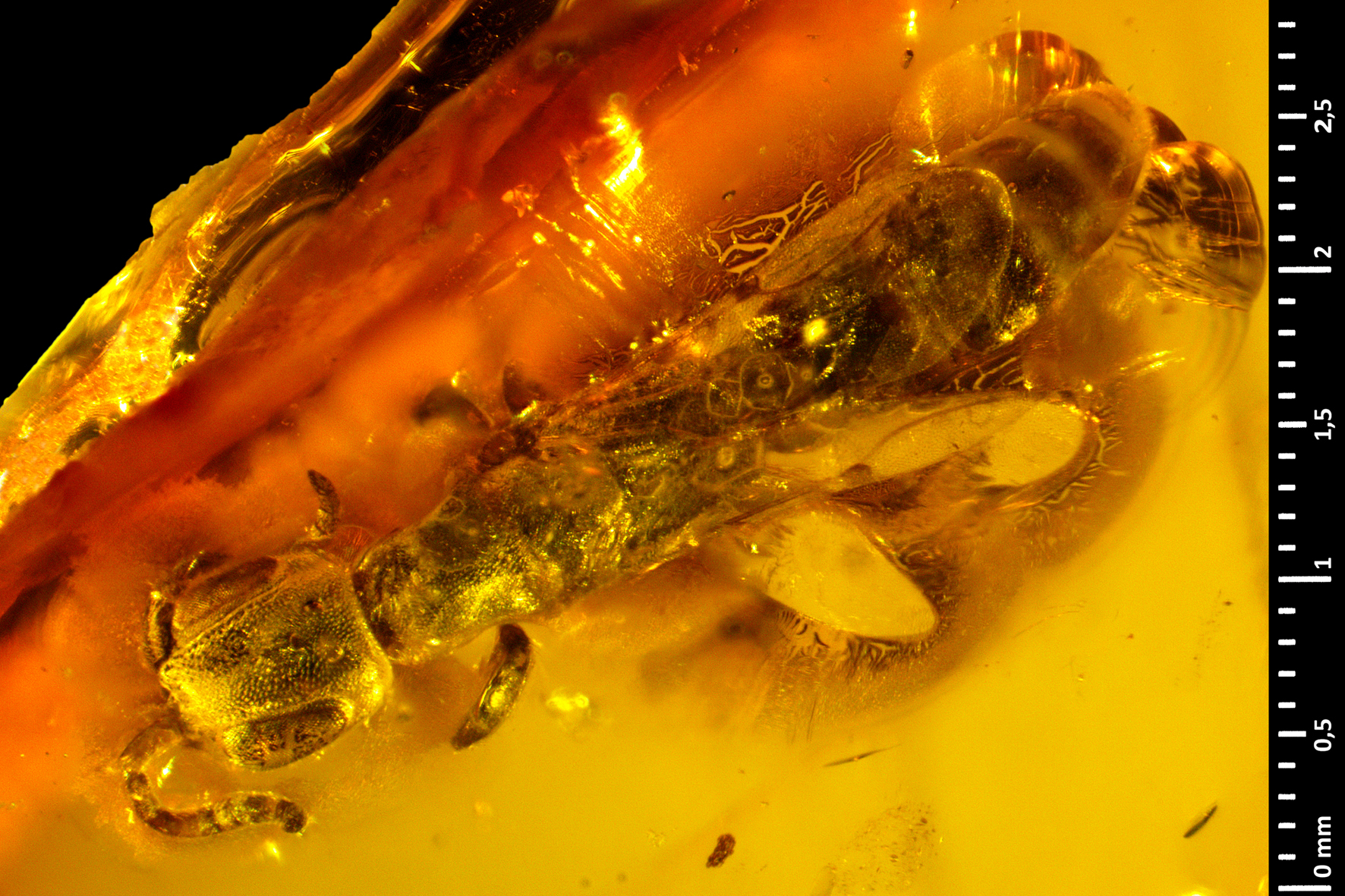

Scientific classification
- Kingdom: Animalia
- Phylum: Arthropoda
- Class: Insecta
- Order: Hymenoptera
- Family: Bethylidae
- Subfamily: Epyrinae
- Genus: †Elektroepyris; Perrichot & Nel, 2008
- Species: †E. magnificus

Binomial name
- †Elektroepyris magnificus Perrichot & Nel, 2008

= Elektroepyris =

Elektroepyris Temporal range: 55.8–48.6 Ma

Extinct genus of wasps

Elektroepyris is an extinct genus of wasp within the family Bethylidae containing a single species, Elektroepyris magnificus. It lived in the lower Eocene, with the type locality being from the Oise amber, Houdancourt located in France.
