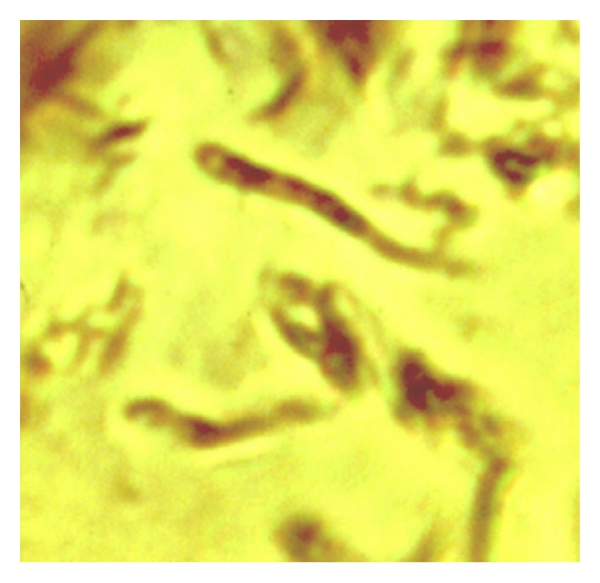
- Paleolishmania proterus in the gut of the Cretaceous sand fly Palaeomyia burmitis

Scientific classification
- Domain: Eukaryota
- Phylum: Euglenozoa
- Class: Kinetoplastea
- Order: Trypanosomatida
- Family: Trypanosomatidae
- Genus: †Paleoleishmania; Poinar & Poinar 2004

Type species
- Paleoleishmania proterus Poinar & Poinar 2004

Species
- †P. neotropicum Poinar 2008; †P. proterus Poinar & Poinar 2004

= Paleoleishmania =

Paleoleishmania Temporal range: Albian–Burdigalian

Extinct genus of parasitic flagellate protist in the Kinetoplastea class

Paleoleishmania is an extinct genus of kinetoplastids, a monophyletic group of unicellular parasitic flagellate protozoa. At present it is placed in the family Trypanosomatidae. The genus contains two species, the type species Paleoleishmania proterus and the later described Paleoleishmania neotropicum.

The genus is known from the Albian aged Burmese amber deposits of northern Myanmar and the Burdigalian aged Dominican amber deposits on the island of Hispaniola.

== Etymology ==
The genus name Paleoleishmania is derived from the Greek paleo meaning "old" and leishmania referencing the modern Leishmaniasis-causing genus Leishmania. All trypanosomes are heteroxenous (requiring more than one obligatory host in order to complete life cycle) or are transmitted through some variation of a vector.

== Paleoleishmania proterus ==
The genus was described in 2004 by George Poinar Jr. and Robert Poinar in the journal Protist from amastigotes, promastigotes and paramastigotes preserved with a blood engorged female Palaeomyia burmitis sandfly preserved in Burmese amber. The species was named Paleoleishmania proterus and the genus was erected for fossil digenetic trypanosomes. P. proterus was the first kinetoplastid to be described from the fossil record.

== Paleoleishmania neotropicum ==
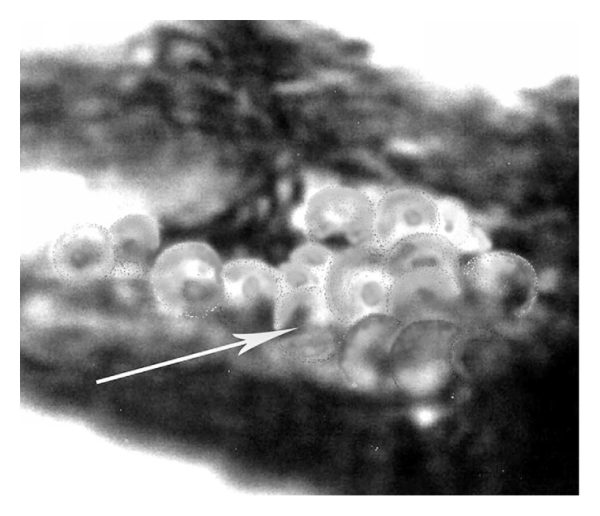
P. neotropicum amastigotes in proboscis of Lutzomyia adiketis

Paleoleishmania neotropicum is known solely from the holotype specimen, number # P-3–5, amastigotes and paramastigotes associated with the species host, a relatively complete female sandfly of the species Lutzomyia adiketis. P. neotropicum and L. adiketis are preserved in a polished piece of amber 18 by 12 millimetres (0.71 by 0.47 in) and 2 millimetres (0.079 in) thick. The amber specimen is currently residing in the Poinar Amber Collection housed at the Oregon State University in Corvallis, Oregon. Poinar published his 2008 type description in the journal Parasites & Vectors. During the fly's struggle to escape from the resin, the alimentary tract was ruptured and some P. neotropicum flagellates leaked from there into the hemocoel. P. neotropicum and L. adiketis lived in an environment similar to modern moist tropical rain forests.

The morphology of the compact kinetoplast, nucleus, and rear-facing flagellum indicate the species belongs in the family Trypanosomatidae. The preserved amastigotes are between 4 and 7 μm and their presence in the fly indicates the digenetic nature of the species. That the species is digenetic excludes the Blastocrithidia as a possible genus placement for the species, while Endotrypanum is specific to sloths which are not known on Hispaniola past the Quaternary. The genus Phytomonas is excluded due to it being exclusively found in hemipterans. The paramastigotes range in size from 6 to 10 μm which is within the range for modern Leishmania species. There are several possible origins for the paramastigotes preserved in the proboscis. They probably developed within the proboscis from an earlier meal of the fly, however they may have been "infective promastigotes" which occur naturally in the mouthparts of some Lutzomyia species. Though they are currently placed in the same genus, Dr. Poinar notes the likelihood that the two species arose interdependently from each other. It is possible P. neotropicum is the ancestor of one or more Neotropical Leishmania clades.
