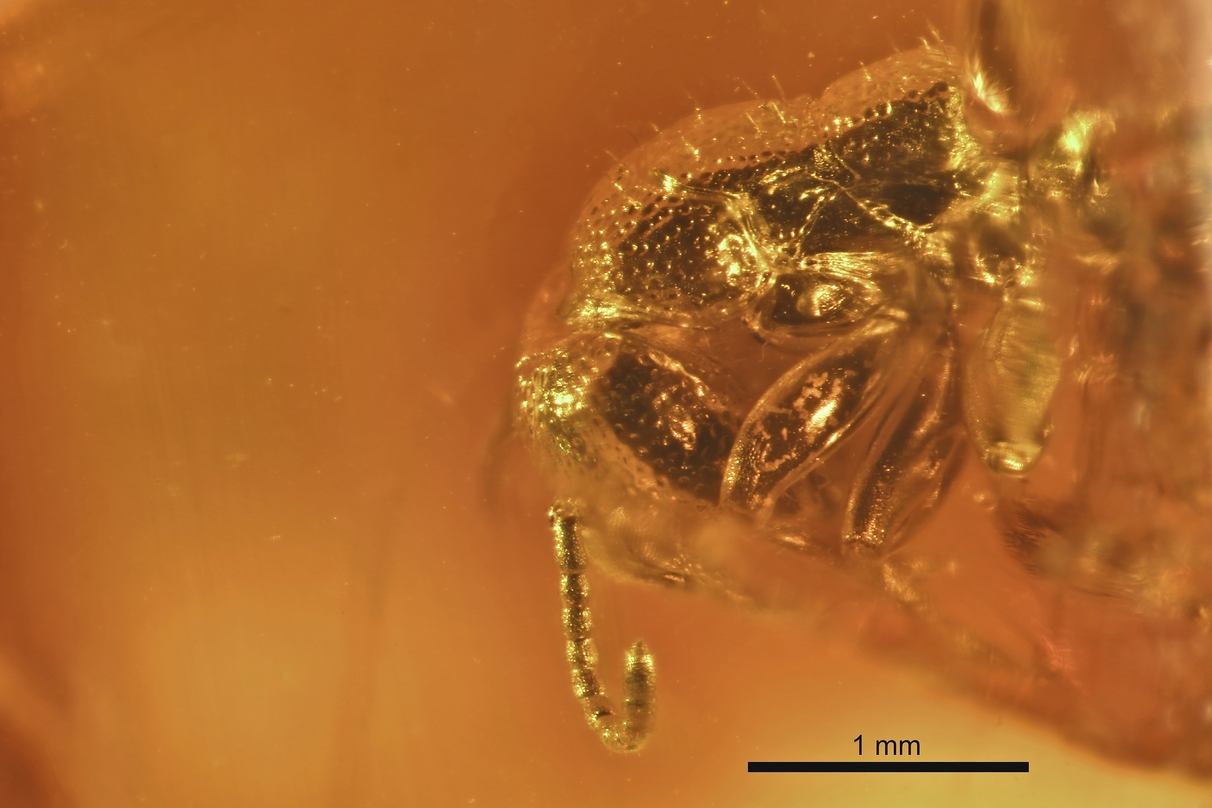
- holotype in Baltic amber

Scientific classification
- Domain: Eukaryota
- Kingdom: Animalia
- Phylum: Arthropoda
- Class: Insecta
- Order: Hymenoptera
- Family: Formicidae
- Subfamily: Dolichoderinae
- Genus: Dolichoderus
- Species: †D. punctatus

Binomial name
- †Dolichoderus punctatus Dlussky, 2008

= Dolichoderus punctatus =

Dolichoderus punctatus Temporal range: Middle to Late Eocene

Species of ant

Dolichoderus punctatus is an extinct species of Eocene ant in the genus Dolichoderus. Described by Dlussky in 2008, fossils of the species were found in the Baltic Amber.
