= Donnrosenia =

Donnrosenia Temporal range: Givetian

Scientific classification
- Kingdom: Animalia
- Phylum: Chordata
- Class: Actinopterygii
- Genus: †Donnrosenia
- Species: †D. schaefferi

Binomial name
- †Donnrosenia schaefferi Long et al., 2008

Extinct genus of basal actinopterygian

Donnrosenia is an extinct monotypic genus of basal ray-finned fish that lived in what is now Antarctica during the Givetian stage of the Middle Devonian epoch.

== Taxonomy ==
Phylogenetic analysis indicates that Donnrosenia is the sister taxon to Howqualepis, known from fossils from Victoria, Australia.
