= Montrichardia aquatica =

Montrichardia aquatica Temporal range: Middle to Late Paleocene ~60–58 Ma

Scientific classification
- Kingdom: Plantae
- Clade: Tracheophytes
- Clade: Angiosperms
- Clade: Monocots
- Order: Alismatales
- Family: Araceae
- Genus: Montrichardia
- Species: M. aquatica

Binomial name
- Montrichardia aquatica Herrera et al. 2008

Extinct species of flowering plant

Montrichardia aquatica is an extinct species of monocot plant in the family Araceae. M. aquatica is related to the living species M. arborescens and M. linifera. The species is solely known from the Middle to Late Paleocene (about 60 to 58 Ma), fossil-rich Cerrejón Formation in La Guajira, northern Colombia.

== History and classification ==
The species is known only from the holotype specimen, number ING-0904, and the four paratypes ING-0808, ING-0903, ING-0905 and ING-0906. The leaves are currently residing in the collections housed by the Colombian Geological Institute in Bogotá. All five fossil specimens were collected from Cerrejón Formation exposures in the Cerrejón coal mine, located in the Rancheria Basin, Colombia. They were first studied by a group of researchers from Florida Museum of Natural History, the Smithsonian Museum of Natural History and led by Fabiany Herrera from the Smithsonian Tropical Research Institute. Herrera and associates published their 2008 type description in the American Journal of Botany. The specific epithet "aquatica", a derivation of the Latin "aquaticus", was chosen by the authors in reference to the species having lived near to, or in water.

== Description ==
There are two angiosperm families, Nymphaeaceae and Nelumbonaceae which have leaf shapes very similar to Montrichardia aquatica. Though the overall shape of leaves in those families may be similar the vein structure in M. aquatica is notably distinct from both. Neither family possesses the collective veins along the margin, naked secondary veins along the basal margin, and the distinct higher vein structure that is present in the fossil specimens of M. aquatica. This combination of features is found within the family Araceae. M. aquatica is placed within the living Araceae genus Montrichardia due to the unique combination of leaf morphology characters present in the fossils. Though the fossils are generally similar to the fossil genus Caladiosoma the vein structure is very dissimilar and thus is not considered a close relation. Overall, the species possesses entire margined leaves with a generally ovate shape. The leaf apex is short and rounded, while the base is heart to arrowhead shaped. Each of the basal lobes is supplied by a secondary vein which forms part of the margin and forks several times. The overall size of the leaves reached up to 56 by 26 centimetres (22 by 10 in).

Several depositional environments, at an estimated paleolatitude of 5 degrees North, appeared to have hosted M. aquatica. The holotype specimen was recovered from a sandstone that probably was an overbank deposits of a fluvial environment. The paratype specimens were recovered from gray siltstones underlying one of the thickest coal sequences in the Cerrejón Formation. These layers are most likely from a swampy to lake like environment.
