= Maria Farinha Formation =

Geological formation in northeastern Brazil

- Stratigraphic range: Danian (Tiupampan); ~66–61 Ma
- Type: Geological formation
- Underlies: Tambaba Formation
- Overlies: Gramame Formation
- Thickness: 14 m (46 ft)

Lithology
- Primary: Limestone
- Other: Dolomite, marly & sandy limestone

Location
- Coordinates: 7.9°S 34.9°W
- Approximate paleocoordinates: 11.8°S 20.9°W
- Region: Pernambuco State
- Country: Brazil
- Extent: Parnaíba Basin
- Maria Farinha Formation (Brazil)

The Maria Farinha Formation is a geological formation of the Parnaíba Basin in Pernambuco, northeastern Brazil whose strata date back to the Danian stage of the Paleocene, or Tiupampan in the SALMA classification.

The formation comprising limestones, dolomites, marly and sandy limestones has been deposited in a shallow marine platform environment.

The formation has provided fossils of reptiles and fish.

== Description ==
The Maria Farinha Formation crops out in the Parnaíba Basin in the northeastern state of Pernambuco of Brazil. The formation registers the Cretaceous-Paleogene boundary at the base of the formation, where it overlies the Maastrichtian Gramame Formation. The 14 metres (46 ft) thick formation is overlain by the Eocene Tambaba Formation which is overlain by the Plio-Pleistocene Barreiras Formation.

== Fossil content ==
The following fossils were reported from the formation:

- Reptiles
  - Turtles
    - Inaechelys pernambucensis
  - Tethysuchians
    - Guarinisuchus munizi
    - Hyposaurus derbianus
    - Dyrosauridae indet.
- Fish
  - Chondrichthyes
    - Apocopodon sericeus
    - Cretolamna appendiculata
    - C. biauriculata
    - C. serrata
    - Hexanchus microdon
    - Myliobatis dixoni
    - Rhinoptera prisca
    - R. studeri
    - Squalicorax kaupi
    - S. pristodontus
    - Synodonstaspis sp.

== See also ==
- South American land mammal ages
- Guabirotuba Formation, Late Eocene formation of the Curitiba Basin
- Itaboraí Formation, Early Eocene formation of the Itaboraí Basin
- Lefipán Formation, Danian formation of Argentina
- Santa Lucía Formation, Tiupampan type formation of Bolivia
