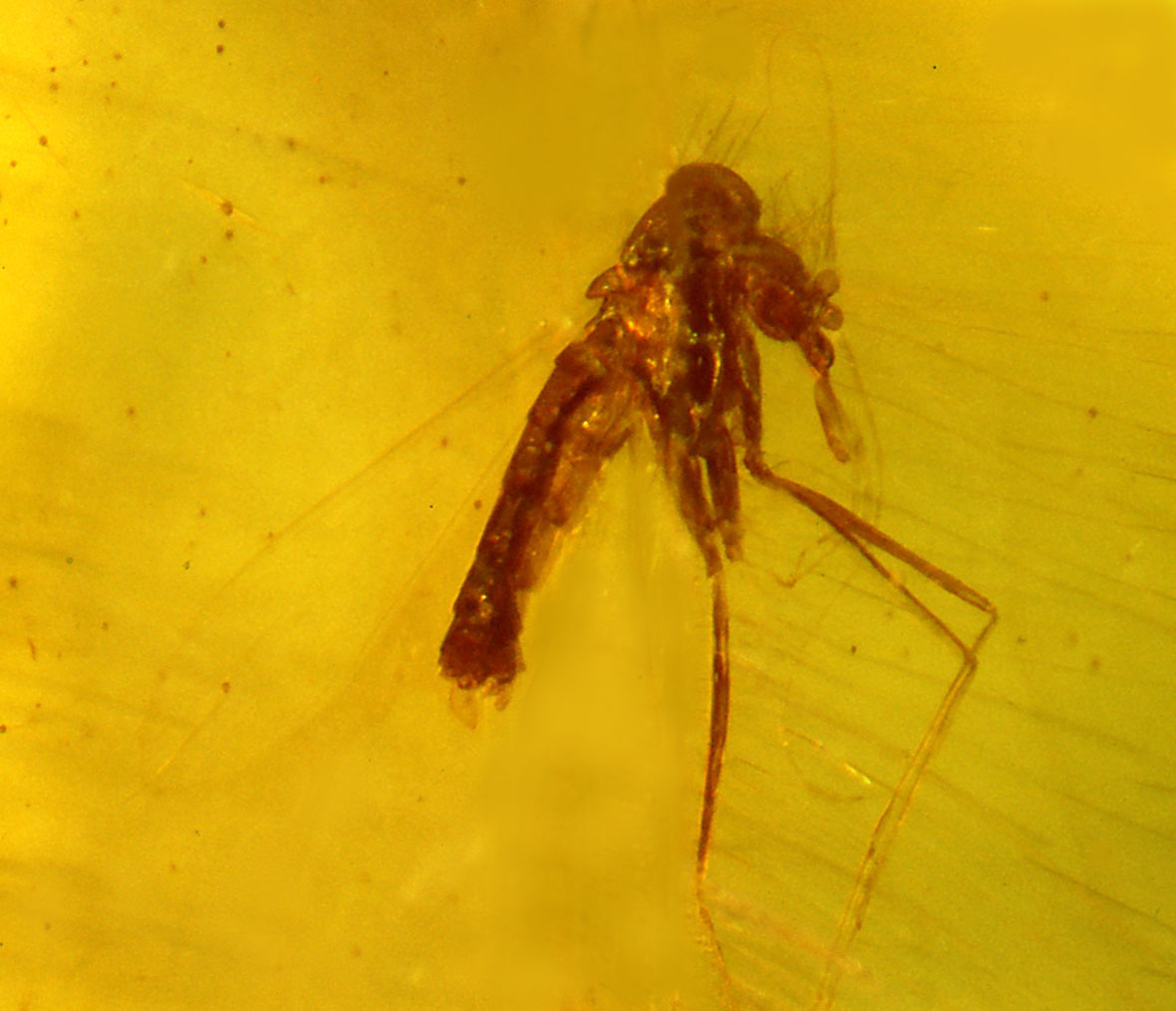
- Habitus of Lutzomyia adiketis. Bar = 240 μm.

Scientific classification
- Kingdom: Animalia
- Phylum: Arthropoda
- Clade: Pancrustacea
- Class: Insecta
- Order: Diptera
- Family: Psychodidae
- Genus: Lutzomyia
- Species: †L. adiketis

Binomial name
- †Lutzomyia adiketis Poinar, 2008

= Lutzomyia adiketis =

Lutzomyia adiketis Temporal range: Burdigalian

Extinct species of fly

Lutzomyia adiketis is an extinct species of sandfly in the moth fly subfamily Phlebotominae. L. adiketis is a vector of the extinct Paleoleishmania neotropicum and both species are solely known from early Miocene Burdigalian stage Dominican amber deposits on the island of Hispaniola.

== History and classification ==
The species is known solely from the holotype specimen, number # P-3–5, a complete female fly. The specimen is currently residing in the Poinar Amber Collection housed at the Oregon State University in Corvallis, Oregon. The specimen was collected from an unidentified amber mine in the Cordillera Septentrional between Puerto Plata and Santiago de los Caballeros. The specimen was first studied by noted amber researcher George Poinar Jr., from Oregon State University. Poinar published his 2008 type description in the journal Parasites & Vectors. The specific epithet "adiketis" was coined by the author as a derivation from the Greek word ἄδικος (adikos), meaning "injurious".

== Description ==
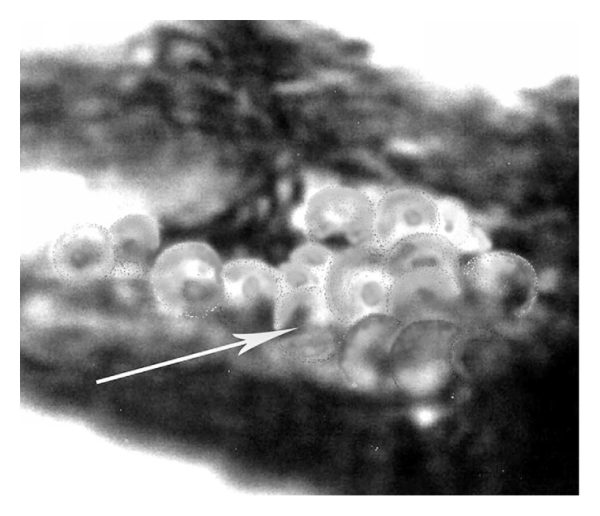
Paleoleishmania neotropicum amastigotes in proboscis of L. adiketis

A number of features in the female fly indicate its placement in the moth fly subfamily Phlebotominae. The specimen lacks an eye bridge and has antenna segments, flagellomeres, with a fusiform shape. The wing venation includes a four branched Rs vein and two longitudinal veins present between the radial and medial forks. Though a number of characters are similar to both the Lutzomyia subgenera Lutzomyia and Pintomyia, it lacks the diagnostic row of spines that are found on the femur in Pintomyia species. As a result, Dr. Poinar tentatively placed the species into subgenus Lutzomyia. The total length of the body is 1.3 millimetres (0.051 in) with an overall brown coloration to the body antenna, and legs. The specimen is missing the left hind leg and both middle legs along with most of the antenna hairs and many body hairs. Portions of the legs and many of the hairs are preserved behind the fly in the amber. This placement suggests that the fly struggled to free itself from the resin when first trapped. Found preserved in the proboscis and alimentary tract of the fly were hundreds of trypanosomatid parasites of the species Paleoleishmania neotropicum. During the struggle the fly ruptured her alimentary tract, which allowed some of the flagellates in the gut to leak into the hemocoel. The species P. neotropicum described from these fossils is the second known occurrence for this parasitic genus.

The Dominican amber species Pintomyia paleotownsendi and P. falcaorum have a Sc vein that is free. The Sc meets the costa vein in P. paleotrichia. In contrast P. brazilorum, P. killickorum, Lutzomyia filipalpis, L. miocena, L. paleopestis, L. schleei, and L. succini all possess an Sc which meets the R_{1} vein. The presence of a forked Sc vein in the wings, found in some Lutzomyia species including Lutzomyia adiketis, is unique among the described species of sandflies from Dominican amber. Living members of the Phlebotominae suck blood from vertebrates, and L. adiketis is presumed to have done so as well. However, the host(s) of this species has not been identified at this time.

The Dominican Republic is now home to only two living species of Lutzomyia, L. cayennensis hispaniolae and L. christophei and both species are placed in the Verrucarum species group. none of the described Verrucarum group species possess the forked Sc vein that distinguishes L. adiketis from the modern species.
