= Oise amber =

Type of amber found in France

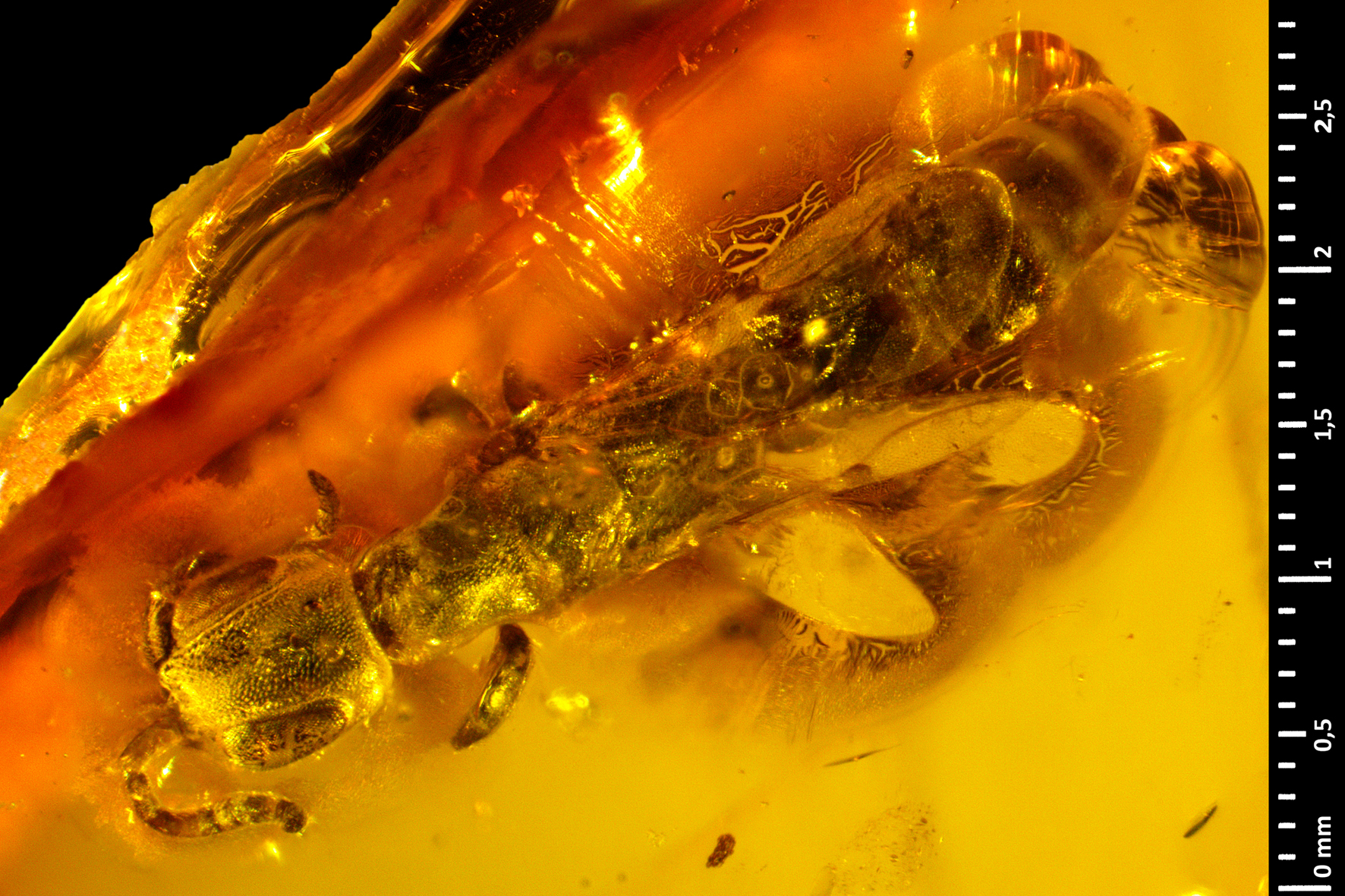
The Elektroepyris magnificus holotype, dorsal view in Oise amber

Oise amber (French: [waz]) is a type of amber found near the Oise river near Creil in northern France. Oise amber is around 53 million years old, dating to the Early Eocene (Ypresian). Oise amber is softer than Baltic amber, although Oise amber is older and both types of amber have similar geographic origins. The formation is known for preserving a diverse fauna of invertebrates.

== History ==
In the late 1990s, an amber deposit was discovered by French entomologist Gaël de Ploëg near Creil at Le Quesnoy, close to the Oise river in France. The sediments containing the amber were found at the bottom of quarries used for sand and gravel extraction. The Oise amber deposit had more than 20,000 arthropod inclusions to date. In 2000, pollen was extracted for the first time from Oise amber. Using nuclear magnetic resonance spectroscopy, it was then discovered that the amber contained a unique compound, quesnoin, which was similar to fresh resin from a modern tree found in the Amazon, Hymenaea oblongifolia, suggesting that the amber may have been produced by related trees.

== Geology ==
The amber originates from the Argiles d'lignite du Soissonnais, which forms part of the stratigraphy of the Paris Basin. The strata form channels cutting into the underlying marine deposited Late Paleocene (Thanetian) aged greensand. The main lithologies of the beds are lenticular bedded bodies consisting of clay rich sand. These are divided into two subfacies, the first of which contains pyrite-rich lignite, as well as amber, the other contains proportionally less lignite, as well as remains of terrestrial vertebrates. The deposit also contains the remains of many coprolites.

== Description ==
Oise amber tends to be a very clear yellow, and pieces of Oise amber are usually a few centimetres long. In every flow of Oise amber, there is usually at least one inclusion. The amber is of angiosperm origin, with the source tree dubbed Aulacoxylon sparnacense, which is thought to be a member of Fabaceae.

== Diversity ==
The amber shows a high diversity of invertebrate fauna. The most diverse group of insects are Coleoptera (beetles) and Psocoptera, representing 21% each of collected insect specimens as of 2009, followed by Hymenoptera at 16%, Diptera (flies) at 12% and Hemiptera at 10%. However, Oise amber as of 2010 has fewer described species than Baltic, Dominican or New Jersey ambers.
