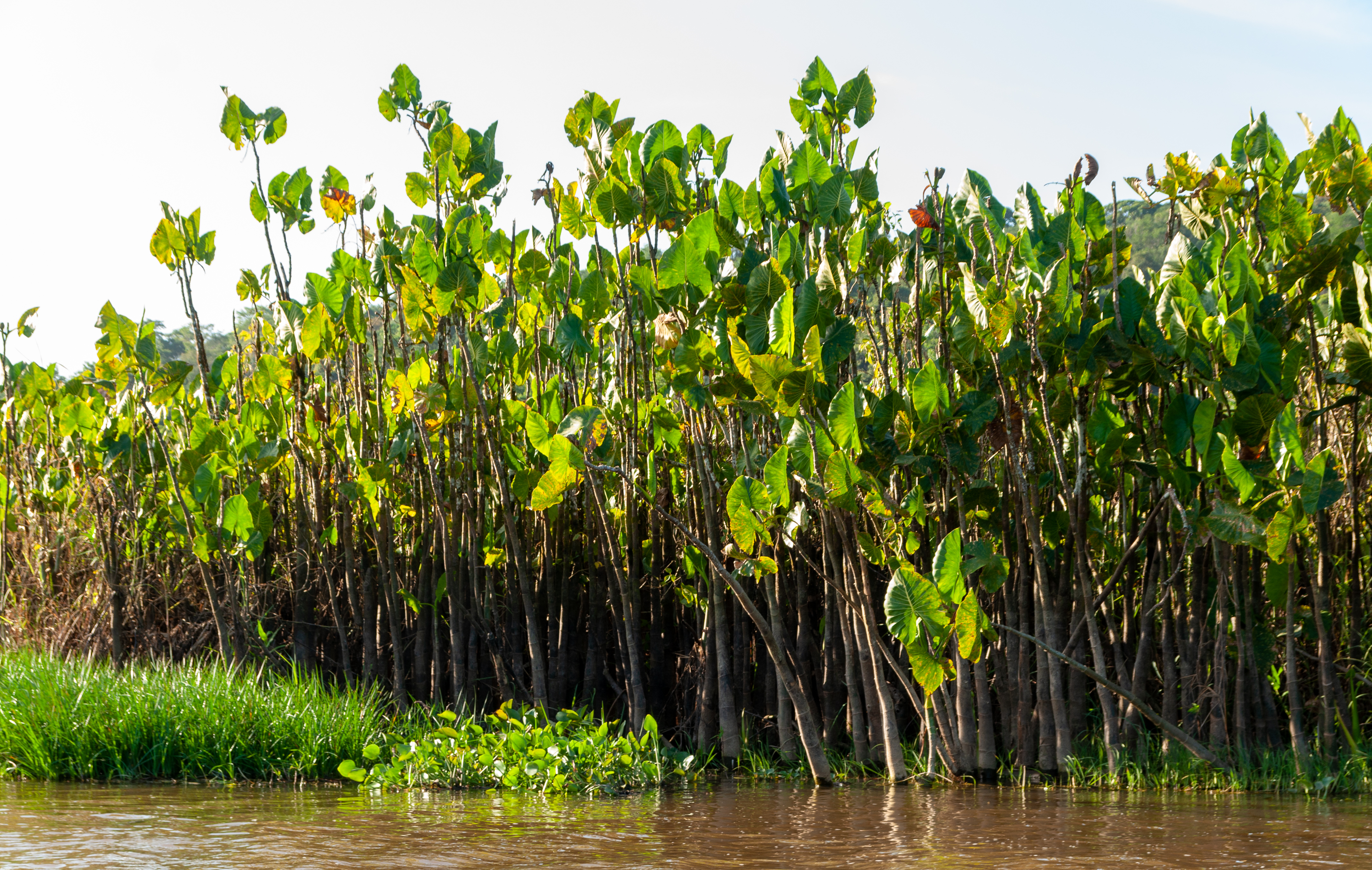
- Montrichardia arborescens at Kaw-Roura Marshland Nature Reserve, French Guiana

Scientific classification
- Kingdom: Plantae
- Clade: Embryophytes
- Clade: Tracheophytes
- Clade: Angiosperms
- Clade: Monocots
- Order: Alismatales
- Family: Araceae
- Genus: Montrichardia
- Species: M. arborescens

Binomial name
- Montrichardia arborescens (Schott)

Synonyms
- Arum arborescens L.; Caladium arborescens (L.) Vent; Pleurospa reticulata Raf.; Philodendron arborescens (L.) Kunth; Caladium arboreum Kunth; Arum aculeatum (G.Mey.) Steud.; Philodendron arboreum (Kunth) Kunth; Montrichardia aculeatum (G.Mey.) Crueg; Montrichardia arborea (Kunth) Schott; Montrichardia fendleri Schott; Montrichardia splitgerberi Schott; Montrichardia arborescens var. aculeata (G.Mey.) Engl.

= Montrichardia arborescens =

Species of flowering plant

Montrichardia arborescens, the yautia madera, or moco-moco, is a tropical plant growing along river banks, swamps, or creeks. They consist of arrow shaped leaves that are food sources for some animal species. The plant produces inflorescences which then leave a fruit of Montrichardia arborescens which is edible and can be cooked. Its fruiting spadices produces large infructescences, which contain about 80 edible yellow fruit.

== Distribution ==
Montrichardia arborescens is most commonly found in South America in areas of the Caribbean and Mesoamerica including Puerto Rico, Panama, Guyana, Suriname, Venezuela, Brazil, Colombia, and more. Montrichardia arborescens is native to the tropical Americas and the West Indies.

== Habitat and ecology ==
Montrichardia arborescens is a perennial aquatic shrub that grows most commonly in a bay, mangrove habitat. They most suitably grow along the banks of rivers, creeks and in swamps. They also grow in salt water, brackish water, and fresh water. M. arborescens usually live a short viable life and can not withstand low temperatures. They grow best with full sun or in partial shade and can withstand most types of soil. As with many Araceae they basically need lots of water but they do have some drought tolerance. This species is often cultivated in or besides ponds because they form unusual and impressive stands. The geophytic tropical Araceae are seldom cultivated in gardens because they require more constant care.

== Morphology ==
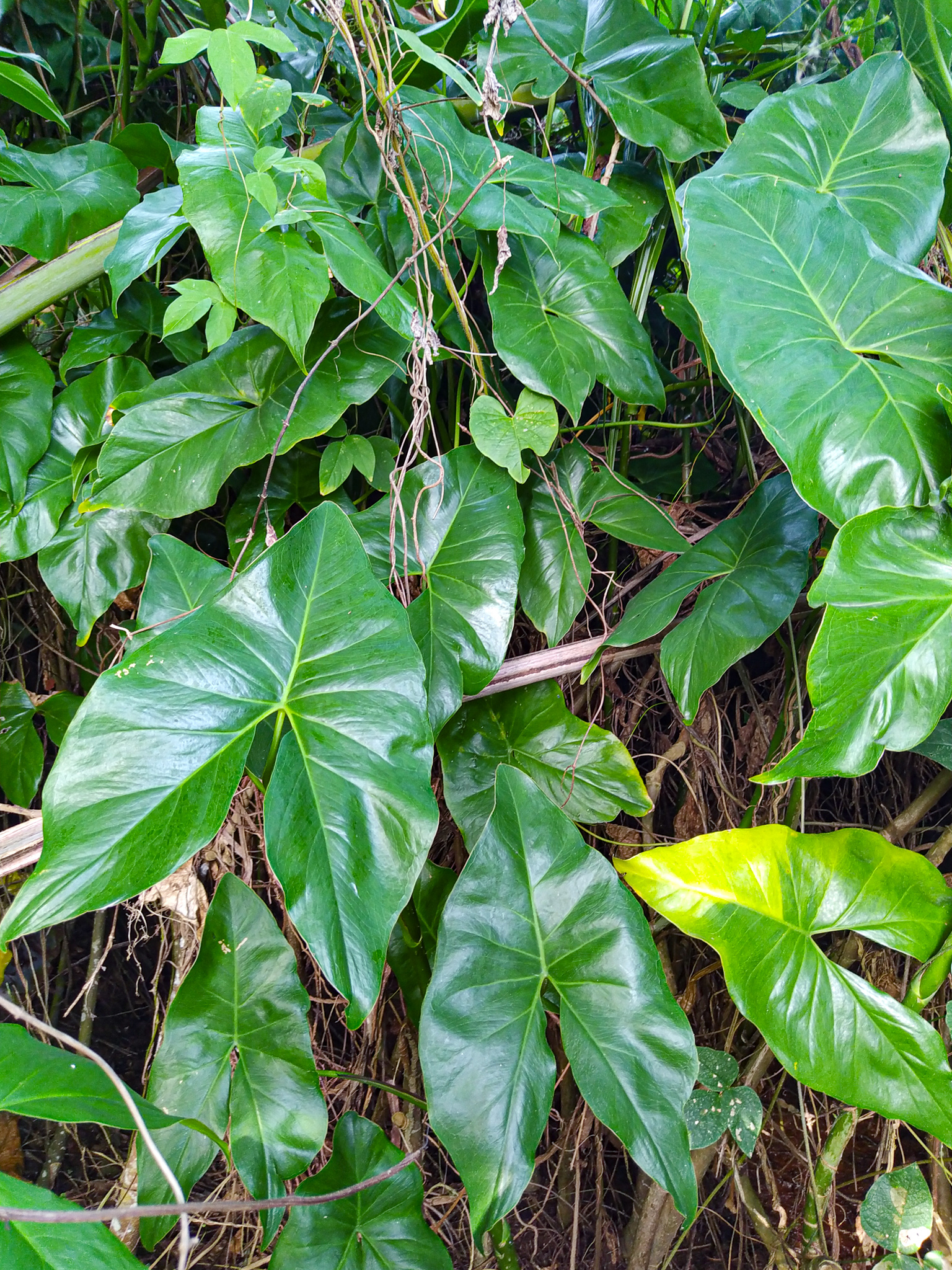
Foliage

The plant usually stems to 3 m, occasionally to 7 m. and is often swollen at base. It can grow up to 25 cm in diameter and sometimes with short prickles. The leaf stalks can grow up to 30 cm long, and the blades can range 10–30 cm with a distinct triangular outline except for lobes at base. The spadix of Montrichardia arborescens is cylindrical or ellipsoid that forms at maturity. Seeds of M. arborescens usually float to shore and germinate.

== Flowers and fruit ==
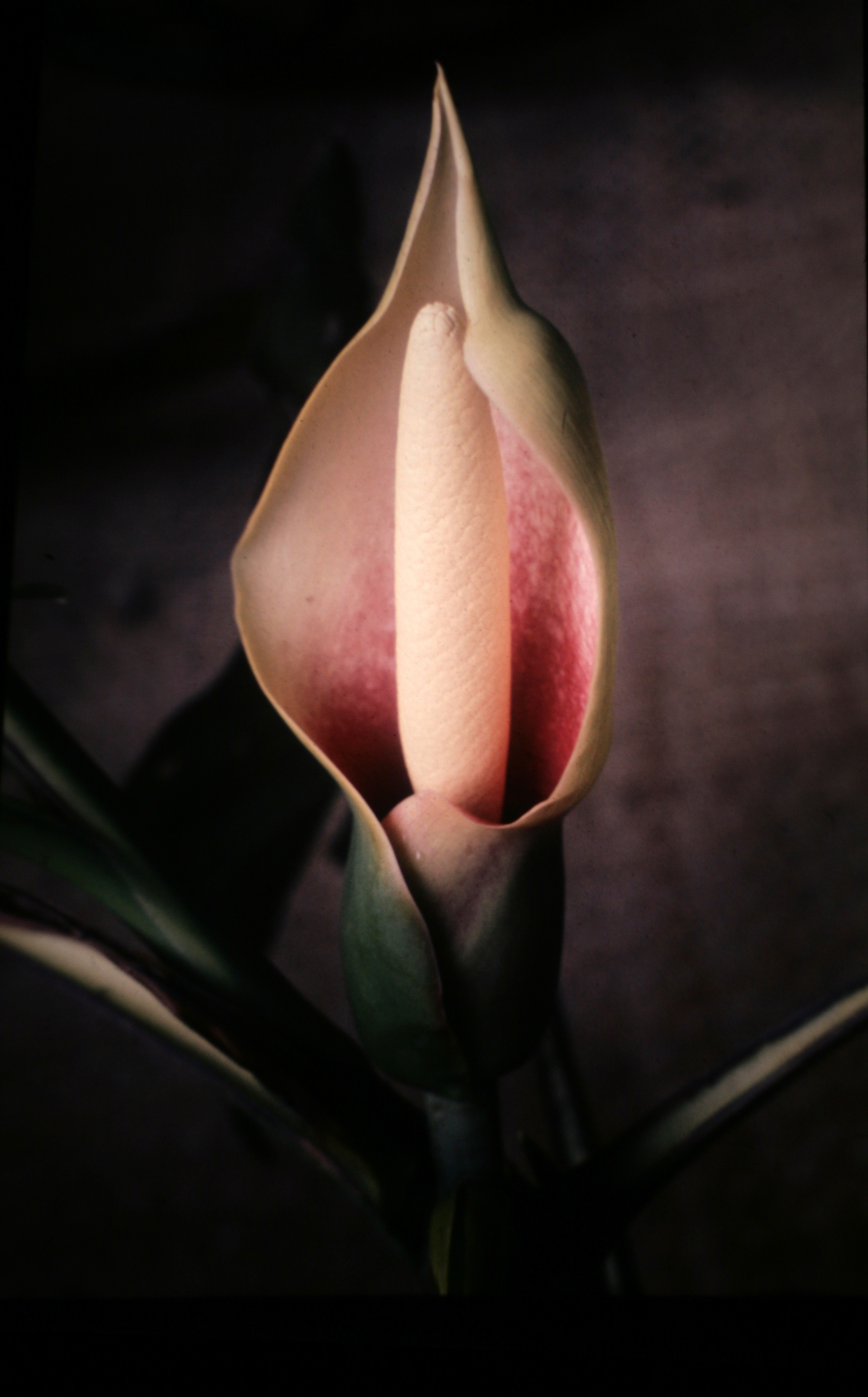
Inflorescence, Suriname

Flowers of M. arborescens, consist of a spadix (typical to the family Araceae) which is a type of spike inflorescence having small flowers borne on a fleshy stem. The spadix of contains uni-sexual flowers without a perianth. The pistillate flowers are located in the base portion of the inflorescence, and the staminate flowers are located in the apical portion. In the zone between male flowers and female flowers there are also vestigial flowers. In a study done by M. Weber and H. Halbritter to examine M. arborescens pollen, their findings indicated that there is rapid pollen tube formation. The ultra structure of the pollen protoplast was characterized by many mitochondria, ER strands, dictyosomes, and microtubules. It seemed that the walnut size seeds need quick germination since the wall is missing and thus a protective coating around the easily damaged pollen protoplast is absent. Further studies are needed to clarify how the pollen wall and pollen tube are formed. The representative molecular barcode of Montrichardia arborescens can be found at the Encyclopedia of life page.

== Usage ==
=== Food ===
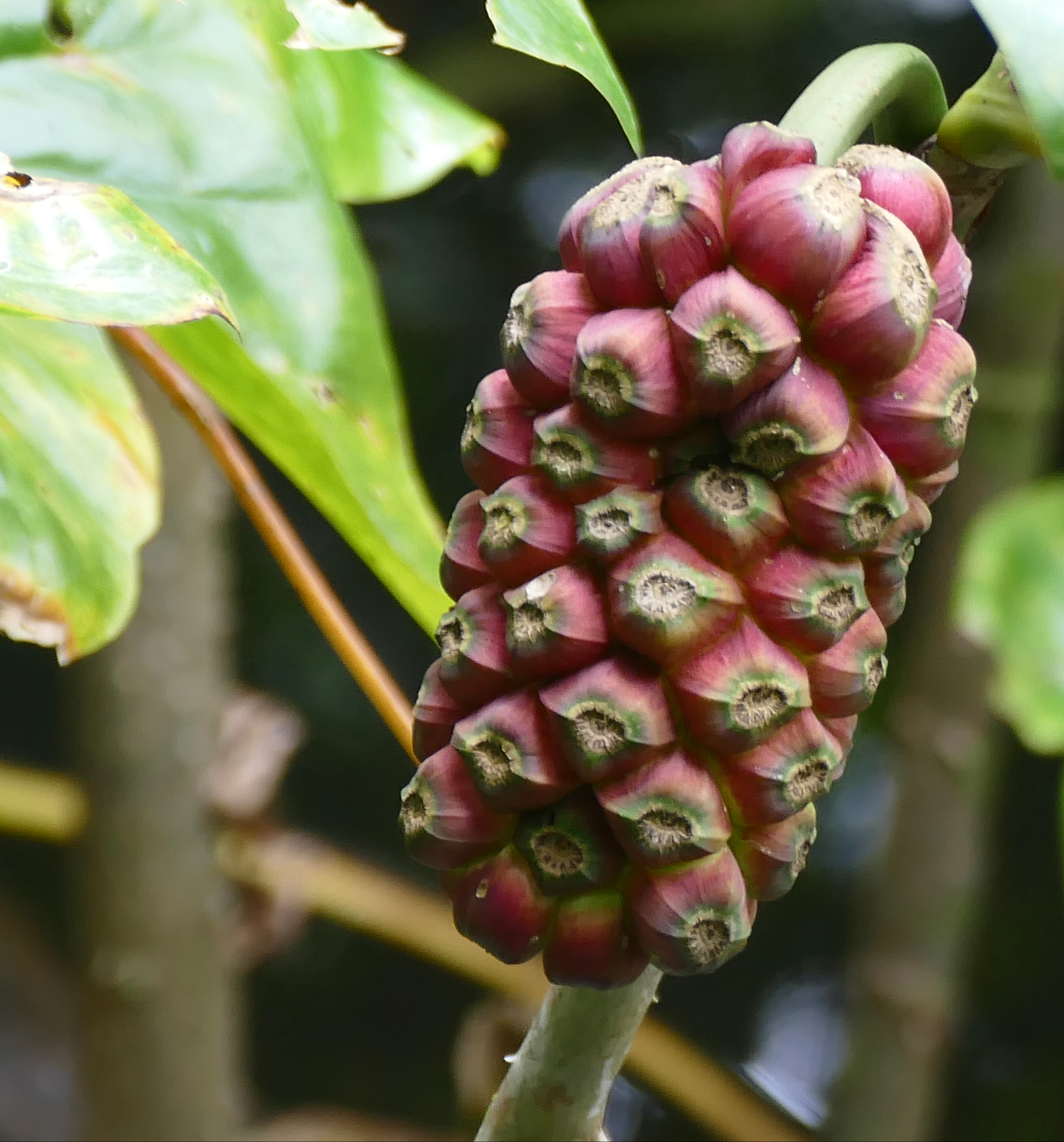
Fruiting spadix

The fruiting spadix of Montrichardia arborescens is edible. The seeds can be cooked or toasted. Aroids such as M. arborescens have long been a food staple to many tropical populations across the world. Aroids can provide high yielding nutritious crops which can be substances for specialist diets.

=== Medicinal ===
In Suriname, the milky juice of the stem is used in the treatment of deep external cuts. Its sap was first determined to be caustic and can cause dermatitis. It was later found that it can also be used against nose bleeds, sore eyes, and the sap can also be applied to ulcers in a poultice. Dried roots and leaves can also be taken to relieve hypertension and shoot juices for other shamanic practices.

=== Other usage ===
Montrichardia arborescens has other uses as well. The fibers in the stem can be used to make cords, the berries and fruit spikes can be used for fish bait, and the tissue in the stem can be used to make paper.

== Other common names ==
- Aninga
- Arracacho
- Arum lily
- Fruit of the devil
- Malanga-gratter
- Moco moco / Moko moko / Mokumoku / Mocou mocou / Mocca mocca
- Yautia-madera
