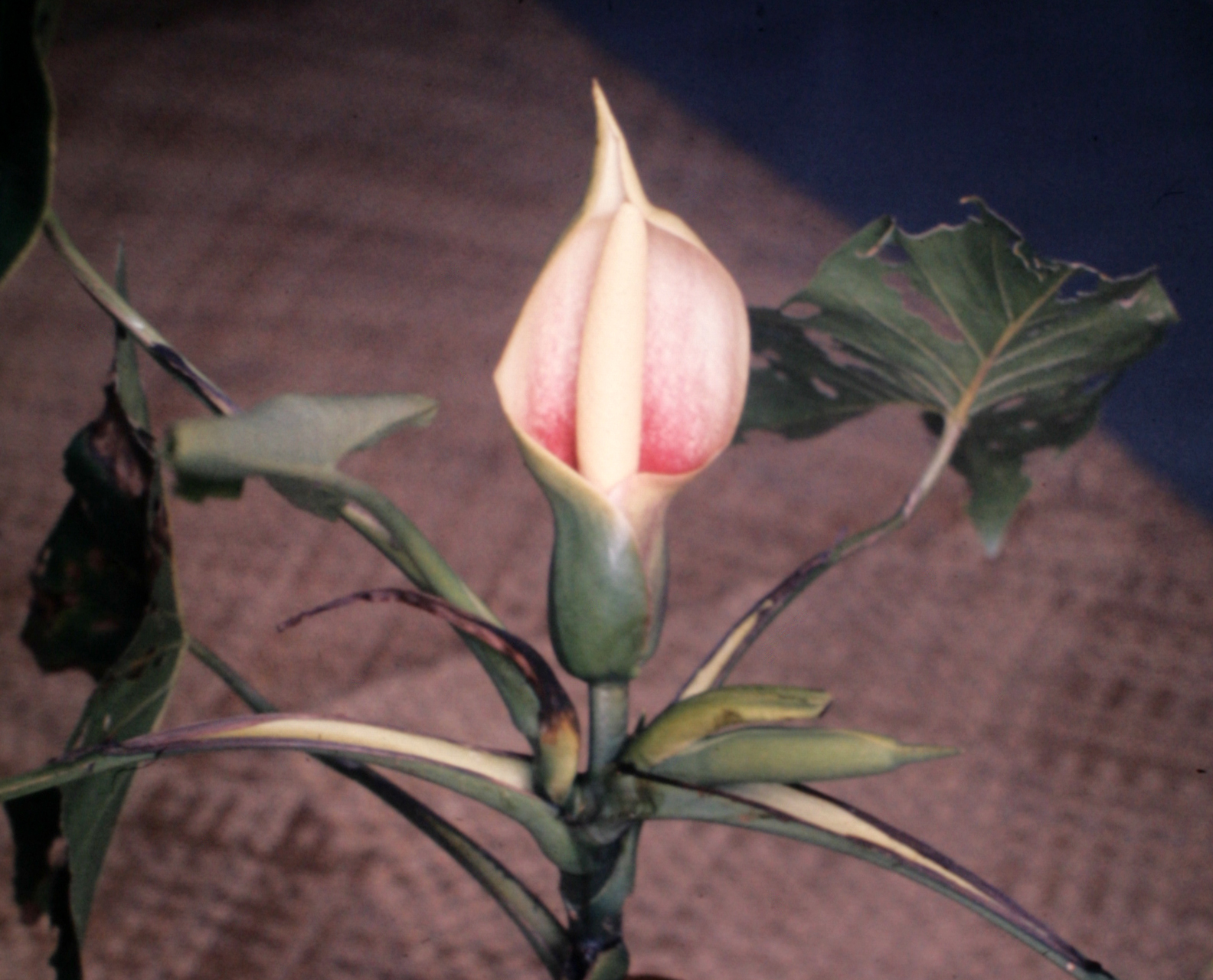
- Montrichardia arborescens

Scientific classification
- Kingdom: Plantae
- Clade: Tracheophytes
- Clade: Angiosperms
- Clade: Monocots
- Order: Alismatales
- Family: Araceae
- Subfamily: Aroideae
- Tribe: Montrichardieae
- Genus: Montrichardia; Crueg.

Species
- †Montrichardia aquatica; Montrichardia arborescens; Montrichardia linifera

Synonyms
- Pleurospa Raf.

= Montrichardia =

Montrichardia Temporal range: Paleocene to Recent 60–0 Ma

Genus of flowering plants

Montrichardia is a genus of flowering plants in the family Araceae. It contains two species, Montrichardia arborescens and Montrichardia linifera, and one extinct species Montrichardia aquatica. The genus is helophytic and distributed in tropical America (West Indies, Belize, Brazil, Colombia, Costa Rica, French Guiana, Guatemala, Guyana, Honduras, Nicaragua, Panama, Peru, Puerto Rico, Suriname, Trinidad, Tobago, and Venezuela). The extinct species M. aquatica is known from fossils found in a Neotropical rainforest environment preserved in the Paleocene Cerrejón Formation of Colombia. Living Montrichardia species have a diploid chromosome number of 2n=48.

== Species ==
Image	Scientific name	Common name	Distribution
	Montrichardia arborescens (L.) Schott	yautia madera, or moco-moco	West Indies, Belize, northwestern Brazil, Colombia, Costa Rica, French Guiana, Guatemala, Guyana, Honduras, Nicaragua, Panama, Peru, Puerto Rico, Suriname, Trinidad, Tobago, Venezuela
	Montrichardia linifera (Arruda) Schott	aninga	northern and eastern Brazil, Venezuela, Colombia, Ecuador, Peru, the Guianas

- †Montrichardia aquatica Herrera - Colombia in Paleocene

M. linifera and M. arborescens can be differentiated by the appearance of their stem, leaves and spathe, with M. linifera having a stem described as "bamboo-like, smooth or tuberculate (never aculeate)" and M. arborescens having a "moderately slender, prominently aculeate" stem, among other differences.
