= Hypolestidae =

Scientific classification
- Kingdom: Animalia
- Phylum: Arthropoda
- Clade: Pancrustacea
- Class: Insecta
- Order: Odonata
- Suborder: Zygoptera
- Superfamily: Polythoroidea
- Family: Hypolestidae; Tillyard & Fraser, 1938

Genus
- Hypolestes
- Distribution of Hypolestidae

Family of damselflies

Hypolestidae is a family of damselflies in the superfamily Polythoroidea, represented today by the Caribbean genus Hypolestes. Species of Hypolestes occur on islands of the Greater Antilles, where they inhabit streams and rivers in forested habitats.

Members of the family are medium-sized damselflies with clear wings that are held open at rest and dark bodies marked with pale yellow patterning. Mature males often develop a conspicuous pale grey pruinosity on the head and thorax.

Hypolestidae represents a distinctive evolutionary lineage of damselflies within the superfamily Polythoroidea. Although historically grouped with several other unusual genera from Asia, Australia and South America, modern phylogenetic studies recognise Hypolestes as a distinct family.

== Description ==
Hypolestids are medium-sized damselflies with clear wings and slender dark bodies marked with yellow patterning. Unlike many damselflies, they typically hold their wings open when at rest.

Mature males develop extensive pale grey pruinosity on the head, thorax and terminal abdominal segments. The larvae possess distinctive caudal appendages that are swollen at the base and terminate in long, pointed filaments.

== Taxonomic history ==
The family-group name originated as Hypolestinae, which was established in Fraser's 1938 publication of an unfinished manuscript by Robin Tillyard. In the preface, Fraser explained that the work had been left incomplete by Tillyard's death in 1937 and was published with editorial notes and additions by Fraser.

Tillyard and Fraser placed Hypolestes and the Asian genus Pseudolestes together in Hypolestinae, recognising them as unusual damselflies distinct from most members of Megapodagrionidae.

Fraser later revised this arrangement in 1957. He created the family Pseudolestidae to accommodate a number of geographically isolated and morphologically unusual damselfly genera, and placed Hypolestes within the subfamily Pseudolestinae together with Pseudolestes and several other genera. He regarded these taxa as aberrant lineages that could not be satisfactorily placed within existing families.

Subsequent morphological and molecular studies showed that the genera included in Pseudolestidae do not form a natural group. Modern classifications therefore recognise Hypolestes as the sole living genus of the family Hypolestidae.

In 2026, Carter and colleagues placed Hypolestidae within the newly recognised superfamily Polythoroidea, together with Dicteriadidae, Heteragrionidae, Mesagrionidae, Philogeniidae, Polythoridae and Rimanellidae, reflecting phylogenomic evidence for the relationships among these predominantly Neotropical damselfly lineages.

== Genera ==
The following is the only genus currently placed in Hypolestidae:

- Hypolestes Gundlach, 1888

Several fossil genera have been assigned to Hypolestidae. These are known from Europe and North America and indicate that the family had a wider historical distribution than its surviving Caribbean representatives.

== Etymology ==
The family name Hypolestidae is derived from the type genus Hypolestes, with the standard zoological suffix -idae used for animal families.

The genus name Hypolestes is presumably derived from the Greek ὑπό (hypo, "under", "below" or "somewhat") and Lestes, a genus of damselflies. The name probably reflects Gundlach's view that the genus was related to, or resembled, Lestes.
