= List of fossiliferous stratigraphic units in Mali =

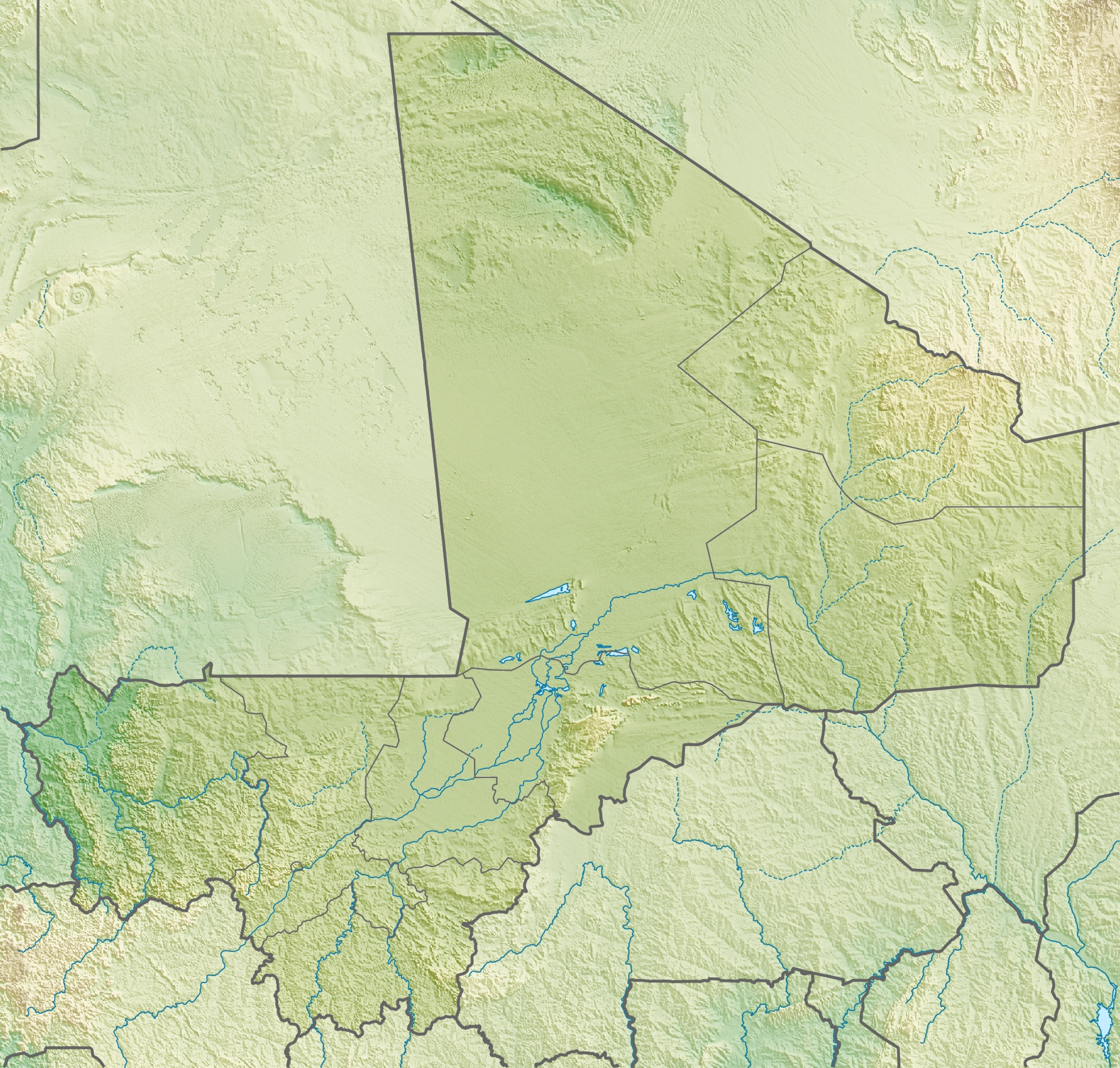
Fossiliferous stratigraphic units in Mali
Continental Terminal Formation
Tamaguélelt Formation
Teberemt Formation
Continental intercalaire formation

This is a list of fossiliferous stratigraphic units in Mali.

== List of fossiliferous stratigraphic units ==
Formation	Period	Fossils	Notes
Continental Terminal Formation	Lutetian	Moeritherium sp., Cubitostrea multicostata	
Tamaguélelt Formation	Ypresian	Palaeophis colossaeus, Phosphatosaurus gavialoides, Tilemsisuchus lavocati, Maliamia gigas, Numidotheriidae indet., Pliohyracidae indet., ?Proboscidea indet.	
Teberemt Formation	Paleocene	Acleistochelys maliensis, Azabbaremys moragjonesi, Hyposaurus sp., Crocodylomorpha indet., Cubitostrea multicostata, Linthia sudanensis, Deltoidonautilus sp.	
Continental Intercalaire Formation	Berriasian	cf. Sarcosuchus sp., Crocodylia indet., Lithostrotia indet., Sauropoda indet., Testudines indet.	

== See also ==
- Lists of fossiliferous stratigraphic units in Africa
  - List of fossiliferous stratigraphic units in Guinea
  - List of fossiliferous stratigraphic units in Ivory Coast
  - List of fossiliferous stratigraphic units in Mauritania
  - List of fossiliferous stratigraphic units in Niger
  - List of fossiliferous stratigraphic units in Senegal
- Geology of Mali
