= Tamaguélelt Formation =

Geological formation in Mali

- Stratigraphic range: Early Eocene (Ypresian); ~56–47.8 Ma
- Type: Geological formation
- Underlies: Continental Terminal Formation
- Overlies: Teberemt Formation

Lithology
- Primary: Phosphorite

Location
- Coordinates: 17.6°N 0.3°E
- Approximate paleocoordinates: 10.9°N 4.4°W
- Region: Er Rachidia
- Country: Mali
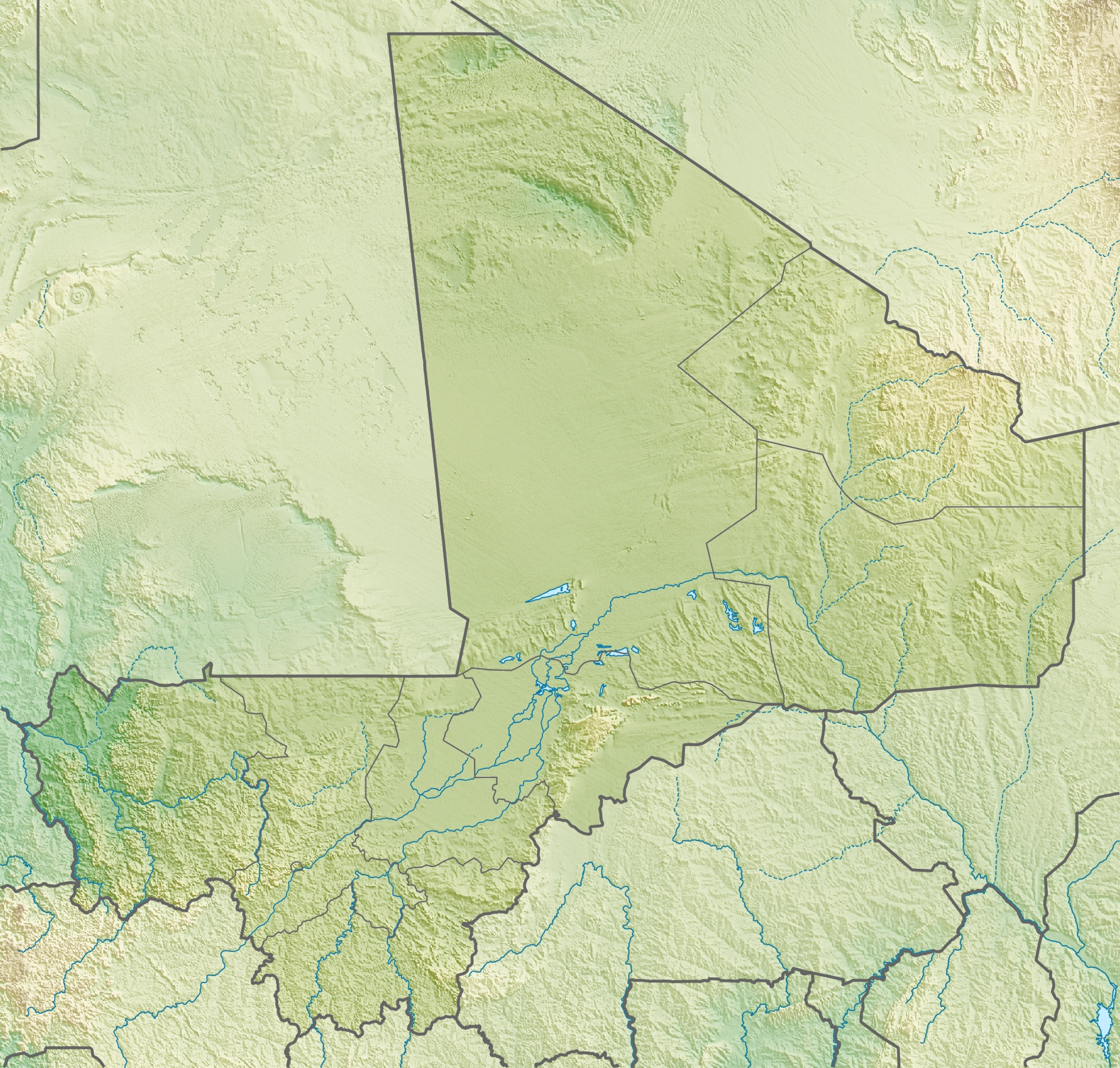
- Tamaguélelt Formation (Mali)

The Tamaguélelt Formation is an Early Eocene-aged geological formation in Mali. It comprises phosphorite sediments deposited within the Trans-Saharan seaway. Many of the preserved fossils of the formation indicate that it was a marginal marine habitat. In addition to these marine fossils, fossils of freshwater and terrestrial animals are also common in the formation, due to a vast freshwater network that regularly deposited fossils into the seaway.

== Fossil content ==
Color key: Taxon / Reclassified taxon / Taxon falsely reported as present / Dubious taxon or junior synonym / Ichnotaxon / Ootaxon / Morphotaxon	Notes; Uncertain or tentative taxa are in small text; ~~crossed out~~ taxa are discredited.

=== Reptiles ===
==== Squamata ====
Squamates from the Tamaguélelt Formation
Genus	Species	Material	Notes	Member	Images
Palaeophis	P. colossaeus	Vertebrae	A giant palaeophiid marine snake		
Serpentes	Serpentes indet.				

==== Crocodylomorpha ====
Crocodylomorphs from the Tamaguélelt Formation
Genus	Species	Material	Notes	Member	Images
Tilemsisuchus	T. lavocati		A dyrosaurid crocodylomorph		
Phosphatosaurus	P. gavialoides		A dyrosaurid crocodylomorph.		

=== Ray-finned fish ===
Ray-finned fish from the Tamaguélelt Formation
Genus	Species	Material	Notes	Member	Images
Brychaetus	B. sp.		A marine bonytongue.		
Claroteidae	Claroteidae indet.		A freshwater claroteid catfish.		
Cylindracanthus	C. sp.		A marine actinopterygian of uncertain affinities.		
Maliamia	M. gigas		A large marine vidalamiine amiid.		
Nigerium	N. tamaguelense		A freshwater claroteid catfish.		
Pycnodus	P. zeaformis		A marine pycnodont.		
Pycnodus	P. maliensis		A marine pycnodont.		
Pycnodus	P. sp		A marine pycnodont.		
Stratodus	S. apicalis		A giant marine dercetid aulopiform.		

=== Lobe-finned fish ===
Lungfish from the Tamaguélelt Formation
Genus	Species	Material	Notes	Member	Images
Lavocatodus	L. giganteus		A freshwater lavocatodid lungfish		
Protopterus	P. elongus		A freshwater protopterid lungfish		

=== Mammals ===
==== Proboscidea ====
Proboscideans from the Tamaguélelt Formation
Genus	Species	Material	Notes	Member	Images
Probscidea	Probscidea indet				
Numidotheriidae	Numidotheriidae indet.				
Plesielephantiformes	Plesielephantiformes indet.				

==== Hyracoidea ====
Hyraxes from the Tamaguélelt Formation
Genus	Species	Material	Notes	Member	Images
Pliohyracidae	Pliohyracidae indet.				

=== Mollusca ===
==== Bivalvia ====
Bivalves from the Tamaguélelt Formation
Genus	Species	Material	Notes	Member	Images
Pholadidae	Pholadidae indet.				
Gastrochaenolites	G. sp.				

==== Cephalopoda ====
Cephalopods from the Tamaguélelt Formation
Genus	Species	Material	Notes	Member	Images
Cimomia	C. ogbei		A hercoglossid nautiloid.		Cimonia
