= Quseir Formation =

Geological formation in Egypt

- Stratigraphic range: Campanian; ~80–72 Ma
- Type: Geological formation
- Sub-units: Mut & El Hindaw Members
- Underlies: Duwi Formation
- Overlies: Unconformity with Taref Formation
- Thickness: at least 250 metres (820 ft)

Lithology
- Primary: Shale
- Other: Sandstone, siltstone, phosphorite

Location
- Location: Al Wadi al Jadid, New Valley
- Coordinates: 25.6°N 29.1°E
- Approximate paleocoordinates: 9.3°N 24.9°E
- Region: Kharga Oasis
- Country: Egypt
- Quseir Formation (Egypt)

The Quseir Formation is a geological formation in the vicinity of the Kharga Oasis in Egypt. It is Campanian in age. The lithology largely consists of soft shale with hard bands of sandstone, siltstone and phosphorite. The environment of deposition was nearshore to freshwater fluvio-lacustrine characterized by moist and aquatic habitats with a tropical warm-humid climate. It is conformably overlain by the marine late Campanian-Maastrichtian Duwi Formation, and unconformably overlies the Turonian Taref Formation. The sauropod dinosaurs Mansourasaurus and Igai are known from the formation, as well as the proximal fibula of an indeterminate theropod and possible remains tentively assigned to Spinosaurus. Additionally the lungfish genera Lavocatodus and Protopterus, the crocodyliform Wahasuchus and the bothremydid turtle Khargachelys are also known.

== Fossil content ==
Color key: Taxon / Reclassified taxon / Taxon falsely reported as present / Dubious taxon or junior synonym / Ichnotaxon / Ootaxon / Morphotaxon	Notes; Uncertain or tentative taxa are in small text; ~~crossed out~~ taxa are discredited.

=== Dinosaurs ===
Theropods including a proximal fibula and specimens tentatively assigned to Cenomanian theropod genera Spinosaurus and Carcharodontosaurus are now classified as Theropoda indet.

==== Sauropods ====
Sauropods of the Quseir Formation
Genus	Species	Location	Stratigraphic position	Material	Notes	Images
Mansourasaurus	M. shahinae				A lithostrotian titanosaur	
Igai	I. semkhu				A saltasaurid titanosaur	

==== Theropods ====
Theropods of the Quseir Formation
Genus	Species	Location	Stratigraphic position	Material	Notes	Images
cf.Abelisauridae	Indeterminate			Proximal fibula (MUVP 187)		
Theropoda	Indeterminate			Caudal vertebra (MUVP 199)		

=== Fish ===
==== Bony fish ====
Bony fish of the Quseir Formation
Genus	Species	Location	Stratigraphic position	Material	Notes	Images
Lavocatodus	L. giganteus				A lavocatodid lungfish	
Lavocatodus	L. humei				A lavocatodid lungfish	
Lavocatodus	L. protopteroides				A lavocatodid lungfish	
Protopterus	P. nigeriensis				A protopterid lungfish	
Lepisosteoidea	Indeterminate		Mut Member			

==== Cartilaginous Fish ====
Cartilaginous Fishes of the Quseir Formation
Genus	Species	Location	Stratigraphic position	Material	Notes	Images
Scapanorhynchus	S. rapax		Mut Member	Teeth	A close relative of the living goblin shark	

=== Crocodylomorphs ===
Crocodylomorpha of the Quseir Formation
Genus	Species	Location	Stratigraphic position	Material	Notes	Images
Dyrosauridae indet.	Indeterminate			Mandibular symphysis		
Wahasuchus	W. egyptensis				A mesoeucrocodylian	
Wadisuchus	W. kassabi			Skulls	A dyrosaurid.	

=== Turtles ===
Turtles of the Quseir Formation
Genus	Species	Location	Stratigraphic position	Material	Notes	Images
Khargachelys	K. caironensis				A bothremydid side-necked turtle	
