= Acleistochelys =

Acleistochelys Temporal range: Paleocene ~61.7–55.8 Ma

Scientific classification
- Kingdom: Animalia
- Phylum: Chordata
- Class: Reptilia
- Order: Testudines
- Suborder: Pleurodira
- Family: †Bothremydidae
- Genus: †Acleistochelys
- Species: †A. maliensis

Binomial name
- †Acleistochelys maliensis Gaffney at al., 2007

Genus of reptiles

Acleistochelys ("hollowed turtle") is an extinct genus of large, bothremydid pleurodiran turtle known from Paleocene deposits in the Teberemt Formation of Mali. The type species, A. maliensis, was named for the country in which it was found. The holotype specimen consists of a nearly complete skull, shell fragments, pelvic fragments, and a cervical vertebra. It is most closely related to another Paleocene Malian side-necked turtle, Azabbaremys.

== Description ==
Acleistochelys has a narrow skull compared to Azabbaremys. It lacks the broad palate and triturating surface seen in durophagous turtles and may have been piscivorous, preferring to eat fish. The fragments of its carapace that have been found show an irregular surface texture of anastomosing furrows that form raised humps.

== Paleoenvironment ==
Acleistochelys is known from shallow marine deposits in the middle to upper portion of the Teberemt Formation, dating to the post-Danian portion of the Paleocene Epoch. Sea levels rose and fell over the course of the Late Cretaceous and early Paleogene, and much of northwest Africa was submerged in a shallow body of water, called the Trans-Saharan Seaway, no more than 50 meters deep. Acleistochelys lived alongside crocodiles and lungfish (Lavocatodus giganteus). Invertebrates in its ecosystem included oysters (Ostrea multicostata), nautiloids (Deltoidonautilus sp.), gastropods (Gistortia sp.), sea urchins (e.g., Linthia sudanensis, Oriolampas michelini), and bivalves (Lucinidae indet.).

Over a dozen species of Paleogene north African side-necked turtles had been discovered by the time Acleistochelys was first described, and the presence of multiple large bothremydids (Acleistochelys and Azabbaremys) in Mali's near-shore marine sediments seems to indicate that northwest Africa was an area of bothremydid diversification throughout the Paleogene.
