= P. amphibius =

P. amphibius may refer to:

- Protopterus amphibius, a lungfish species
- Puntius amphibius, the scarlet-banded barb, a fish species

== See also ==
- Amphibius (disambiguation)
