= Azabbaremys =

Azabbaremys Temporal range: Paleocene, 61.7–55.8 Ma

Scientific classification
- Kingdom: Animalia
- Phylum: Chordata
- Class: Reptilia
- Order: Testudines
- Suborder: Pleurodira
- Family: †Bothremydidae
- Tribe: †Taphrosphyini
- Subtribe: †Taphrosphyina
- Genus: †Azabbaremys; Gaffney, Moody & Walker, 2001
- Species: †A. moragjonesi

Binomial name
- †Azabbaremys moragjonesi Gaffney, Moody & Walker, 2001

Genus of reptiles

Azabbaremys is an extinct genus of bothremydid pleurodiran turtle that was discovered in the Teberemt Formation of Mali. It was described in 2001, based on a skull that had been recovered in an expedition in 1981. The genus consists solely of the type species Azabbaremys moragjonesi. The genus name is derived from Azabbar, a monster in Tamasheq folk stories. The species is named for Morag Jones, a research student who participated in the discovery of the specimen and died in the expedition. Azabbaremys is most closely related to another Paleocene side-necked turtle, Acleistochelys.

== Description ==
The holotype of Azabbaremys is a nearly complete skull, completely lacking the lower jaw. The skull has a median length of 145.5 mm from the premaxilla to condyle and a maximum width of 164.3 mm. The skull measures 67.1 mm in height from the condyle to the top of the skull roof. The triturating surface, the cutting or grinding surface of the jaws, is rugose, having been formed by a series of rough corrugations shaped like small teeth, unlike the smooth triturating surfaces seen in other bothremydids such as Nigeremys and Taphrosphys.

== Paleoenvironment ==
Azabbaremys was discovered in the Teberemt Formation of Mali, which represents a shallow marine deposition within the Trans-Saharan Seaway. Sea levels were higher during the Paleogene than they are today, and an inland sea had been fluctuating in coverage over the Sahara since the Late Cretaceous, at times submerging an estimated 2500–3000 km^{2} of northwest Africa beneath 50 meters of water. The Trans-Saharan Seaway may have served as a dispersal route for marine fauna between the Tethys Sea and South Atlantic Ocean. Many fossils of fishes and crocodyliforms are known from the Teberemt Formation, as are invertebrates including nautiloids (Cimomia reymenti), echinoids (Linthia sudanensis), and oysters (Ostrea multicostata).
