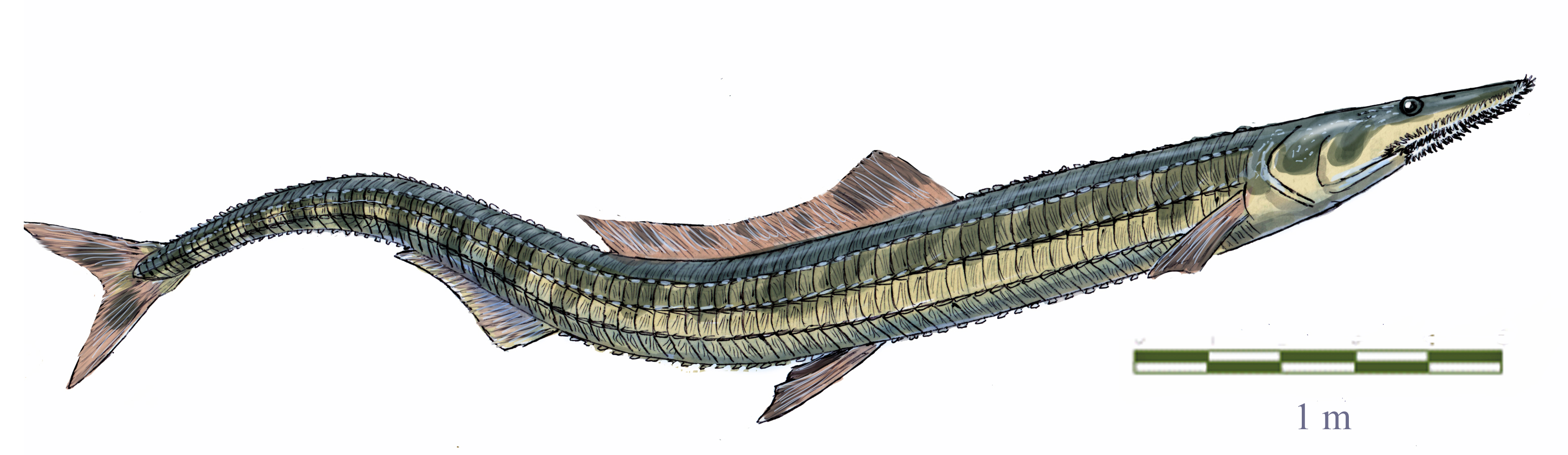
- Restoration

Scientific classification
- Kingdom: Animalia
- Phylum: Chordata
- Class: Actinopterygii
- Order: Aulopiformes; Regan, 1911
- Family: †Dercetidae (?)
- Genus: †Stratodus; Cope, 1872

Species
- †S. apicalis (Cope, 1872)

Synonyms
- †S. oxypogon (Cope, 1877)

= Stratodus =

Stratodus Temporal range: Cretaceous (Maastrichtian) - Eocene

Extinct genus of fishes

Stratodus ("layer tooth") is a genus of giant prehistoric aulopiform fish found in Cretaceous-aged marine strata of Kansas, Alabama, Morocco, Israel, Niger, South Dakota, and Jordan. It has also been found in the Tamaguélelt Formation of Mali, dating to the Lower Eocene, indicating that Stratodus survived the Cretaceous-Paleogene extinction event. This sleek fish has an upper jaw filled with multiple rows of tiny teeth and was the largest aulopiform, reaching 5 metres (16 ft) in length.

== History of discovery ==
Stratodus was initially described by Edward Drinker Cope in Kansas during 1872, naming the type species S. apicalis, and described a second species in 1877, S. oxypogon, both species being assigned to the family Stratodontidae. S. oxypogon is now often considered a synonym of S. apicalis, and the family was shifted from Stratodontidae to Dercetidae, some has gone back to Stratodontidae while others support attribution to Dercetidae.

For the 19th and 20th centuries, Stratodus was only known from poor fossils, usually of the skull. It wasn't until 2006 that a nearly complete skeleton of S. apicalis in the Upper Niobrara Formation was discovered by Dave Palmquist, along the bank of the Missouri River of Oacoma, South Dakota, and other well preserved remains have subsequently been found in the Muwaqqar Chalk Marl Formation of Harrana, Jordan. Marc Michaut described second species "S. indamanensis" from Mt Indamane (Mont In Daman) site in Niger in 2002, along with smaller relative named "Ministratodus". However, the publication that described these taxa is not ascertained to be valid publication under the International Code of Zoological Nomenclature, same as a turtle "Kaosaurus" Michaut described from same site. Paper in 2020 considered that remains from Mt Indamane is S. apicalis or "species not verified" instead. In 2019, fossils of S. apicalis were found in Mali dating to the Eocene.

== Description ==
Stratodus in many respects is similar in appearance to other lizardfish but much larger, as S. apicalis could grow to over a meter while 'S. indamanensis' could reach lengths of 5 m (16 ft). Remains that was once considered as S. apicalis from Israel shows its skull may exceeded 60 cm (2.0 ft). The body is long and slender, anguiliform in shape, and is covered in thick, spiny scutes. An elongated dorsal fin runs down the back.

Perhaps the most striking feature of Stratodus were its conical, inward pointing teeth. Stratodus possessed multiple rows of these teeth which could reach 7 mm (0.28 in). These teeth were extremely numerous, with at least 6,000 being present in the fish's mouth, to the point that over 1,000 of the teeth are oriented outside of the jaws on the lips of the fish.

== Paleoecology ==
During the Late Cretaceous, Stratodus had a cosmopolitan distribution on both sides of the North Atlantic Ocean, along with North Africa and Arabia. It lived in shallow, epicontinental waters only a few meters deep. While modern aulopiformes are often ambush predators, Stratodus appears capable of active hunting, owing to a muscular and hydrodynamic body, and swam in an anguilliform-esque fashion. Its hunting strategy has been hypothesized to resemble that of billfish, using its external teeth to injure prey before returning to devour them, indicated by its external teeth and club-like protrusion at the end of its skull.

Stratodus is one of the few large fish to exist on both sides of the K-Pg boundary, surviving the asteroid that caused the extinction of most other megafauna. In the Eocene, Stratodus inhabited brackish-to-marine tropical waters in the Trans-Saharan Seaway, living alongside animals like Palaeophis colossaeus and Rhabdognathus.
