= TEDDM1 =

Protein-coding gene in humans

Identifiers
- Aliases: TEDDM1, EDDM9, Epdd1, HE9, TMEM45C, HEL-S-45e, transmembrane epididymal protein 1
- External IDs: MGI: 3646829; GeneCards: TEDDM1

Gene location (Human)
Chr.	Chromosome 1 (human)
Band	1q25.3	Start	182,398,117 bp
Band	1q25.3	End	182,400,667 bp

Gene location (Mouse)
Chr.	Chromosome 1 (mouse)
Band	1|1 G3	Start	153,750,091 bp
Band	1|1 G3	End	153,752,617 bp
RNA expression pattern
Bgee	Human / Mouse (ortholog); Top expressed in: corpus epididymis; testicle; caput epididymis; tail of epididymis; Achilles tendon; right uterine tube; seminal vesicula; granulocyte; left ovary; body of uterus / Top expressed in: embryo; embryo; morula; blastocyst; epiblast; olfactory bulb; mesencephalon; gonad; testicle; More reference expression data
BioGPS	n/a
Orthologs
Databases	NCBI: entry; OMA: entry
Species	Human	Mouse
Entrez	127670	433365
Ensembl	ENSG00000203730	ENSMUSG00000043282
UniProt	Q5T9Z0	Q8CC62
RefSeq (mRNA)	NM_172000	NM_001008426
RefSeq (protein)	NP_741997	NP_001008426
Location (UCSC)	Chr 1: 182.4 – 182.4 Mb	Chr 1: 153.75 – 153.75 Mb
PubMed search
- Wikidata
View/Edit Human	View/Edit Mouse

Transmembrane epididymal protein 1 is a transmembrane protein encoded by the TEDDM1 gene. TEDDM1 is also commonly known as TMEM45C and encodes 273 amino acids that contains six alpha-helix transmembrane regions. The protein contains a 118 amino acid length family of unknown function. While the exact function of TEDDM1 is not understood, it is predicted to be an integral component of the plasma membrane.

== Gene ==
=== Locus ===
TEDDM1 is located on chromosome 1 found at 1q25.3 on the minus end. TEDDM1 is composed of a single exon. The gene neighborhood of TEDDM1 includes glutamate-ammonia ligase (GLUL), long intergenic non-protein coding RNA 272 (LINC00272), and Sharpr-MPRA regulatory region 13543 (LOC122149321).

Location of TEDDM1 on Chromosome 1.

=== Expression ===
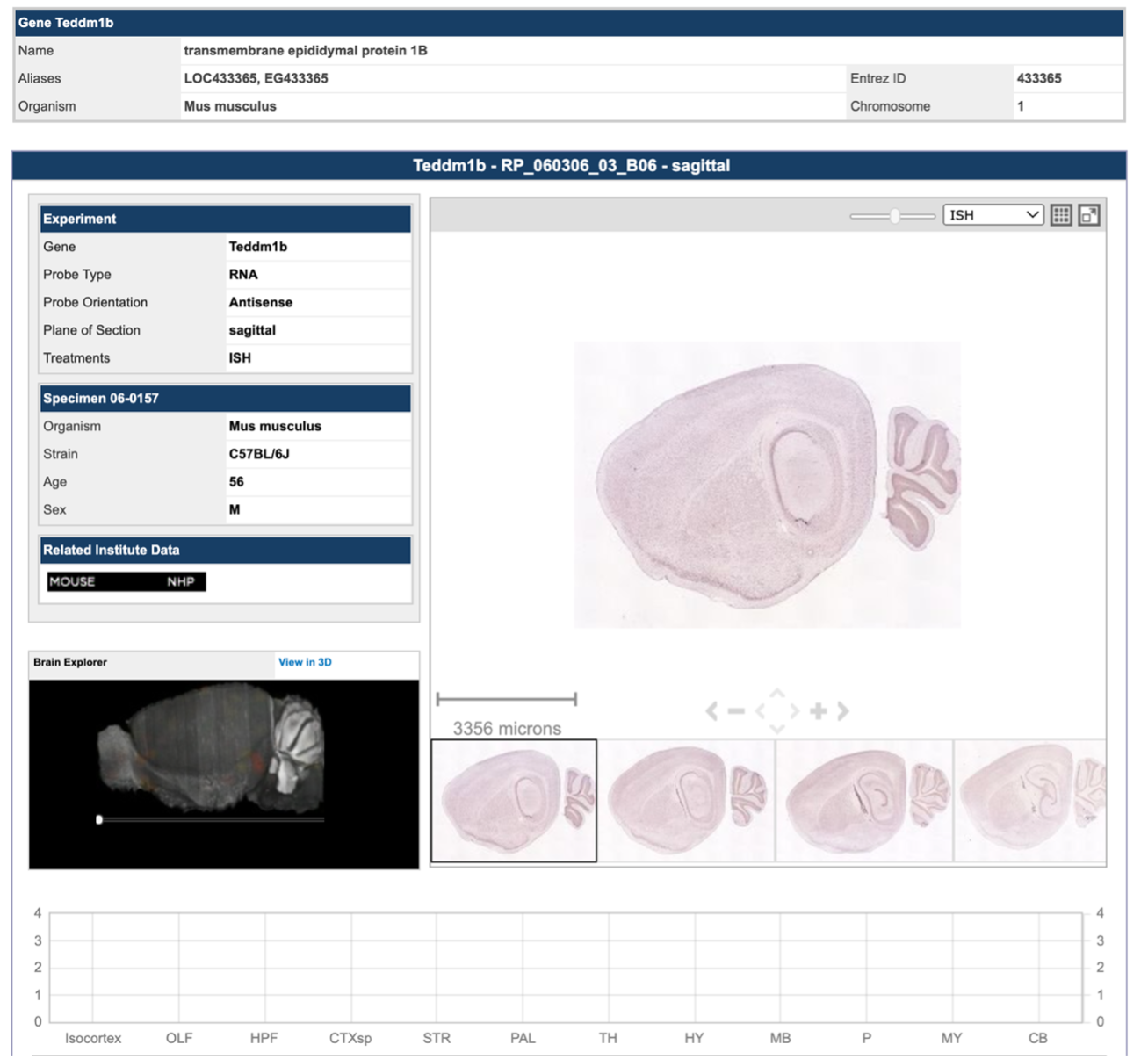
Allen Brain Atlas depiction of TEDDM1 expression in Mus musculus using an RNA probe

TEDDM1 is expressed in most major tissues. The gene is expressed at a high level in the testis and a low level in the heart relative to all other tissues with TEDDM1 expression. In the brain, TEDDM1 is expressed in the amygdala, the hippocampus, and the striatum. In the mouse brain, TEDDM1 was discovered with general expression using an RNA probe.

Within the cell, TEDDM1 is primarily expressed in the plasma membrane. Similar to other membrane-bound proteins, TEDDM1 protein contains a predicted signal peptide, although the type of signal peptide is unknown. Because TEDDM1 shares many characteristics with other transmembrane proteins, this suggests that the protein may have a role in various cell processes like signal transduction and protein trafficking.

=== Gene Level Regulation ===
The expression pattern of TEDDM1 was ubiquitous. TEDDM1 mRNA abundance was moderate to low in humans.

== Protein ==
The molecular weight of the TEDDM1 protein is approximately 31.3 kDa and the theoretical isoelectric point (pI) of TEDDM1 is 8.02. Notably, this is different than the average pI of other proteins as their pI land in the pH range of 4–7. This suggests that TEDDM1 protein contains an excess of basic amino acids relative to most proteins.

=== Domains ===
TEDDM1 has a single major domain of unknown function entitled DUF716. This domain spans from amino acid position 95 to 219 of the protein. DUF716 contains the majority of a leucine zipper which is typically associated with dimerization of the protein. DUF716 also contains three of the six transmembrane regions in the protein, and contains amino acid segments of high conservation, suggesting DUF716 likely plays an important role in TEDDM1 protein function.

=== Post-translational modifications ===
TEDDM1 is subject to several post-translational modifications. There are eighteen predicted phosphorylation sites. Other specific sites include an N-glycosylation site, a casein kinase II phosphorylation site, a Leucine zipper pattern, two N-myristylation sites, and three protein kinase C phosphorylation sites. N-glycosylation is another typical feature of membrane proteins and is involved in secretion and cytoskeletal organization. Casein kinase II is involved with protein stability and cell signaling response. Leucine zippers are sequence motifs that facilitate protein–protein interactions. N-myristylation sites are involved in ligand binding and protein dynamics. Protein kinase C phosphorylation has to do with regulation of cell proliferation and gene expression.

=== Structure ===
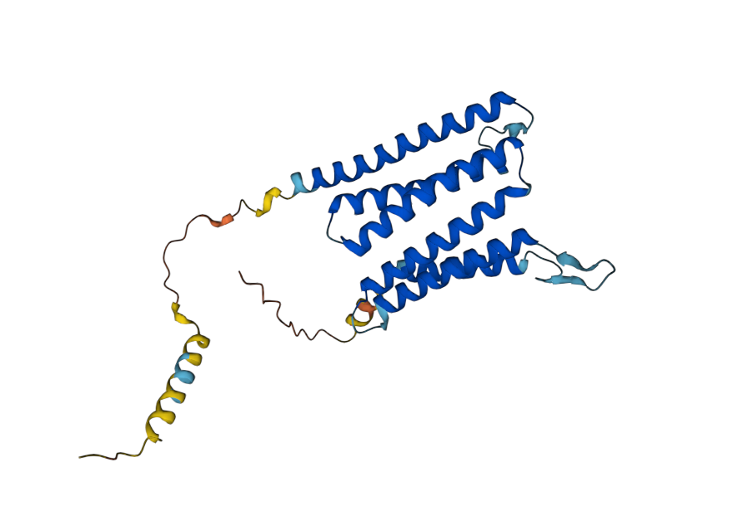
Alphafold depiction of the tertiary structure of TEDDM1

The secondary structure of TEDDM1 begins with free random coils at the N-terminus and a single alpha helix. The six transmembrane proteins in TEDDM1 are characterized as structurally similar alpha helices. This region of the protein is quite condensed relative to the N-terminus. Alpha helices typically have mainly hydrophobic residues, which aligns with these regions being located within the plasma membrane. Alpha helices are also commonly associated with DNA binding motifs.

== Homology/evolution ==
=== Paralogs ===
TEDDM1 has two known paralogs, TMEM45A and TMEM45B.

=== Orthologs ===
Over 100 orthologs exist for human gene TEDDM1. Of these known orthologs they were found only to exist in mammals, amphibians, and fish.The divergence date of all orthologs found were compared relative to Homo sapiens. Fish TEDDM1 are the most distantly related orthologs to Human TEDDM1, with the furthest median date of divergence being 464 million years ago. While orthologs for TEDDM1 exist in bony fish, as evidenced by its existence in Protopterus annectens, orthologs of the gene were far more frequently found in cartilaginous fish.

Seq #	TEDDM1	Genus, Species	Common Name	Taxonomic Order	Divergence Date (MYA)	Accession Number	Query Cover	Sequence Length (aa)	Sequence Identity (%)	Sequence Similarity (%)
1	Mammals	Homo sapiens	human	Primate	0	NP_741997.3	100	273	100	100
2		Nannospalax galili	middle east blind mole-rat	Rodentia	89	XP_008836723.1	100	305	71	74
3		Gracilinanus agilis	agile gracile opossum	Didelphimorphia	160	XP_044531579.1	80	295	35	49
4		Tachyglossus aculeatus	short beaked echidna	Tachyglossidae	180	XP_038601041.1	82	295	37	50
5	Amphibians	Xenopus tropicalis	western clawed frog	Pipidae	353	XP_017949911.1	82	284	32	43
6		Geotrypetes seraphini	gaboon caecilian	Dermorphiidae	353	XP_033814670.1	70	308	36	28
7		Rhinatrema bivittatum	two-lined caecelian	Gymnophiona	353	XP_029473035.1	77	305	36	47
8		Nanorana parkeri	high himalaya frog	Dicroglossidae	353	XP_018432032.1	80	264	30	44
9	Fish	Protopterus annectens	west african lungfish	Protopteridae	408	XP_043932144.1	86	308	34	44
10		Amblyraja radiata	thorny skate	Rajidae	464	XP_032887195.1	58	314	47	47
11		Callorhinchus milii	elephant shark	Holocephali	464	XP_007900619.1	75	300	36	46
12		Carcharodon carcharias	great white shark	Chondrichthyes	464	XP_041060943.1	81	306	39	48

=== Evolution ===
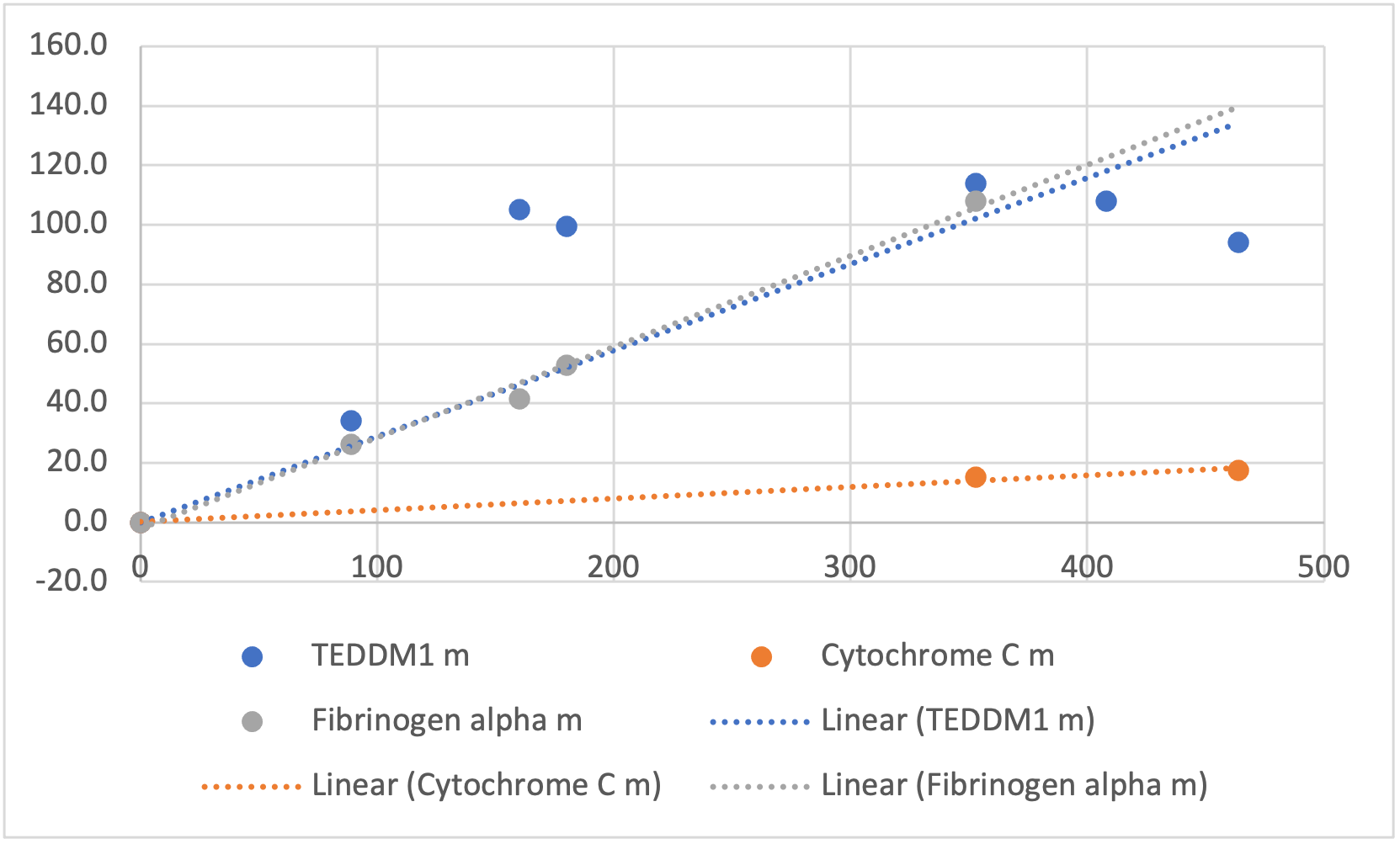
TEDDM1 molecular evolution rate relative to Fibrinogen Alpha and Cytochrome C

The relative rate of molecular evolution of TEDDM1 was quite similar to that of Fibrinogen Alpha and much more rapid than the evolution rate of Cytochrome C.

== Interacting proteins ==
Predicted functional partners to the TEDDM1 protein found via STRING.

Protein	Description	Function
SBK2	Serine/threonine-protein kinase 2	Predicted to be involved in MAPK cascade and protein phosphorylation
METTL7B	Methyltransferase-like protein 7B	Probable methyltransferase
PATE2	Prostate and testis expressed 2	Contain LY6/PLAUR domain in extracellular space
ODF3L1	Outer dense fiber protein 3-like protein 1	Active in cytoskeleton
DEFB30	Beta-defensin 130a; Defensin, beta 130	Antimicrobial host-defense peptide, antiplasmodial activity
SPINT3	Serine peptidase inhibitor, Kunitz type 3	Enable receptor antagonist activity and beta binding activity
TSPAN1	Tetraspanin-1	Mediate signal transduction events, role in the regulation of cell development, growth
WFDC10A	Wap four-disulfide core domain protein 10a	Functions as a protease inhibitor
EDDM3B	Epididymal secretory protein E3-beta	Possible function in sperm maturation

== Clinical significance ==
According to previous cancer research studies, gene-based association analyses discovered that TEDDM1 along with GLUL are the two genes most significantly correlated with hepatitis B virus related hepatocellular carcinoma, the most common form of liver cancer. TEDDM1 also has significant clinical significance due to its involvement with keratinocytes and the inhibition of microRNA-31, an important regulator of embryonic implantation and development.
