= Lavocatodus =

Lavocatodus Temporal range: Maastrichtian–Ypresian

Scientific classification
- Domain: Eukaryota
- Kingdom: Animalia
- Phylum: Chordata
- Clade: Sarcopterygii
- Class: Dipnoi
- Order: Ceratodontiformes
- Family: †Lavocatodidae
- Genus: †Lavocatodus; Martin, 1995

Type species
- †Lavocatodus giganteus Martin, 1995

Species
- †L. giganteus Martin, 1995; †L.? humei (Martin, 1984); †L.? protopteroides (Martin, 1984)

Extinct genus of fishes

Lavocatodus is an extinct genus of freshwater lungfish from northern Africa. Its remains are found in geological formations dating from the Late Cretaceous to the Eocene. Some researchers included Lavocatodus within the family Lepidosirenidae, but Longrich (2017) recovered both Lavocatodus and Xenoceratodus within a separate family Lavocatodidae.

The type species L. giganteus lived in Mali between the Maastrichtian age of the Late Cretaceous and the Ypresian age of the Eocene. Fossils of L. giganteus are known from the Maastrichtian-aged Ménaka Formation, the Paleocene (Selandian to Thanetian) Teberemt Formation, and the Ypresian-aged Tamaguélelt Formation. These are all marine formations originating from the Trans-Saharan Seaway, but remains of the freshwater Lavocatodus are thought to have been regularly deposited into them by a series of rivers. L. giganteus is notable for apparently having survived the Cretaceous-Paleogene extinction event, as its remains are known from both sides of the K-Pg boundary.

In addition to L. giganteus, two other possible species, L.? humei and L.? protopteroides, are known from the Campanian Quseir Formation in Egypt, but their taxonomic position within the genus is uncertain.
