= Shendi Formation =

Geologic unit

- Stratigraphic range: Maastrichtian; ~70–66 Ma
- Type: Geological formation
- Sub-units: Umm Ali & Kabushiya members
- Underlies: Hudi Chert
- Overlies: Precambrian basement
- Thickness: 63 m (207 ft)

Lithology
- Primary: Sandstone
- Other: Siltstone, mudstone

Location
- Coordinates: 16.7°N 33.4°E
- Region: River Nile State
- Country: Sudan
- Extent: Atbara-Shendi Basin

Type section
- Named for: Shendi
- Shendi Formation (Sudan)

The Shendi Formation is a Late Cretaceous geologic formation of the Atbara-Shendi Basin in northern Sudan. Indeterminate theropod remains have been recovered from it. As well as those of the dyrosaurid Hyposaurus. It consists of a lower unit of fine grained meandering channel sediments, separated by an erosive contact with overlying meandering to braided river channel sandstones.

The formation overlies Precambrian basement and is overlain by the Hudi Chert. The total thickness of the formation amounts to 63 metres (207 ft).

== Paleofauna ==
- Hyposaurus
- Theropoda indet.

== See also ==
- List of dinosaur-bearing rock formations
  - List of stratigraphic units with indeterminate dinosaur fossils
