= Wahasuchus =

Wahasuchus Temporal range: Campanian, ~73 Ma
- Skull of Wahasuchus

Scientific classification
- Domain: Eukaryota
- Kingdom: Animalia
- Phylum: Chordata
- Class: Reptilia
- Clade: Archosauria
- Clade: Pseudosuchia
- Clade: Crocodylomorpha
- Clade: Mesoeucrocodylia
- Genus: †Wahasuchus; Saber et al., 2018

Type species
- †Wahasuchus egyptensis Saber et al., 2018

Extinct genus of reptiles

Wahasuchus is an extinct genus of engimatic mesoeucrocodylian, likely a neosuchian, of the Middle Campanian age found in the Quseir Formation, Egypt. First described in 2018, Wahasuchus is known mostly from fragmentary remains representing multiple individuals. Given its incomplete nature, it is not entirely clear what its closest relatives are, though features of the skull including its generally flattened morphology akin to that of modern crocodiles suggests it was part of the clade Neosuchia. However it bears no close resemblance to any of the early Cretaceous forms known from northern Africa nor the contemporary taxa of Europe, suggesting that it might have been part of a unique radiation endemic to Africa. The genus currently only contains a single species, Wahasuchus egyptensis.

== History and naming ==
Fossils of Wahasuchus have been recovered from the Late Cretaceous (Campanian) El Hindaw Member of the Quseir Formation in Egypt, with the discovery having been made in 2010 by members of Mansoura University. All material assigned to this taxon have been collected form an outcrop near Mut in Dakhla Oasis in Egypts Western Desert. In addition to the various skull remains that form the holotype, several additional fossils were referred to Wahasuchus from a nearby bonebed. The material was described by Sara Saber and colleagues in 2018 and is held in the collection of the Mansoura University Vertebrate Paleontology Center.

The name Wahasuchus is derived from the Arabic word واحة (waha), which means "oasis", in reference to the origin of the material, and the commonly used souchos, the Ancient Greek word for crocodile, itself derived from the Egyptian deity Sobek. The species name simply refers to the fact that the material was found in Egypt.

== Description ==
=== Skull ===
Though no complete skulls are known, reassembly based on what is available suggests that the skull of Wahasuchus was platyrostral, meaning it was flattened in a similar manner to those of modern crocodiles. At the same time however, Saber and colleagues highlight that the snout of Wahasuchus was massively built, with the individual elements being relatively expanded giving some depth to the rostrum.

The premaxillae, which form the very tip of the snout, were rounded and encased most of the external nares. Five alveoli were present in each premaxilla, with the first two being confluent, the third being the largest and the fourth and fifth being smaller again. The fifth premaxillary tooth is further noted for being the smallest in the entire premaxilla and for only being separated from the fourth tooth by a very thin section of bone. As is common in many neosuchians, the premaxillary toothrow is followed immediately by a toothless region marked by a large notch, which when the jaws are closed serves to receive the enlarged fourth dentary tooth. This notch further houses the contact between the premaxilla and the maxilla, which appears as a large element with a sinuous outer and lower margin. More specifically, the maxilla expands laterally (to the side) in tandem with an increase in tooth size among the maxillary teeth, of which there are 14. The first wave of tooth enlargement consists of the first five teeth, gradually becoming larger until they hit their peak with the third maxillary tooth, then growing smaller again. When looking at the skull from below it is clearly visible that the position of the largest tooth coincides with the maxilla bulging out, while the end of the first wave and transition to the second wave is marked by another prominent notch in the bone which may have received an enlarged dentary similar to what is the case for the notch between the premaxilla and maxilla. The second wave of tooth enlargement spans from the sixth to fourteenth tooth, displaying rapid increase leading up to the 8th, remaining fairly constant across the following three teeth and then decreasing again until the final maxillary tooth. It has also been noted that through the maxilla the teeth are closely spaced, with the last seven being confluent, with little to no space between the individual tooth sockets.

The jugal preserves the typical triradiate anatomy of crocodyliforms with a broad anterior and narrow posterior as well as a contribution to the postorbital bar, which separates the eyesockets and the infratemporal fenestra. The anterior process in Wahasuchus is especially large, thrice as broad as the posterior process and bearing an expanded orbital lamina. The surface texture differs across the jugal, with the external surface dominated by crenulations, pits, and grooves, the ventral surface bearing foramina and pits and the surface just below the eyesockets being marked by shallow grooves. The posterior process of the jugal contacts the anterior portion along a straight contact, which helps set it apart from the semi-aquatic notosuchians of the Mahajangasuchidae, which have starkly bent contact between the two processes. Instead, Wahasuchus resembles various neosuchians in this aspect of its anatomy. However, other aspects of the jugal anatomy clearly differentiate Wahasuchus from most neosuchians. Notably the external surface of the postorbital bar is only weakly inset relative to the rest of the jugal's surface, which contrasts with neosuchians like Ocepesuchus, Goniopholis and Sarcosuchus. Overall the postorbital bar is oriented in a way that its lower end is ahead of its upper end, which positions the front end of the infratemporal fenestra ventrolateral to the eyesocket, which is not seen in other crocodyliforms. Both quadrate bones are known, but poorly preserved. The surface of these bones is smooth and Saber and colleagues hypothesize that there was no contact with the exoccipital bone, unlike in goniopholidids and allodaposuchids, though they mention that this might also be caused by preservation.

Various parts of the skull table are also known, among them the postorbital bone. The postorbital is triradiate, meaning it consists of three main sections. Two of them are well visible from above, the anteromedial process that connects to the parietal and frontal bone and the posterior process that extends back and contacts the squamosal, both of them together forming whats called the dorsal lamina. The third element of the postorbital is its contribution to the postorbital bar. Among the diagnostic features of Wahasuchus is that the region where the dorsal lamina meets the postorbital bar bears a rugose depression or fossa. While similar structures are known in notosuchians, in the case of Wahasuchus this feature does not appear to be associated with a palpebral bone. The difference lies in the fact that in Wahasuchus this fossa is overhung by the dorsal lamina, while in the afforementioned notosuchians the fossa is a projection of the postorbital bar that projects upwards as a shelf. The postorbital is also among the three bones that form the margins of the supratemporal fenestra alongside the parietal and the squamosal. The parietal has a weak groove that runs down its center and overhangs parts of the supraoccipital bone towards the back of the skull table, though a notch in the parietal allows for the supraoccipital to still be visible in top view. The supraoccipital also possesses a small tuber that is directed towards the back of the skull, just below of which the animal had a distinct fossa. The squamosals, which forms the back edges of the skull table, are only incompletely known from both their dorsal and descending laminae (visible from the side). The dorsal laminae is among the elements that participate in forming the supratemporal fenestra and on the outer edge it bears a point of attachment for the musculature of the ear. The lateral descending bears the otic opening and the otic recess was enclosed like in neosuchians, while notosuchians have a posteriorly open otic recess.

The lower jaw bears a relatively straight upper margin and a broad mandibular symphysis (the region where the two halves of the lower jaw meet). At least 16 teeth were housed in the dentary, although preservation suggests that one or two more were likely present, bringing the total to 17 or 18 teeth. The first five of these are all located around the dentary symphysis, with a poorly preserved tooth suggesting that the first dentary tooth was angled forward. As is most often the case for neosuchians, the largest tooth of the lower jaw is the fourth, which slides neatly into the notch present between the premaxillary and maxillary teeth in the upper jaw. In turn, several occlusal notches are present in the lower jaw to receive the larger maxillary teeth. One such notch is present in the short toothless region between the fifth and sixth dentary tooth and again between the sixth and seventh, likely to accommodate for the enlarged third and fourth maxillary teeth (the largest of the first wave). The seventh to tenth dentary teeth were similarly enlarged to those in the upper jaw and the seventh in particular may have been so large that it slid into the constriction between the first and second wave of maxillary teeth. Following these, the remaining dentary teeth are small. Only parts of the splenial are known, but they reveal that it did contribute to the mandibular symphysis.

=== Postcrania ===
Various elements of the postcranial skeleton have been found and described for Wahasuchus, including vertebrae of the body and tail, a partial upper arm bone, a femur and parts of a tibia.

=== Size ===
Tho the size of Wahasuchus is not explicitly stated in the original description, a later conference abstract by Saber and colleagues described it as "large".

== Classification ==
A wide range of different crocodyliforms are known from the Cretaceous of North Africa, with continental deposits of the Aptian and Albian heavily featuring notosuchians like peirosaurids, uruguaysuchids and even mahajangasuchids in addition to neosuchians like Stomatosuchus, Sarcosuchus and Elosuchus. Especially towards the end of the Cretaceous however, marine formations similar to the Quseir Formation more heavily feature members of the Dyrosauridae, coastal marine animals, typically with slender jaws, though the overall record of crocodyliforms following the Cenomanian is relatively poor.

Wahasuchus is notable not only due to it being distinct from any of the major groups recognized from the Cretaceous of North Africa, but also since it does not bear any resemblance to the many specialised neosuchians that inhabited Europe around the same time either. This does however also mean that its exact relationship with other crocodyliforms remains elusive, not helped by the poor preservation of the known material, especially concerning the palate.

Some features would agree with Wahasuchus being classified as a member of neosuchia, such as the flattened skull, enclosed otic opening and the simple dentition. The fact that the vertebrae are amphicoelous suggests that it could have been an early-diverging member of the group while the platyrostral skull shape is likely to have been acquired independently from other members of the group, given that this feature has evolved multiple times across Neosuchia. The lack of ties to European neosuchians could suggest that Wahasuchus was part of an as of yet unknown radiation endemic to Africa. One hypothetical position for Wahasuchus within Neosuchia has been provided by Krause and colleagues in 2019.

- Mesoeucrocodylia
  - †Notosuchia
  - Neosuchia
    - - †Pholidosauridae
      - †Dyrosauridae
    - †Goniopholididae
    - †Wahasuchus
    - †Atoposauridae
    - Eusuchia
      - †Bernissartiidae
      - †Stomatosuchidae
      - †Aegyptosuchidae
      - †Susisuchidae
      - - †Paralligatoridae
        - †Allodaposuchidae
        - †Hylaeochampsidae
        - Crocodylia

== Paleobiology ==
=== Paleoenvironment ===
The sediments of the Quseir Formation represent a diverse range of environments that would have been present along the shore of northern Africa, ranging from rivers to brackish waters and even shallow parts of the Tethys sea. Angiosperms were the dominant terrestrial flora at the time as revealed by fossil pollen from the Bulaq area, especially the genera Foveotricolpites and Arecipites, though the flora also featured pteridophytes like ferns, aquatic plants and green algae. Gymnosperms like araucarias were also present, forming forests during high moisture periods, but they are generally rarer than the angiosperms. Accordingly, the environment has been proposed to have featured Overall this combination of plants suggests that the Formation experienced a warm and humid climate, possibly tropical or subtropical, though periods of somewhat dryer conditions may have also occurred. Lowlands would have been covered by palms, herbaceous ferns,hepatics and freshwater algae, while the araucariaceae forests occupying the dryer hinterlands. Preserved charcoal also suggests that the forests present were affected by wildfires.

At least two more crocodylomorphs have been recovered from the formation, namely a dyrosaurid, which are generally regarded as coastal marine animals, and a thoracosaur gavialoid. Dinosaurs were also present, namely in the form of some indetermined non-avian theropods and the sauropods Igai and Mansourasaurus.

=== Paleoecology ===
The generalized platyrostral snout shape, which Wahasuchus shares with a great many neosuchians including most modern crocodilians, was likely acquired convergently to these animals and would suggest a similar lifestyle. This suggests that it likely spend much of its time in the water and had opportunistic feeding preferences, its prey possibly including turtles, fish and various land vertebrates.
