= Teberemt Formation =

Geological formation in Mali

- Stratigraphic range: Middle to ?Late Palaeocene (Selandian to ?Thanetian); ~61.6–56.0 Ma
- Type: Geological formation
- Underlies: Tamaguélelt Formation

Lithology
- Primary: Phosphorite

Location
- Coordinates: 17.4°N 0.5°E
- Approximate paleocoordinates: 5.3°N 3.1°W
- Region: Er Rachidia
- Country: Mali,
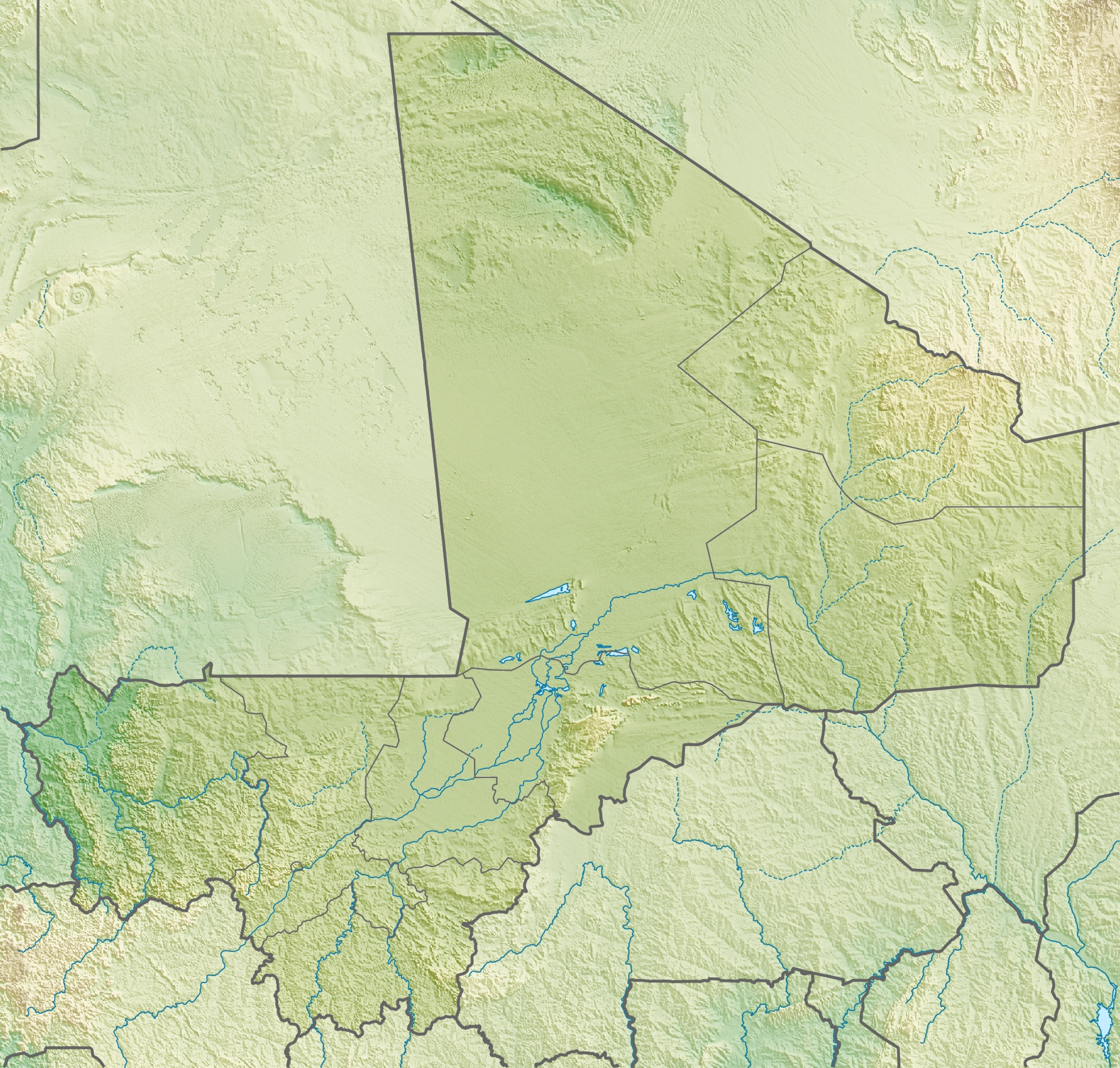
- Teberemt Formation (Mali)

The Teberemt Formation is a geological formation in Mali, West Africa. It dates to the middle to possibly the late Palaeocene epoch.

== Fossil Content ==
=== Testudines ===
Testudines from the Teberemt Formation
| Genus | Species | Material | Notes | Member | Images |
|---|---|---|---|---|---|
| Acleistochelys | A.maliensis | A nearly complete skull, shell fragments, pelvic fragments, and a cervical vertebra | A large Bothremydid Pleurodiran Turtle | | |
| Azabbaremys | A.moragjonesi | A skull | A botheremydid Pleurodiran Turtle related to Acleistochelys | | |

=== Crocodylomorphs ===
Crocodylomorphs from the Teberemt Formation
| Genus | Species | Material | Notes | Member | Images |
|---|---|---|---|---|---|
| Hyposaurus | H.sp | | A Dyrosaurid Crocodylomorph | | |
| Crocodylomorpha | Crocodylomorpha indet. | | | | |
