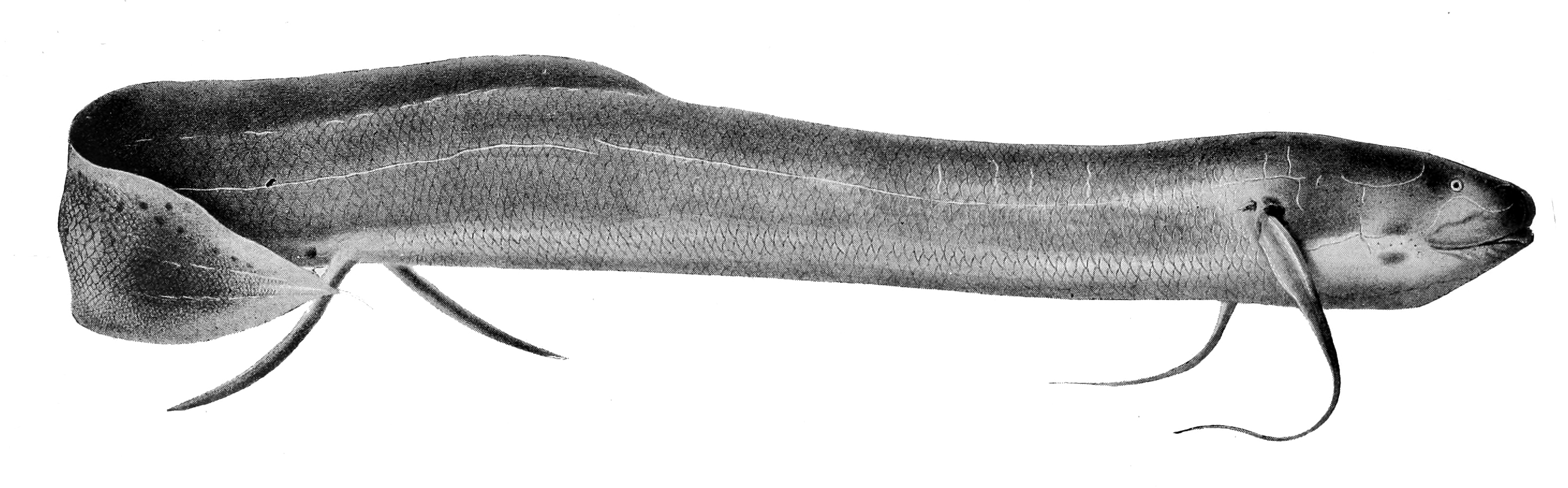

Conservation status
- Least Concern (IUCN 3.1)

Scientific classification
- Kingdom: Animalia
- Phylum: Chordata
- Class: Dipnoi
- Order: Ceratodontiformes
- Family: Protopteridae
- Genus: Protopterus
- Species: P. dolloi

Binomial name
- Protopterus dolloi Boulenger, 1900
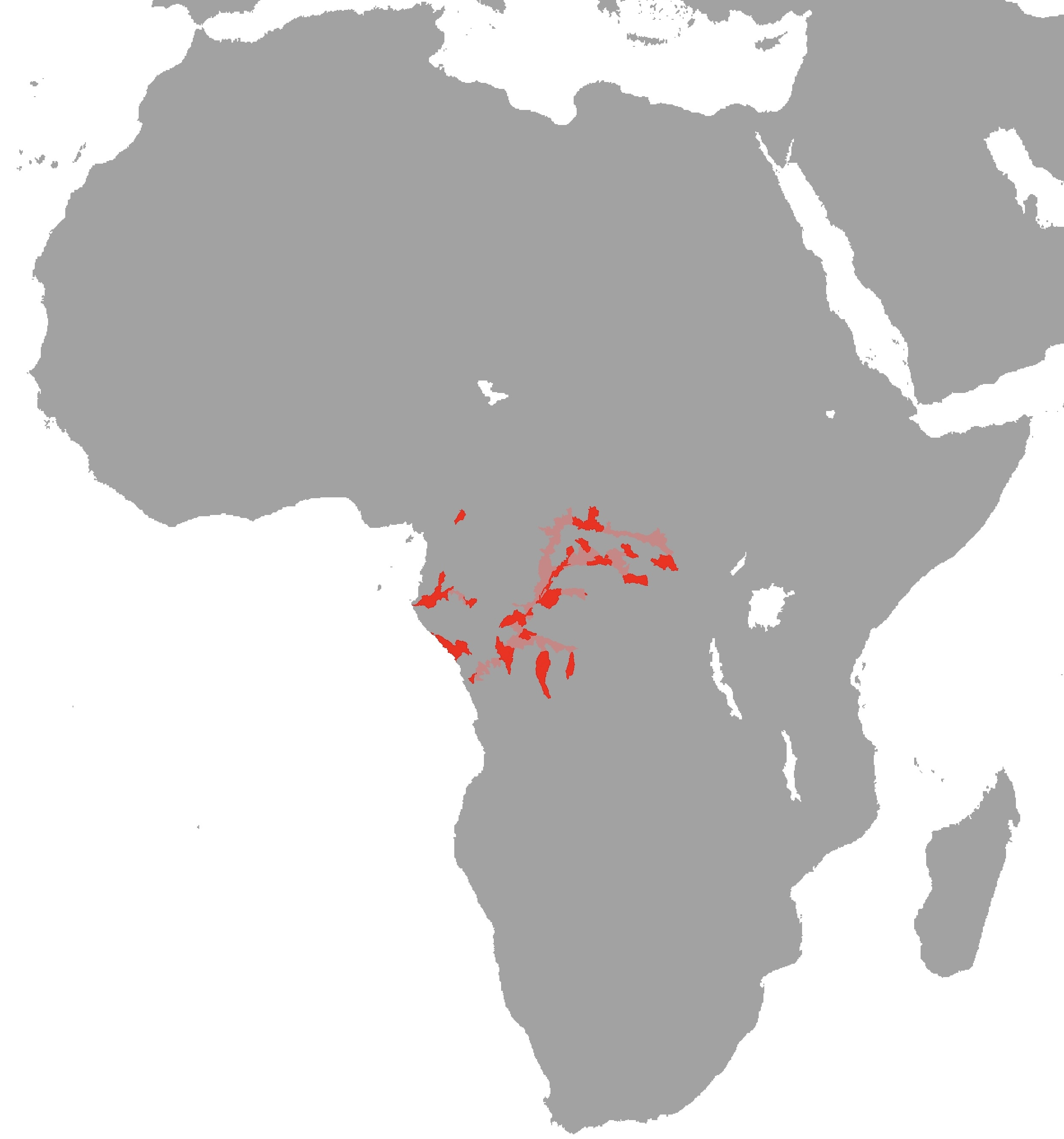

= Spotted lungfish =

Species of fish

The spotted lungfish or slender lungfish (Protopterus dolloi) is a species of lungfish from Middle Africa, where found in the Congo, Kouilou-Niari and Ogowe river basins. It is one of four extant species in the genus Protopterus.

== Habitat ==
The slender lungfish is a freshwater fish and it largely inhabits the middle and lower Congo River basin. It is a primarily demersal fish, dwelling in the riverbeds of the above basins and in Stanley Pool. During spawning season, females can be found in open water.

== Biology ==
The slender lungfish has an anguilliform body, much like an eel. The body of the slender lungfish is generally brown; young of the species oftentimes have black spots throughout the body, but adults generally lose these spots as they age. Like all African lungfish the slender lungfish is an obligate air-breather and is capable of aestivation; however, it generally does not aestivate. When it does aestivate, the lungfish creates a dry mucus cocoon on land. As most tropical fish are ammoniotelic, being on land can induce ammonia toxicity – with negative organismal and cellular level consequences – due to a lack of water to flush excreted ammonia from the gills and other cutaneous surfaces. Studies have shown that the slender lungfish has evolved the ability to reduce endogenous ammonia production, as well as an ornithine-urea cycle to increase the conversion rate of ammonia to less toxic urea, to defend against this toxicity.

== Reproduction ==
Spotted lungfish nests are generally found in June through October. During this time period the male makes a nest and buries it in mud, not unlike the marbled lungfish mating behavior. He guards both eggs and larvae during this time. The female does not take care of the young but rather during this time can be found open water in rivers within its range.
