= Khargachelys =

Khargachelys Temporal range: Late Campanian 75–73 Ma
- The holotype shell

Scientific classification
- Domain: Eukaryota
- Kingdom: Animalia
- Phylum: Chordata
- Class: Reptilia
- Order: Testudines
- Suborder: Pleurodira
- Family: †Bothremydidae
- Genus: †Khargachelys; Mohamed et al. 2023

Khargachelys is an extinct Bothremydid side-necked turtle from the Quseir Formation in Egypt.
