= Hyposaurus =

Hyposaurus Temporal range: Maastrichtian–Paleocene ~67–60 Ma

Scientific classification
- Kingdom: Animalia
- Phylum: Chordata
- Class: Reptilia
- Clade: Pseudosuchia
- Clade: Crocodylomorpha
- Family: †Dyrosauridae
- Genus: †Hyposaurus; Owen, 1849

Type species
- Hyposaurus rogersii Owen, 1849

Species
- †H. derbianus Cope 1886; †H. nopcsai Swinton 1930; †H. paucidens Arambourg 1952; †H. rogersii Owen 1849; †H. wilsoni Swinton 1930

Extinct genus of reptiles

Hyposaurus is a genus of extinct marine dyrosaurid crocodyliform. Fossils have been found in Paleocene aged rocks of the Iullemmeden Basin in West Africa, Campanian–Maastrichtian (Late Cretaceous) Shendi Formation of Sudan and Maastrichtian (Late Cretaceous) through Danian (Early Paleocene) strata in New Jersey, Alabama and South Carolina. With an Indeterminate species from the Mid to Late Palaeocene Teberemt Formation of Mali. Isolated teeth comparable to Hyposaurus have also been found in Thanetian (Late Paleocene) strata of Virginia. It was related to Dyrosaurus. The priority of the species H. rogersii has been debated, however there is no sound basis for the recognition of more than one species from North America. The other North American species (i.e. H. fraterculus, H. ferox and H. natator) are therefore considered nomina vana (i.e. empty names).

== Introduction ==
Hyposaurus is an extinct reptile whose fossils are found in marine sediments from the Maastrichtian (latest Cretaceous age) to the Danian (earliest Paleocene age). It is a mesosuchian crocodyliform in the family Dyrosauridae. It is closely related to dyrosaurs and congosaurs (Schwarz-Wings). The earliest fossils were found in North America, and they were later discovered in Africa and South America. The genus is believed to have originated in Africa. Hyposaurus lived in a shallow, near shore marine environment and has many aquatic adaptations In 2009, the disorganized phylogeny of crocodyliforms was treated and reliable diagnostic traits established, but remaining questions are unanswered.

== Early discoveries ==
Owen first recognized the genus in 1849. This first fossil was two amphicoelous vertebrae, vertebrae with two concave sides of the centrum, discovered by Professor Henry Roger. It was found in the greensand beds in New Jersey, currently the site of the Edelman Fossil Park and Museum. The different greensand beds of New Jersey represent a complete record from the Cretaceous to the Paleocene. They are estimated to cover 10,000 square miles (26,000 km^{2}) of sea floor but are limited on land to coastal environments. In honor of professor Roger, Owen named this new fossil Hyposaurus rogersii. The genus name is meant to describe the unique "hypapophyseal keel extended on the ventral surface of the centrum". This is an extension of the vertebrae centrum which point down towards the belly, similar to a boat keel. The second fossil find was by Cope in 1886. This fossil was found in Brazil and comprises a left molar, quadratojugal bone, a lower jaw, many vertebrae from the middle to posterior parts of the column, a humerus, a coracoid bone, teeth, and several other bones. It had been hypothesized Hyposaurus was related to Teleosaurus and this fossil evidence allowed Cope to propose Hyposaurus was part of the family Teleosauridae. The differences between Hyposaurus and Teleosaurus are described as "the robust size and vertical direction" of the teeth of Hyposaurus, as well as Hyposaurus had hypapophyses on more dorsal vertebrae than Teleosaurus, which only has these on the first and second dorsal vertebrae. Cope remarks the characteristics of H. rogersii and his new specimen are very similar, but the articular faces of the centrum are less concave than H. rogersii. The species was named Hyposaurus derbianus after professor Orville Derby, the director of the department of Geology at the National Museum of Brazil.

== Description ==
In 2006, Schwarz and colleagues, described the postcranial skeletons of new specimens of Hyposaurus, focusing mostly on the vertebrae. From partial skeletons a proatlas, atlas, axis, a third to ninth cervical vertebrae, and at least 16 dorsal, two sacral, and 45 caudal vertebrae have been reconstructed. The vertebrae are weakly amphicoelous, meaning both sides of the centrum are concave. The dorsal shield is made of two columns of paravertebral osteoderms and two lateral columns of accessory osteoderms. At least 12 horizontal rows of these make up the shield.

The three main differences between the axial skeletons of Hyposaurus and modern crocodylians are the tall neural spines, vertically oriented thoracic ribs and osteoderm which lack external keels. This indicates that they also have a different epiaxial musculature (muscles above the axial skeleton). Along with the specialized osteoderm morphology, Hyposaurus probably had a specialized trunk bracing system which suggests that individuals with low body mass could have only high walked or galloped.

== Distribution ==
Locations of Hyposaurus fossil discoveries
Thanetian/Clarkforkian
Early Paleocene
Maastrichtian
Campanian

Fossils of Hyposaurus have been found in North and South America and Africa. There is evidence supporting presence of the genus Hyposaurus in Africa where the Dryosauridae originated. Dispersal into the New World is hypothesized to have taken place during the Late Cretaceous or Early Paleocene. Hastings proposed three independent dispersal events of the dyrosaurid clade. These findings show a clear Atlantic focus in fossil distribution. Hyposaurus is believed to have been the only amphicoelous crocodylian in North America. It lasted long enough to live alongside the modern procoelous crocodylians which most other amphicoelous crocodylians did not.

Age	Formation	Location	Refs
Clarkforkian	Williamsburg Formation	South Carolina	
Thanetian	Aquia Formation	Virginia	
Thanetian	Teberemt Formation	Mali	
Danian	Clayton Formation	Alabama	
Danian	Hornerstown Formation	New Jersey	
Danian	Maria Farinha Formation	Brazil	
Paleocene	Teberemt Formation	Mali	
Paleocene	Dange Formation	Nigeria	
Paleocene	Schistes papyraces Formation	Niger	
Paleocene	Umm Himar Formation	Saudi Arabia	
Late Maastrichtian	Hornerstown Formation	New Jersey	
Late Maastrichtian	New Egypt Formation	New Jersey	
Campanian	Shendi Formation	Sudan	
Campanian	Monmouth Group	Maryland	

== Taxonomy ==
- - - Protosuchia
      Orthosuchus
    - Mesoeucrocodylia
      - Protosuchus
      - Hemiprotosuchus
    - - Gobiosuchus
      - - Shantungosuchus
        - Sichuanosuchus
  - - Hsisosuchus
    - - Baurusuchus
      - - Sebecus
        - - - - Pelagosaurus
              - - Teleosauridae
                - Metriorhynchidae
            - Pholidosaurus
            - - Terminonaris
              - Dyrosauridae
                - Dyrosaurus
                - Hyposaurus

Hyposaurus was a mesosuchian crocodyliform reptile and a member of the family Dyrosauridae (Denton,. There is a disputed phylogeny with many interpretations. Some paleontologists interpret that Dyrosaurids, Congosaurus, and Acherontisuchus are sister taxa of Hyposaurus.

== Paleobiology and paleoecology ==
Hyposaurus probably lived in marine environments, mostly in shallow water and in near-shore environments. Hyposaurus had many aquatic adaptations, including pelvic and tail propulsion and light scute armor. In addition, its tail was long, both eyes were on the side of the head, and the snout was long with many uniform teeth. The feet were not paddle-formed, a trait rather similar to modern crocodiles. The short transverse process on the caudal vertebrae implies the tail did not move vertically, indicating that Hyposaurus was not a diving animal. Moreover, Dyrosaurids generally are hypothesized to have pitch correction where the pleural cavity is pushed towards the back side to produce a more horizontal stance while submerged in water. Hyposaurus foraged in their marine environments and used the protection of the water column. Buffetaut proposed Dyrosaurids laid their eggs on land and only after they have fully grown moved to coastal waters. Under this hypothesis, the young would live on land or in shallow fresh water environments. This could explain the fossil finds of smaller dyrosaurid specimens in Pakistan in freshwater sediments. This Hyposaurus hypothesis has been debated as there is still a significant amount of variation among the Pakistani Dyrosaurid specimens.

== Later research ==
In 2006 Schwarz and colleagues, described the postcranial skeletons of new specimens of Hyposaurus, focusing mostly on the vertebrae. From partial skeletons, a proatlas, atlas, axis, a third to ninth cervical vertebrae, and at least 16 dorsal, two sacral, and 45 caudal vertebrae have been reconstructed. The vertebrae are weakly amphicoelous, meaning both sides of the centrum are concave. The dorsal shield is made of two columns of paravertebral osteoderms and two lateral columns of accessory osteoderms. At least 12 horizontal rows of these make up the shield.

Citing vague distinctions, Jove and colleagues, attempted to reclassify the genus Hyposaurus based on diagnostic characteristics and sort of taxonomic troubles. Flattening of the mandibular symphysis, used previously to distinguish between species, is not confirmed and only can be used to distinguish between Hyposaurus and Congosaurus. Currently, width height ratio of teeth in different positions are being used to distinguish between species. The little variation between the species Hyposaurus wilsoni and Hyposaurus nopcsai, means one of the two is a nomen dubium (Latin: "doubtful name"), although fossil evidence does suggest two species. The paper focuses on the at least 5 species of Hyposaurus or Congosaurus known from the Paleocene of the Iullemmeden Basin of Western Africa (Mali, Niger, Nigeria). The authors suggest using skull characteristics instead of mandibular characteristics for taxonomic distinctions because skulls are usually better preserved.

A paper by Hastings and colleagues described a new skull of a dyrosaurid crocodyliform, found in the Cerrejón Formation of northern Colombia. They used mandibular and cranial characteristics to map it onto a cladogram with Hyposaurus and other taxa. Analysis supports an African origin to Dyrosauridae, with dispersal and radiation in South America in the Late Cretaceous or very early Paleocene. This specimen of dyrosaurid is the smallest of the family Dyrosauridae found to date, with Hyposaurus rogersii being a contender for the next smallest.

In 2016, Salih and colleagues reported the first Hyposaurus fossil found in the Campanian to Maastrichtian Shendi Formation of Sudan. It was identified as a Hyposaurus based on the flat shape of the mandible (lower jawbone) and the elliptical shape of the mandibular symphysis (median line ridge of mandible). The African member occurs in the Late Cretaceous, which supports the idea that Hyposaurus originated in Africa. This fossil is different from other specimens of Hyposaurus because it has a larger eighth alveolus (bony socket for tooth root), smaller interveolar space between the ninth and tenth alveoli, and a ridge along the dorsal side of the mandible.
