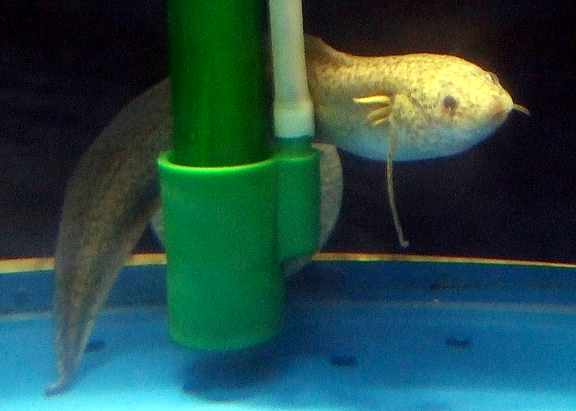

Conservation status
- Least Concern (IUCN 3.1)

Scientific classification
- Kingdom: Animalia
- Phylum: Chordata
- Class: Dipnoi
- Order: Ceratodontiformes
- Family: Protopteridae
- Genus: Protopterus
- Species: P. amphibius

Binomial name
- Protopterus amphibius (Peters 1844)
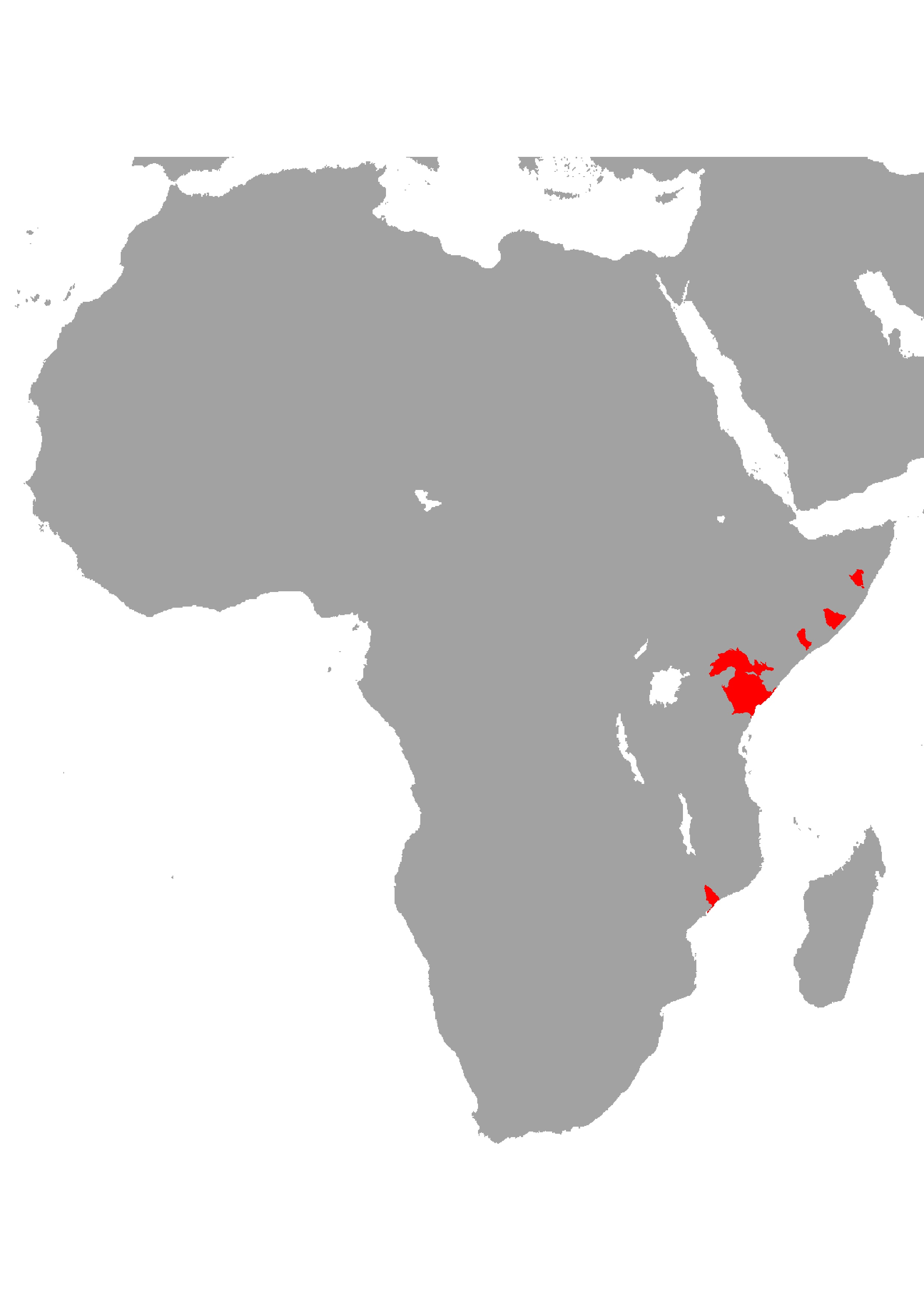

Synonyms
- Rhinocryptis amphibia Peters 1844

= Gilled lungfish =

Species of fish

The gilled lungfish (Protopterus amphibius), also known as the East African lungfish, is a species of African lungfish. It is native to Kenya, Somalia and Mozambique. Records from Tanzania require confirmation and may be the result of introductions.

== Taxonomy ==
Protopterus amphibius was named in 1844 by German naturalist Wilhelm Peters and is synonymous with Rhinocryptis amphibia. The gilled lungfish is part of the Protopteridae family and in the order of Lepidosireniformes. Protopterus amphibius is most closely related to the other three species of African lungfish in the Protopteridae family. Protopteridae are sister groups with tetrapod vertebrates.

== Description ==
Protopterus amphibius has an elongate body which reaches a length of 44cm (17 in), making it the smallest extant lungfish. It has fused dorsal-caudal-anal fins and small cycloid scales. This lungfish is uniform blue or slate grey in colour. It has small inconspicuous black spots and a pale grey belly.

Near the ventral snout, the gilled lungfish has paired olfactory organs containing lamellae and a nasal sac allowing water takeup in shallow water or wet land. Their heavy tooth plates give them a unique jaw morphology, often used for identification. While it shares many anatomical features with other African lungfish, its size makes it easy identifiable.

== Ventilation ==
Like all African lungfish, the gilled lungfish has two lungs, six gill arches, and five gill clefts. It is an obligate airbreather and can survive dry spells through aestivation, a burrowing process in which it creates a protective mucous cocoon. Aestivation involves reduction of the lungfish's metabolic rate and requires usage of stored fuel, and is therefore a type of dormancy induced by the dry season. Both its gills and its lungs are used for ventilation, with frequency of each dependent on ambient gas tensions. Gill and lung usage is stimulated by hypoxia and hypercapnia individually, and depressed by hyperoxia and hypocapnia individually. Combinations of hypoxia and hypercapnia depress gill usage and increase lung usage. Generally, African lungfish become less dependent on gill usage as they mature.

== Life history ==
Apart from increased dependency on external gills in juveniles, nothing is known about the breeding biology of Protopterus amphibius or the biology of the young. The three other members of Protopterus spawn in nests whose structure is influenced by environmental factors. These three species exhibit parental care for their young. African lungfish have a lifespan of about 18 years in captivity; there is no information about the lifespan of wild African lungfish. Little is known about the feeding habits of Protopterus amphibius specifically, but the feeding habits of other Protopterus suggest the gilled lungfish may be an omnivorous carnivore feeding on invertebrates and plant material. They likely use olfaction to locate prey and likely slowly stalk their prey until it is close enough for suction. Protopterus species ingest food through a process of chewing, spitting out, and sucking back in their prey.

== Habitat ==
The gilled lungfish resides in inland freshwater ecosystems in tropical zones. It lives largely within the riverbeds of the Zambezi River system of East Africa and the region's wetlands. It is a primarily demersal fish. Its abundance is relatively unknown.

== Conservation ==
Fisheries for Protopterus species are located in Uganda and Kenya. The gilled lungfish is a species of Least Concern on the IUCN Red List because of its wide distribution and lack of major threats, although their data deficiency should be noted. The largest threats to the gilled lungfish are the damming of the Zambezi, which will reduce the size of the delta they inhabit, pollution in areas they inhabit, and habitat reduction due to agricultural encroachment on wetlands.
