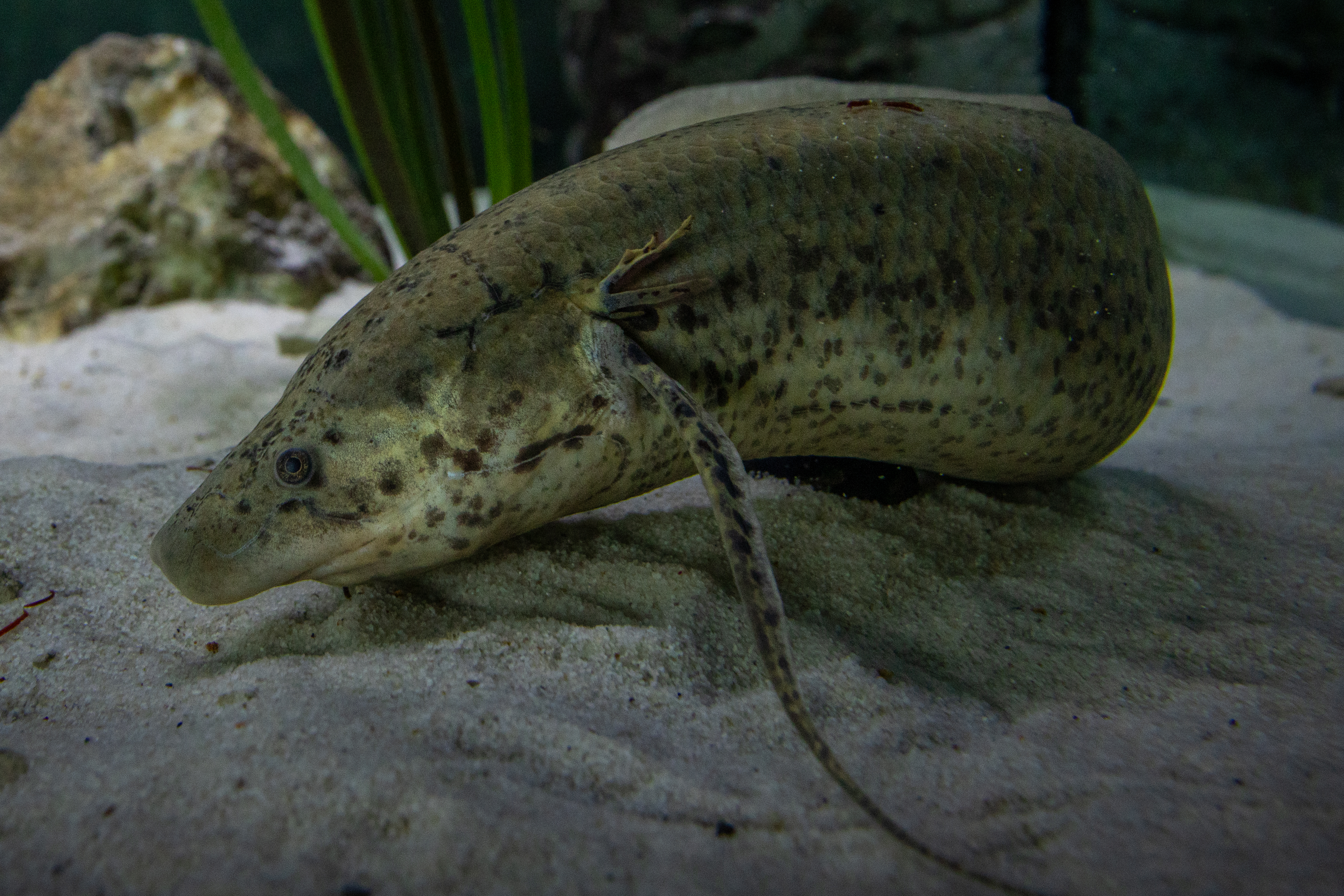

Conservation status
- Least Concern (IUCN 3.1)

Scientific classification
- Kingdom: Animalia
- Phylum: Chordata
- Class: Dipnoi
- Order: Ceratodontiformes
- Family: Protopteridae
- Genus: Protopterus
- Species: P. annectens

Binomial name
- Protopterus annectens (Owen, 1839)

Subspecies
- Protopterus annectens brieni
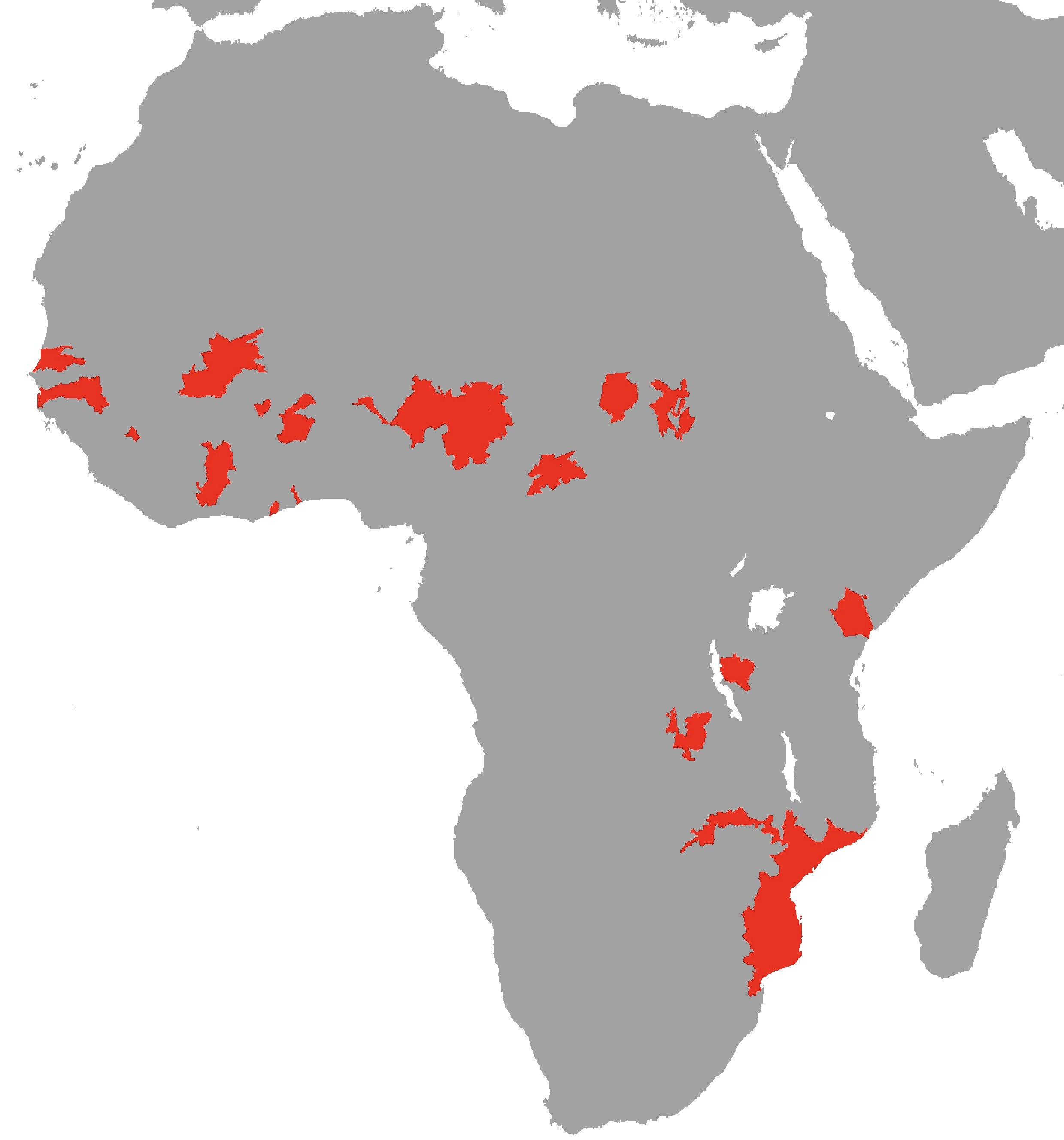

Synonyms
- Lepidosiren annectens Owen 1839; Protomelus annectens (Owen 1839); Lepidosiren tobal de Castelnau 1855; Protopterus anguilliformis Owen 1841; Rhinocryptis annectens (Owen 1839); Protopterus rhinocryptis Gray, 1850

= West African lungfish =

Species of fish

The West African lungfish (Protopterus annectens), also known as the Tana lungfish or simply African lungfish, is a species of African lungfish. It is found in a wide range of freshwater habitats in West and Central Africa, as well as the northern half of Southern Africa.

== Description ==
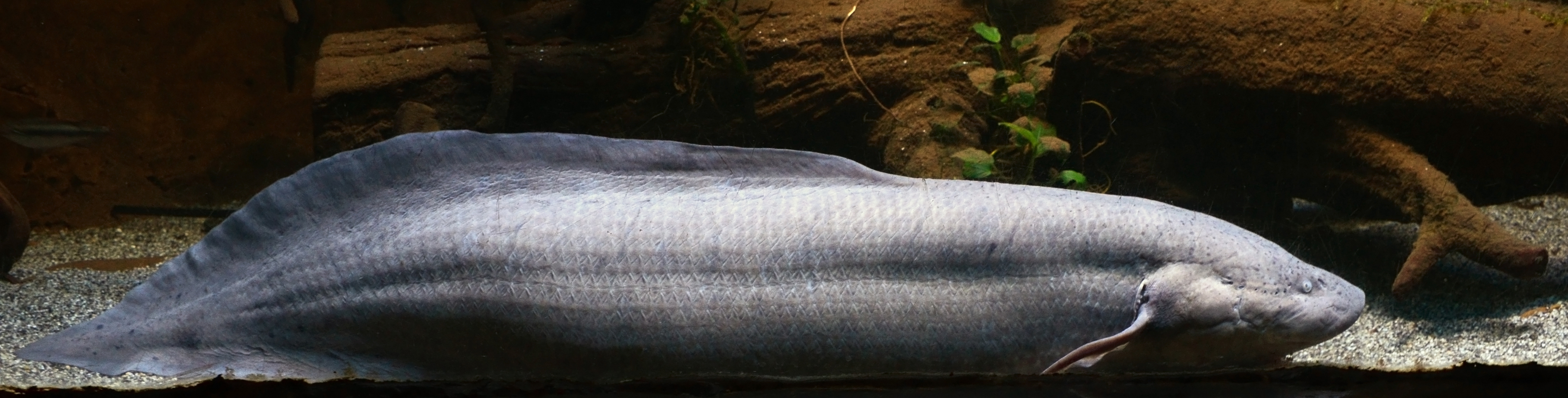
A West African lungfish showing its elongated, eel-like body and whip-like pelvic fins.

Protopterus annectens is a member of the lungfish, a group thought to have existed for over 400 million years. This species has various physiological adaptations which allow it to survive periods of drought, making the lungfish resilient in many habitats. P. annectens is known for its eel-like appearance with an anguilliform body. It has pelvic fins that are described as "whip-like" with skeletal elements. It has a prominent snout and small eyes that are known to be partially blind. Although their eyesight is not well-developed, they have sensory structures called lateral lines. These structures allow them to detect water movement. These sensory receptors extend along the snout of the animal, similar to those found in amphibians and other fish.

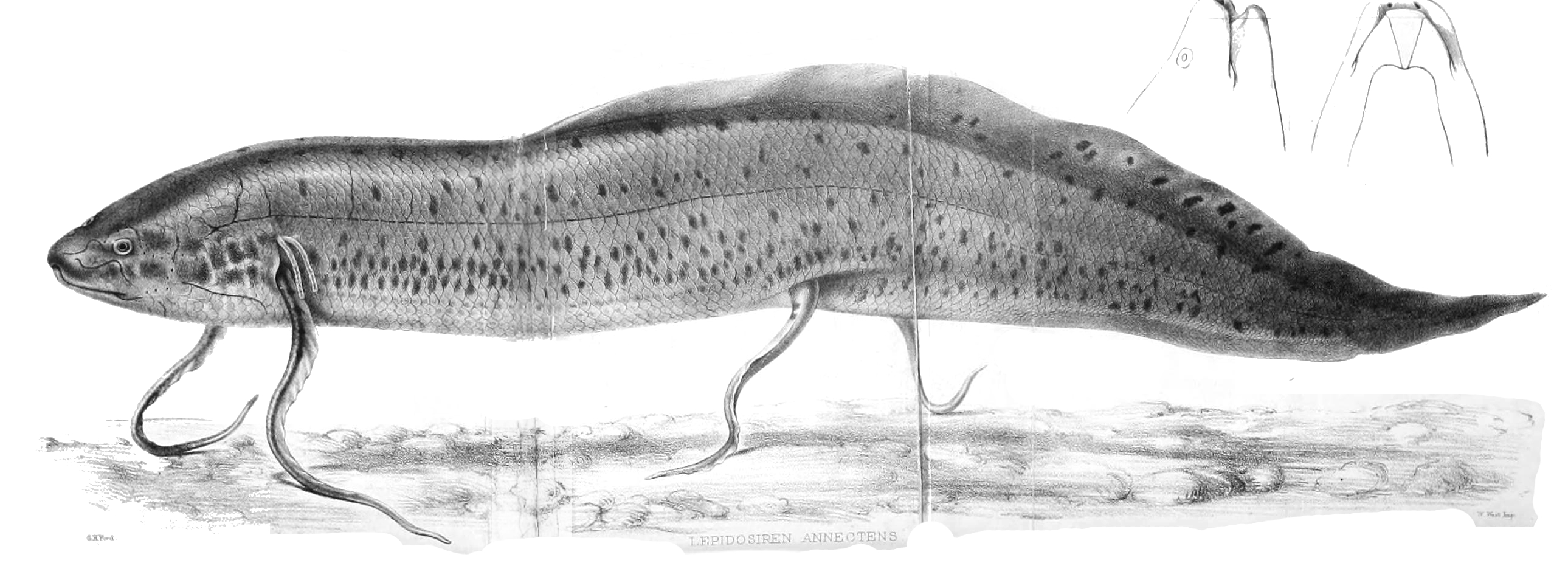

Its body is about 9–15 times the length of the head. It has two pairs of long, filamentous fins. The pectoral fins have a basal fringe and are about three times the head length, while its pelvic fins are about twice the head length. In general, three external gills are inserted posterior to the gill slits and above the pectoral fins.

It has cycloid scales embedded in the skin. About 40–50 scales occur between the operculum and the anus, and 36–40 around the body before the origin of the dorsal fin. It has 34–37 pairs of ribs. The dorsal side is olive or brown in color and the ventral side is lighter, with great blackish or brownish spots on the body and fins except on its belly. West African lungfish can grow up to 1 meter long (3.3 feet) and weigh up to 4 kilograms (9 pounds).

The West African lungfish also has another subspecies; P. a. brieni, which is found primarily in southern Africa near the Zambezi, Pungwe and Sabi rivers. The West African lungfish is often confused with the South American lungfish (Lepidosiren paradoxa), which shares similar physical traits, such as paired lungs and burrowing behavior. Despite these similarities, they differ in that the South American lungfish is slimmer and has shorter pelvic fins, whereas P. annectens has longer pelvic fins. It is believed that L. paradoxa and P. annectens diverged during the Cretaceous period, as they share a common phylogeny.

== Evolutionary history ==
The West African lungfish is historically known as a unique species and an early precursor of fish to tetrapods. Due to its monophyletic clade, Dipnoi, it is the sister group to the tetrapods; this is attributed to its distinctive physiology and inferred data from fossil and taxa records.

== Biology and diet ==
P. annectens is unique due to its ability to use its pelvic fin as a "foot" to lift its body off substrate. The lungfish has a range of gaits that include both overlapping and non-overlapping fin contacts, allowing it to have movement patterns that resemble walking. However, this doesn't mean it uses its pelvic fins to walk on land entirely; it is exclusively used to lift itself underwater. Although these animals occasionally travel on land, moving from puddle to puddle to stay moisturized, they do not walk on land in the manner of tetrapods.

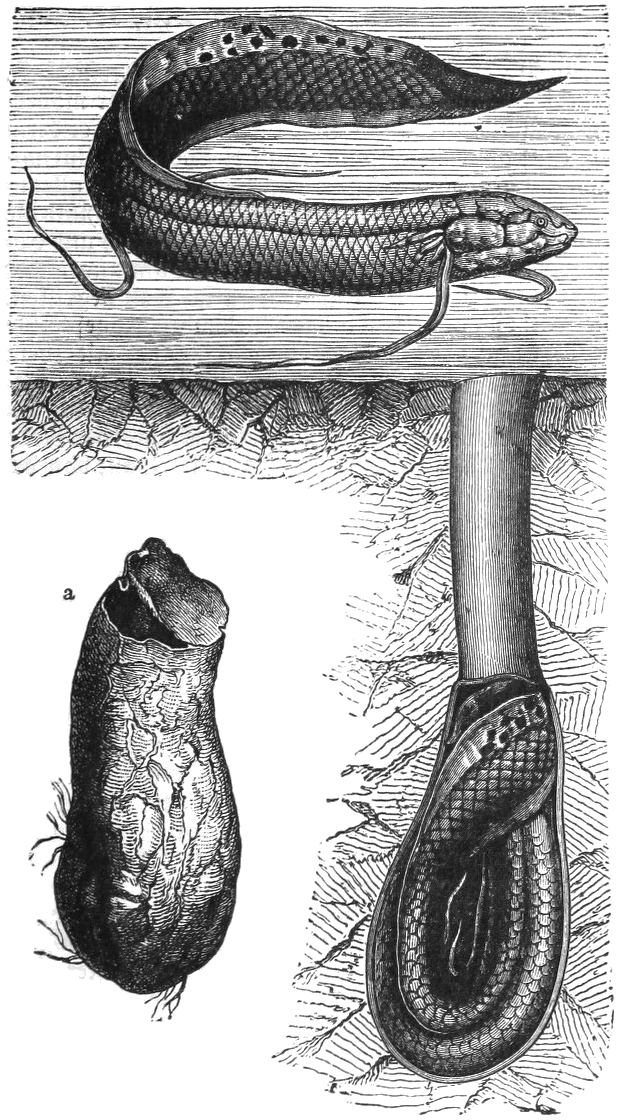

The west African lungfish also has the ability to breathe atmospheric air by rising to the water's surface and taking a gulp of air, which it must do every half an hour or so to survive. While they do possess internal gills, their secondary lamellae collapse during estivation leading to total dependence on the lungs for atmospheric respiration. Specifically, the third and fourth gill arches possess filaments and receive venous blood supply. The three paired external gills are epidermal outgrowths with core blood vessels.

The African lungfish has an omnivorous diet, consisting of various fish, earthworms, plants, and even crustaceans. They also have strong jaws designed to crush prey and powerful suction abilities, which enable them to sift through mud and capture prey. The lungfish can also go for up to 3 1/2 years without any food intake whatsoever. During this time period the lung fish enters a dormancy stage called aestivation, which is similar to hibernation but occurs in the summer instead of winter. To begin aestivation it buries itself in the mud about 12–18 inches deep. As the mud dries, it releases a copious amount of mucus, forming a cocoon that eventually hardens and protects them from the environment, preventing dehydration. The fish then has no direct contact with the outside environment; however, a tube of dried mucus goes into the pharynx of the fish and allows the fish to breathe. The lungfish usually relies on protein for energy, so the nitrogenous waste of amino acids is converted to urea, which builds up in the tissues and is only excreted when the lungfish returns to the water.

== Habitat and distribution ==
The West African lungfish is distributed throughout Africa typically, it can be found in freshwater swamps, backwaters, and small rivers in West and South Africa. It has also been reported in African countries such as Senegal, Niger, Gambia, Western Sudan, Côte d'Ivoire, Sierra Leone, Guinea, and many others. Like other African lungfish, the West African lungfish is an obligate air breather and a freshwater-dwelling fish. It is demersal, meaning that it lives primarily buried within riverbeds. Within its habitat, dry seasons are frequent, causing the rivers and floodplains to dry up. During these periods, the West African lungfish can aestivate for up to a year.

== Reproduction ==
The reproductive life of the African lungfish consists of building nests to lay their eggs during the wet season. The eggs, about 4mm in diameter, are cared for by the males. About a week after being laid, the eggs hatch, and the males continue to care for the larvae for about two months. During this larval development, their gills are absorbed and transformed into fully developed lungs. Once mature, the young develop fused tooth plates to chew their food, a feature uncommon in most fish. When it comes to breeding in captivity, it is relatively hard to do, as well as being able to get a female to lay eggs. A female in captivity will lay approximately 200 eggs. The eggs will have a transparent membrane acting as a protective coat. Healthy eggs will be white on the outside with a bubblegum pink inside.

== Conservation status and human interaction ==
According to the IUCN, the West African lungfish is currently categorized as being of least concern. However, population density, habitat range, and overall population estimates are not entirely known, as more research is needed on this species' population. Furthermore, the African lungfish is commonly used for food consumption in many African regions. In Ugandan fish markets, African lungfish can frequently be found. According to some studies, Uganda caught between 15,000 and 22,000 tons of lungfish from 1976 to 1985, but this number decreased from 1985 to 1989. In Kenya, around 1,000 to 3,000 tons have been caught over four decades, but catches have decreased since 2005. According to the same study, many locals in Africa claim that the lungfish are sought for their various benefits, such as treating lactation problems in women, alcoholism, enhancing sexual performance in men, and boosting the immune system.
