= Continental Terminal Formation =

Geological formation in Western Africa

- Stratigraphic range: ?Eocene to Pleistocene; ~56–1 Ma
- Type: Geological formation
- Overlies: Tamaguélelt Formation
- Area: Sahara Desert
- Thickness: up to

Lithology
- Primary: Sandstone

Location
- Continental Terminal Formation (Africa)

The Continental Terminal Formation is a geological formation in West Africa that was deposited during the Palaeogene to Quaternary Periods (Eocene to Pleistocene Epochs).

== Description ==
The formation outcrops in the West African countries of Mali, Nigeria, Niger, Benin, Togo, the Ivory Coast, Mauritania, Senegal, and Chad.

== Fossil content ==
Proboscideans from the Continental Teriminal Formation
| Genus | Species | Material | Notes | Member | Images |
|---|---|---|---|---|---|
| Moeritherium | M.sp | | An early Proboscidean | | Moeritherium |

Bivalves from the Continental Teriminal Formation
| Genus | Species | Material | Notes | Member | Images |
|---|---|---|---|---|---|
| Cubitostrea | C. multicostata | | | | |
