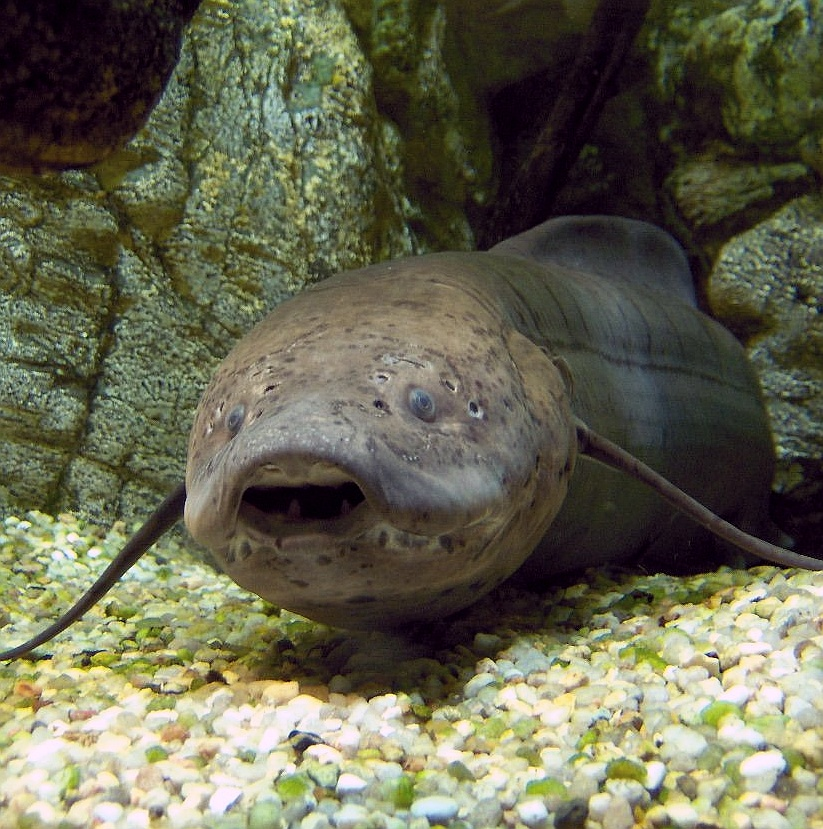
- Protopterus annectens

Scientific classification
- Kingdom: Animalia
- Phylum: Chordata
- Class: Dipnoi
- Order: Ceratodontiformes
- Family: Protopteridae; Peters, 1855
- Genus: Protopterus; Owen, 1839

Species
- P. aethiopicus; P. amphibius; P. annectens; P. dolloi
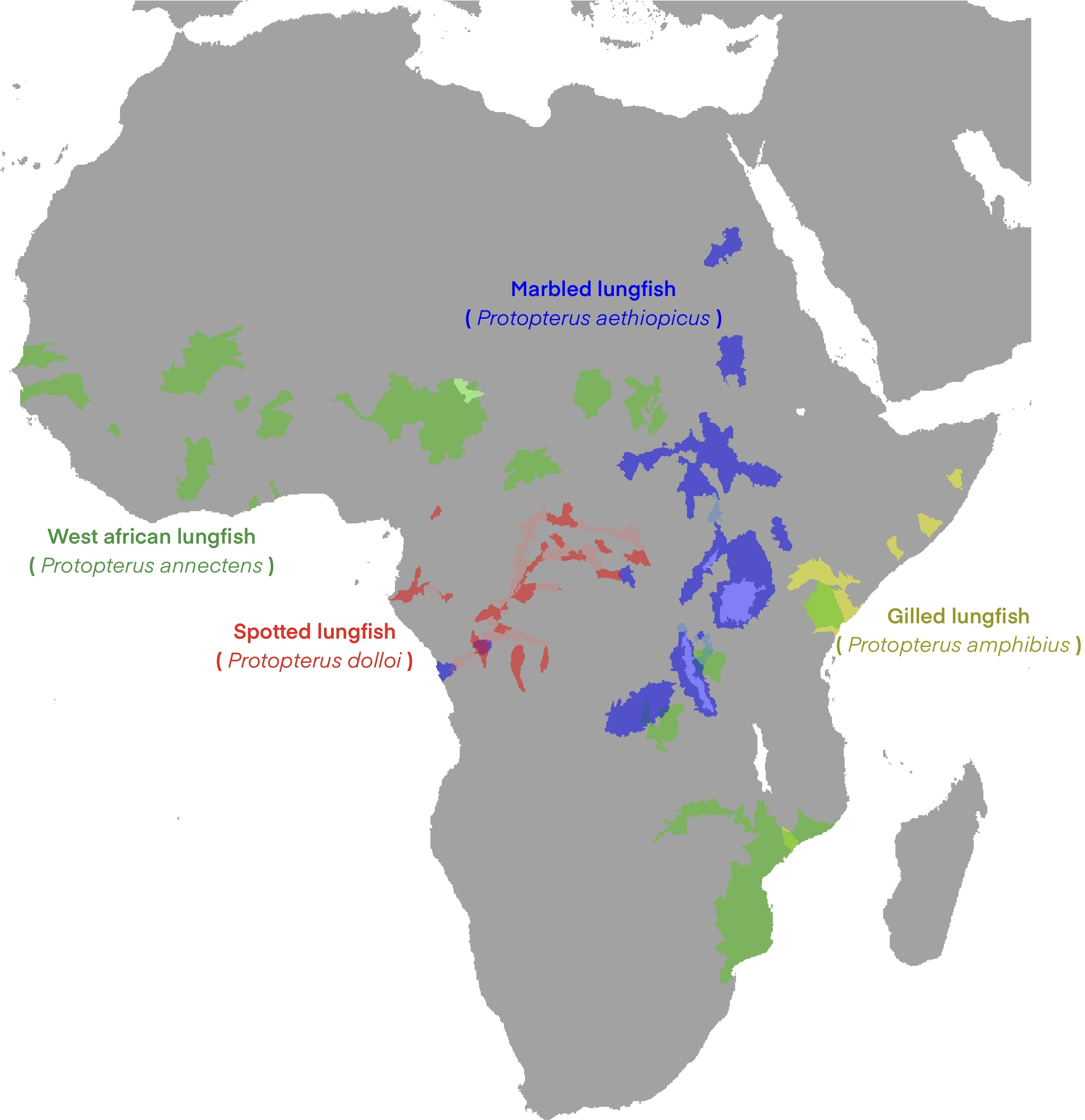

Synonyms
- Protomelus Hogg 1841; Rhinocryptis Peters 1844

= Protopterus =

African lungfish Temporal range: 83.6–0 Ma Campanian to present

Genus of Lungfish

Protopterus is the genus of four species of lungfish found in Africa. Protopterus is considered the sole genus in the family Protopteridae, which is grouped with Lepidosiren in the order Lepidosireniformes.

== Taxonomy ==
The earliest fossils of the Protopteridae come from the Late Cretaceous (Campanian-Maastrichtian) of Sudan, but phylogenetic evidence indicates that it and Lepidosirenidae split at the very beginning of the Early Cretaceous, around 145 Ma. Together, their common ancestor diverged from the only other extant lungfishes in Neoceratodontidae during the Late Jurassic.

Some papers suggest grouping Protopterus and Lepidosiren together in the family Lepidosirenidae, as their Cretaceous divergence is relatively recent compared to the Carboniferous origins of other lungfish families. However, most taxonomic authorities retain them as distinct families.

== Description ==
African lungfish are elongated, eel-like fishes with thread-like pectoral and pelvic fins. They have soft scales, and the dorsal and tail fins are fused into a single structure. They can either swim like eels or crawl along the bottom using their pectoral and pelvic fins. The largest species can reach about 200 cm (6.6 ft) in length.

African lungfish generally inhabit shallow waters, such as swamps and marshes. They are also found in larger lakes such as Lake Victoria. They can survive out of water for many months by burrowing into hardened mud beneath a dried stream bed. They are carnivorous, feeding on crustaceans, aquatic insect larvae, and molluscs.

== Biology ==
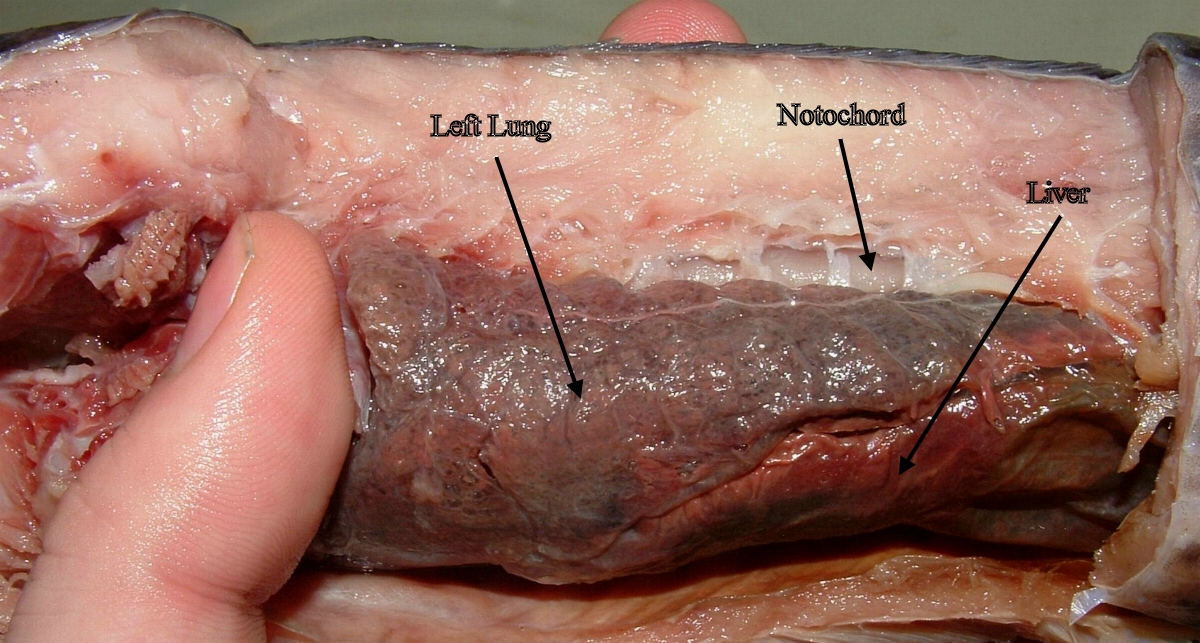
Lateral view of lungs of a dissected Protopterus dolloi

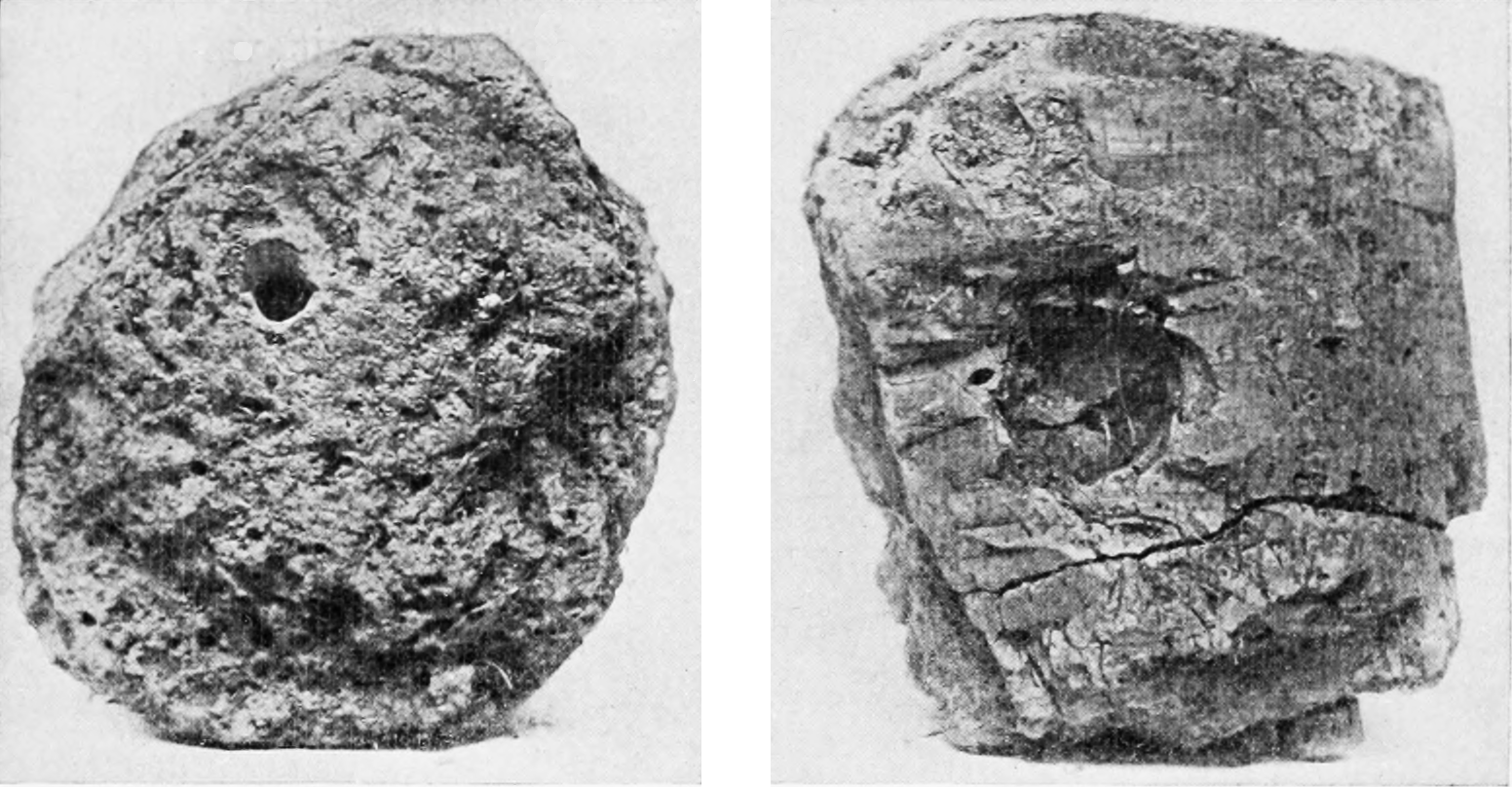
Clod of mud containing the cocoon of lung fish

The African lungfish is an example of how the evolutionary transition from breathing water to breathing air can occur. Lungfish are periodically exposed to water with low oxygen content or encounter situations in which their aquatic environment dries up. To cope with these conditions, they have developed an adaptation in the form of an outpocketing of the gut, similar to the swim bladder found in other fishes. This specialized structure functions as a lung. Within the lung, numerous thin-walled blood vessels allow the blood to absorb oxygen from the air that is gulped into the lung.

They are obligate air breathers, with reduced gills in the adults. There are two anterior gill arches that retain gills, though they are too small to function as the sole respiratory apparatus, and may be more important for carbon dioxide elimination. About 90% of their oxygen is acquired via their lungs, and the remaining ~10% via the gills and skin. The lungfish heart has adaptations that partially separate the flow of blood into its pulmonary and systemic circuits. The atrium is partially divided, so that the left side receives oxygenated blood and the right side receives deoxygenated blood from the other tissues. These two blood streams remain mostly separate as they flow through the ventricle leading to the gill arches. As a result, oxygenated blood mostly goes to the anterior gill arches and the deoxygenated blood mostly goes to the posterior arches.

African lungfishes breed at the beginning of the rainy season. They construct nests or burrows in the mud to hold their eggs, which they then guard against predators. When they hatch, the young resemble tadpoles, with external gills, and only later develop lungs and begin to breathe air.

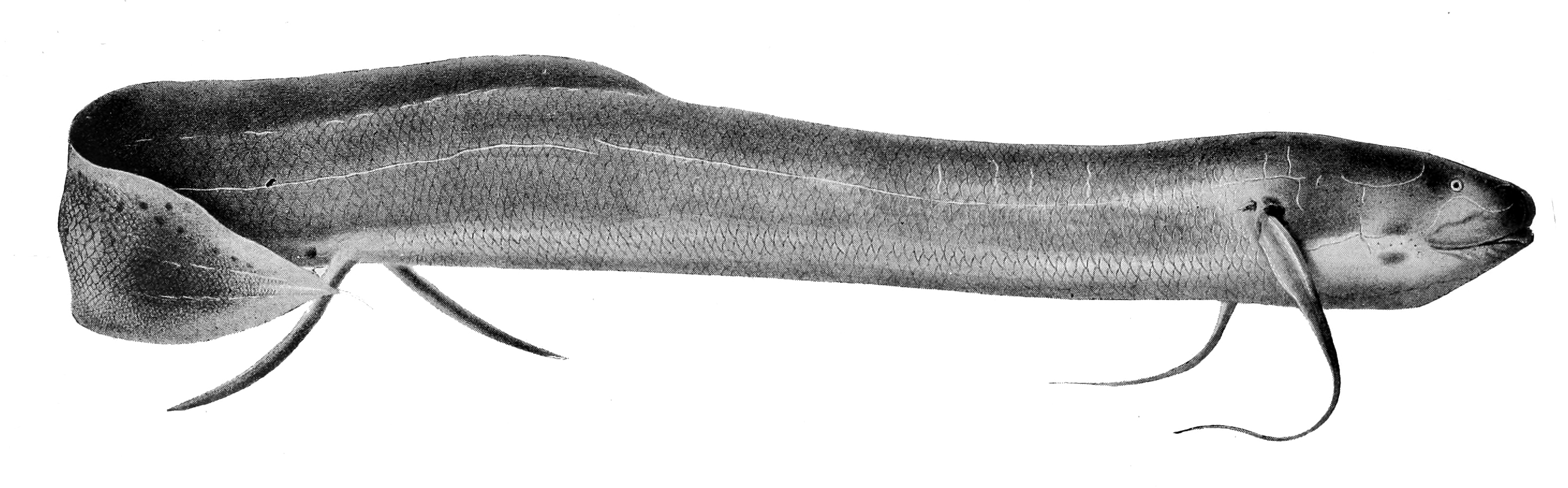
Spotted African lungfish, Protopterus dolloi

== As food ==
Until the introduction of the Nile perch to the region, lungfish typically comprised a small proportion of a fisherman's catch. Transportation to market from catching sites in Lake Victoria was often done with fish sun-dried for better preservation. Human consumption of the lungfish varies by population; the Luo peoples occasionally do so but the Sukuma avoid eating lungfish due to a taste which is "locally either highly appreciated or strongly disliked." As technology advancements such as longlines and gillnets have been increasingly applied over the past 50 years, the lungfish populations there are believed to be decreasing.

== Species and subspecies ==
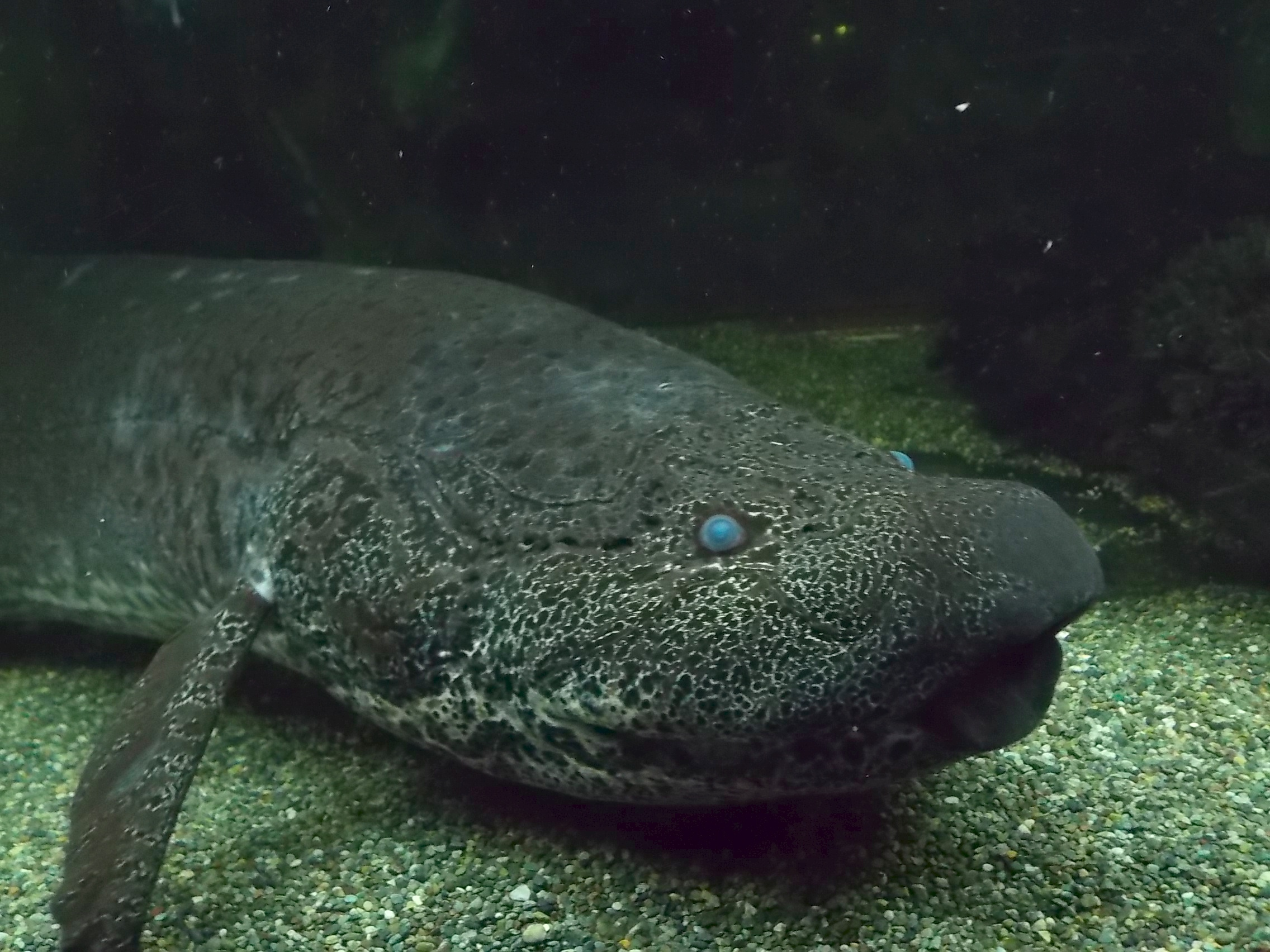
Marbled or leopard African lungfish, Protopterus aethiopicus

The family Protopteridae and genus Protopterus contain four extant (living) species:

- Protopterus aethiopicus Heckel, 1851 — marbled lungfish
  - P. a. aethiopicus Heckel, 1851
  - P. a. congicus Poll, 1961
  - P. a. mesmaekersi Poll, 1961
- Protopterus amphibius (W. K. H. Peters, 1844) — gilled African lungfish or East African lungfish
- Protopterus annectens (Owen, 1839) — West African lungfish
  - P. a. annectens (Owen, 1839)
  - P. a. brieni Poll, 1961 — southern lungfish
- Protopterus dolloi Boulenger, 1900 — slender lungfish or spotted African lungfish

Other extinct species are known from fossil remains:

- †Protopterus crassidens Churcher & de Iuliis 2001
- †Protopterus elongus Martin 1995
- †Protopterus libycus Stromer 1910
- †Protopterus nigeriensis Martin 1997
- †Protopterus polli Dartevelle & Casier 1949
- †Protopterus protopteroides Tabaste 1962
- †Protopterus regulatus Schall 1984
