= Lavocatodidae =

Lavocatodidae Temporal range: Maastrichtian–Eocene

Scientific classification
- Domain: Eukaryota
- Kingdom: Animalia
- Phylum: Chordata
- Clade: Sarcopterygii
- Class: Dipnoi
- Order: Ceratodontiformes
- Family: †Lavocatodidae; Longrich, 2017

Genera
- †Lavocatodus Martin, 1995; †Xenoceratodus Longrich, 2017

Extinct family of lungfish

Lavocatodidae is an extinct family of lungfish containing two genera.
