= Linthia =

Linthia Temporal range: Late Cretaceous-Eocene

Scientific classification
- Kingdom: Animalia
- Phylum: Echinodermata
- Class: Echinoidea
- Order: Spatangoida
- Family: Schizasteridae
- Genus: †Linthia; Desor, 1853

Extinct genus of sea urchins

Linthia is an extinct genus of echinoids that lived from the Late Cretaceous to the Eocene. Its remains have been found in Africa, Asia, Europe, and North America.
