= Trans-Saharan seaway =

The Trans-Saharan seaway was a sea in the present-day Sahara in the Late Cretaceous period to the Early Eocene in present-day Libya, Chad, Niger, and Nigeria. It varied in size, but its largest was about 3000 km^{2} and approximately 50 m deep.
