= 2025 in archosaur paleontology =

New taxa of fossil archosaurs of every kind were described during the year 2025 (or scheduled to), and other studies related to the paleontology of archosaurs were published that year.

== Pseudosuchians ==
=== New pseudosuchian taxa ===
Name	Novelty	Status	Authors	Age	Type locality	Location	Notes	Image
Crocodylus sudani	Sp. nov	Valid	Salih et al.	Late Pleistocene	Atbara River	Sudan	A crocodile, a species of Crocodylus.	Lateral view of the Crocodylus sudani holotype skull, scalebar = 10 cm
Ibirasuchus	Gen. et sp. nov	Valid	Iori et al.	Late Cretaceous	São José do Rio Preto Formation	Brazil	An itasuchid peirosaurian. The type species is I. gelcae.	
Kostensuchus	Gen. et sp. nov	Valid	Novas et al.	Late Cretaceous (Maastrichtian)	Chorrillo Formation	Argentina	A peirosaurid. The type species is K. atrox.	
Kuttysuchus	Gen. et sp. nov	Valid	Haldar, Ray & Bandyopadhyay	Late Triassic	Lower Dharmaram Formation	India	An aetosaur belonging to the tribe Paratypothoracini. The type species is K. minori.	
Olkasuchus	Gen. et sp. nov	Valid	Sotomayor et al.	Late Triassic (Norian)	Los Colorados Formation	Argentina	An aetosaur. The type species is O. walasto.	
Paarthurnax	Gen. et sp. nov		Platt, Adams & Brochu	Early Cretaceous (Aptian–Albian)	Holly Creek Formation	United States (Arkansas)	A neosuchian with anatomical similarities to goniopholidids and paluxysuchids. The type species is P. holliensis.	
Pattisaura	Gen. et sp. nov	Valid	Wu et al.	Late Triassic	Cooper Canyon Formation	United States (Texas)	An early member of Crocodylomorpha. The type species is P. gracilis.	
Piscogavialis laberintoensis	Sp. nov		Zamora-Vega et al.	Miocene	Pisco Formation	Peru	A gavialid.	
Pseudogavialis	Gen. et comb. nov	Valid	Courville et al.	Oligocene–Miocene	Lower Siwalik	Pakistan	A member of Gavialoidea. The type species is "Gharialis" curvirostris Lydekker (1886).	
Sissokosuchus	Gen. et sp. nov		Wilberg et al.	Early Cretaceous	Continental intercalaire	Mali	An itasuchid peirosaurian. The type species is S. maliensis.	
Taihangosuchus	Gen. et sp. nov	Valid	Wu et al.	Middle Triassic	Ermaying Formation	China	A member of the family Gracilisuchidae. The type species is T. wuxiangensis.	
Tainrakuasuchus	Gen. et sp. nov		Müller et al.	Middle Triassic (Ladinian)	Santa Maria Supersequence (Dinodontosaurus Assemblage Zone)	Brazil	A poposauroid. The type species is T. bellator.	
Telkaralura	Gen. et sp. nov	Valid	Von Baczko et al.	Late Triassic (Carnian)	Chañares Formation	Argentina	A member of the family Gracilisuchidae. The type species is T. coniceti.	
Tewkensuchus	Gen. et sp. nov	Valid	Bravo et al.	Early Paleocene	Salamanca Formation	Argentina	A sebecosuchian. The type species is T. salamanquensis	
Thikarisuchus	Gen. et sp. nov		Allen et al.	Late Cretaceous (Cenomanian)	Blackleaf Formation	United States (Montana)	A neosuchian related to Wannchampsus and assigned to the new clade Wannchampsidae. The type species is T. xenodentes.	
Thilastikosuchus	Gen. et sp. nov	Valid	Carvalho et al.	Early Cretaceous	Quiricó Formation	Brazil	A notosuchian. The type species is T. scutorectangularis.	
Wadisuchus	Gen. et sp. nov	Valid	Saber et al.	Late Cretaceous (Campanian)	Quseir Formation	Egypt	A member of the family Dyrosauridae. The type species is W. kassabi.	

=== General pseudosuchian research ===
- A study on quadrate bones of extant and extinct suchians, providing evidence that quadrate orientation and direction of jaw joint reaction forces were tightly coupled throughout the evolutionary history of suchians, is published by Sellers et al. (2025).
- Lecuona et al. (2025) create a three-dimensional biomechanical model of the whole body of Gracilisuchus stipanicicorum, and interpret the studied archosaur as likely quadrupedal and definitely not an obligate biped.
- Fitch, Kammerer & Nesbitt (2025) describe femora of poposauroids similar to Poposaurus gracilis from the Cumnock and Pekin formations (Chatham Group; North Carolina, United States), expanding known geographical range of Late Triassic poposauroids.
- McDavid (2025) and Pêgas, Bandeira & Silva (2025) discuss the validity and authorship of the name Prestosuchus, considering the name Huenesuchus a junior synonym.
- Sues, Ma & Ezcurra (2025) describe a braincase of a member or a relative of the genus Postosuchus from the Carnian Evangeline Member of the Wolfville Formation (Nova Scotia, Canada), and reconstruct its endocast.

=== Aetosaur research ===
- A study on the histology of osteoderms of Stagonolepis olenkae is published by Błaszczeć & Antczak (2025).
- Reyes et al. (2025) study the anatomy of the holotype specimen of Calyptosuchus wellesi, describe new fossil material of members of the species from the Triassic Chinle Formation (Arizona, United States) providing new information on the skull anatomy of the studied aetosaur, study the phylogenetic relationships of the species, and name a new aetosaur clade Calyptosuchini.
- Haldar & Ray (2025) identify osteoderms of a probable desmatosuchine aetosaur from the Upper Triassic Tiki Formation (India).
- Haldar, Ray & Bandyopadhyay (2025) describe distinctive desmatosuchin osteoderms from the Lower Dharmaram Formation, including the first record of cf. Desmatosuchus sp. from India.

=== Crocodylomorph research ===
- A study on the diversity of cranial shapes of crocodylomorphs throughout their evolutionary history is published by Melstrom et al. (2025), who find that crocodylomorphs with generalist dietary ecology were most likely to survive and diversify after mass extinction events.
- A study on bone histology of Trialestes romeri, providing evidence of a rapid growth rate, is published by Ponce, Cerda & Desojo (2025).
- Redescription and a study on the affinities of Pseudhesperosuchus jachaleri is published by Leardi (2025).
- Srinivas et al. (2025) compare biomechanical and functional adaptations of skulls of different shapes in extant and extinct crocodyliforms, providing evidence that terrestrial taxa with dome-shaped skulls, which were not subject to hydrodynamic constraints during their evolution, were better adapted to resisting feeding-induced stresses compared to taxa with broad and flat snouts.
- Wang et al. (2025) describe a new specimen of Platyognathus hsui from the Lower Jurassic Lufeng Formation (China), identify P. hsui as an early-branching relative of gobiosuchids, and name a new superfamily Gobiosuchoidea.
- A study on the biodiversity of thalattosuchians throughout their evolutionary history, attempting to identify factors driving thalattosuchian evolution, is published by Forêt et al. (2025).
- Redescription of Macrospondylus bollensis is published by Johnson et al. (2025).
- Johnson et al. (2025) study the taphonomy of specimens of Macrospondylus bollensis and Platysuchus multiscrobiculatus from the Posidonia Shale (Germany), and identify features indicative of headfirst seafloor landings of teleosauroid specimens.
- Bhuttarach et al. (2025) describe fossil material of the possible largest member of the genus Indosinosuchus from the Phu Kradung Formation (Thailand), as well as fossil material of an indeterminate teleosauroid from the Klong Min Formation representing the first record of a member of this group from southern peninsular Thailand.
- Pellarin et al. (2025) study the femoral histology of Thalattosuchus superciliosus, and interpret the studied crocodylomorph as unlikely to be an endotherm.
- A study on the variation of the flexure of the tail in Callovian and Late Jurassic metriorhynchids is published by Le Mort et al. (2025).
- Albuquerque et al. (2025) describe isolated crocodyliform teeth from the Cretaceous (Albian–Cenomanian) Açu Formation (Brazil), including the first records of members of the group Sphagesauria, Itasuchidae and Candidodontidae from the Potiguar Basin reported to date.
- A study on metabolic rates of notosuchians, providing evidence of mass-independent maximal metabolic rates that were higher than those of extant crocodilians but lower than those of monitor lizards, in published by Sena et al. (2025).
- A study on the morphology, histology and growth of osteoderms of Late Cretaceous notosuchians from the Bauru Group (Brazil) is published by Cajado et al. (2025).
- Muscioni et al. (2025) describe fossil material of Doratodon cf. carcharidens from the Campanian strata from the Villaggio del Pescatore site (Italy), providing new information on the anatomy and tooth replacement pattern of Doratodon, including evidence of presence of an alveolar tissue vascularization and innervation system in the mandible that might have provided enhanced tactile sensitivity.
- The first histological study of appendicular bones of a peirosaurid is published by Navarro et al. (2025), who interpret their findings as indicative of different growth dynamics of the studied individual compared to other notosuchians.
- A study on the bone histology of Pissarrachampsa sera, providing evidence of differential growth rates among skeletal elements, is published by Aureliano et al. (2025).
- Redescription and a study of the phylogenetic affinities of Eremosuchus elkoholicus is published by Nicholl et al. (2025).
- Fossil material of a member or a relative of the genus Sebecus is described from the late Neogene strata of the Yanigua/Los Haitises Formation (Dominican Republic) by Viñola López et al. (2025).
- Martin & Jattiot (2025) describe fossil material of neosuchians (cf. Pholidosauridae and indeterminate Neosuchia) from the Salazac and Carniol sites in southeastern France, representing one of the few records of crocodylomorph fossils from the Aptian–Albian interval found in marine deposits in Europe.
- Fossil material of a small-bodied atoposaurid, possibly representing a previously unrecognized taxon and providing information on the neuroanatomy of atoposaurids, is described from the Upper Jurassic Praia Azul Member of the Lourinhã Formation (Portugal) by Puértolas-Pascual (2025).
- Maréchal et al. (2025) describe fossil material of a hyposaurine dyrosaurid from the Maastrichtian strata from Bentiaba (Angola) and study the diversification rates of dyrosaurids, finding evidence of a hyposaurine diversification during the Maastrichtian.
- Kuzmin et al. (2025) describe the braincase osteology and neuroanatomy of Paralligator, and interpret their findings as indicative of similarity of brain modifications during ontogeny in paralligatorids and extant crocodilians.
- Kubo et al. (2025) study crocodyliform remains from the Turonian Tamagawa Formation (Japan), identify two osteoderms as probable paralligatorid fossil material, and interpret teeth from the studied assemblage as belonging to crocodyliforms that likely fed on mid- to large-sized tetrapods.
- New allodaposuchid fossil material, providing new information on the postcranial anatomy of members of this group, is described from the Upper Cretaceous (Maastrichtian) strata from the Fontllonga-6 locality (Fontllonga Group; Spain) by Della Giustina, Rocchi & Vila (2025).
- De Lapparent de Broin (2025) describes a new specimen of Massaliasuchus affuvelensis from the Campanian strata in the Fuveau lignite Mining Basin (Provence, France).
- A study on the anatomy and affinities of the first specimens of Borealosuchus from earliest Paleocene of Colorado, filling temporal and geographical gaps in the fossil record of members of the genus, is published by Lessner, Petermann & Lyson (2025).
- Walter et al. (2025) study the phylogenetic affinities of Deinosuchus and recover it as a member of the crocodylian stem group.
- Kuzmin, Skutschas & Sues (2025) describe a partial skull including the braincase of cf. Tadzhikosuchus sp. from the Turonian Bissekty Formation (Uzbekistan), interpreted as the stratigraphically oldest alligatoroid specimen reported to date and the first record of a Diplocynodon-like alligatoroid from the Late Cretaceous of Central Asia.
- Evidence from the study of the bone histology of Diplocynodon hantoniensis, interpreted as indicative of a similar growth rate in D. hantoniensis and the American alligator, is published by Hoffman et al. (2025).
- Description of the anatomy of the inner skull cavities of Diplocynodon tormis is published by Serrano-Martínez et al. (2025).
- Fossil material of a small alligatoroid, possibly representing a previously unrecognized taxon, is described from the Eocene Clarno Formation (Oregon, United States) by Stout et al. (2025).
- Evidence from the study of hindlimb biomechanics of extant American alligators and Deinosuchus riograndensis, indicating that adoption of more erect limb postures might have reduced limb bone stresses and facilitated the evolution of larger body sizes in terrestrial tetrapods, is presented by Iijima, Blob & Hutchinson (2025).
- The oldest crocodylian eggshells from Australia reported to date, probably representing parts of eggs produced by mekosuchines from the Tingamarra Local Fauna, are described from the Eocene strata of the Oakdale Sandstone (Queensland) by Panadès I Blas et al. (2025), who name a new ootaxon Wakkaoolithus godthelpi.
- Pligersdorffer, Burke & Mannion (2025) reconstruct the endocranial anatomy of Argochampsa krebsi, and report evidence of presence of salt glands in the studied gavialoid.
- Description of a new specimen of Dolichochampsa minima from the El Molino Formation (Bolivia), providing new information on the anatomy of members of this species, and a study on its phylogenetic affinities is published by Vélez-Rosado et al. (2025).
- Evidence of variability of the skull morphology of extant Nile crocodiles and broad-snouted crocodilians from the Paleogene strata in the Faiyum Governorate and Miocene strata from the Wadi Moghra site (Egypt) is presented by El-Degwi et al. (2025).
- Górka et al. (2025) revise crocodilian records from the early and middle Miocene strata in Czech Republic and Poland, and describe a new osteoderm from the Szczerców field of the Bełchatów mine (Poland) representing the northernmost record of a Neogene crocodilian reported to date.
- Harzhauser et al. (2025) describe an osteoderm of a crocodilian (possibly a member of the genus Diplocynodon) living approximately 12.2 million years ago from the strata of the Vienna Basin (Austria), representing the youngest record of a crocodilian from Central Europe reported to date.
- A study on alterations of crocodyliform fossils from the Adamantina Formation (Brazil) during diagenesis is published by Muniz et al. (2025).
- Hart, Atterholt & Wedel (2025) identify neural canal ridges (bony protrusions on the neural canal anchoring the denticulate ligaments that support the spinal cord) in caudal vertebrae of a member of the genus Thecachampsa from the Miocene Choptank Formation (Maryland, United States) and a member of the genus Deinosuchus from the Cretaceous (Campanian) Menefee Formation (New Mexico, United States), representing the first records of these structures reported in fossil crocodylians.

== Non-avian dinosaurs ==
=== New dinosaur taxa ===
Name	Novelty	Status	Authors	Age	Type locality	Country	Notes	Images
Ahshislesaurus	Gen. et sp. nov	Valid	Dalman et al.	Late Cretaceous (Campanian)	Kirtland Formation	United States (New Mexico)	A saurolophine hadrosaurid belonging to the tribe Kritosaurini. The type species is A. wimani.	
Ahvaytum	Gen. et sp. nov	Valid	Lovelace et al.	Late Triassic (Carnian)	Popo Agie Formation	United States (Wyoming)	An early saurischian, possibly a basal sauropodomorph. The type species is A. bahndooiveche.	
Anteavis	Gen. et sp. nov	Valid	Martínez et al.	Late Triassic (Carnian)	Ischigualasto Formation	Argentina	An early theropod. The type species is A. crurilongus.	
Archaeocursor	Gen. et sp. nov	Valid	Yao et al.	Early Jurassic (Sinemurian–Pliensbachian)	Ziliujing Formation	China	A basal ornithischian. The type species is A. asiaticus. Announced in 2024; the final article version was published in 2025.	
Astigmasaura	Gen. et sp. nov	Valid	Bellardini et al.	Late Cretaceous (Cenomanian)	Huincul Formation	Argentina	A rebbachisaurid sauropod. The type species is A. genuflexa.	
Athenar	Gen. et sp. nov	Valid	Whitlock et al.	Late Jurassic (Tithonian)	Morrison Formation	United States (Utah)	A dicraeosaurid sauropod. The type species is A. bermani.	
Brontotholus	Gen. et sp. nov	Valid	Woodruff et al.	Late Cretaceous (Campanian)	Two Medicine and Oldman formations	United States (Montana); Canada (Alberta)	A pachycephalosaur belonging to the subfamily Pachycephalosaurinae. The type species is B. harmoni.	
Cariocecus	Gen. et sp. nov	Valid	Bertozzo et al.	Early Cretaceous (Barremian)	Papo Seco Formation	Portugal	A hadrosauroid ornithopod. The type species is C. bocagei.	
Chadititan	Gen. et sp. nov	Valid	Agnolín et al.	Late Cretaceous (Campanian)	Anacleto Formation	Argentina	A rinconsaurian titanosaur. The type species is C. calvoi.	
Cienciargentina	Gen. et sp. nov	Valid	Simón & Salgado	Late Cretaceous (Cenomanian-Turonian)	Huincul Formation	Argentina	A rebbachisaurid sauropod. The type species is C. sanchezi.	
Duonychus	Gen. et sp. nov	Valid	Kobayashi et al.	Late Cretaceous (Cenomanian–Coniacian)	Bayanshiree Formation	Mongolia	A therizinosaurid theropod. The type species is D. tsogtbaatari.	
Dzharacursor	Gen. et comb. nov	Valid	Averianov & Sues	Late Cretaceous (Turonian)	Bissekty Formation	Uzbekistan	An ornithomimid theropod. The type species is "Archaeornithomimus" bissektensis Nesov (1995).	
Emiliasaura	Gen. et sp. nov	Valid	Coria et al.	Early Cretaceous (Valanginian)	Mulichinco Formation	Argentina	An ornithopod belonging to the group Rhabdodontomorpha. The type species is E. alessandrii. Announced in 2024; the final article version was published in 2025.	
Enigmacursor	Gen. et sp. nov	Valid	Maidment & Barrett	Late Jurassic (Kimmeridgian–Tithonian)	Morrison Formation	United States (Colorado)	A non-cerapodan neornithischian. The type species is E. mollyborthwickae.	
Huadanosaurus	Gen. et sp. nov	Valid	Qiu et al.	Early Cretaceous (Barremian)	Yixian Formation	China	A compsognathid-like theropod belonging to the group Sinosauropterygidae. The type species is H. sinensis.	
Huashanosaurus	Gen. et sp. nov	Valid	Mo et al.	Early–Middle Jurassic	Wangmen Formation	China	A basal eusauropodan sauropod. The type species is H. qini.	
Huayracursor	Gen. et sp. nov	Valid	Hechenleitner et al.	Late Triassic (Carnian)	Santo Domingo Formation	Argentina	A basal sauropodomorph. The type species is H. jaguensis.	
Istiorachis	Gen. et sp. nov	Valid	Lockwood, Martill, & Maidment	Early Cretaceous (Barremian)	Wessex Formation	United Kingdom	A styracosternan ornithopod. The type species is I. macarthurae.	
Jinchuanloong	Gen. et sp. nov	Valid	Li et al.	Middle Jurassic (Bathonian)	Xinhe Formation	China	A basal eusauropodan sauropod. The type species is J. niedu.	
Joaquinraptor	Gen. et sp. nov	Valid	Ibiricu et al.	Late Cretaceous (Maastrichtian)	Lago Colhué Huapí Formation	Argentina	A megaraptorid theropod. The type species is J. casali.	
Khankhuuluu	Gen. et sp. nov	Valid	Voris et al.	Late Cretaceous (Turonian–Santonian)	Bayanshiree Formation	Mongolia	A tyrannosauroid theropod. The type species is K. mongoliensis.	
Maleriraptor	Gen. et sp. nov	Valid	Ezcurra et al.	Late Triassic (Norian)	Upper Maleri Formation	India	A herrerasaurian saurischian. The type species is M. kuttyi.	
Mamenchisaurus sanjiangensis	Sp. nov	Valid	Dai et al.	Late Jurassic (?early Oxfordian)	Shaximiao Formation	China	A mamenchisaurid sauropod; a species of Mamenchisaurus.	
Manipulonyx	Gen. et sp. nov	Valid	Averianov, Lopatin & Atuchin	Late Cretaceous (Maastrichtian)	Nemegt Formation	Mongolia	A parvicursorine alvarezsaurid theropod. The type species is M. reshetovi.	
Mexidracon	Gen. et sp. nov	Valid	Serrano-Brañas et al.	Late Cretaceous (Campanian)	Cerro del Pueblo Formation	Mexico	An ornithomimid theropod. The type species is M. longimanus.	
Nanotyrannus lethaeus	Sp. nov	Valid	Zanno & Napoli	Late Cretaceous (Maastrichtian)	Hell Creek Formation	United States (Montana)	A tyrannosauroid theropod; a species of Nanotyrannus.	
Newtonsaurus	Gen. et comb. nov	Valid	Evans et al.	Late Triassic (Rhaetian)	Lilstock Formation	United Kingdom	A basal theropod. The type species is "Zanclodon" cambrensis (Newton, 1899).	
Obelignathus	Gen. et comb. nov	Valid	Czepiński & Madzia	Late Cretaceous (Campanian-Maastrichtian)	Argiles et Grès à Reptiles Formation	France	An ornithopod belonging to the group Rhabdodontomorpha. The type species is "Rhabdodon" septimanicus Buffetaut & Le Loeuff (1991).	
Paulodon	Gen. et comb. nov		Sancarlo, Mandorlo & Ford	Early Cretaceous (Barremian)	Camarillas Formation	Spain	A styracosternan ornithopod. The type species is "Iguanodon" galvensis Verdú et al. (2015).	
Petrustitan	Gen. et comb. nov	Valid	Díez Díaz et al.	Late Cretaceous (Maastrichtian)	Sînpetru Formation	Romania	A titanosaur sauropod. The type species is "Magyarosaurus" hungaricus Huene (1932).	
Pulaosaurus	Gen. et sp. nov	Valid	Yang, King & Xu	Jurassic (Callovian-Oxfordian)	Tiaojishan Formation	China	An early-diverging neornithischian. The type species is P. qinglong.	
Qianjiangsaurus	Gen. et sp. nov	Valid	Dai et al.	Late Cretaceous	Zhengyang Formation	China	An early-diverging hadrosauromorph. The type species is Q. changshengi. Announced in 2024; the final article version was published in 2025.	
Shri rapax	Sp. nov	Valid	Moutrille et al.	Late Cretaceous	Djadochta Formation	Mongolia	A dromaeosaurid theropod; a species of Shri.	
Sinosauropteryx lingyuanensis	Sp. nov	Valid	Qiu et al.	Early Cretaceous (Barremian)	Yixian Formation	China	A compsognathid-like theropod; a species of Sinosauropteryx.	
Taleta	Gen. et sp. nov	Valid	Longrich et al.	Late Cretaceous (Maastrichtian)	Ouled Abdoun Basin	Morocco	A lambeosaurine hadrosaurid belonging to the tribe Arenysaurini. The type species is T. taleta.	
Tameryraptor	Gen. et sp. nov	Valid	Kellermann, Cuesta & Rauhut	Late Cretaceous (Cenomanian)	Bahariya Formation	Egypt	A carcharodontosaurid theropod. The type species is T. markgrafi.	
Tongnanlong	Gen. et sp. nov	Valid	Wei et al.	Late Jurassic	Suining Formation	China	A mamenchisaurid sauropod. The type species is T. zhimingi.	
Uriash	Gen. et sp. nov	Valid	Díez Díaz et al.	Late Cretaceous (Maastrichtian)	Densuș-Ciula Formation	Romania	A titanosaur sauropod. The type species is U. kadici.	
Utetitan	Gen. et sp. nov	Valid	Paul	Late Cretaceous (Maastrichtian)	North Horn, Black Peaks, and possibly Javelina formations	United States (Utah, Texas)	A titanosaur sauropod. The type species is U. zellaguymondeweyae.	
Vitosaura	Gen. et sp. nov	Valid	Jiménez Velandia et al.	Late Cretaceous (possibly Campanian)	Los Llanos Formation	Argentina	An abelisaurid theropod. The type species is V. colozacani.	
Wudingloong	Gen. et sp. nov	Valid	Wang et al.	Early Jurassic (Hettangian to Sinemurian)	Yubacun Formation	China	A massopodan sauropodomorph. The type species is W. wui.	
Xingxiulong yueorum	Sp. nov	Valid	Chen et al.	Early Jurassic	Lufeng Formation	China	A massopodan sauropodomorph; a species of Xingxiulong.	
Yuanmouraptor	Gen. et sp. nov	Valid	Zou et al.	Middle Jurassic	Zhanghe Formation	China	A metriacanthosaurid theropod. The type species is Y. jinshajiangensis.	
Yuanyanglong	Gen. et sp. nov	Valid	Hao et al.	Early Cretaceous	Miaogou Formation	China	An oviraptorosaurian theropod. The type species is Y. bainian. Announced in 2024; the final article version was published in 2025.	
Zavacephale	Gen. et sp. nov	Valid	Chinzorig et al.	Early Cretaceous (Aptian–Albian)	Khuren Dukh Formation	Mongolia	A basal pachycephalosaur. The type species is Z. rinpoche.	
Zhongyuansaurus junchangi	Sp. nov	Valid	Zhang et al.	Early Cretaceous	Haoling Formation	China	An ankylosaurid; a species of Zhongyuansaurus.	

=== General non-avian dinosaur research ===
- Maidment and Butler (2025) review the state of dinosaur taxonomy and attempt to determine the geographical areas and time periods likely to offer the best opportunities for major new discoveries.
- Heath et al. (2025) use historical biogeographic estimation methods to estimate the distribution of early dinosaurs and their relatives, and consider low-latitude Gondwana to be the most likely area of origin of dinosaurs, and possibly of archosaurs in general.
- Sen, Bagchi & Ray (2025) study the biogeography of Late Triassic dinosaurs, and interpret the fossil record as consistent with South American origin of dinosaurs followed by simultaneous dispersals into Laurasia and east Gondwana. This was reassessed by Müller et al. (2025), who recognize that methodological issues in the original analysis—particularly inadequate search parameters, matrix design, and outgroup sampling—render its conclusions about dinosaur origins unreliable.
- Dempsey et al. (2025) review the utility of methods used to estimate body mass of extinct tetrapods, and present new estimates of body segment mass properties of 52 non-avian dinosaurs.
- Evidence from the study of extant tetrapods and non-avian dinosaurs, indicative of a link between mass distribution and robusticity of the humeral shaft relative to the femoral shaft which can be used to determine mass distribution in fossil tetrapods, is presented by Dempsey et al. (2025).
- Aureliano et al. (2025) compare the microstructure of appendicular bones in non-avian dinosaurs and large-bodied mammals, and interpret it as indicating that gigantism was achieved through divergent evolutionary pathways in the two groups.
- Jensen et al. (2025) comment on the studies on brain neuron counts of dinosaurs and their possible cognition published by Herculano-Houzel (2023) and Caspar et al. (2024), support the existence of a link between telencephalic neuron counts and cognitive performance, consider the estimates of neuron counts from both studies to be uncertain, and argue that shift towards endothermy in dinosaurs and related increase of their energetic needs might have been linked to cognitive evolution, referring to the endothermic brain hypothesis formulated by Osvath et al. (2024); in response Caspar et al. (2025) reaffirm the conclusions of their 2024 study, argue that the fossil record does not confirm coevolution of endothermy with enlarged brains or elevated neuron densities, and argue that high neuron number estimates for Mesozoic dinosaurs might have explanasions that are unrelated to their cognitive abilities.
- Review of sources of information about dinosaur locomotion, and of studies of dinosaur locomotion from the preceding years, is published by Falkingham (2025).
- Prescott et al. (2025) reevaluate the accuracy of equations used to calculate speed of dinosaurs from fossil trackways, and find that none of the equations accurately predicted speed of extant helmeted guinea fowl from tracks made in mud.
- Baumgart et al. (2025) review the utility of methods used in the studies of dinosaur thermoregulation and respiratory, cardiovascular and digestive systems.
- Review of studies of dinosaur reproduction and ontogeny, and of challenges in the studies of dinosaur reproductive biology, is published by Chapelle, Griffin & Pol (2025).
- Holtz (2025) argues that, because of ontogenetic niche shifts during the life of non-avian dinosaurs, the functional richness of their communities might have exceeded functional richness of Cenozoic mammalian communities.
- Schweitzer et al. (2025) study the composition of vascular-like microstructures isolated from dinosaur fossils from the Judith River and Hell Creek formations, and interpret their findings as supporting endogeneity of the studied structures, but also report the presence of microorganismal components in the studied samples.
- Evidence of preservation of heme bound to a protein moiety in tissues of specimens of Brachylophosaurus canadensis and Tyrannosaurus rex is presented by Long et al. (2025).
- Evidence of the presence of a strong connective tissue in the cheek region of dinosaur skulls, linking the zygoma and mandible in dinosaurs, is presented by Sharpe et al. (2025).
- Lautenschlager et al. (2025) present evidence indicating that dinosaur skulls evolved towards morphologies that were a compromise of different functions rather than towards functionally optimal proportions, as well as evidence indicating that rostrum was the part of dinosaur skull showing the greatest variability and plasticity.
- Tucker et al. (2025) determine the ages of dinosaurs eggs from the Cretaceous strata of the Mussentuchit Member of the Cedar Mountain Formation (Utah, United States) and from the Teel Ulaan Chaltsai locality in the Eastern Gobi Basin (Mongolia) on the basis of U-Pb calcite dating and elemental mapping of eggshells, and interpret their findings as indicative of utility of eggshell biocalcite from eggs of dinosaurs and other egg-laying vertebrates as a geochronometer in Mesozoic and Cenozoic terrestrial sedimentary basins.
- Zhang et al. (2025) interpret secondary eggshell units in eggs of non-avian dinosaurs as biogenic in nature, as interpret their rarity in eggs of maniraptoran theropods as suggestive of a change of the biomineralization mechanism of dinosaur eggshells near the origin of Maniraptora.
- Review of the fossil record of Triassic-Jurassic dinosaurs and other reptiles from the Connecticut Valley (Connecticut and Massachusetts, United States) is published by Galton, Regalado Fernández & Farlow (2025), who consider Ammosaurus major to be a separate taxon from Anchisaurus polyzelus.
- McDonald et al. (2025) study the stratigraphy of the Triassic-Jurassic strata of the Hartford and Deerfield basins (Connecticut and Massachusetts) preserving dinosaur tracks, reconstruct the environment in which the tracks were produced (providing evidence of presence of large theropod tracks in lake-margin strata and evidence of presence of large herbivorous dinosaur tracks in areas closer to upland environments), and interpret theropod trackmakers as spending most of their days at lake margins feeding on fishes and smaller tetrapods, while larger herbivores might have lived in upland habitats.
- Niedźwiedzki et al. (2025) report the discovery of a new, diverse assemblage of theropod and early ornithischian tracks from the Upper Triassic (Norian-Rhaetian transition) strata from the Lisowice-Lipie Śląskie site (Poland), including the biggest theropod tracks from the Upper Triassic of the Central European Basin reported to date.
- Xing et al. (2025) describe new dinosaur tracksites from the Lower Jurassic Ziliujing Formation (China), including didactyl footprints interpreted as most likely produced by non-didactyl trackmakers while punting or running.
- Milàn & Vallon (2025) study dinosaur tracks from the Middle Jurassic Bagå Formation (Denmark), interpreted as evidence of presence of a diverse dinosaur fauna unknown from skeletal remains.
- New tracksites including sauropod tracks and dominated by ornithischian tracks are described from the Middle Jurassic Dansirit Formation (Shemshak Group, Iran) by Xing, Abbassi & Chen (2025).
- Deiques et al. (2025) report the discovery of new dinosaur tracks from the Upper Jurassic Guará Formation (Brazil), including second record of an ankylosaur track and the best preserved theropod track from the formation reported to date.
- Evidence from the study of stable calcium isotope data from tooth enamel of dinosaurs from the Carnegie Quarry at Dinosaur National Monument (Morrison Formation; Utah, United States), interpreted as indicating that Allosaurus did not consume significant amounts of bone, as well as indicative of niche partitioning between Camarasaurus and Camptosaurus, is presented by Norris et al. (2025).
- Leonardi (2025) reviews known record of body and trace fossils of non-avian dinosaurs from the Cretaceous strata in Brazil.
- Duque et al. (2025) describe the dorsal rib of an indeterminate theropod and two new footprints from the Lower Cretaceous Antenor Navarro Formation (Triunfo Basin, Brazil).
- Mao et al. (2025) describe a new nest with dinosaur eggs from the Lower Cretaceous Xintan Formation (Anhui, China), and name a new faveoloolithid oospecies Parafaveoloolithus wannanensis.
- He et al. (2025) describe a new clutch of dinosaur eggs from the Upper Cretaceous Zhaoying Formation (Henan, China), name a new oospecies Parafaveoloolithus xixiaensis, and transfer the oospecies "Dendroolithus" guoqingsiensis to the oogenus Propagoolithus and "Duovallumoolithus" shangdanensis to the oogenus Parafaveoloolithus.
- Romilio et al. (2025) reconstruct an ornithopod trackway from the Lower Cretaceous strata from the Browns Creek tracksite (Eumeralla Formation; Victoria, Australia), and report the discovery of new theropod tracks from the same track horizon.
- A new assemblage of dinosaur tracks, including sauropod tracks and possible tracks of bipedal dinosaurs, is described from the Lower Cretaceous (Albian) strata of the Madongshan Formation from the Yaoshan site (China) by Yang et al. (2025).
- Carrano (2025) identifies the first tyrannosauroid and neoceratopsian fossil material from the Lower Cretaceous Newark Canyon Formation (Nevada, United States).
- Xing et al. (2025) describe new dinosaurs tracks from the Cretaceous (Albian to Coniacian) strata of the Shaxian Formation at the Longxiang site (Fujian, China) and review known record of dinosaur tracks from this site, confirming that the studied track assemblage is dominated by tracks produced by ankylopollexian ornithopods, but also includes theropod (including probable large-bodied deinonychosaur) and sauropod tracks.
- Chen et al. (2025) determine the age of dendroolithid eggs from the Coniacian-Santonian strata from the Tumiaoling Dinosaur Egg Fossil Locality in Qinglongshan (Hubei, China) on the basis of U-Pb dating of calcite samples identified within the eggs.
- New assemblage of dinosaur footprints, including ceratopsid, tyrannosaurid, probable ankylosaurian and small theropod-like footprints, is described from the Campanian Dinosaur Park Formation (Alberta, Canada) by Bell et al. (2025).
- Yu et al. (2025) report the discovery of new tyrannosaurid, dromaeosaurid (dromaeosaurine and velociraptorine), titanosaur and hadrosauroid teeth from the Upper Cretaceous Nenjiang Formation, providing new information on the diversity of Late Cretaceous dinosaurs from the Songliao Basin (China).
- A study on habitat preferences of Campanian and Maastrichtian dinosaurs from south-western Europe is published by Vázquez López et al. (2025).
- Van Der Linden et al. (2025) provide the first description of a fragment of a dinosaur eggshell from the Maastrichtian Lance Formation (Wyoming, United States), assigned to the oofamily Ovaloolithidae and produced either by a theropod or by an ornithopod.
- A study on the structure of the latest Cretaceous dinosaur fossil record from North America is published by Dean et al. (2025), who argue that research on diversity dynamics of dinosaurs before the Cretaceous–Paleogene extinction event is hampered by geological sampling biases.
- Flynn et al. (2025) determine the strata of the Naashoibito Member of the Kirtland/Ojo Alamo Formation (New Mexico, United States) preserving non-avian dinosaur fossils to be latest Maastrichtian in age, and interpret this finding as indicative of high diversity of North American dinosaurs living before the Cretaceous–Paleogene extinction event, as well as indicating that Maastrichtian dinosaur faunas from Laramidia were not uniform in the entire continent.
- Weaver et al. (2025) link the widespread facies shifts in western North America during the Cretaceous–Paleogene transition to the Cretaceous–Paleogene extinction event, arguing that non-avian dinosaurs likely promoted open habitats and that their extinction might have resulted in widespread emergence of dense forest cover.

=== Saurischian research ===
- Garcia, Martínez & Müller (2025) identify pathological marks on the skull bones of herrerasaurid specimens representing the oldest record of pathologies in dinosaurs reported to date, and interpret those lesions as likely resulting from agonistic behaviour of the studied dinosaurs.
- Theropod and sauropod trace fossils, including possible drag marks and evidence of trampling, are described from the Lower Jurassic Kota Formation (India) by Rozario & Dasgupta (2025).
- New assemblage of theropod and sauropod tracks produced in a lagoonal margin environment is described from the Middle Jurassic Kilmaluag Formation (United Kingdom) by Blakesley et al. (2025).
- Gesualdi et al. (2025) describe sauropod and theropod tracks from the Upper Jurassic – Lower Cretaceous Chacarilla Formation (Chile), providing evidence of presence of small, medium and large-bodied theropod in the subtropical arid environments of Gondwana during the Jurassic-Cretaceous transition.
- A study on the purported swimming sauropod trail from the Mayan Dude Ranch tracksite in the Lower Cretaceous Glen Rose Formation (Texas, United States), as well as on the second manus-dominated sauropod trackway and on the theropod track from the same track horizon, is published by Adams et al. (2025), who interpret the studied tracks as unlikely to be produced by dinosaurs that buoyed in deep water.
- A tooth of a theropod distinct from Sinotyrannus, as well as a titanosauriform tooth representing the youngest sauropod fossil from the Jehol Biota reported to date, are described from the Lower Cretaceous Jiufotang Formation (China) by Yin et al. (2025).
- Olmedo-Romaña et al. (2025) describe fossil material of dinosaurs from the Campanian-Maastrichtian strata of the Fundo El Triunfo Formation (Peru), including postcranial remains of titanosaur sauropods and theropod teeth which might represent the youngest record of spinosaurids reported to date and the first record of the group from western South America; their conclusions are disputed by Barker, Naish and Gostling (2025), who argue that these teeth lack key features of spinosaurid dentition, and that they most likely represent crocodylomorph teeth.
- Marković et al. (2025) report the discovery of theropod and sauropod fossil material from the Maastrichtian strata from the Osmakovo fossil site, representing the first body fossils of non-avian dinosaurs reported from Serbia.

==== Theropod research ====
- A study on the shape and growth of snouts and beaks of extinct theropods and extant birds, providing evidence of a conserved growth pattern of the rostrum throughout the evolutionary history of theropods, is published by Garland et al. (2025).
- Marques et al. (2025) compare the performance of different machine learning models used for identification of isolated theropod teeth.
- Theropod tracks assigned to three co-occurring ichnotaxa are described from the Lower Jurassic strata of the Peyre site (Causses Basin, France) by Moreau, Sciau & Jean (2025).
- Xing et al. (2025) describe new theropod trace fossils from the Lower Jurassic strata from the Wuli site (Ziliujing Formation; Sichuan, China), including probable tail drag impressions interpreted as possible evidence of vigilant or aggressive behavior of the tracemakers.
- Tracks produced by both large and multiple smaller-bodied theropods are described from the Middle Jurassic strata of the Valtos Sandstone and Kilmaluag formations (Scotland, United Kingdom) by Blakesley et al. (2025).
- Yurac et al. (2025) identify theropod tracks representing at least five different morphotypes in the strata of the Oxfordian Majala Formation in the Quebrada Huatacondo area (Chile).
- Piñuela et al. (2025) report the discovery of a theropod footprint preserved with a detached sandstone undertrack from the Upper Jurassic Lastres Formation (Spain), providing evidence of foot movement through the sediment and evidence of changes of footprint morphology at different levels of sediment depth, with some of the successive footprint outlines showing similarities to footprints of members of different dinosaur groups; the authors also reevaluate the type series of the ichnotaxon Iguanodontipus, and argue that some of the studied footprints might have been produced by a theropod.
- A study on the taxonomic composition of the assemblage of isolated theropod teeth from the Upper Jurassic strata from the Andrés fossil site (Portugal) is published by Malafaia et al. (2025).
- Evidence of distinct wear surfaces in isolated theropod teeth from the Andrés fossil site is presented by Batista et al. (2025).
- Reolid & Cardenal (2025) describe theropod tracks from the Berriasian strata of the Internal Prebetic of Sierra del Pozo (Jaén, Spain), representing the first dinosaur tracks from the South-Iberian Palaeomargin reported to date.
- Figueiredo (2025) describes new theropod tracks from the Lower Cretaceous (Barremian) Papo Seco Formation (Portugal), representing morphotypes different from tracks from the underlying layers of the Areia do Mastro Formation.
- Li et al. (2025) calculate speed of the mid-sized theropod that was the producer of a trackway of eubrontid footprints from the Jingchuan Formation (China), interpreted as the fastest-running Cretaceous theropod documented to date.
- Xing et al. (2025) describe a new assemblage of theropod tracks from the Lower Cretaceous Hekou Group (Gansu, China), reporting morphological variation of the studied tracks within a small area interpreted as resulting from varied track preservation.
- Buntin et al. (2025) report the discovery of new mating display scrapes of theropods from the Cenomanian strata of the Dakota Sandstone at Dinosaur Ridge (Colorado, United States), and interpret the site preserving the studied traces as likely to be a lek site.
- Evidence from the study of theropod tracks from the Maastrichtian strata from the Torotoro National Park (Bolivia), indicating that the formation of tail traces associated with the studied trackways was related to walking kinematics of theropods in soft substrate, is presented by McLarty et al. (2025).
- Esperante et al. (2025) study theropod trace fossils from the Carreras Pampa tracksite from the Torotoro National Park, identifying 11 morphotypes for walking tracks and 3 morphotypes for swim tracks, and determine walking and swimming behaviors of the trackmakers.
- Indeterminate theropod phalanges with similarities to phalanges of digging mammals are described from the Turonian Bissekty Formation (Uzbekistan) by Averianov (2025).
- Ősi, Kolláti & Nagy (2025) report evidence of greater diversity of teeth of Late Cretaceous theropods from Central Europe than recognized in earlier studies, and interpret the studied teeth of large tetanurans as indicative of feeding patterns similar to those of the Komodo dragon.
- A new theropod specimen, likely distinct from Sinosaurus triassicus and Shuangbaisaurus anlongbaoensis and related to averostrans, is described from the Lower Jurassic Lufeng Formation (China) by Li et al. (2025).
- Cau & Paterna (2025) describe new theropod fossil material from the Kem Kem Group (Morocco) and revise Bahariasaurus and Deltadromeus, interpreting the former taxon as an abelisauroid showing convergences with the ornithomimosaurs and a senior synonym of the latter taxon; the authors also confirm that the fossil material originally attributed to Kryptops palaios includes both abelisaurid and allosauroid remains, and argue that the fossil material originally attributed to Eocarcharia dinops includes both spinosaurid and allosauroid remains.
- Rocha et al. (2025) describe an isolated abelisauroid teeth from the Cenomanian Açu Formation (Brazil), including a probable noasaurid tooth representing the first record of the group from the Potiguar Basin.
- Evidence from the study of a new dentary of Berthasaura leopoldinae, indicating that this theropod lost its teeth during its ontogeny, is presented by Pierossi et al. (2025).
- A study on bone histology of Ceratosaurus, providing evidence of faster growth rate than in Late Cretaceous members of Ceratosauria, is published by Sombathy, O'Connor & D'Emic (2025).
- A study on the body size evolution in Ceratosauria, providing evidence of a trend towards decreased body size in noasaurids and of constraints on the increase of body size in abelisaurids, is published by Seculi Pereyra, Pérez & Méndez (2025).
- Souza et al. (2025) study the bone histology of Berthasaura leopoldinae, reporting evidence of a significant intra-skeletal variation, and interpret the holotype specimen as a subadult individual.
- Ribeiro et al. (2025) study the affinities of isolated theropod teeth from the Cretaceous Açu Formation (Brazil), reporting the first noasaurid record for the studied formation and identifying four morphotypes of abelisaurid teeth, interpreted as possible evidence of predominance of abelisaurids in the theropod assemblage found in the studied formation.
- A study on the maxillary shape of abelisaurids and its relation to feeding ecology is published by Seculi Pereyra et al. (2025), who find evidence of morphological similarities between the maxillae of Spectrovenator and Late Cretaceous abelisaurids, interpreted as likely to be specialist hunters holding and killing prey with their jaws.
- A study on the evolution of the abelisaurid skull morphology is published by Pereyra et al. (2025).
- Seculi Pereyra (2025) studies the evolution of abelisaurid orbit shape, interpreted as more likely influenced by selective pressures such as those related to specialized predation than by phylogenetic constraints.
- Hendrickx et al. (2025) revise the fossil record of isolated abelisaurid teeth from the Jurassic and Cretaceous strata from Gondwana, identify abelisaurid teeth in the Bathonian Sakaraha Formation (Madagascar) and in the Upper Jurassic Tacuarembó Formation (Uruguay), and study the evolution of abelisaurid tooth morphology.
- A study on the microstructure of teeth and periodontium of an abelisaurid specimen from the Candeleros Formation (Argentina), providing evidence of patterns of tooth formation and replacement in abelisaurids that were comparable with those of other amniotes, is published by Cerda & Porfiri (2025).
- An abelisaurid humerus with the morphology intermediate between those of noasaurids and those of Campanian-Maastrichtian abelisaurids is described from the Santonian Bajo de la Carpa Formation (Argentina) by Méndez et al. (2025).
- Paulina-Carabajal et al. (2025) describe abelisaurid remains representing the first theropod fossils from the Upper Cretaceous Angostura Colorada and Coli Toro formations (Argentina).
- Isasmendi & Malafaia (2025) attribute isolated theropod teeth from the late Campanian Chera 2 (Valencia), early Maastrichtian Montrebei (Lleida) and Campanian–Maastrichtian Viso (Beira Litoral) localities in the Iberian Peninsula to abelisaurids, interpret the theropod tooth from the Cenomanian La Manjoya Formation with possible affinities to Carcharodontosauridae reported by Ruiz Omeñaca et al. (2009) as more likely to be an abelisaurid tooth, and interpret the fossil record as indicating that carcharodontosaurians were likely extinct in Ibero-Armorica by the Cenomanian, with abelisaurids taking over as apex predators in those ecosystems.
- Buffetaut (2025) revises the type material of Genusaurus sisteronis and identifies anatomical traits suggestive of affinities with furileusaurian abelisaurids.
- Zurriaguz & Cerroni (2025) study the pneumaticity of bones of the postcranial skeleton of Tralkasaurus cuyi, Skorpiovenator bustingorryi and Carnotaurus sastrei, providing unambiguous evidence of pneumaticity of dorsal vertebrae of T. cuyi, caudal vertebrae of S. bustingorryi and cervical and dorsal ribs of C. sastrei.
- Redescription of the anatomy of the appendicular skeleton of Piatnitzkysaurus floresi and a study on the phylogenetic affinities of this species is published by Pradelli, Pol & Ezcurra (2025).
- Theropod teeth identified as belonging to members of the groups Spinosauridae, Metriacanthosauridae, Allosauria and Tyrannosauroidea are described from the Upper Jurassic to Lower Cretaceous Khorat Group (Thailand) by Chowchuvech et al. (2025), who interpret the studied teeth as suggestive of a theropod faunal turnover during the Early Cretaceous.
- Isasmendi et al. (2025) describe new fossil material of early-branching tetanurans and baryonychine spinosaurids from the Lower Cretaceous Golmayo Formation (Spain), including a large-bodied baryonychine from the Zorralbo I locality.
- Puntanon & Samathi (2025) review the Cretaceous fossil record of spinosaurids from Asia.
- Puntanon, Suteethorn & Samathi (2025) describe spinosaurid teeth from Hin Lat Yao locality (Sao Khua Formation, Thailand), tentatively identified as belonging to a taxon distinct from Siamosaurus.
- Rauhut, Canudo & Castanera (2025) revise the fossil material originally attributed to Camarillasaurus cirugedae and new fossil material from its type locality, interpret C. cirugedae as a spinosaurine spinosaurid, recover Iberospinus and Vallibonavenatrix as members of Spinosaurinae, and consider Protathlitis cinctorrensis to be a probably chimeric nomen dubium of uncertain affinities.
- Evidence indicating that oxygen isotope composition in tooth dentine of Spinosaurus aegyptiacus can be used as a proxy for environmental reconstructions is presented by Liu et al. (2025), who record oxygen isotope variability in the dentine of the studied theropod, interpreted as likely reflecting seasonal environmental changes.
- Description of new fossil material of Allosaurus from the Andrés fossil site (Portugal) and a taxonomic revision of this genus is published by Malafaia et al. (2025), who interpret A. fragilis and A. jimmadseni as the only valid species of Allosaurus from the Late Jurassic of North America, and consider the holotype of Allosaurus europaeus to be a specimen of A. fragilis.
- Kotevski et al. (2025) describe new fossil material of theropods from the Lower Cretaceous Strzelecki Group and Eumeralla Formation (Australia), including the first carcharodontosaurian fossils from Australia, bones of large-bodied megaraptorids and a tibia of a member of Unenlagiinae.
- Oswald et al. (2025) revise purported teeth of Acrocanthosaurus from the Sonorasaurus Quarry in the Turney Ranch Formation of Arizona and the Long Walk Quarry in the Ruby Ranch Member of the Cedar Mountain Formation (Utah), describe additional allosauroid teeth from three localities in the Yellow Cat Member of the Cedar Mountain Formation, and interpret the studied fossils as possible evidence of presence of fossil material of up to four carcharodontosaurid taxa in the Cedar Mountain Formation.
- Averianov et al. (2025) describe a maxilla of a member of the genus Ulughbegsaurus from the Cenomanian Khodzhakul Formation (Uzbekistan), and interpret its morphology as supporting the attribution of Ulughbegsaurus to the family Carcharodontosauridae.
- A tooth of a carcharodontosaurid related to Giganotosaurus and Mapusaurus is described from the Lower Cretaceous strata of the Itapecuru Formation (Brazil) by França et al. (2025).
- Calvo et al. (2025) report the first discovery of the humerus of an adult specimen of Megaraptor namunhuaiquii from the Upper Cretaceous Portezuelo Formation (Argentina), and interpret its anatomy as indicating that M. namunhuaiquii and Gualicho shinyae were not closely related.
- Redescription of the anatomy of the braincase of Megaraptor namunhuaiquii is published by Paulina-Carabajal & Porfiri (2025).
- A study on the biogeography of Megaraptora and Tyrannosauroidea is published by Morrison et al. (2025), who argue that megaraptorans had a cosmopolitan distribution before the splitting of Laurasia and Gondwana, that gigantism evolved multiple times in tyrannosauroids and its evolution might have been related to cooling climate, and that direct ancestors of Tyrannosaurus likely migrated into North America from Asia.
- A study on the evolution of adaptations to cursoriality in the hindlimbs of theropod dinosaurs and on the origin of arctometatarsus in members of Coelurosauria is published by Kubo & Kobayashi (2025)
- Romilio & Xing (2025) study a nearly 70-metres-long theropod trackway (possibly produced by Yutyrannus) from the Cretaceous Jiaguan Formation (China), and present a reconstruction of the locomotion of the trackmaker.
- Evidence from the study of ceratobranchial (hyoid) histology of the holotype specimen of Nanotyrannus lancensis, indicating that the studied individual was nearing or had reached skeletal maturity, is presented by Griffin et al. (2025), who interpret their findings as supporting the classification of N. lancensis as a taxon distinct from Tyrannosaurus rex.
- Voris et al. (2025) study changes of the endocranial morphology of Gorgosaurus libratus during its ontogeny, and report that endocasts of juvenile Gorgosaurus show better defined details of the brain morphology compared to mature specimens.
- Scherer (2025) reeavulates evidence for anagenesis in tyrannosaurine tyrannosaurids, and recovers species belonging to the genus Daspletosaurus as forming an evolutionary grade within Tyrannosaurinae, but does not recover Daspletosaurus as a direct ancestor of Tyrannosaurini.
- Warner-Cowgill et al. (2025) describe a new specimen of Daspletosaurus from the Judith River Formation (Montana, United States), report evidence of the presence of a combination of anatomical features unknown in other members of the genus, and interpret the anatomy of the specimen as weakening the case that D. wilsoni and D. torosus are distinct species.
- Coppock et al. (2025) identify the Daspletosaurus specimen CMN 350 from the Dinosaur Park Formation as the first specimen of Daspletosaurus horneri from Alberta (Canada), and study variability of skull characteristics in members of this species.
- Yun, Delcourt & Currie (2025) study growth trajectories of skull bones of Tarbosaurus bataar, reporting evidence of ontogenetic changes similar to those seen in other tyrannosaurids, as well evidence of presence of variation that wasn't correlated with the size.
- Mitchell et al. (2025) analyze vessel-like structures within the fractured rib of the RSKM P2523.8 specimen of Tyrannosaurus rex, interpreted as angiogenic blood vessel casts, and interpret their preservation as aided by incomplete healing of the rib fracture.
- Paul (2025) revises tyrannosaurid fossil material from the Maastrichtian formations of the North American upper plains, and argues that multiple tyrannosaurid species were present in North America during the Latest Cretaceous.
- Carr (2025) studies the impact of the commercial trade on the sample size of specimens of Tyrannosaurus rex, finds that the rate of discoveries of fossils of T. rex made by commercial companies is higher than that of public trusts, but also reports that commercially collected T. rex fossils mostly remain in private collections or stockrooms, and that there are more fossils of T. rex in private hands than in public trusts.
- Carr (2025) restudies the holotype skull of Tyrannosaurus rex.
- Rowe & Rayfield (2025) compare cranial biomechanics of members of different groups of large-bodied theropods, find evidence of elevated cranial stress in tyrannosaurids related to increased head muscle volume and bite forces, unlike other theropods that experienced lower cranial stress, and interpret these differences as likely related to different feeding strategies of tyrannosaurids and other large theropods.
- Qiu, Wang & Jiang (2025) review the history of discovery, morphology, affinities and ecology of Sinosauropteryx and related theropods.
- Delcourt et al. (2025) revise the anatomy and affinities of Mirischia asymmetrica and Santanaraptor placidus, and interpret the two taxa as unlikely to be synonymous.
- Theda et al. (2025) describe a manual ungual and a metatarsal of an indeterminate ornithomimosaur from the Lower Cretaceous (Barremian to Aptian) strata in Balve (northwestern Germany).
- Isolated dentaries with similarities to bones of deinocheirids are described from the Upper Cretaceous Judith River Formation (Montana, United States) by Chinzorig et al. (2025).
- Meso et al. (2025) revise alvarezsaurid fossils from the Salitral Ojo de Agua locality (Allen Formation; Río Negro Province, Argentina) described by Salgado et al. (2009) and an alvarezsaurid femur from the same locality originally described as an ornithopod femur by Coria, Cambiaso & Salgado (2007), describe additional alvarezsaurid material from this locality, and interpret the studied fossils as likely bones of Bonapartenykus ultimus, providing new information on the body plan of members of Patagonykinae.
- A study on pneumatic structures in the vertebrae of cf. Bonapartenykus ultimus from the Allen Formation is published by Windholz et al. (2025).
- The conclusions of the study on the hearing acuity of Shuvuuia deserti published by Choiniere et al. (2021) are contested by Manley & Köppl (2025).
- Evidence of carnivory in the holotype of Bannykus is presented by Wang et al. (2025).
- Evidence from the study of limb morphology of non-avian maniraptorans and birds, interpreted as indicating that evolution of maniraptoran limbs was not solely driven by functional specialization for flight, is presented by Nebreda, Hernández Fernández & Marugán-Lobón (2025).
- Smith (2025) reconstructs the musculature of the pectoral girdle and forelimbs of Falcarius utahensis.
- Freimuth & Zanno (2025) describe new cranial material of Falcarius utahensis from the Cedar Mountain Formation (Utah, United States), providing new information on the skull anatomy of members of this species.
- A model for forelimb function of Nothronychus graffami, based on muscular reconstruction of Smith (2021), is presented by Smith (2025).
- Napoli et al. (2025) report evidence of presence of a pisiform in two newly prepared pennaraptoran specimens from the Upper Cretaceous strata from the Gobi Desert in Mongolia (Citipati cf. osmolskae and a troodontid), providing evidence of replacement of the ulnare by the pisiform before the origin of birds, and close to the origins of flight in theropods.
- Evidence indicating that digit loss and reduction of the rest of the forelimb in members of Oviraptorosauria were independent changes resulting from different evolutionary processes is presented by Mead, Funston & Brusatte (2025).
- Zhu et al. (2025) report the discovery of clutch of elongatoolithid eggs from the Upper Cretaceous Qiupa Formation (China), possibly produced by Yulong mini.
- Wang et al. (2025) report the discovery of elongatoolithid eggs from the Upper Cretaceous Zhangqiao Formation (Anhui, China), representing the first record of non-avian dinosaur eggs in the Hefei Basin.
- Foster, Norell & Balanoff (2025) describe two new specimens of Conchoraptor gracilis from the Baruungoyot Formation (Mongolia), present an updated diagnosis for Conchoraptor and differentiate C. gracilis from both Heyuannia yanshini and Khaan mckennai.
- Zhu et al. (2025) describe a new clutch of eggs assigned to the oospecies Nanhsiungoolithus chuetienensis, interpret the oogenera Montanoolithus, Reticuloolithus and Paraelongatoolithus as junior synonyms of the oogenus Nanhsiungoolithus, and interpret the studied eggs as indicating that dromaeosaurids and oviraptorids might have shared a similar clutch structure.
- New information on the structure and number of hindwing feathers in Microraptor is presented by Chotard et al. (2025), who report the first evidence of asymmetry of long metatarsal covert feathers in Microraptor, and report evidence of a configuration of feather layers in the hindwing of the studied taxon.
- Grosmougin et al. (2025) reconstruct the anatomy of the forewing of Microraptor on the basis of data from the study of four known and ten new specimens.
- Didactyl tracks likely produced by unenlagiine dromaeosaurids, and preserving traces likely left by claw on digit II resting on the substrate, are described from the Candeleros Formation (Argentina) by Heredia et al. (2025).
- Motta et al. (2025) study the phylogenetic affinities of unenlagiines, recover them as early-diverging members of Avialae, and support the inclusion of all Gondwanan paravians in the group.
- Description of the skeletal anatomy of Austroraptor cabazai is published by Motta & Novas (2025).
- Garros et al. (2025) study the histology of troodontid metatarsal bones from the Dinosaur Park Formation (Alberta, Canada), reporting evidence of pathologies in the studied fossil sample, and providing evidence of at least two different growth trajectories in the studied troodontids.
- Yun (2025) studies mandibular strength properties of troodontids, and interprets his findings as indicating that the anterior part of the snout might have been used for handling and grasping food items.
- Varricchio, Hogan & Gardner (2025) describe new troodontid material from the Two Medicine Formation (Montana, United States), and interpret Stenonychosaurus inequalis as a junior synonym of Troodon formosus.
- Evidence of similarities of fusion patterns of the axial column in Troodon formosus and extant emu is presented by Caldwell, Bedolla & Varricchio (2025).
- The first deinonychosaurian (probably troodontid) track from Japan is described from the Lower Cretaceous Kitadani Formation by Tsukiji, Hattori & Azuma (2025).
- Kiat et al. (2025) provides new information on the wing structure of Anchiornis huxleyi, report evidence of an irregular molt, and interpret the studied theropod as likely flightless.
- García-Gil et al. (2025) identify isolated theropod teeth from the Upper Cretaceous El Gallo Formation (Mexico) as belonging to dromaeosaurids, troodontids, maniraptorans of uncertain affinities and indeterminate theropods.
- Evidence from the study of isolated theropod teeth from the Molí del Baró-1 locality (Catalonia, Spain), interpreted as indicative of previously unrecognized diversity of paravians from the Ibero-Armorican island during the latest Cretaceous and of diverse feeding styles of the studied theropods, is presented by Castillo-Visa et al. (2025).

==== Sauropodomorph research ====
- Evidence from the study of vertebral columns of early-branching sauropodomorphs, interpreted as indicative of independent evolution of postcranial skeletal pneumaticity in sauropodomorphs, theropods and pterosauromorphs, is presented by Beeston et al. (2025).
- A study on the evolution of the morphology of the sauropodomorph astragalus, providing evidence of stepwise appearance of features seen in sauropods, is published by Lefebvre et al. (2025).
- Filek et al. (2025) calculate striking energy of the tail of Plateosaurus trossingensis, and argue that the tail of Plateosaurus could have been used for active defence.
- Description of a well-preserved specimen of Plateosaurus trossingensis from the Upper Triassic Klettgau Formation (Switzerland), preserving evidence of a pathology of its right scapula and humerus, is published by Dupuis et al. (2025), who diagnose the studied individual as likely affected by a chronic case of osteomyelitis.
- A study on the anatomy of the appendicular skeleton of Macrocollum itaquii is published by Fonseca, Bem & Müller (2025).
- Lania, Pabst & Scheyer (2025) describe the skull of a probable new massopodan taxon from the Late Triassic Klettgau Formation (Switzerland).
- Peyre de Fabrègues et al. (2025) describe new fossil material of Leyesaurus marayensis from the Balde de Leyes Formation (Argentina) and revise the anatomy of the holotype specimen of this species, identifying the holotype as a likely juvenile specimen.
- Mooney et al. (2025) describe fossil material of Massospondylus from the Lower Jurassic strata of the upper Elliot Formation (South Africa and Lesotho) including embryos within eggs and a hatchling, providing new information on the ontogeny of Massospondylus, and interpret the studied fossils as indicating that Massospondylus was quadrupedal during its early ontogeny and shifted to bipedalism later in life.
- Probable sauropodomorph (possibly basal sauropod) tracks are described from a new tracksite from the Norian Shahmirzad Formation (Shemshak Group; Iran) by Abbassi, Gharehbaghi & Maleki (2025).
- Toefy, Krupandan & Chinsamy (2025) study the bone histology of two sauropodiform specimens and one early sauropod from the Elliot Formation (South Africa), providing evidence that the three studied specimens underwent rapid growth but differed in the duration of uninterrupted growth, and argue that the change of growth dynamics throughout the evolutionary history of sauropodomorphs was more complex than a simple progression from slow, interrupted growth to fast, uninterrupted growth.
- Partial skull of an early member of Sauropodiformes, with long, sauropod-like teeth, is described from the Lower Jurassic Lufeng Formation (China) by Sundgren et al. (2025).
- Evidence of differences in dentition of Early Jurassic sauropods from the Cañadón Asfalto Formation (Argentina), possibly indicative of different feeding strategies and niche partitioning between sauropods from this formation, is presented by Gomez (2025).
- Description of the anatomy of the appendicular skeleton of Bagualia alba is published by Gomez et al. (2025), who also study morphological diversity of sauropodomorphs throughout their evolutionary history, and report evidence of shifts in morphospace occupation during the Jurassic related to the diversification of early sauropods and extinction of other sauropodomorphs, as well as to subsequent diversification of Neosauropoda.
- Gomez et al. (2025) reconstruct the brain and inner ear of Bagualia alba, and interpret their anatomy as indicative of gradual sensory changes during sauropod evolution.
- Ren et al. (2025) interpret the restricted distribution of mamenchisaurids in eastern China during the Late Jurassic and their migrations to other regions as possibly linked to environmental changes resulting from volcanic activity in the Tunxi Basin (China).
- Kaikaew, Suteethorn & Chinsamy (2025) describe a pathologic mamenchisaurid ulna from the Early Cretaceous Phu Kradung Formation (Thailand), and diagnose the studied specimen as affected by an osteogenic tumor.
- Yang et al. (2025) study the bone histology of Mamenchisaurus guangyuanensis.
- Saleiro & Tschopp (2025) describe a previously unstudied collection of sauropod teeth from the Upper Jurassic strata in Portugal, identified as belonging to members of Turiasauria, Flagellicaudata, Camarasauridae and Titanosauriformes.
- Winkler et al. (2025) study tooth wear in Late Jurassic sauropods from Portugal, Tanzania and United States, and interpret their findings as consistent with a narrow dietary niche of camarasaurids and likely with their seasonal migrations following the availability of their preferred food source, with niche differentiation between camarasaurids and turiasaurs in Portugal, with a broad dietary niche and seasonal variation in diet in diplodocoids (possibly linked to limited migration compared to camarasaurids), and with consumption of food including more abrasives (possibly stemming from a nearby desert) by titanosauriforms from Tanzania compared to the ones from Portugal.
- Sauropod teeth identified as the oldest turiasaurian fossils from Africa reported to date are described from the Middle Jurassic El Mers III Formation (Morocco) by Woodruff et al. (2025).
- Lee & Slowiak (2025) propose a methodology to determine the preferred walking speeds of sauropods, focused on Diplodocus, Brachiosaurus, and Argentinosaurus.
- Dinosaur tracks from the Kimmeridgian strata from the Villette tracksite (France), sharing similarities with tracks attributed to thyreophorans, are identified as more likely to be tracks of a small-bodied sauropod by Sciscio et al. (2025).
- Mannion & Moore (2025) study the anatomy and phylogenetic relationships of Tharosaurus indicus, finding no evidence confirming its purported diplodocoid affinities, and reevaluate the phylogenetic relationships of diplodocoid sauropods.
- Eiamlaor et al. (2025) study pneumatic structures of cervical vertebrae of Phuwiangosaurus and a diplodocoid from the Sao Khua Formation (Thailand), and propose that Phuwiangosaurus was a titanosauriform more closely related to brachiosaurids than to Somphospondyli.
- Evidence from the microscopic analysis of cervical vertebra of Diplodocus and Apatosaurus and from the analysis of gross-scale structures in the cervical vertebra of Diplodocus, Apatosaurus and Camarasaurus, interpreted as suggestive of presence of a supraspinal ligament system as well as an interlaminar elastic ligament system in sauropod necks, is presented by Williams & Harris (2025).
- Review of history of studies on diplodocoid sauropods and of status of research on their phylogeny, morphology, ecology, ontogeny and biogeography is published by van der Linden et al. (2025).
- Bivens, Greenfield & Curtice (2025) determine that the sauropod name "Barosaurus africanus var. gracilis", though originally nomenclaturally unavailable, was made available as a subspecies name by Chure & McIntosh (1989), tentatively classify the sauropod as a species of Tornieria (T. gracilis) and designate a lectotype for this species.
- Gallagher et al. (2025) report evidence of preservation of microbodies within epidermis in the scales of juvenile specimens of Diplodocus sp. from the Mother's Day Quarry, (Morrison Formation; Montana, United States), identified as probable fossil melanosomes; their conclusions are criticized by Rossi & McNamara (2026).
- A revision of the known material assigned to the genus Haplocanthosaurus is published by Boisvert et al. (2025).
- A study on the morphology of teeth, their replacement process and possible feeding ecology of Bajadasaurus pronuspinax is published by Garderes (2025).
- Militello, Otero & Carballido (2025) reconstruct the neck muscles inserting in the occiput of Amargasaurus cazaui, and determine probable browsing positions of its neck.
- Lerzo & Gallina (2025) redescribe the left ilium of Cathartesaura anaerobica, and interpret its anatomy as consistent with the invasion of the space within the ilium by parts of the abdominal air sac that provided resistance to the thin ilium.
- Páramo et al. (2025) study the evolution of the hindlimb morphology of titanosauriform sauropods, and find that morphological adaptations related to wide-gauge posture were initially related to increasing body size, but also that they not longer correlated with changes in body size in the later evolutionary history of Somphospondyli, once fully acquired within the group.
- A study on the range of motion of the vertebral series in the tail of Giraffatitan brancai is published by Díez Díaz et al. (2025).
- Redescription of Liaoningotitan sinensis is published by Shan (2025).
- Large fusioolithid eggs with thin eggshells, produced by titanosaurs, are described from the Upper Cretaceous Villalba de la Sierra Formation (Spain) by Sanguino et al. (2025), who name a new ootaxon Litosoolithus poyosi.
- Titanosaur tracks preserving details of the skin and soft tissue anatomy, including evidence of variation in scale morphology on feet and evidence that unguals on digits I and II of feet were largely covered in skin, are described from the Cretaceous strata from the Nemegt locality in Mongolia by Bell et al. (2025).
- Fronimos & Woodward (2025) study histology of ribs of a titanosaur specimen from the Upper Cretaceous strata in Texas, reporting evidence of bone remodeling also seen in appendicular skeletons of other titanosaurs, as well as evidence indicating that growth did not cease simultaneously in all ribs of the studied individual.
- A titanosaur astragalus with a morphology closer to astragali of older titanosaurs from Asia, Australia and South America than those of contemporary titanosaurs is described from the uppermost Cretaceous strata of the Lameta Formation (India) by Wilson Mantilla et al. (2025).
- Poropat et al. (2025) identify gut contents of a specimen of Diamantinasaurus matildae from the Cretaceous Winton Formation (Australia), providing evidence of bulk feeding and multi-level browsing resulting in consumption of conifers, seed ferns and flowering plants by the studied sauropod.
- Gomes Nascimento et al. (2025) summarize the records of titanosaurs from the Bauru Group (Brazil).
- Fossil material of lithostrotian titanosaurs assigned to two morphotypes, including caudal vertebrae preserved with rare pathological features, is described from the Upper Cretaceous Cambambe Basin (Brazil) by Lacerda et al. (2025).
- Averianov et al. (2025) describe the first cervical vertebra referrable to Tengrisaurus starkovi, and recover it as a basal member of Colossosauria in an updated phylogenetic study including this new material.
- Matteoni, Bellardini & Romano (2025) describe new fossil material of titanosaurs from the Santonian Bajo de la Carpa Formation (Argentina), providing probable evidence of presence of members of Saltasauridae (the earliest record of the group from the Neuquén Basin reported to date) and Colossosauria within the same stratigraphic horizon.
- A study on the histology of the caudal vertebrae of Rocasaurus muniozi is published by Fernández, Windholz & Zurriaguz (2025), who find fibres that might be histological correlates for skeletal pneumaticity to be present but uncommon in the studied bones.
- A study on the anatomy of the atlas and axis of Neuquensaurus australis is published by Zurriaguz et al. (2025).
- Kim et al. (2025) study sauropod eggs from the Lower Cretaceous Sihwa Formation (South Korea), and report evidence of sauropods laying eggs on high ground encircled by water-filled channels within a braided river system, protecting their nests with channels serving as natural moats but risking floodings.
- Sauropod bones affected by osteomyelitis and preserving evidence of distinct manifestations of bone remodeling are described from the Santonian strata from the Ibirá locality (São José do Rio Preto Formation, Bauru Group, Brazil) by Aureliano et al. (2025).
- Silva Junior et al. (2025) study the resistance of femora of Diplodocus sp., Amargasaurus cazaui, Giraffatitan brancai, Dreadnoughtus schrani, Uberabatitan ribeiroi, Australotitan cooperensis and Neuquensaurus australis to stresses endured while the sauropods assumed bipedal stance, and argue that smaller sauropods such as saltasaurids were able to sustain a bipedal stance for extended periods.
- Ruiz et al. (2025) estimate the maximum speed capabilities of Dicraeosaurus sattleri, Barosaurus lentus, Diplodocus longus, Camarasaurus grandis, Antarctosaurus brasilensis, Cetiosaurus oxoniensis, Apatosaurus louisae, Turiasaurus riodevensis, Brachiosaurus altithorax, Patagotitan mayorum and Argentinosaurus huinculensis.

=== Ornithischian research ===
- Romilio et al. (2025) describe new ornithischian footprints from the Lower Jurassic Precipice Sandstone (Queensland, Australia), and reaffirm the prevalence of ornithischian footprints across the Early Jurassic dinosaur tracksites from Australia.
- Description of the anatomy of the postcranial skeleton of Manidens condorensis is published by Becerra et al. (2025).
- Barrett & Maidment (2025) revise the type material of Nanosaurus agilis, N. rex, Laosaurus celer, L. gracilis, L. consors and Drinker nisti, interpret these taxa as nomina dubia, and report the presence of dental and skull features in the fossil material of Drinker which were also present in pachycephalosaurs.

==== Thyreophoran research ====
- Sánchez-Fenollosa & Cobos (2025) describe a partial cranium and cervical vertebra referrable to Dacentrurus armatus from the Upper Jurassic Villar del Arzobispo Formation (Spain), representing the most complete stegosaurian skull from Europe reported to date, and provide a revised taxonomy and phylogenetic nomenclature of stegosaurs, naming a new clade Neostegosauria.
- Costa et al. (2025) examine new fossil and historical data about Miragaia longicollum, rejecting a possible synonymy with Dacentrurus.
- Maidment et al. (2025) describe a new specimen of Spicomellus afer, confirming its ankylosaurian status and expanding on the anatomy of this genus.
- Rivera-Sylva et al. (2025) describe new fossil material of members of Ankylosauria from the Upper Cretaceous strata in Coahuila (Mexico), including fossils from the Maastrichtian Cañon del Tule Formation representing the youngest records of the group from Mexico reported to date.
- Cross, Fraass & Arbour (2025) study the variation in ankylosaur tooth morphology, find that multiple lines of evidence are needed for taxonomic identification of isolated ankylosaur teeth, and interpret the studied variation as possibly related to different dietary niches of ankylosaur subgroups.
- Kirkland et al. (2025) describe new fossil material of Mymoorapelta maysi from the strata of the Morrison Formation from its type locality in the Mygatt-Moore Quarry (Colorado, United States), and support the classification of Mymoorapelta and Gargoyleosaurus as distinct taxa.
- Álvarez Nogueira et al. (2025) report fragmentary remains of a possible parankylosaurian from the Allen Formation (Argentina), likely representing a taxon distinct from the coeval Patagopelta.
- Zheng et al. (2025) study the bone histology of two specimens of Liaoningosaurus paradoxus, finding that the studied specimens are juveniles, one of which is the first known definitive hatchling ankylosaur.
- Treiber et al. (2025) report the first discovery of fossil material of Struthiosaurus sp. from the Maastrichtian strata of the Haţeg Basin known as "Bărbat Formation" or "Pui Beds" (Romania), and review the ankylosaur fossil record from Transylvania.
- Arbour et al. (2025) describe tracks produced by ankylosaurids from the Cenomanian Kaskapau Formation and Dunvegan Formation (British Columbia and Alberta, Canada), interpreted as evidence of the presence of ankylosaurids in North America prior to the Campanian and their coexistence with non-ankylosaurid ankylosaurs during the mid-Cretaceous, and name a new ichnotaxon Ruopodosaurus clava.
- Yoon et al. (2025) identify probable ankylosaurid tracks, referred to as cf. Ruopodosaurus, from the Cenomanian Jindong Formation (South Korea).

==== Cerapod research ====
- Maidment et al. (2025) describe a fragmentary femur from the Middle Jurassic El Mers III Formation (Morocco) representing the oldest known fossil of a cerapodan dinosaur.
- A partial skeleton of a possible cerapodan dinosaur from the Middle Jurassic Kilmaluag Formation (United Kingdom) is described by Panciroli et al. (2025), representing the most complete non-avian dinosaur fossil found from Scotland to date.
- Pintore, Houssaye & Hutchinson (2025) compare the morphology of the femora of 35 ornithopod species and their adaptations to changes of body mass and locomotor habits throughout the evolutionary history of ornithopods, and interpret their findings as consistent with predominant quadrupedalism in hadrosaurids and varying amounts of bipedalism and quadrupedalism in other ornithopods.
- Description of a well-preserved skull of a juvenile specimen of Jeholosaurus shangyuanensis from the Lower Cretaceous Yixian Formation (China) and a study on the phylogenetic relationships of this species is published by Bertozzo et al. (2025).
- A study on the bone histology of Notohypsilophodon comodorensis and Sektensaurus sanjuanboscoi, as well as on the evolution on elasmarians and on their environment, is published by Ibiricu et al. (2025).
- A partial hindlimb of an ornithopod with probable elasmarian affinities, representing the most complete small-bodied ornithopod specimen from the Cenomanian Griman Creek Formation (Australia) reported to date, is described by Bell et al. (2025).
- Maíllo et al. (2025) study bone histology of a partial skeleton of a subadult ornithopod individual from the Cretaceous Maestrazgo Basin (Spain), providing evidence of variability of histology of bone elements used for studies of the skeletochronology of ornithopod specimens, depending on the studied taxon.
- Lucas, Ricketts & Dalman (2025) describe fossil material of cf. Tenontosaurus sp. from the Cretaceous (Aptian/Albian) strata of the Yucca Formation (Texas, United States), representing the southernmost record of a tenontosaur in the North American Western Interior reported to date.
- An anomoepodid track produced by a tracemaker with possible rhabdodontid affinity is described from the Campanian strata of Roztocze hills (Poland) by Gierliński, Jachymek & Szrek (2025).
- Guillermo-Ochoa et al. (2025) describe a track of a small ornithopod from the Albian-Turonian Arcurquina Formation (Peru), likely produced during an underwater locomotion.
- Devereaux et al. (2025) describe the cranial endocast of Fostoria dhimbangunmal.
- Sánchez-Fenollosa et al. (2025) describe new fossil material of ornithopods from the Upper Jurassic Villar del Arzobispo Formation (Spain), confirming the presence of large-bodied ankylopollexians in the studied area and providing the first evidence of presence of dryosaurids and small-sized ankylopollexians.
- Fossil material of a previously unrecognized, large-sized, early-diverging member of Ankylopollexia is described from the Upper Jurassic beds of the Lusitanian Basin (Portugal) by Rotatori et al. (2025).
- New ornithopod fossil material, interpreted as likely representing the oldest fossil material of members of Styracosterna from the Early Cretaceous of the Iberian Peninsula reported to date, is described from the Valanginian-Hauterivian strata of the Oncala or Enciso Group from the El Horcajo site (Spain) by García-Palou, Isasmendi & Torices (2025).
- A study on the ecology of Iguanodon bernissartensis as indicated by strontium and oxygen isotope composition of remains from Bernissart (Belgium) is published by Decrée et al. (2025), who interpret their findings as indicating that I. bernissartensis was likely a non-migratory animal living in environment with marked seasonality.
- A hadrosauroid humerus representing the oldest record of a member of the group from the Transylvanian Basin reported to date is described from the Campanian Sebeș Formation (Romania) by Ebner et al. (2025).
- Jiménez-Moreno et al. (2025) use mathematical models and modern ecological analogs to infer the population dynamics of Mexican hadrosauroids based on their estimated body mass, and suggest that smaller species had a higher average density compared to larger species, which had a lower average density.
- Bertozzo et al. (2025) identify damage to vertebral neural spines in tails of hadrosaurid specimens, interpreted as possible evidence of mating-related injuries.
- Qiu et al. (2025) describe eggshell fragments of Stromatoolithus pinglingensis from the Upper Cretaceous Tangbian Formation (China) and revise "Paraspheroolithus" porcarboris from the Upper Cretaceous Argiles et Grès à Reptiles Formation, reinterpreting it as an oospecies of Stromatoolithus and the first evidence of hadrosaurid eggs reported from France.
- The partial skeleton of a hadrosaurid interpreted as the first member of the tribe Lambeosaurini reported from the Upper Cretaceous strata from South China is described from the Dalangshan Formation by Wang et al. (2025).
- Evidence of different mechanical performances of the jaws of Corythosaurus casuarius and Gryposaurus notabilis, possibly related to niche partitioning, is presented by Dudgeon & Evans (2025).
- Aureliano et al. (2025) study the internal vertebral microanatomy of Huallasaurus australis, finding evidence of resemblance of the vertebral vascular pattern to that of Silesaurus and no evidence of presence of invasive air sac diverticula.
- Bert et al. (2025) calculate resting and maximum metabolic rates of neonates of Maiasaura peeblesorum, interpreted as consistent with a physiology more similar to those of extant fast-growing endotherms than those of extant reptiles, and interpret Maiasaura as most likely altricial.
- Van der Reest et al. (2025) describe fossil material of Edmontosaurus sp. representing the first dinosaur elements from the Upper Cretaceous Brazeau Formation (Alberta, Canada) diagnosable to the genus level.
- Sereno et al. (2025) study the preservation of fossilized integument in "mummies" of two specimens (a late juvenile and an early adult) of Edmontosaurus annectens from the Lance Formation (Wyoming, United States), and report evidence of presence of a fleshy midline over the trunk of the juvenile specimen, as well as evidence of presence of wedge-shaped pedal hooves and a spike row spanning from hips to tail tip in the adult specimen.
- Sharpe et al. (2025) provide new information on the morphology of the hadrosaurid specimen from the Wapiti Formation (Alberta, Canada) preserving evidence of a soft tissue comb that was described by Bell et al. (2014), based on the study of the right side of the skull and the previously undescribed left side, and interpret the studied individual as likely representing a taxon belonging to Edmontosaurini that was distinct from both Edmontosaurus regalis and Edmontosaurus annectens.
- Wroblewski (2025) describes fossil material of Stygimoloch spinifer from the Maastrichtian Ferris Formation (Wyoming, United States), representing the southernmost record of the species reported to date.
- Ishikawa et al. (2025) use computed tomography to describe a psittacosaurid skull similar to the holotype of Hongshanosaurus houi, and reinterpret this species as belonging to a distinct taxon in the genus Psittacosaurus, coining the new combination P. houi.
- Wang et al. (2025) report gastroliths in a specimen consisting of 13 juvenile Psittacosaurus skeletons.
- Redescription of the anatomy of the skull of Archaeoceratops oshimai and a study on the phylogenetic relationships of basal ceratopsians is published by Wang, Zhang & You (2025).
- A study on the bone histology and growth of Liaoceratops yanzigouensis is published by Guo, He & Zhao (2025).
- Yun & Czepiński (2025) study changes of skull and mandible traits in Bagaceratops rozhdestvenskyi and Protoceratops andrewsi during their ontogeny, report evidence indicating that juveniles of the studied species were capable of feeding themselves, and possible evidence of a dietary shift during their ontogeny.
- Mallon et al. (2025) attributed a new parietal to Spinops found in the Dinosaur Park Formation (Canada, Saskatchewan).
- Mallon et al. (2025) report that fossil material of only one species of Triceratops (T. prorsus) was found in the lower Scollard Formation (Alberta, Canada) and Frenchman Formation (Saskatchewan, Canada), contemporaneous with the upper third of the Hell Creek Formation that also contains fossil material of T. prorsus, and interpret the fossil record of Triceratops as consistent with anagenetic relationship between the Triceratops horridus and T. prorsus.
- Obuszewski, Smith & Brown (2025) study the histology of cranial ornaments of Triceratops horridus, providing evidence of unexpected variability based on sampling location.
- Enriquez et al. (2025) compare scale growth in Chasmosaurus belli, Prosaurolophus maximus and extant reptiles, and find that scale shapes were mostly retained through growth in the studied taxa.

== Birds ==
=== New bird taxa ===
Name	Novelty	Status	Authors	Age	Type locality	Country	Notes	Images
Aenigmatorhynchus	Gen. et sp. nov	Valid	Mayr & Smith	Eocene	Messel Formation	Germany	A bird of uncertain affinities. The type species is A. rarus.	
Aeviperditus	Gen. et sp. nov	Valid	Steell et al.	Miocene	Bannockburn Formation	New Zealand	A possible bowerbird. The type species is A. gracilis.	
Amazonetta cubensis	Sp. nov	Valid	Zelenkov	Pleistocene		Cuba	A duck related to the Brazilian teal.	
Apus boanoi	Sp. nov		Pavia et al.	Pliocene	Langebaanweg	South Africa	A swift, a species of Apus	
Archaeodyptes	Gen. et sp. nov	Valid	Mayr et al.	Paleocene	Waipara Greensand	New Zealand	An early-diverging sphenisciform. The type species is A. waitahaorum.	
Astur cimmerius	Sp. nov	Valid	Zelenkov & Gorbatcheva	Pleistocene		Crimea	A species of Astur.	
Australarus	Gen. et sp. nov		De Pietri et al.	Miocene	Bannockburn Formation	New Zealand	A member of the family Laridae. The type species is A. bakeri.	
Baminornis	Gen. et sp. nov	Valid	Chen et al.	Late Jurassic (Tithonian)	Nanyuan Formation	China	An early avialan bearing a pygostyle. The type species is B. zhenghensis.	
Chromeornis	Gen. et sp. nov	Valid	O'Connor et al.	Early Cretaceous (Aptian)	Jiufotang Formation	China	An enantiornithean in the family Longipterygidae. The type species is C. funkyi.	
Consoravis	Gen. et sp. nov		Ksepka et al.	Eocene	Green River Formation	United States (Wyoming)	A member of the family Morsoravidae. The type species is C. turdirostris.	
Daniadyptes	Gen. et sp. nov	Valid	Mayr et al.	Paleocene	Waipara Greensand	New Zealand	An early-diverging sphenisciform. The type species is D. primaevus.	
Fucadytes	Gen. et sp. nov	Valid	Mayr & Goedert	Oligocene	Makah Formation	United States (Washington)	A member of the family Plotopteridae belonging to the subfamily Tonsalinae. The type species is F. discrepans.	
Gobicathartes	Gen. et sp. nov		Gorbatcheva, Zelenkov & Bertelli	Eocene	Ergilin Dzo Formation	Mongolia	A New World vulture. The type species is G. prodigialipes.	
Gracanicanetta	Gen. et sp. nov	Valid	Bocheński et al.	Miocene (Langhian)		Bosnia and Herzegovina	A duck. The type species is G. happi.	
Gracilisgallus	Gen. et sp. nov	Valid	Yu & Li	Late Miocene-early Pliocene	Linxia Basin (upper Liushu Formation to lower Hewangjia Formation)	China	A member of the family Phasianidae. The type species is G. linxia.	
Hunucornis	Gen. et sp. nov		Agnolín et al.	Miocene	Las Flores Formation	Argentina	A grebe. Genus includes new species H. huayanen.	
Kunpengornis	Gen. et sp. nov	In press	Huang et al.	Early Cretaceous	Jiufotang Formation	China	A euornithean. The type species is K. anhuimusei. Announced in 2025; the final article version will be published in 2026.	
Masillaraptor buchheimi	Sp. nov	Valid	Li et al.	Eocene	Green River Formation	United States (Wyoming)	A member of the family Masillaraptoridae; a species of Masillaraptor.	
Miolarus	Gen. et sp. nov		De Pietri et al.	Miocene	Bannockburn Formation	New Zealand	A member of the family Laridae. The type species is M. rectirostrum.	
Miostrepera	Gen. et sp. nov	Valid	Worthy et al.	Miocene	Bannockburn Formation	New Zealand	A member of the family Artamidae belonging to the subfamily Cracticinae. The type species is M. canora	
Novavis	Gen. et sp. nov	Valid	O'Connor et al.	Early Cretaceous	Xiagou Formation	China	An enantiornithean. The type species is N. pubisculata.	
Palaelodus haroldocontii	Sp. nov		Agnolín et al.	Miocene	Las Flores Formation	Argentina		
?Parvigrus ypresiensis	Sp. nov	Valid	Mayr & Kitchener	Eocene (Ypresian)	London Clay	United Kingdom	A member of the family Parvigruidae.	
?Pseudocrypturus danielsi	Sp. nov	Valid	Mayr & Kitchener	Eocene (Ypresian)	London Clay	United Kingdom	A member of the family Lithornithidae; a species of Pseudocrypturus.	
?Pseudocrypturus gracilipes	Sp. nov	Valid	Mayr & Kitchener	Eocene (Ypresian)	London Clay	United Kingdom	A member of the family Lithornithidae; a species of Pseudocrypturus.	
Pujatopouli	Gen. et sp. nov		Irazoqui et al.	Late Cretaceous (Maastrichtian)	López de Bertodano Formation	Antarctica	A probable member of Neoaves with affinities with the group Aequornithes. The type species is P. soberana. Announced in 2025; the final article version will be published in 2026.	
Scopsoides	Gen. et sp. nov	Valid	Mayr	Eocene	Messel Formation	Germany	A member of the family Halcyornithidae. The type species is S. feisti.	
Shargaotis	Gen. et sp. nov	Valid	Zelenkov	Miocene		Mongolia	A bustard. The type species is S. ignipes. Published online in 2026, but the issue date is listed as December 2025.	
Shuilingornis	Gen. et sp. nov	Valid	Wang et al.	Early Cretaceous	Jiufotang Formation	China	A euornithean in the family Gansuidae. The type species is S. angelai. Announced in 2024; the final article version was published in 2025.	
Tadorna rekohu	Sp. nov	Valid	Rawlence et al.	Holocene		New Zealand	A shelduck, a species of Tadorna.	
Waimanutaha	Gen. et sp. nov	Valid	Mayr et al.	Paleocene	Waipara Greensand	New Zealand	An early-diverging sphenisciform. The type species is W. kenlovei.	
Waiparadyptes	Gen. et sp. nov	Valid	Mayr et al.	Paleocene	Waipara Greensand	New Zealand	An early-diverging sphenisciform. The type species is W. gracilitarsus.	
Waltonius	Gen. et sp. nov	Valid	Mayr & Kitchener	Eocene (Ypresian)	London Clay	United Kingdom	A stone-curlew or a bird with affinities with this group. The type species is W. burhinoides.	
Zqueheanas	Gen. et sp. nov		Agnolín et al.	Miocene	Las Flores Formation	Argentina	A duck belonging to the subfamily Tadorninae. Genus includes new species Z. hebe.	

=== Avian research ===
- Review of the Mesozoic fossil record of avian soft tissue traces is published by O'Connor (2025).
- A study on the evolution of the ability of birds to move parts of the skull independently is published by Wilken et al. (2025), who link the appearance of this ability to changes of skeletal anatomy and musculature related to the expansion of neurocranium.
- Lowi-Merri et al. (2025) study the evolution of the sternum in the bird stem group, and find evidence of episodic acquisition of sternal traits related to adaptations to flight in members of the group progressively closer to extant birds.
- Lo Coco et al. (2025) reconstruct the musculature of the pectoral girdle of Bambiraptor feinbergi, Buitreraptor gonzalezorum, Archaeopteryx lithographica and Confuciusornis sanctus, finding no evidence of radical changes in the function of the pectoral muscles in the studied taxa, and argue that the continuous flapping flight seen in extant birds might have evolved at the Ornithothoraces node rather than in more basal birds.
- New specimen of Archaeopteryx, representing the third specimen belonging to this genus found in the Tithonian Mörnsheim Formation (Germany), is described by Foth et al. (2025).
- O'Connor et al. (2025) describe the Chicago specimen of Archaeopteryx, providing new information on the skeletal anatomy, soft tissues and feathers of Archaeopteryx.
- O'Connor et al. (2025) report probable evidence of presence of the bill tip organ and oral papillae in the Chicago specimen of Archaeopteryx, as well evidence of presence of a basihyal in this specimen suggestive of increased mobility of the tongue, and indicating that rostral features that increase feeding efficiency in extant birds appeared early in avian evolution, possibly in relation to increased caloric demands caused by flight.
- Duan et al. (2025) present the first three-dimensional reconstruction of the forelimb of Confuciusornis, and provide new information on its anatomy.
- A study on the skeletal anatomy and phylogenetic affinities of Iberomesornis romerali is published by Castro-Terol et al. (2025).
- Evidence of preservation of melanosome structures in a head crest feather of a member of the genus Shangyang from the Lower Cretaceous Jiufotang Formation (China), interpreted as indicative of red to deep blue iridescent coloration, is presented by Li et al. (2025).
- Salgado et al. (2025) describe disarticulated fish remains associated with the holotype specimen of Cratoavis cearensis, interpreted as contents of the digestive tract of the studied bird.
- A study on the bone histology of Avimaia schweitzerae, Novavis pubisculata and Qiliania graffini is published by Atterholt, O'Connor & You (2025).
- Fossil material of a bird which might represent a previously unrecognized ornithuromorph species is described from the Lower Cretaceous strata of the Yixian Formation from the Chedaogou locality (Hebei, China) by Wang et al. (2025).
- A bird trackway with similarities to tracks produced by herons is described from the Cenomanian Dunvegan Formation (British Columbia, Canada) by Lockley, Plint & Helm (2025).
- Wilson et al. (2025) report the discovery of a new avialan assemblage from the Upper Cretaceous Prince Creek Formation (Alaska, United States), preserving fossils of crown or near-crown birds as well as members of Hesperornithes and Ichthyornithes, and providing the oldest evidence of birds nesting at polar latitudes reported to date.
- A study on correlates of soft tissues that were parts of the respiratory system and spinal vasculature in the vertebra of Ichthyornis dispar and Janavis finalidens is published by Atterholt et al. (2025), who report the first known evidence of presence of paramedullary diverticula in Mesozoic birds.
- Crane et al. (2025) report evidence of morphological similarities in the mandibles of Ichthyornis, Vegavis and pelagornithids, and well as evidence from the study of the mandibular morphology of Asteriornis supporting its galloanseran affinites.
- Evidence from the study of extant and extinct members of the crown group of birds, indicative of impact of correlated trait evolution of skeletal and soft tissues on the head shape in crown birds, is presented by Knapp et al. (2025).
- Widrig et al. (2025) study the flight capabilities of Lithornis promiscuus, and interpret the studied bird as capable of continuous flapping and/or mixed flapping and gliding, rather than only tinamou-like burst flight, and as capable of long-distance flight.
- Evidence from the study of moa coprolites, indicating that moa ate and likely spread truffle-like fungi that are endemic to New Zealand, is presented by Boast et al. (2025).
- Thomas et al. (2025) describe a probable moa trackway from the Pleistocene Karioitahi Group (New Zealand), and name a new ichnotaxon Tapuwaemoa manunutahi.
- Sánchez-Marco et al. (2025) interpret the ratite eggs from the Pliocene strata from Lanzarote (the Canary Islands) as more likely to represent two egg morphotypes produced by a single ratite (probably ostrich) species than evidence of presence of two ratite species on the island.
- A study on hearing capabilities of dromornithids is published by McInerney, Handley & Worthy (2025), who consider their findings to be consistent with the interpretation of the studied birds as low-frequency sound producers.
- Torres et al. (2025) report the discovery of a new, nearly complete skull of Vegavis iaai, interpret its morphology as supporting phylogenetic affinities of Vegavis with Anseriformes, and report evidence of the presence of a feeding apparatus different from those of extant members of Anseriformes but similar to those of extant birds that capture prey underwater.
- Zonneveld, Naone & Britt (2025) describe foraging traces produced by waterbirds (possibly by Presbyornis pervetus) from the Eocene Green River Formation (Utah, United States), and name new ichnotaxa Erevnoichnus blochis, E. strimmena, Ravdosichnus guntheri and Aptosichnus diatarachi.
- Mayr & Kitchener (2025) report the first discovery of leg bones of Nettapterornis oxfordi from the Eocene London Clay (United Kingdom), study the phylogenetic relationships of the species, and name a new family Nettapterornithidae.
- Van der Meer et al. (2025) study the Quaternary duck diversity of Doggerland, identifying 12 species that were previously unconfirmed in the Dutch fossil record, providing evidence of abundance of members of Mergini, and finding no evidence of presence of the common eider which is abundant in the studied area in modern times.
- Evidence of changes of composition of the galliform assemblage from the southern part of eastern Europe (within the territory of Ukraine) during the Late Pleistocene and Holocene is presented by Gorobets et al. (2025).
- Evidence from the study of phasianid eggs and nests from the stratigraphic sequence of Abocador de Can Mata (Spain), indicative of sustained philopatric behavior of the studied birds coinciding with local habitat fragmentation during the Middle–Late Miocene transition, is presented by Sellés et al. (2025).
- Fossil material of a capercaillie (Tetrao sp.) and a diver (Gavia cf. arctica) is described from the Pleistocene (Calabrian) strata from the Taurida cave (Crimea) by Zelenkov (2025).
- A study on the phylogenetic relationships of the dodo and the Rodrigues solitaire is published by Parish (2025).
- Evidence from the fossil material of great bustards from the Taforalt cave site (Morocco), indicating that great bustards were breeding in the studied area (300 km east of the range of extant great bustards in Morocco) during the Late Pleistocene and that they were exploited by people who occupied the site, is presented by Cooper et al. (2025).
- Stervander et al. (2025) study the affinities of members of the genus Nesotrochis and assign them to the separate family Nesotrochidae, recovered by the authors as a sister lineage of adzebills.
- Sangster et al. (2025) identify the Hodgens' Waterhen as a member of the genus Porzana on the basis of mitochondrial data, and propose to change its English name to New Zealand giant crake.
- Dos Santos Lima, de Araújo-Júnior & de Souza Barbosa (2025) describe a footprint of a shorebird from the Oligocene Tremembé Formation, representing the first fossil avian footprint reported from Brazil and expanding known geographical range of the ichnogenus Ardeipeda.
- Trace fossils interpreted as record of a mating dance behavior of a bird (probably a plover) are described from the Miocene Upper Red Formation (Iran) by Abbassi (2025).
- A coracoid of a loon, interpreted as the oldest fossil a member of the group in Asia reported to date, is described from the upper Miocene strata of the Hyargas Nuur 2 locality in western Mongolia by Zelenkov (2025).
- Evidence from analyses of contemporary records and fossil and historical range, indicative of broader range of breeding grounds of procellariiform birds from New Zealand in the past compared to the present, is presented by Bellvé et al. (2025).
- Tennyson et al. (2025) describe a largely complete skull of a member of the genus Aptenodytes from the Tangahoe Formation (New Zealand), exceeding the average skull length of the emperor penguin and providing evidence of presence of such penguins in temperate Zealandia during the Waipipian stage (mid-Piacenzian).
- The oldest plotopterid skull reported to date is described from the Eocene Lincoln Creek Formation (Washington, United States) by Mayr, Goedert & Richter (2025), who interpret the anatomy of the studied specimen as supporting the affinities of plotopterids with Suloidea.
- Mori (2025) describes a plotopterid tarsometatarsus from the Oligocene Yamaga Formation (Japan), preserving a unique combination of characteristics found in different plotopterid taxa and expanding known morphological diversity of plotopterids from Japan.
- Helm et al. (2025) describe bird tracks from new Pleistocene ichnosites from South Africa's Cape south coast, including the first global record of a hamerkop trackway.
- The first Cenozoic ignotornid footprints from South America reported to date, interpreted as most likely produced by an ibis, are described from the Miocene Vinchina Formation (Argentina) by Farina, Krapovickas & Marsicano (2025), who name a new ichnotaxon Gragliavipes gavenskii and review the Cretaceous and Cenozoic avian ichnofamilies.
- Citron et al. (2025) compare the anatomy of the sensory organs, nerves and brain of Apteribis and extant ibises, and interpret Apteribis as likely a nocturnal bird.
- Fragment of a tarsometatarsus of a New World vulture comparable in size with largest male specimens belonging to the genus Vultur is described from the Quaternary strata from the Canelón Chico locality (Uruguay) by Jones et al. (2025).
- Fossil plumage of a griffon vulture preserved in three dimensions is described from the Pleistocene strata of the Colli Albani volcanic complex (Italy) by Rossi et al. (2025).
- Hunt & Lucas (2025) describe a regurgitalite from the Eocene Messel Formation in Germany, preserving bird bones and likely representing the oldest known regurgitalite produced by an owl, as well a regurgitalite from the same formation preserving bones of a gecko and possibly produced by a raptor, name new ichnotaxa Paleostrigilithus mayri and Vomogecko messelensis, and interpret this finding as possible evidence of diurnal habits of Eocene owls.
- A study on the bone histology of Brontornis burmeisteri and Patagornis marshi is published by Garcia Marsà et al. (2025).
- Degrange, Tambussi & Witmer (2025) study the anatomy of skull regions of phorusrhacids associated with the loss of cranial kinesis, and report evidence of simplification of food-handling mechanics and increase of bite force throughout the evolutionary history of the group.
- Agnolin, Chafrat & Álvarez-Herrera (2025) describe new fossil material of Patagorhacos terrificus from the Miocene Chichinales Formation (Argentina), interpreted as supporting placement of the species within Phorusrhacidae.
- Purported brontornithid tibiotarsus from the La Venta locality in Colombia reported by Ortiz-Pabón et al. (2025) is reinterpreted as fossil material of a phorusrhacid by Degrange et al. (2025), providing possible evidence of presence of fossil material of two phorusrhacid taxa at the site.
- Horváth (2025) describes new fossil material of birds from the Miocene and Pliocene sites in Hungary, including 10 taxa new to the Hungarian Neogene avifauna.
- Marqueta et al. (2025) describe bird assemblages from the Pleistocene levels of the Galls Carboners and Cudó caves (Spain), reporting evidence of presence of the pine grosbeak or a similar bird, which is no longer present in the study area.
- Syverson & Prothero (2025) study changes of the size or robustness of birds from the La Brea Tar Pits, and find evidence of previously undetected changes in the studied taxa, but report no evidence of a clear relationship between those changes and changes in temperature.
- Costa et al. (2025) study the taxonomic composition of the bird assemblage from the Lajedo de Soledade site (Brazil) and reconstruct the diet of Pleistovultur nevesi from the studied site, interpreted as feeding on carcasses of animals living in open areas during the Late Pleistocene.
- Hering et al. (2025) describe subfossil bird burrows from the Tibesti Mountains (Chad), interpreted as possible nesting structures of birds such as bee-eaters, swallows or kingfishers living in the area during the African humid period.
- Zonneveld et al. (2025) revise traces produced by modern birds in marginal aquatic settings, and evaluate the possibilities of identification of such traces in the fossil record.

== Pterosaurs ==
=== New pterosaur taxa ===
Name	Novelty	Status	Authors	Age	Type locality	Country	Notes	Images
Bakiribu	Gen. et sp. nov	Disputed	Pêgas et al.	Early Cretaceous (Aptian-Albian)	Romualdo Formation	Brazil	A vertebrate of uncertain affinities. Originally described as a pterosaur belonging to the family Ctenochasmatidae; subsequently reinterpreted as an indeterminate ray-finned fish (possibly an amiid) by Unwin et al. (2026), who considered it to be a nomen dubium. The type species is B. waridza.	
Darwinopterus camposi	Sp. nov	Valid	Cheng et al.	Jurassic	Tiaojishan Formation	China	A member of the family Wukongopteridae; a species of Darwinopterus.	
Eotephradactylus	Gen. et sp. nov	Valid	Kligman et al.	Late Triassic	Chinle Formation	United States (Arizona)	An early-diverging pterosaur. The type species is E. mcintireae.	
Galgadraco	Gen. et sp. nov	Valid	Giaretta et al.	Late Cretaceous	Serra da Galga Formation	Brazil	A member of the family Azhdarchidae. The type species is G. zephyrius.	
Garudapterus	Gen. et sp. nov	Valid	Manitkoon et al.	Early Cretaceous	Khorat Group	Thailand	A member of the family Ctenochasmatidae belonging to the subfamily Gnathosaurinae. The type species is G. buffetauti.	
Gobiazhdarcho	Gen. et sp. nov	Valid	Pêgas, Zhou & Kobayashi	Late Cretaceous (Turonian–Santonian)	Bayanshiree Formation	Mongolia	A member of the family Azhdarchidae. The type species is G. tsogtbaatari.	
Infernodrakon	Gen. et sp. nov		Thomas et al.	Late Cretaceous (Maastrichtian)	Hell Creek Formation	United States (Montana)	A member of the family Azhdarchidae. The type species is I. hastacollis.	
Makrodactylus	Gen. et sp. nov	Valid	Hone et al.	Late Jurassic (Tithonian)	Mörnsheim Formation	Germany	A non-pterodactyloid monofenestratan. The type species is M. oligodontus.	
Nipponopterus	Gen. et sp. nov	Valid	Zhou et al.	Late Cretaceous	Mifune Group	Japan	A member of the family Azhdarchidae. The type species is N. mifunensis. Announced in 2024; the final article version was published in 2025.	
Saratovia	Gen. et sp. nov	Valid	Averianov	Late Cretaceous (Cenomanian)	Melovatka Formation	Russia (Saratov Oblast)	A member of Ornithocheirae belonging to the group Targaryendraconia. The type species is S. glickmani.	
Spathagnathus	Gen. et sp. nov	Valid	Fernandes et al.	Late Jurassic (Kimmeridgian)	Torleite Formation	Germany	A member of the family Ctenochasmatidae belonging to the subfamily Gnathosaurinae. The type species is S. roeperi.	
Tsogtopteryx	Gen. et sp. nov	Valid	Pêgas, Zhou & Kobayashi	Late Cretaceous (Turonian–Santonian)	Bayanshiree Formation	Mongolia	A member of the family Azhdarchidae. The type species is T. mongoliensis.	

=== Pterosaur research ===
- Evidence of higher laminarity rates of wing bones of pterosaurs compared to their hindlimb bones is presented by Araújo et al. (2025).
- A study on the presence, volume, and capacity of the cervical musculature of pterosaurs is published by Buchmann & Rodrigues (2025), who interpret the reconstructed musculature as consistent with surface fishing foraging habits of Rhamphorhynchus muensteri and members of the genus Anhanguera, and with capture of small terrestrial prey by Azhdarcho lancicollis.
- Buchmann & Rodrigues (2025) compare resistance of neck vertebrae of Anhanguera piscator and Azhdarcho lancicollis to muscular stresses, and interpret their findings as consistent with different foraging strategies of the studied pterosaurs.
- Hone & Prondvai (2025) review the state of knowledge on the structure and function of uropatagium between the legs of pterosaurs.
- Purported pterosaur tracks reported from the Lower Cretaceous Patuxent Formation (Virginia, United States) by Weems & Bachman (2023) are argued to be more likely results of erosion by McDavid & Thomas (2025).
- Bantim et al. (2025) describe two incomplete wing phalanges from the strata of the Romualdo Formation in Piauí (Brazil), extending known geographical range of pterosaurs in the Araripe Basin.
- Smyth et al. (2025) propose a catastrophic-attritional taphonomic model explaining the preservation of pterosaur fossils from the Solnhofen Limestone (Germany), interpreting small- to medium-sized pterosaur specimens as killed and quickly buried during storms, resulting in preservation of well-articulated specimens, while larger pterosaurs were preserved as fragmentary remains as a result of longer delay between their death and burial; the author also identify humeral fractures in early juvenile specimens of Pterodactylus antiquus interpreted as most likely resulting from excessive wing loading during flight, indicating that Pterodactylus was capable of taking flight at a very early age.
- A large, three-dimensionally preserved humerus of a scaphognathine rhamphorhynchid (cf. Harpactognathus gentryii), providing new information on the anatomy of members of this group, is described from the Upper Jurassic Morrison Formation (Wyoming, United States) by Sprague & McLain (2025).
- Hone & McDavid (2025) describe the largest known specimen of Rhamphorhynchus muensteri (wingspan 1.8 metres (5.9 ft)) from the Solnhofen Limestone (Germany) and discuss its implications for anatomical transformations through ontogeny in the genus and other rhamphorhynchines.
- Jagielska et al. (2025) describe the osteology of Dearc sgiathanach and reconstruct its cranial and antebrachial musculature.
- Smyth et al. (2025) identify three pterosaur tracks morphotypes as produced by trackmakers belonging to the groups Ctenochasmatoidea, Dsungaripteridae and Neoazhdarchia, and interpret the distribution of pterosaur tracks as consistent with a mid-Mesozoic radiation of pterodactyloid pterosaurs into terrestrial niches.
- Mazin & Pouech (2025) identify five morphotypes of small- to medium-sized pterodactyloid tracks from the Tithonian strata of the Crayssac site (France).
- de Araújo et al. (2025) study the flight-related adaptations of pterosaurs, including Caiuajara dobruskii, anhanguerids, and dsungaripteroids, in relation to their laminar bones.
- Hone, Lauer & Lauer (2025) report evidence of preservation of foot pad scales and webbing between the toes in a possible specimen of Germanodactylus cristatus from the Upper Jurassic strata from the Solnhofen region of Germany, as well as evidence of preservation of hand and foot soft tissues in a different pterodactyloid specimen reported from the Solnhofen Formation.
- Partial pterosaur humerus with similarities to the humerus of Cycnorhamphus suevicus is described from the Upper Jurassic strata in the Volga region (Russia) by Averianov & Lopatin (2025).
- A ctenochasmatid mandible representing the first finding of a pterodactyloid pterosaur fossil from the Upper Jurassic (Tithonian) Portland Limestone Formation (United Kingdom) is described by Smith & Martill (2025).
- Bennett (2025) revises Gnathosaurus subulatus and interprets both "Pterodactylus" micronyx and Aurorazhdarcho primordius as junior synonyms of this species.
- A study on tooth replacement in Forfexopterus is published by Zhou & Fan (2025).
- Redescription and a study on the affinities of Herbstosaurus pigmaeus is published by Ezcurra et al. (2025).
- Song et al. (2025) describe a pterosaur humerus from the Lower Cretaceous Lianmuqin Formation (China), interpreted as the first record of a member of Ornithocheiromorpha from the Tugulu Group.
- Xu, Jiang & Wang (2025) describe a new specimen of Hongshanopterus lacustris from the Lower Cretaceous Jiufotang Formation (China), providing new information on the anatomy of members of this species, and redescribe the holotype of Nurhachius ignaciobritoi.
- Pêgas (2025) presents a new phylogenetic analysis of Ornithocheiriformes, registers several pterosaur clades under the PhyloCode and names a new clade Anhangueroidea.
- An isolated tooth of a probable member of Ornithocheiriformes representing the first pterosaur fossil reported from the Lower Cretaceous Quiricó Formation (Brazil) is described by Fialho et al. (2025).
- Aureliano et al. (2025) study the histology of a tooth a member of Ornithocheiriformes from the Lower Cretaceous Crato Formation (Brazil), interpreted as consistent with earlier studies that recovered pterosaurs as having the most rapid tooth development among all members of Archosauriformes studied to date.
- Pêgas et al. (2025) interpret Cearadactylus atrox as a likely junior synonym of Brasileodactylus araripensis.
- Piazentin et al. (2025) describe a new mandible of Anhanguera robustus from the Romualdo Formation (Brazil), and reaffirm the validity of A. robustus.
- New specimen of Sinopterus preserving phytoliths and gastroliths in the abdominal cavity is described by Jiang et al. (2025), confirming hypotheses of herbivory in tapejarids.
- Lu et al. (2025) study the distribution of chemical elements in the holotype specimen of Sinopterus atavismus.
- The most complete skull and articulated lower jaw of Tupandactylus imperator reported to date, providing new information on the morphology of the skull of members of this species, is described from Crato Formation by Canejo, Sayão & Kellner (2025).
- Thomas & McDavid (2025) study the phylogenetic relationships of members of Azhdarchomorpha, revise their phylogenetic taxonomy, and name new clades Shenzhoupterinae, Concilazhia and Serpennata.
- Alhalabi et al. (2025) describe a fragmentary humerus of a large-bodied azhdarchid from the Maastrichtian strata from the Palmyrides mountain chain, representing the first pterosaur record from Syria and providing evidence of presence of azhdarchids in nearshore environments.
- Ortiz-David et al. (2025) study the taphonomy of the holotype and the paratype of Thanatosdrakon amaru, reporting evidence of rapid burial of the holotype and prolonged subaerial exposure of the paratype.
- The first pterosaur tracks from the Lower Cretaceous Botucatu Formation (Brazil), likely produced by a member of Azhdarchoidea, are described by Lacerda, Fernandes & Leonardi (2025).
- Probable azhdarchoid and ornithocheiroid tracks are identified in the Lower Cretaceous (Barremian-Aptian) strata of the Enciso Group (Spain) by Pascual-Arribas et al. (2025).
- A study on the trophic relationships between pterosaurs and other taxa from the Romualdo Formation (Brazil), as indicated by mercury concentrations in their fossil remains, is published by Antonietto et al. (2025), who interpret the studied ornithocheiraeans as feeding on small fishes, and interpret the studied thalassodromines as opportunistic generalists.
- Pinheiro et al. (2025) revise the taxonomy and paleobiology of Cretaceous pterosaurs from the Araripe Basin (Brazil).
- New fossil material of pterosaurs, including part of a metacarpal of an azhdarchoid and a vertebra of an indeterminate derived pterodactyloid, is described from the Campanian Cerro del Pueblo Formation (Mexico) by Rivera-Sylva et al. (2025).
- A fragment of a finger bone of an indeterminate diminutive pterosaur is described from the Maastrichtian strata from the Møns Klint Formation (Denmark) by Milàn, Jakobsen & Lindow (2025).
- Review of studies of pterosaur biomechanics, including their terrestrial locomotion and flight dynamics, is published by Costa et al. (2025).
- Ceroula et al. (2025) provide estimates of terrestrial locomotion capabilities of pterosaurs on the basis of the study of femora, humeri and body mass of 25 specimens.

== Other archosaurs ==
=== Other new archosaur taxa ===
Name	Novelty	Status	Authors	Age	Type locality	Country	Notes	Images
Alickmeron	Gen. et comb. nov.	Jr. synonym	Sen & Ray	Late Triassic (Norian)	Lower Maleri Formation	India	The type species is A. maleriensis (Chatterjee, 1987). Originally described as a lagerpetid; reinterpreted as an indeterminate member of Pan-Aves by McDavid, Marchant, & Reid (2026), who consider it an objective junior synonym of Alwalkeria.	
Gondwanax	Gen. et sp. nov	Valid	Müller	Middle–Late Triassic (Ladinian–early Carnian)	Pinheiros-Chiniquá Sequence of the Santa Maria Supersequence	Brazil	A sulcimentisaurian member of the possibly paraphyletic family Silesauridae. The type species is G. paraisensis. Announced in 2024; the final article version was published in 2025.	
Itaguyra	Gen. et sp. nov	Valid	Paes Neto et al.	Late Triassic (Carnian)	Santa Cruz Sequence of the Santa Maria Supersequence	Brazil	A "silesaurid". The type species is I. occulta.	

=== Other archosaur research ===
- Garcia & Müller (2025) revise the fossil record of probable pterosaur precursors from the Triassic strata of the Candelária Sequence of the Santa Maria Supersequence (Brazil) and study their phylogenetic affinities, recovering lagerpetids as an evolutionary grade ancestral to pterosaurs.
- Aureliano et al. (2025) compare the vertebra of the lagerpetid Venetoraptor gassenae and the pterosaur Caiuajara sp., and report evidence indicating that early signs of postcranial skeletal pneumaticity were already present in non-pterosaurian pterosauromorphs, and evidence of an increase of pneumatic complexity during pterosauromorph evolution.
- Tolchard, Perkins & Nesbitt (2025) describe new silesaurid fossil material from the base of the Dockum Group (Texas), providing evidence of continued presence of members of this group in the area of southwestern United States throughout the Late Triassic.
- Marsh (2025) identifies fossil material of a large silesaurid from the Petrified Forest Member of the Chinle Formation (Arizona, United States), and interpret both this specimen and a large coelophysoid theropod from the same locality as evidence of presence of large theropods and non-dinosaurian dinosauriforms in western North America before the Triassic–Jurassic extinction event.
- Lovegrove et al. (2025) describe a large silesaur femur from the Ladinian-Carnian Ntawere Formation (Zambia), and argue that the studied specimen and previously described silesaur femora from the same formation cannot be confidently referred to Lutungutali sitwensis.
- Probable new fossil material of Eucoelophysis baldwini is described from the strata of the Chinle Formation from the Hayden Quarry (New Mexico, United States) by Breeden et al. (2025).

== General research ==
- Evidence from the study of bone pneumaticity in extant birds, indicating that studies of skeletal pneumaticity in extinct archosaurs that don't take soft tissues in the internal bone cavities into account might overestimate the volume fraction of pneumatic bones that was composed of air, is presented by Burton et al. (2025).
- Byrne et al. (2025) report evidence from the study of extant amniotes indicating that lack of osteological and histological correlates of the avian style respiratory system such as pneumaticity or pneumosteum does not by itself rule out the possibility of presence of such respiratory system in fossil archosaurs, as these features can also be absent in extant birds that adapted to aquatic lifestyle or evolved small body size.
- Byrne et al. (2025) reconstruct the red blood cell size evolution in archosaurs on the basis of histological indicators of red blood cell size, and report evidence of increase of their size in crocodile-line archosaurs and decrease of their size in bird-line archosaurs.
- Evidence from the study of bone histology of extant Nile crocodiles, indicating that bones of extant and fossil archosaurs might have more growth marks than expected for their age as a result of growth in favorable conditions, is presented by Chinsamy & Pereyra (2025).
- Xu & Barrett (2025) review the research on the evolutionary history of feathers from the preceding years.
- New tetrapod fossil assemblage, including lagerpetid and early-diverging sauropodomorph fossil material, is described from the Carnian strata from the lower exposures of the Niemeyer Complex (Brazil) by Doering et al. (2025).
- A study on the biogeography of Triassic pterosaurs and lagerpetids is published by Foffa et al. (2025), who interpret their findings as indicating that lagerpetids tolerated a broader range of environmental conditions than pterosaurs, resulting in expansion of pterosaur distribution only after the climate became more humid following the Carnian pluvial episode.
- Evidence of similarities in brain anatomy of pterosaurs and non-avian members of Paraves is presented by Bronzati et al. (2025), who also report evidence from the study of the cranial endocast of Ixalerpeton polesinensis indicating that brain structure of pterosaurs was largely unprecedented in lagerpetids.
- Sena et al. (2025) measure metadiaphyseal and nutrient foramina openings in the femora of immature specimens of Halszkaraptor and Rhamphorhynchus, and calculate similar mass-independent maximal metabolic rates and blood flow rates for the studied archosaurs in spite of their different locomotion and ecology.
- Wang et al. (2025) describe new feather specimens from the Cretaceous amber from Myanmar, including a feather type with similarities to primitive feathers of non-avian theropods, preserved with melanosomes suggestive of a black color with a red luster, and a probable ornithothoracine (possibly enantiornithean) feather type preserved with melanosomes suggestive of a gray or black color.
- Zhang et al. (2025) study feathers from the Cretaceous amber from Myanmar with barb rami composed entirely of cortical tissue with no internal medulla, interpreted as suggestive of incomplete tissue differentiation in the early evolution of feathers, resulting in evolution of diverse morphotypes of early feathers with morphologies not seen in extant birds.
- Hedge et al. (2025) revise archosaur eggshells from the Mussentuchit Member of the Cedar Mountain Formation (Utah, United States), and identify remains of eggs produced by oviraptorosaur theropods, ornithopods and a crocodylomorph.
- Brown et al. (2025) describe a cervical vertebra of a juvenile specimen of Cryodrakon boreas from the Dinosaur Park Formation (Alberta, Canada), preserved with a bite mark interpreted as likely produced by a crocodilian.
- Cardia et al. (2025) study the feeding habits and trophic levels of vertebrates from the Upper Cretaceous Bauru Group (Brazil) on the basis of mercury concentration in their bones and tooth enamel, and interpret their findings as suggestive of herbivory in some sphagesaurids and of high trophic position of baurusuchids and abelisaurids.
- Hunt & Lucas (2025) describe regurgitalites from the Lower Cretaceous La Huérguina Formation in Spain (preserving bird bones and likely produced by a theropod or a pterosaur), from the Upper Jurassic Nusplingen Limestone in Germany (preserving pterosaur bones and likely produced by a crocodyliform) and from the Oligocene White River Formation in Wyoming, United States (preserving rodent bones and likely produced by an owl), and name new ichnotaxa Hoyasemeticus sanzi, Flugsaurierbromus schweigerti and Bubobromus kathyhuntae.
- Link et al. (2025) describe a tibiotarsus of a large phorusrhacid from the Miocene strata from La Venta (Colombia), preserved with four pits interpreted as feeding traces left by a medium-sized caiman (possibly Purussaurus neivensis).
- Cornille et al. (2025) present an assessment of bone pathologies in extant crocodilians, providing comparative data for interpretation of bone pathologies in fossil archosaurs.
