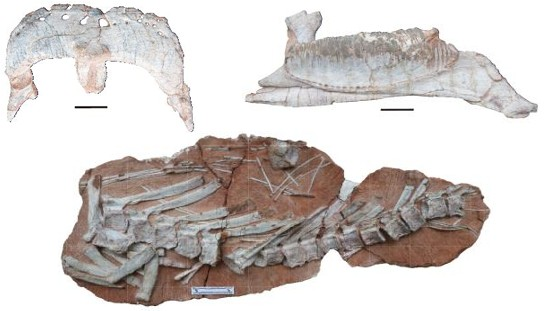
- Select elements of the Q. changshengi holotype: predentary (top left), dentary (top right), and tail vertebrae (bottom)

Scientific classification
- Kingdom: Animalia
- Phylum: Chordata
- Class: Reptilia
- Clade: Dinosauria
- Clade: †Ornithischia
- Clade: †Ornithopoda
- Clade: †Hadrosauriformes
- Superfamily: †Hadrosauroidea
- Genus: †Qianjiangsaurus; Dai et al., 2025
- Species: †Q. changshengi

Binomial name
- †Qianjiangsaurus changshengi Dai et al., 2025

= Qianjiangsaurus =

Qianjiangsaurus Temporal range: Late Cretaceous, ~84 Ma

Genus of ornithopod dinosaurs

Qianjiangsaurus (lit. 'Qianjiang lizard') is an extinct genus of hadrosauroid ornithopod dinosaurs from the Late Cretaceous Zhengyang Formation of China. The genus contains a single species, Qianjiangsaurus changshengi, named in 2025 based on a partial skeleton and lower jaw. In 2026, a partial isolated skull was described, indicating the species has a distinctive hollow crest on its snout. This is similar to the crests of some distantly related lambeosaurine hadrosaurs, but it evolved independently, making it the first ornithopod to bear such a structure outside of Lambeosaurinae. This crest may have been used to amplify its vocalizations, as in other crest-bearing hadrosaurs. Qianjiangsaurus is one of the few hadrosauroids named from south China, and it shows faunal connections between similarly aged formations in Mongolia.

== Discovery and naming ==
Q, changshengi type locality in Zhengyang, China

The Qianjiangsaurus holotype specimen, CLGRP V00016, was discovered by a paleontological expedition associated with the Chongqing Bureau of Geological and Mineral Resource Exploration and Development during the winter of 2022. The locality represents sediments of the Zhengyang Formation near Zhengyang area in Qianjiang District, Chongqing Municipality of southwest China. The specimen consists of a partial, somewhat articulated skeleton, comprising an incomplete mandible, four dorsal vertebrae, the sacrum, many caudal vertebrae and associated chevrons, most of the pelvic girdle, and several hindlimb bones.

After being announced in August 2024 in a non-finalized preprint, Dai et al. (2025) described Qianjiangsaurus changshengi as a new genus and species of hadrosauroid dinosaurs based on these fossil remains. The generic name, Qianjiangsaurus, combines "Qianjiang"—the name of the district containing the type locality—with the Greek σαῦρος (sauros), meaning 'lizard'. The specific name, changshengi, Changsheng Wang, the discoverer of the Chongqing fossil locality.

Nanningosaurus, a genus from the Nalong Basin of Guangxi, is the only other hadrosauroid currently named from southern China.

In the summer of 2024, a subsequent excavation was conducted at a new site in the Zhengyang area, about 1.5 kilometres (0.93 mi) north of the Q. changshengi type locality. A partial hadrosauroid skull, missing some of the facial bones and small parts of the lower jaw, was discovered here. The right half of the skull largely remains in articulation (still in anatomical position), while the left half is disarticulated. A braincase collected about 80 m (260 ft) southwest of the skull likely belongs to the same individual, as the articulation surfaces of the bones match perfectly. This new cranial material, accessioned as CIP V0002 at the Chongqing Institute of Paleontology, was described in 2026 by Qingyu Ma and colleagues. They recognized several features of the mandible of the new specimen comparable to the Q. changshengi holotype, allowing it to be referred to this species.

== Description ==
Size compared to a human

The holotype of Qianjiangsaurus likely represents a mature adult individual. It is medium-sized in comparison to related taxa, at about 8 metres (26 ft) long.

The prepubic process of the pubis is fan-shaped, with a length:height ratio of about 0.79, representing the single autapomorphy (unique derived trait) identified in the holotype. The unique combination of other characters includes a total of 30 dentary tooth positions with no more than five teeth per alveolus (tooth socket), a coronoid process at a right angle to the dentary, and seven fused vertebrae in the sacrum. While some of its plesiomorphic (ancestral) anatomical features confidently place it within the Hadrosauroidea, it still demonstrates apomorphic (derived) features of later-diverging members of the Hadrosauridae, placing it as a transitional form between the two groups.

The referred skull of Qianjiangosaurus belongs to a smaller individual, likely a subadult. This specimen has widened premaxillae, characteristic of the 'duck-billed' hadrosaurs. The external nares are similar in size to those of the later-diverging Prosaurolophus and Saurolophus. Most notably, this specimen preserves a helmet-like cranial crest mostly formed by the nasal bone. This crest has hollow internal cavities and is similar in structure to those of more derived hadrosaurs in the subfamily Lambeosaurinae. This is an example of convergent evolution, with Qianjiangsaurus and lambeosaurines likely capable of producing low-frequency vocalizations that were amplified by the chambers in the nasal.

== Classification ==
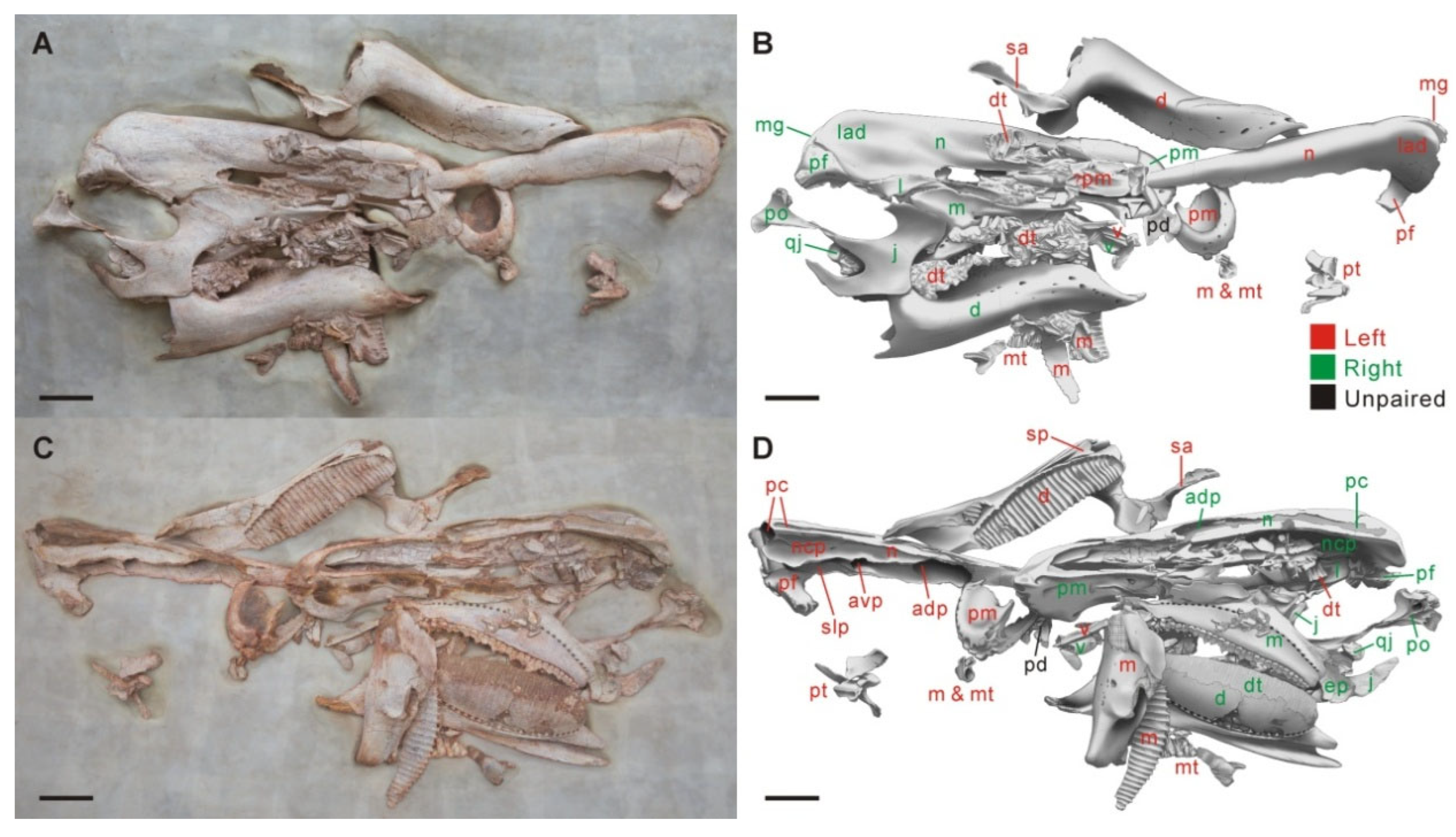
Q. changshengi referred skull, CIP V0002

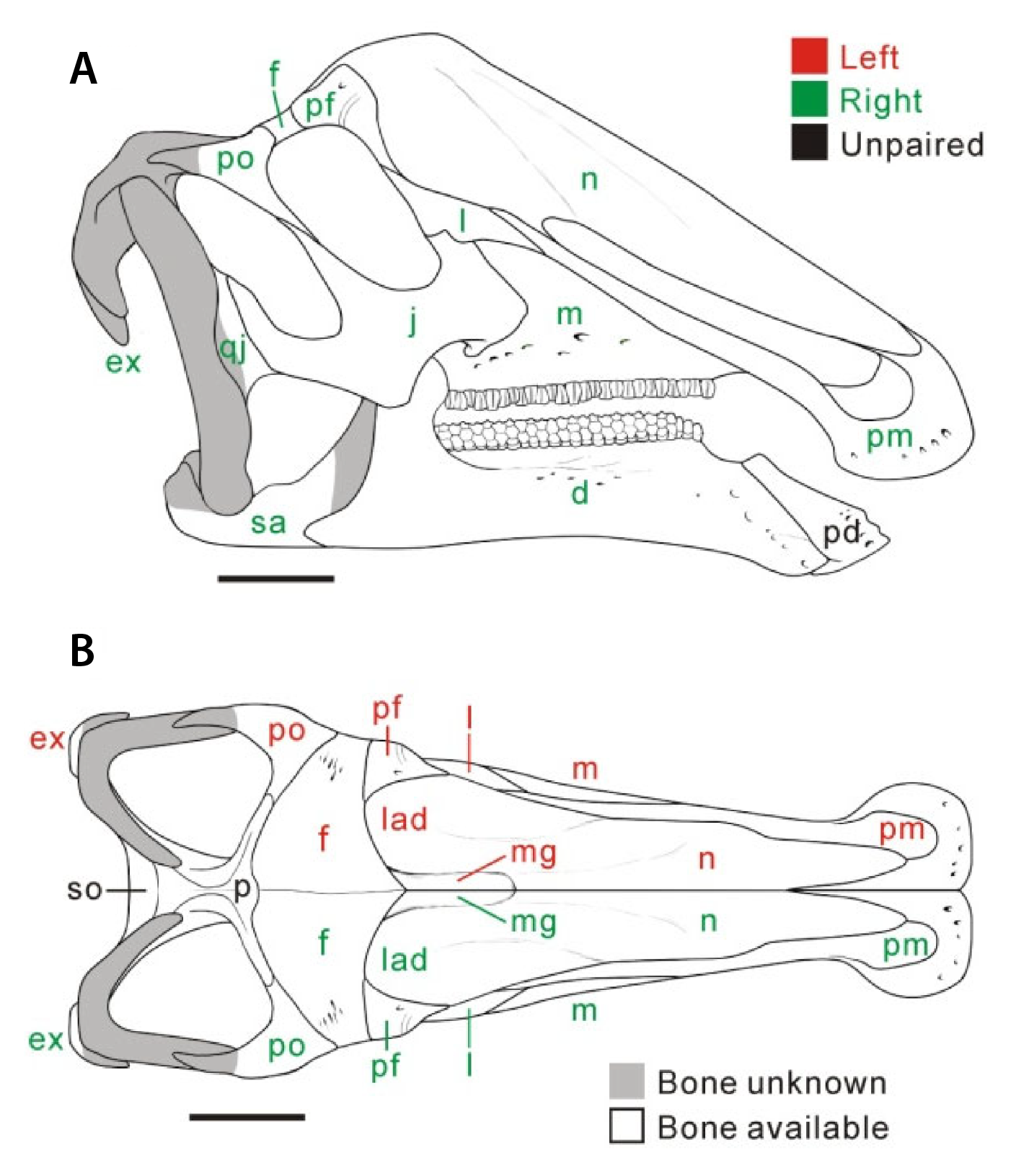
Reconstructed skull

To test the affinities and relationships of Qianjiangsaurus, Dai and colleagues included it in a version of the phylogenetic matrix of Xing et al. (2017). They recovered Qianjiangsaurus as the sister taxon to the Mongolian Plesiohadros, with these taxa as late-diverging members of the Hadrosauroidea outside of the Hadrosauridae. The researchers interpreted Qianjiangsaurus as supporting faunal similarities between the Zhengyang Formation of China and the Djadokhta and Baruungoyot formations of Mongolia. These dinosaur parallels would indicate a faunal interchange between the two regions during the end of the Late Cretaceous. A simplified version of their results are displayed in the cladogram below:

In their 2026 description of the second Qianjiangsaurus specimen, Ma and colleagues updated the character scores for Qianjiangsaurus in the matrix of Dai et al. (2025). The new anatomical observations resulted in an updated position for the taxon, slightly closer to Hadrosauridae and less close to Mongolian taxa. These results are summarized in the cladogram below:

Topology A: Results of Dai et al. (2025)

- - Earlier-diverging hadrosauroids
  - - Gobihadros
    - - Nanningosaurus
      - Claosaurus
      - - Plesiohadros
        - Qianjiangsaurus
      - - - Telmatosaurus
          - Tethyshadros
        - - Eotrachodon
          - - Zhanghenglong
            - Hadrosauridae
              - Hadrosaurus
              - Corythosauria
                - Lambeosaurinae
                - Saurolophinae

Topology B: Updated results of Ma et al. (2026)

- - Earlier-diverging hadrosauroids
  - - Gobihadros
    - - Claosaurus
      - - Plesiohadros
        - - - Telmatosaurus
            - Tethyshadros
          - - - Eotrachodon
              - Zhanghenglong
            - - Qianjiangsaurus
              - - Nanningosaurus
                - Hadrosauridae
                  - Hadrosaurus
                  - Corythosauria
                    - Lambeosaurinae
                    - Saurolophinae

== Paleoecology ==
Qianjiangsaurus is the first distinct dinosaur taxon to be named from the Zhengyang Formation. Fragmentary specimens belonging to unnamed titanosaurs and theropods (including tyrannosauroids and putative carnosaurs) have also been found. Since large-scale excavations had not occurred in the region until 2022, additional specimens—such as ornithomimosaurs, therizinosauroids, oviraptorosaurs as seen in coeval formations—may be found in the future.

== See also ==
- Timeline of hadrosaur research
- 2025 in archosaur paleontology
