= Zqueheanas =

Zqueheanas Temporal range: Late Miocene

Scientific classification
- Kingdom: Animalia
- Phylum: Chordata
- Class: Aves
- Order: Anseriformes
- Family: Anatidae
- Genus: †Zqueheanas
- Species: †Z. hebe

Binomial name
- †Zqueheanas hebe Agnolín et al., 2025

Extinct species of duck

Zqueheanas is an extinct genus of tadornine duck that lived in South America during the Late Miocene.

== Distribution ==
Zqueheanas hebe is known from the Las Flores Formation located in the Calingasta Valley of Argentina, which dates to the Huayquerian South American land mammal age.
