= Gracanicanetta =

Gracanicanetta Temporal range: Miocene

Scientific classification
- Kingdom: Animalia
- Phylum: Chordata
- Class: Aves
- Order: Anseriformes
- Family: Anatidae
- Genus: †Gracanicanetta; Bochenski, Happ, Salwa & Tomek, 2025
- Species: †G. happi

Binomial name
- †Gracanicanetta happi Bochenski, Happ, Salwa & Tomek, 2025

Extinct genus of duck

Gracanicanetta is a genus of extinct duck that lived on in Bosnia and Herzegovina during the middle Miocene epoch. It currently contains only one species which is Gracanicanetta happi. It lived in swamp environments and was probably a diving duck. It has the record of being the first documented fossil of a duck with gastroliths. Theses appear as smooth stones in clusters of around a dozen in the approximate location of the gizzard.

== Etymology ==
It was named after Gračanica where the specimen was found. "Netta" means duck in Greek. "Happi" is in reference to Helga and Friedrich Happ who are herpetologists and donors of the fossil.
