= Australarus =

Australarus Temporal range: Early Miocene

Scientific classification
- Kingdom: Animalia
- Phylum: Chordata
- Class: Aves
- Order: Charadriiformes
- Family: Laridae
- Genus: †Australarus; De Pietri et al., 2025
- Species: †A. bakeri

Binomial name
- †Australarus bakeri De Pietri et al., 2025

Extinct genus of birds

Australarus (south gull) is a genus of extinct gull like bird that lived in New Zealand in the early Miocene. It currently only contains one species: Australarus bakeri.

== Discovery and naming ==
The holotype was first collected on 17 March 2019 in the Bannockburn formation in St Bathans, consisting only of the right humerus. More remains were found in Malta Creek, and Croc Site 1 which included coracoids and quadrates. Some tentative material has also been assigned to this taxon, including a sternum.

The generic name combines the Latin word for south being austral and gull being larus, and the specific name is named in honour of Allan J Baker, a New Zealand ornithologist who studied the evolution of seabirds.

== Description ==
Australarus is a small species, being comparable to the least tern. It also lacks pneumatic holes (air holes) in the coracoid and humerus bones, suggesting it relied less on flight. Other diagnostic traits include the processus acrocoracoideus bulging on the ventral (lower) side of the coracoid, and an elongated crista deltopectoralis which both could suggest a stronger attachment with muscles.

== Classification ==
Australarus was found to be in the family of Laridae thanks to features such as a developed fossa pneumotricipitalis. Probable plesiomorphic (ancestral traits) and differences in modern members also seem to indicate that Australarus would have diverged early in Laridae.

== Paleobiology ==
Some of the recovered specimens have striated lines, which may indicate the presence of immature individuals.

== Paleoecology ==
Australarus was found in St Bathans, specifically in the Bannockburn formation, which was once a giant shallow freshwater lake. It would have lived with various other species like Proapteryx, and Cnemiornis catirae. Like most members in its family, it probably fed on small fish and aquatic invertebrates. It is also likely that Australarus bred there, with evidence of juvenile individuals.
