= Wakkaoolithus =

Wakkaoolithus Temporal range: Eocene

Egg fossil classification
- Basic shell type: †Crocodiloid
- Oogenus: †Wakkaoolithus; Panadès i Blas et al., 2025

Oospecies
- †W. godthelpii Panadès i Blas et al., 2025 (type)

Oogenus of Mekosuchid

Wakkaoolithus is a genus of fossil crocodile eggshell fragments found in Australia. The type species, Wakkaoolithus godthelpi, is the oldest known crocodile eggshell discovered in Australia, dating back 55 million years to the Eocene epoch.
