= Aeviperditus =

Scientific classification
- Kingdom: Animalia
- Phylum: Chordata
- Class: Aves
- Order: Passeriformes
- Family: Ptilonorhynchidae
- Genus: Aeviperditus

Binomial name
- Aeviperditus gracilis Steell et al. 2025

Extinct genus of passerine bird

Aeviperditus is an extinct genus of passerine bird that possibly belongs to the family Ptilonorhychidae (bowerbirds). It lived in New Zealand during the early-middle Miocene epoch.

== Discovery ==
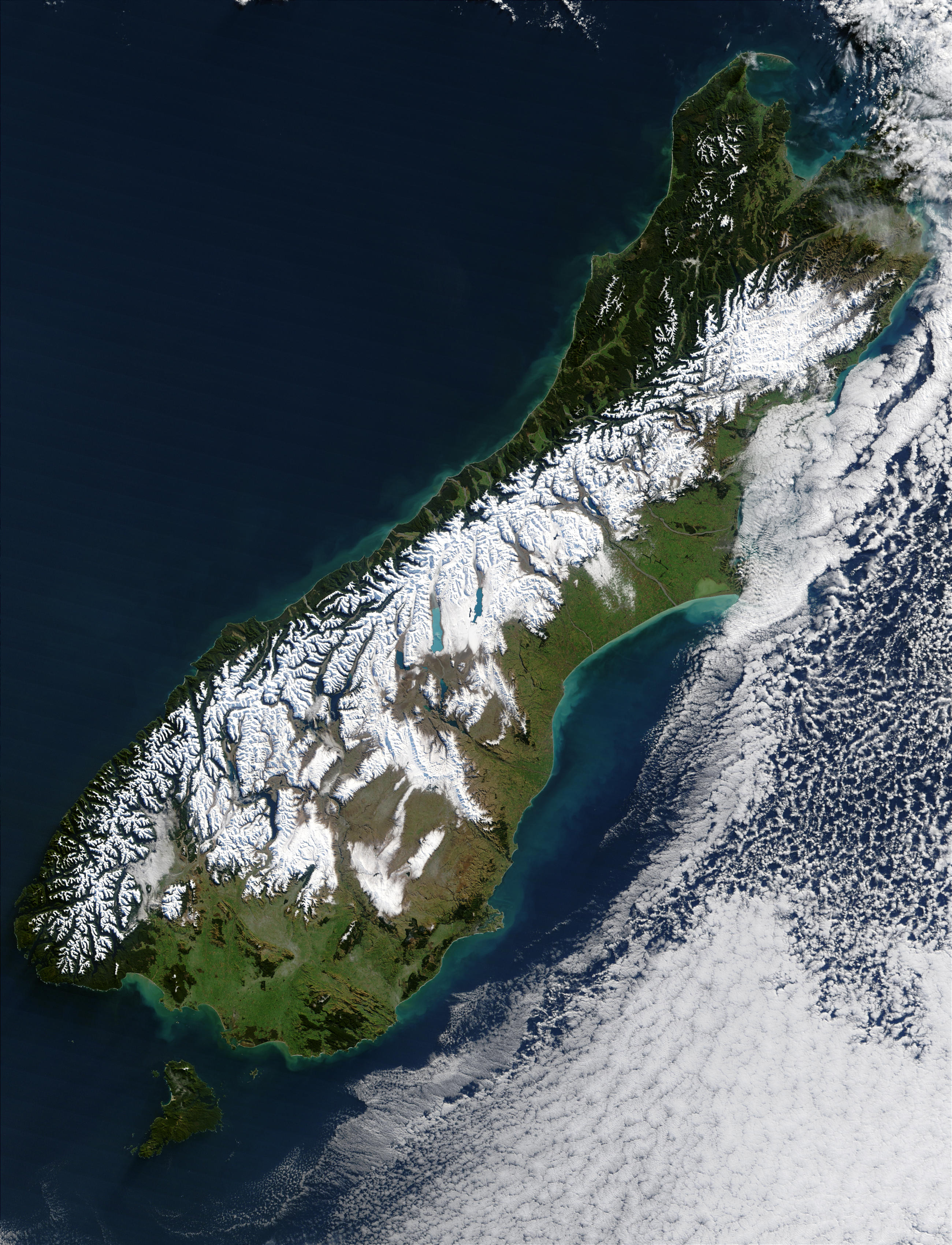
Aeviperditus inhabited the South Island, likely during the early-middle Miocene epoch.

The fossil material was discovered in 2005 in Central Otago on the Southern Island of New Zealand in the Bannockburn Formation. The material was then described in 2025 by (Steell et al. 2025). The layer it was discovered in has a poorly constrained age. Bases on palynological evidence, the fossil layer is of early Miocene age dating to around 16-19 million years old. More descent studied on this layer have proposed it to be slightly younger at 18.7–15.1 million years old. It seems that this layer at the youngest is of middle Miocene age based on palynological evidence.

The holotype specimen, NMNZ S.44264, consists of an isolated distal left tarsometatarsus with most of the shaft preserved. The fossils are three-dimensionality preserved however some of the material, specifically the edges of the trochleae, are slightly worn however they appear to retain their original shape.

=== Etymology ===
The genus name Aeviperditus is derived from the Latin word aevum meaning 'age' and perditus meaning 'lost'. The genus name is in reference to the disputed age of the fossil layer it was found in and how it seems to represent an unknown lineage of New Zealand passerines. The species name gracilis is derived from the Latin word slender or graceful. The species name is in reference to the gracile build of this species.

== Phylogeny ==
This genus exhibits several derived features that are similar to passerine birds of the family Ptilonorhychidae (bowerbirds). It has therefore has been tentatively placed as a member of total-group Ptilonorhynchidae. It seems that Aeviperditus was most comparable to the 'avenue builder' subclade of crown Ptilonorhynchidae. However no living or extinct species of Bowerbirds exhibits the diminutiveness and elongate proportions this genus possesses. This means that Aeviperditus may be a stem ptilonorhynchid.

=== Evolution ===
It appears that Aeviperditus represents an unknown lineage of passerine birds from New Zealand. Bowerbirds are currently only known to inhabit Australia and New Guinea. The discovery of Aeviperditus expands the prehistoric geographic distribution of bowerbirds.

It is proposed that cooling of the climate during the Miocene possibly lead to the extinction of this genus.
