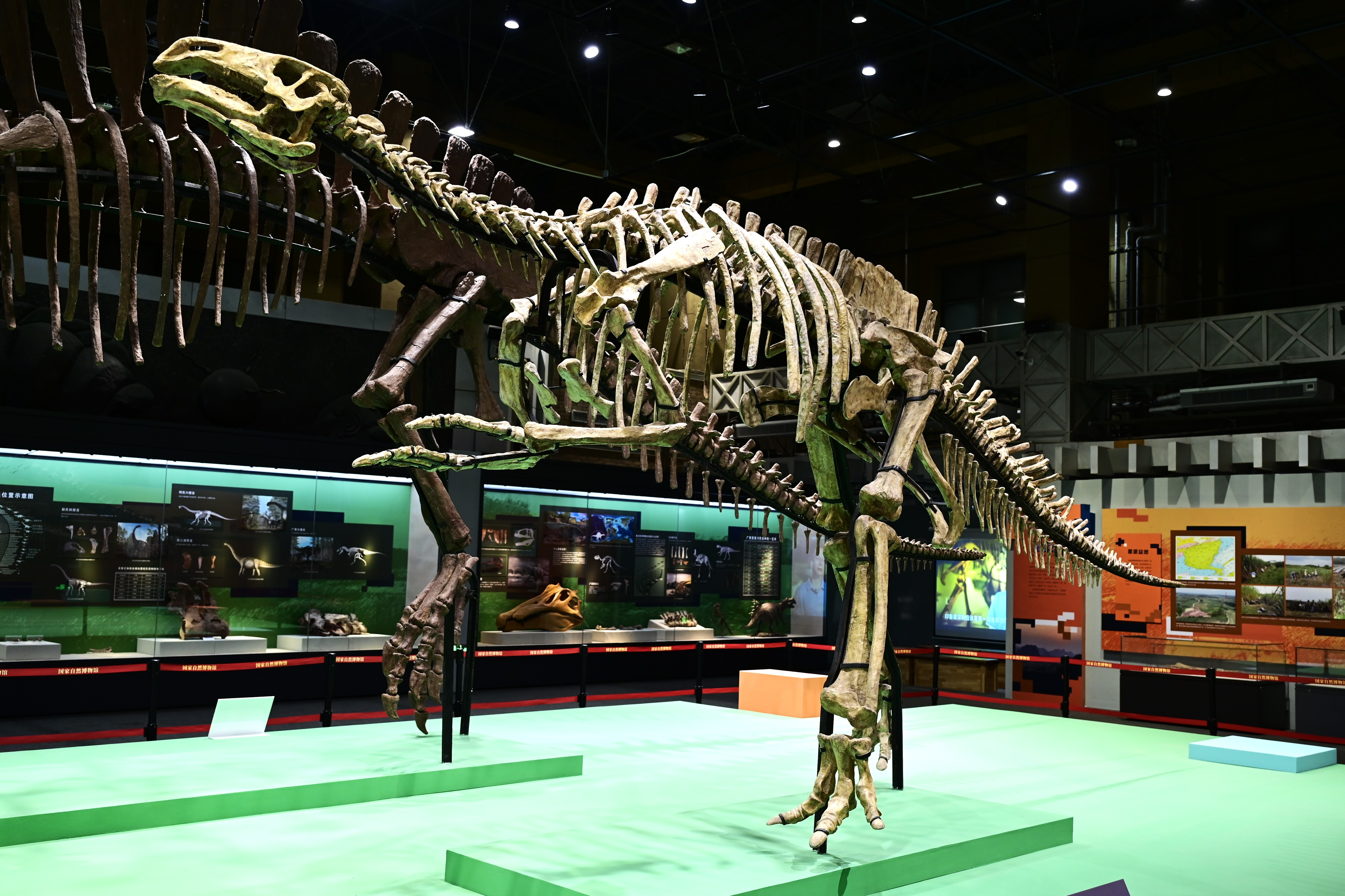
- Skeletal cast, National Natural History Museum of China

Scientific classification
- Kingdom: Animalia
- Phylum: Chordata
- Clade: Dinosauria
- Clade: †Ornithischia
- Clade: †Ornithopoda
- Clade: †Hadrosauromorpha
- Genus: †Nanningosaurus; Mo et al., 2007

Type species
- Nanningosaurus dashiensis Mo et al., 2007

= Nanningosaurus =

Nanningosaurus Temporal range: Late Cretaceous, 72.1–66 Ma

Extinct genus of dinosaurs

Nanningosaurus is a genus of hadrosauromorph dinosaur from the upper Late Cretaceous of the Nalong Basin, Guangxi, China.

The type and only species is Nanningosaurus dashiensis, named and described by Mo Jinyou, Zhao Zhongru, Wamg Wei, and Xu Xing in 2007. The generic name refers to the city of Nanning, located close to the excavation site. The specific name is derived from the Pinyin da-shi ("great stone"), the name of the village where the discovery was made.

Nanningosaurus is based on the holotype, NHMG8142, an incomplete skeleton including skull, arm, leg, and pelvis remains found in 1991, together with the holotype of Qingxiusaurus. The discoveries were in 1998 reported in the scientific literature. The paratype is NHJM8143, a right maxilla.

In 2010, Gregory S. Paul estimated the body length of Nanningosaurus at 7.5 metres (25 ft) and its weight at 2.5 tonnes (2.5 long tons; 2.8 short tons). No autapomorphies were given but a unique combination of diagnostic characteristics includes a high and sharp ascending branch of the maxilla, a short rear branch of the maxilla, relatively few tooth positions (twenty-seven in the maxilla), a transversely wide lower quadrate with a weak paraquadratic notch, a gracile upper arm, and an ischium that at the lower end of its rear edge curves towards its expanded tip.

Mo et al. (2007), who described the specimen, performed a phylogenetic analysis that suggests Nanningosaurus was a basal lambeosaurine, although they stressed the support for this was tentative. This animal was the first hadrosauroid named from southern China.

== See also ==
- Timeline of hadrosaur research
