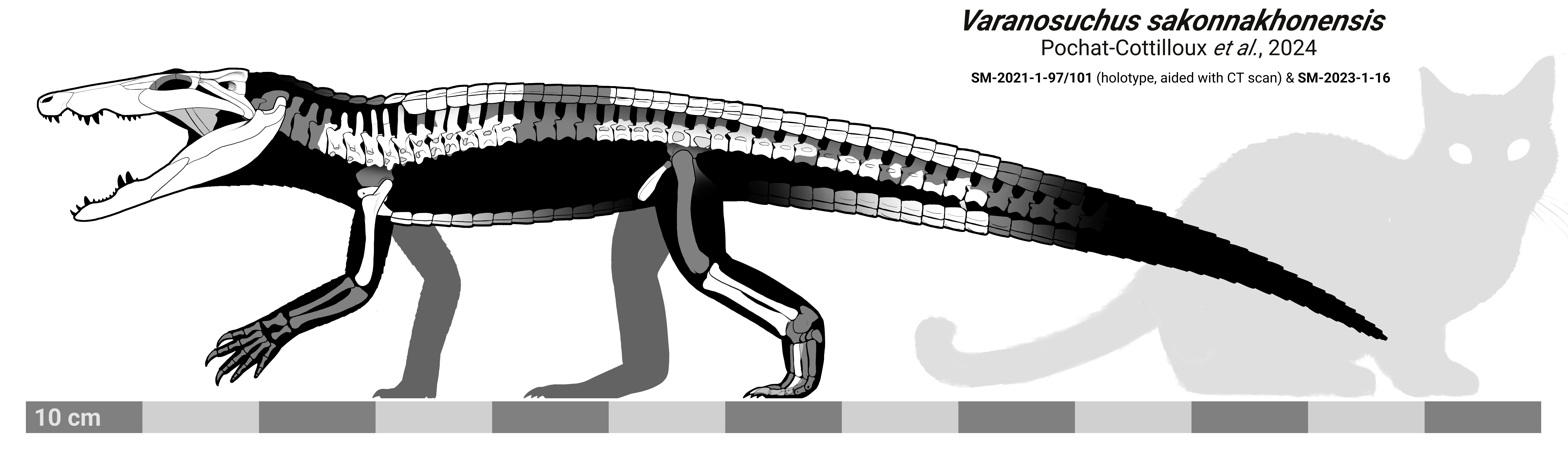
- Skeletal reconstruction showcasing the known elements in white
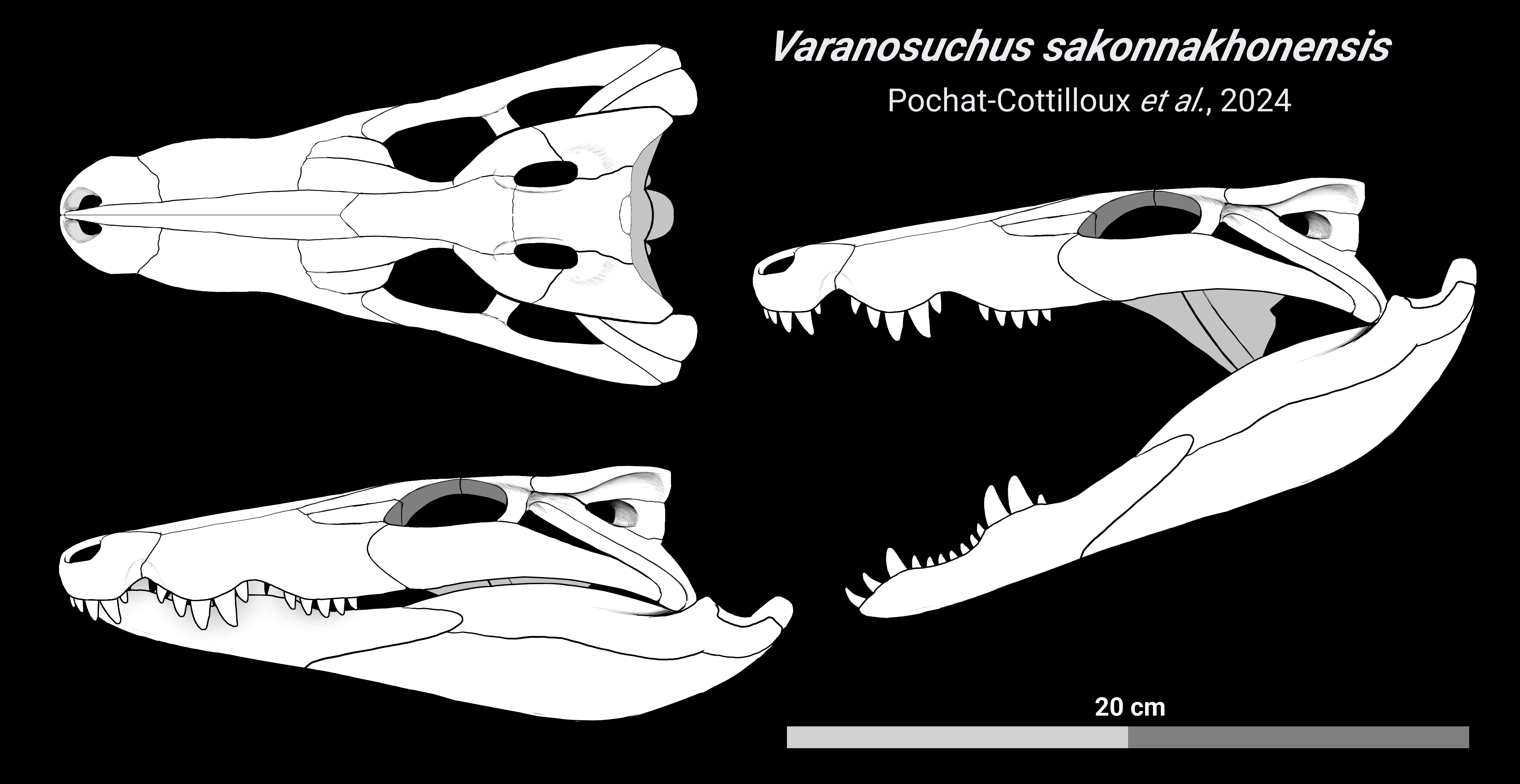
- Skull diagram

Scientific classification
- Kingdom: Animalia
- Phylum: Chordata
- Class: Reptilia
- Clade: Archosauria
- Clade: Pseudosuchia
- Clade: Crocodylomorpha
- Family: †Atoposauridae
- Genus: †Varanosuchus; Pochat-Cottilloux et al., 2024

Type species
- †Varanosuchus sakonnakhonensis Pochat-Cottilloux et al., 2024

= Varanosuchus =

Varanosuchus Temporal range: Early Cretaceous, early Valanginian–early Hauterivian

Extinct genus of atoposaurid neosuchian

Varanosuchus is an extinct genus of atoposaurid neosuchian from the Early Cretaceous Sao Khua Formation of Thailand. Varanosuchus is known from three individuals which preserve assorted postcranial material and a complete skull. The skull of Varanosuchus was altirostral, meaning it wasn't flattened like in modern crocodilians and instead much deeper, while the limbs were slender and straight, leading to it somewhat resembling a monitor lizard. Little is known about the ecology of atoposaurids, however, based on the slender, erect limbs, the altirostral skull and the well ornamented osteoderms it has been suggested that Varanosuchus was a terrestrial animal with some semi-aquatic affinities. Only a single species is recognized, Varanosuchus sakonnakhonensis.

== History and naming ==
Varanosuchus was described in 2024 on the basis of three specimens found in 2018 within Early Cretaceous (Valanginian to Hauterivian) sediments of the Sao Khua Formation in Thailand near the district of Mueang Sakon Nakhon. The specimens more specifically stem from the Phu Sung locality, which preserves silty mudstone of continental origins. The holotype, SM-2021-1-97/101, consists of an almost complete, three dimensionally preserved skull alongside most of the body, only missing the shoulder girdle, forelimbs and parts of the hindlimbs. In addition to the type specimen, two more individuals are known to science. SM-2023-1-16 is a second three-dimensionally preserved skull while SM-2023-1-17 preserves only the skull table.

The genus name was chosen due to the animals resemblance to today's monitor lizards of the genus Varanus. The species on the other hand refers to the Sakon Nakhon Province, where the material was collected.

== Description ==
Overall Varanosuchus is described as having been altirostral, meaning its skull was deep and not flattened as those seen in modern crocodilians and some other neosuchians like goniopholidids. In addition to being deep, the rostrum itself was furthermore relatively short, occupying only around half the length of the entire skull, the final third of which having been formed by the skull table. These two things combined already differentiate Varanosuchus from the majority of crocodylomorphs recognized from the Cretaceous of Thailand, namely the large longirostrine pholidosaurid Chalawan, the poorly understood Ban Saphan Hin eusuchian, Siamosuchus and Khoratosuchus.

The nares are enclosed almost entirely by the premaxillae, with only the hind-most section being formed by the paired nasal bones. The contact between the premaxilla and the maxilla is straight when looking at the skull from above or below, but oblique from the side with the upper margin being located behind the lower margin. Five tooth sockets are situated in either premaxilla, the largest of which being the third and fourth before decreasing in size again for the fifth. Behind this last tooth socket and preceding the maxillary toothrow is a prominent notch that accommodate a large dentary tooth when the jaws are closed, something also seen in a great number of other extinct and extant crocodylomorphs. The maxillae are festooned, forming two large waves that the teeth emerge from. These waves reach their greatest height at the level of the fourth and the ninth alveoli of the maxillary toothrow. It is thought that Varanosuchus had a minimum of ten teeth in either side, the largest of which being the third and fourth which are situated on the first wave. Like the premaxilla, the fifth shows a sudden decrease in size and precedes a gap in the dentition that also accommodates one of the dentary teeth. The back of the maxilla has a marked depression. The nasals stretch across most of the rostrum, from the back of the nares to the anterior process of the frontal bone, where the latter extends into the nasal through a V-shaped suture. The nasals are straight throughout their length, which helps differentiate Varanosuchus from the other altirostral crocodylomorph of Cretaceous Thailand, Theriosuchus grandinaris. In addition to contact the premaxillae, maxillae and frontal, the nasals also come in contact with the prefrontals. Contact with the lacrimals however varies, with the holotype showing the bones to be entirely separated whereas in the referred specimens they actually touch another. Unlike today's crocodiles, at least some individuals of Varanosuchus possessed an antorbital fenestrae, an additional hole in the skull situated before the eyes where the maxilla meets the lacrimal and the jugal bone. The jugal continues back and forms the lower margin of the orbits, bearing a crest and a depression on its outer surface. The jugal extends nearly to the end of the cranium where it contacts the quadratojugal, nearly forming part of the lower jaw articulation. The quadratojugal is a slim element squeezed in between the jugal and the quadrate and bears no ornamentation. No fenestrae are present on the quadrate. The D-shaped eye sockets of Varanosuchus were large, approximately half as long as the skull table.

The skull table, consisting of the frontal, postorbitals, squamosals and the parietal bone, is covered in a series of pitted ornamentations. These four bones also form the borders of the supratemporal fenestrae, two large, ovoid holes in the top of the skull table. The openings are around the same length as the parietal and are noted to have had steep vertical walls in the type specimen, which obscures the frontoparietal fossa. However, the referred specimens indicate that even if visible, it would likely not be very wide. Among the bones of the skull table, the postorbitals and squamosals are especially highlighted in the type description of Varanosuchus, with Pochat-Cottiloux and colleagues describing the former as facing anterolaterally, meaning forward and to the sides, where it connects to the jugal. The squamosals meanwhile are the opposite, facing dorsolaterally (back and to the sides). The squamosal contacts the quadrate in front of the opening of the ear canal.

The choanae of the holotype specimen are entirely surrounded by the pterygoid bones, but the referred specimen SM-2023-1-16 seems to suggest that the palatines could have contributed to the edge of these openings in some individuals. This is however only poorly supported, as the palatal region of the referred specimen is poorly preserved and thus not adequate to confirm that the palatines participated in the choanae. This is significant, as previously choanae fully enclosed by the pterygoids were considered to be a defining characteristic of eusuchians. Given that Varanosuchus is the only atoposaurid to display this anatomy, its argued by Pochat-Cottiloux and colleagues that this feature was developed independently at least thrice among neosuchians, in Varanosuchus, hylaeochampsids and crocodilians.

The lower jaw contained thirteen teeth, all of which were situated in the dentary bone. The two dentaries that form the lower jaw connect at the position of the fifth tooth in the lower jaw, forming the mandibular symphysis that formed the tip of the mandible. The symphysis was comparably wide which, combined with the rather uniformly wide mandibular rami, gives the lower jaw roughly the shape of a U. Like with the maxilla, the dentary has a sinuous silhouette when viewed from the side, with prominent waves that the teeth were placed atop of, fitting neatly into the concave areas of the upper jaw. The first of these peaks with the third and fourth dentary teeth while the second peaks with the eleventh and twelfth. These teeth, with the exception of the fourth, are also the biggest in the lower jaw, with the third in particular being the reason for the large notch present between the premaxilla and maxilla. Unlike modern crocodiles, Varanosuchus did not have an external mandibular fenestra, a hole that would otherwise perforate the outer surface of the lower jaw. Like the upper jaw, the surface of the lower jaw was ornamented by a series of pits and grooves, the former of which being circular to ovoid in shape.

Several teeth of Varanosuchus are known, with Pochat-Cottiloux and colleagues noting at least two different tooth morphotypes being present in this genus. The first of these morphotypes is represented by large conical caniniform teeth (corresponding to the "pseudocaniniform" morphotype described by some previous authors) with an ovoid cross section and some curvature to their shape. In the referred skull these caniniforms preserve cutting edges, so-called carinae, but no crenulations or even serrations, meaning these teeth were not ziphodont and more importantly distinct from those of Theriosuchus grandinaris. What was present however where thin vertical ridges, striations, that were formed by the tooth enamel. The lower form also preserves teeth of this morphology as well as "lanceolote-shaped" teeth. It is noted that the front most teeth are procumbent, meaning they are positioned to face more towards the front of the jaw, which once again differs from what is observed in the Thai species of Theriosuchus.

The limb bones of Varanosuchus, which include the humerus, tibia and fibula, were notably long and slender, showing little twisting or curving, which suggests that this animal adopted a more erect gait in life, holding its limbs parallel to the spine rather than sprawling. The head of the humerus stands out as it is quite different from what is seen in other crocodyliforms, being well developed and extending posterolaterally, back and towards the side.

Like most crocodylomorphs, Varanosuchus was covered in extensive armour formed by a multitude of small bony plates, known as osteoderms. Due to the state of the fossil, at least two major "shields" can be distinguished, the dorsal shield, meaning the armour that covered the top of the body, and the ventral shield, which protected the animal's belly. The dorsal shield is known from at least three rows, which would suggest that Varanosuchus most likely either had four rows of paravertebral osteoderms or two rows each of paravertebral and lateral osteoderms, seeing as no crocodylomorph is known to have possessed an uneven number of osteoderm rows. Regardless, the dorsal shield consisted of osteoderms that were notably wider than long, generally flat or only slightly arched, sometimes adorned by keels and always covered in pits like the skull. Some preserve spines that would help in articulating the osteoderm to its predecessor, which overlies the one behind it. The ventral shield is less well preserved, but complete enough to show that it consisted of a multitude of small, square osteoderms that are organized in at least two rows and ornamented much like those of the dorsal shield.

== Phylogeny ==
Varanosuchus is thought to be an important animal to the understanding of the internal relationship of various neosuchian groups, which have been historically in flux. Varanosuchus was placed in the family Atoposauridae based on a variety of characters including the broad, altirostral snout, the small antorbital fenestra, the shape and organisation of its teeth and the anatomy of the osteoderms. The resulting phylogenetic tree recovered both Atoposauridae and Paralligatoridae as monophyletic clades and further sister groups to one another, with Hylaeochampsidae and Bernissartia appearing to have been more closely related to them than to today's crocodilians. Within Atoposauridae Varanosuchus nested together with Aprosuchus from the Late Cretaceous of Romania. However, the internal relationships in the family are poorly resolved, resulting in a large polytomy.

- - †Isisfordia
  - - †Susisuchus
    - - †Pholidosauridae + †Dyrosauridae
      - - †Paluxysuchus
        - - †Goniopholididae
          - Eusuchia
            - - †Hylaeochampsidae
              - - †Bernissartia
                - - †Atoposauridae
                    - †Sabresuchus
                    - - †Alligatorium
                      - †Theriosuchus
                    - †Knoetschkesuchus
                    - - †Aprosuchus
                      - †Varanosuchus
                  - †Paralligatoridae
            - Crocodilia

== Paleobiology ==
While the ecology of atoposaurids is rather poorly understood, recent studies have come to suggest that members of this group were largely terrestrial. This has been used as an explanation for the family's poor fossil record and the fact that the opening of the nares are directed forward rather than upward as in semi-aquatic crocodylomorphs. The deep, altirostral skull and raised posture of Varanosuchus specifically also support this notion, being commonly linked to terrestrial habits as this morphology impacts the position of the nostrils and allows for binocular vision. Pochat-Cottiloux and colleagues further argue that this could be supported by more precise study of the neuroanatomy of these animals. In addition to the shape of the skull, the anatomy of the osteoderms may also give clues to the animal's ecology and habits. In a 2023 paper Pochat-Cottiloux suggest that the ornamentation of the osteoderms is directly linked to their thermoregulatory function. The more ornamented an osteoderm the better it is suited for absorbing heat, which in turn is more important for semi-aquatic taxa and thus selected for in groups with said lifestyle. In this regard the osteoderms of Varanosuchus could suggest that the animal had some semi-aquatic affinities, as like other atoposaurids it had ornamented osteoderms. The final part of the anatomy discussed in the type description of Varanosuchus in relation to its ecology concerns the limbs. The elongated and straight limbs of Varanosuchus would be suited for life on land as they give the animal an erect posture with the limbs being oriented parallel to the spine. However, the authors note that the morphology of the humerus, based on its width to length ration, falls in-between the "gracile build" often associated with terrestrial forms and the "robust build" seen in semi-aquatic and aquatic taxa. While all these results together appear contradictory, the team highlights that a terrestrial lifestyle can be nonetheless accompanied with some adaptations for semi-aquatic habits, as seen in some modern lizards. Subsequently, they tentatively support the idea of Varanosuchus spending time both on land and in the water.
