= Aprosuchus =

Aprosuchus Temporal range: Maastrichtian

Scientific classification
- Domain: Eukaryota
- Kingdom: Animalia
- Phylum: Chordata
- Class: Reptilia
- Clade: Archosauria
- Clade: Pseudosuchia
- Clade: Crocodylomorpha
- Family: †Atoposauridae
- Genus: †Aprosuchus; Venczel and Codrea, 2019

Type species
- †Aprosuchus ghirai Venczel and Codrea, 2019

Extinct genus of reptiles

Aprosuchus is a genus of small-bodied Maastrichtian atoposaurid Eusuchian from the Hateg Basin, Romania.

== Discovery and naming ==
Aprosuchus is known from an incomplete three-dimensional skull and closely associated mandibles (Holotype UBB V.562/1) as well as a cervical vertebrae found in association with the cranial remains (referred specimen UBB V.562/2). The fossils were found in Maastrichtian sediments of the Pui Gater locality in the Hateg Basin in modern day Transylvania, Romania.

The name derives from the Hungarian "apró" meaning small and the Ancient Greek σοῦχος, soukhos ("crocodile"). The species name ghirai honors Ioan Ghira from the Babeș-Bolyai University, Cluj-Napoca, for his contributions to Herpetology.

== Description ==
Aprosuchus was a small sized brevirostrine Eusuchian with an estimated body length of 600 mm. It differs from other crocodylomorphs through large palpebral strongly fused to the orbital margin of the prefrontals and frontals and partly overlapping the prefrontal and lacrimal and heterodont dentition. Aprosuchus dentition preserves at least four different morphotypes, pseudocaniniforms, pseudoziphodont lanceolate, ziphodont lanceolate and ‘low-crowned’ teeth. A further autapomorphy is the w-shaped overlap between the nasals and prefrontals which differentiates Aprosuchus from Sabresuchus symplesiodon. The presence of four different tooth morphotypes casts doubt over the identification of atoposaurids based on teeth beyond a family level.

== Phylogeny ==
The following phylogenetic tree is based on the results of Venczel and Codrea 2019 using their strict consensus tree resulted from the four most parsimonious trees (Alligatorium excluded). They recovered that Aprosuchus ghirai appeared to be closely allied to other atoposaurids while Wannchampsus and the Glen Rose Form stood outside of the clade, but still closer to atoposaurids than to paralligatorids.

- - - "Glen Rose" Form
    - Wannchampsus kirpachi
  - - Atoposauridae
      - Aprosuchus ghirai
      - Theriosuchus pusillus
      - - Sabresuchus symplesiodon
        - - Knoetschkesuchus langenbergensis
          - Knoetschkesuchus guimarotae

The paper's strict consensus tree resulted from the two most parsimonious trees (Alligatorium included) recovered similar results, retaining the sister group relationship between the Wannchampsus + Glen Rose Form clade as well as the sister group relationship between atoposaurids and paralligatorids.

- - - "Glen Rose" Form
    - Wannchampsus kirpachi
  - - Atoposauridae
      - Aprosuchus ghirai
      - Sabresuchus symplesiodon
      - - - Alligatorium
          - Theriosuchus pusillus
        - - Knoetschkesuchus langenbergensis
          - Knoetschkesuchus guimarotae

== Paleobiology ==
The presence of the fossil remains of two distinct genera of atoposaurids, alongside tentatively referred isolated teeth of the possibly durophagous Eusuchian Acynodon (cf. Acynodon sp.) and the larger Allodaposuchus implies the existence of a diverse and complex ecosystem present on the Transylvanian landmass during the Maastrichtian. In this ecosystem the small bodied Aprosuchus would have most likely preyed on invertebrates and small vertebrates.

The presence of Aprosuchus suggests that survivors of the Late Jurassic/Early Cretaceous atoposaurid lineage managed to survive up to the Late Cretaceous by colonising complex island ecosystems in the archipelagos of the Eastern Tethys.
