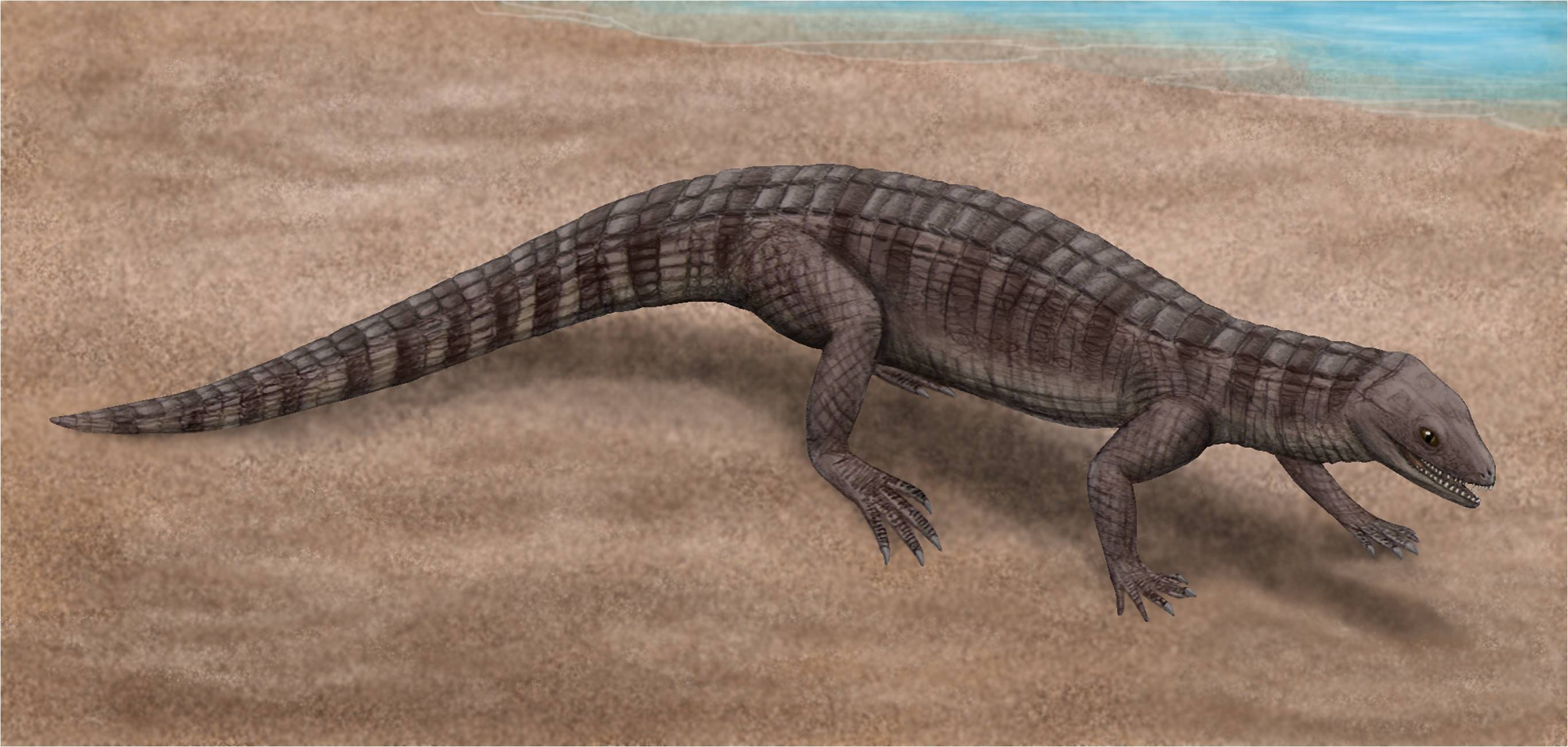
- Life restoration

Scientific classification
- Kingdom: Animalia
- Phylum: Chordata
- Class: Reptilia
- Clade: Pseudosuchia
- Clade: Crocodylomorpha
- Family: †Atoposauridae
- Genus: †Montsecosuchus; Buscalioni and Sanz, 1990

Type species
- †Montsecosuchus depereti (Vidal, 1915 [originally Alligatorium])

= Montsecosuchus =

Montsecosuchus Temporal range: Early Cretaceous

Extinct genus of reptiles

Montsecosuchus is an extinct genus of atoposaurid crocodylomorphs. It is the replacement generic name for Alligatorium depereti, which was described in 1915 from the Montsec Lithographic Limestone quarry of Spain. Fossils found from this locality are from the Early Cretaceous, being Upper Berriasian-Lower Valanginian in age, belonging to the La Pedrera de Rúbies Formation While many publications concerning atoposaurids after 1915 have included mentions of A. depereti, none has offered a redescription or revision of the species, though some recognized that great differences existed between it and other members of the genus. In these publications, the skull of A. depereti was shorter in relation to body length than any other species of Alligatorium (being less than half of the presacral length), and this may have been evidence for the genetic distinction of the species, although no replacement name was proposed. However, better preparation of the holotype specimen MGB 512, a nearly complete articulated skeleton embedded in a limestone matrix now housed in the Museu de Ciències Naturals de Barcelona, allowed for a revision of the species in 1990 in which the name Montsecosuchus was first used.

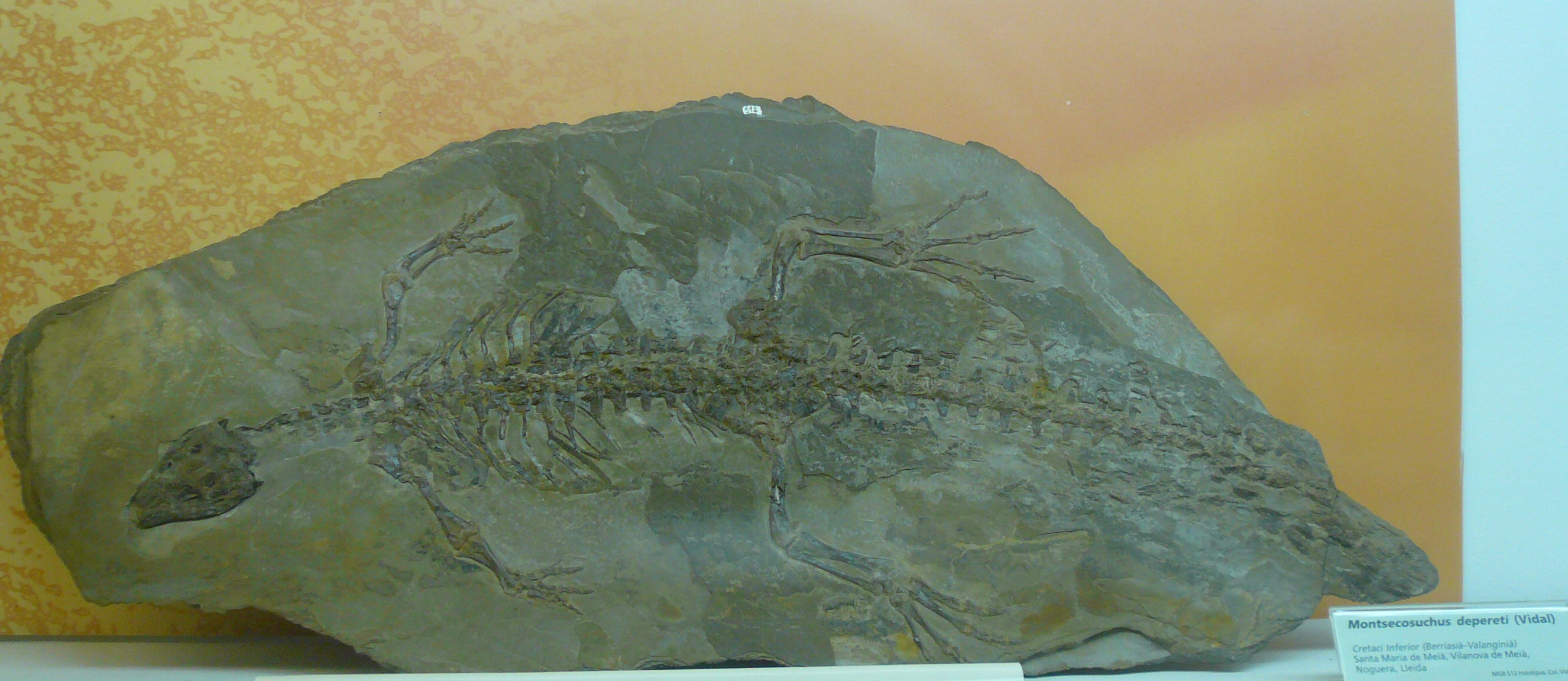
Holotype of Montsecosuchus

Montsecosuchus differs in several ways from other atoposaurids such as Alligatorium, Alligatorellus, and Theriosuchus. Several characteristics of the skull including the presence of an ungrooved parietal-squamosal suture and a caudally projecting retroarticular process distinguish Montsecosuchus from these genera. Both Montsecosuchus and Alligatorellus possess three sacral vertebrae; this may be a shared synapomorphy of the two genera. The shortness of the radius is an autapomorphy of the genus that is not seen in any other atoposaurid, although it is common in more derived crocodylomorphs.
