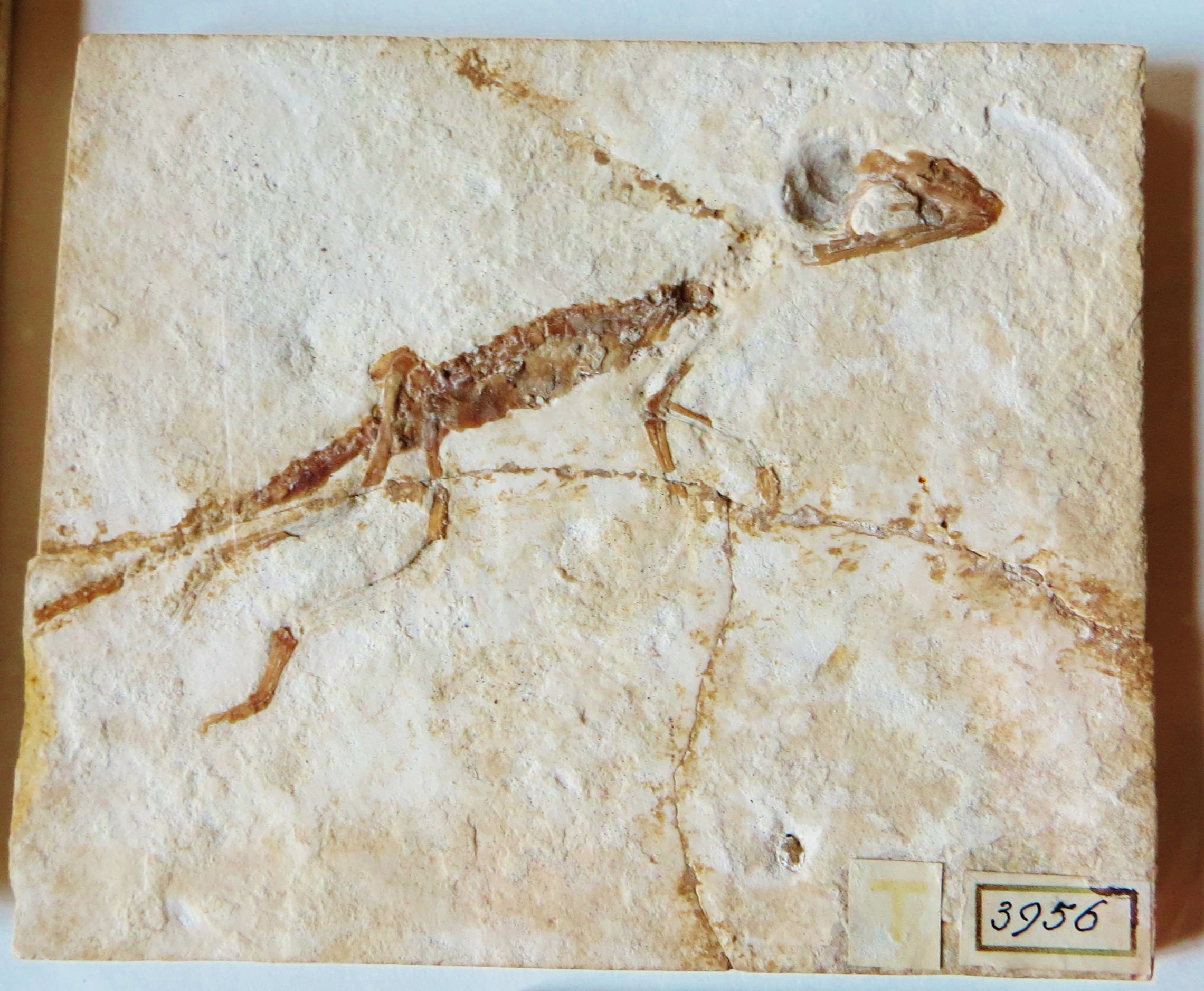
- Fossil of Atoposaurus oberndorferi in Teyler's Museum

Scientific classification
- Kingdom: Animalia
- Phylum: Chordata
- Class: Reptilia
- Clade: Archosauria
- Clade: Pseudosuchia
- Clade: Crocodylomorpha
- Family: †Atoposauridae
- Genus: †Atoposaurus von Meyer, 1850

Species
- A. oberndorferi von Meyer, 1850 (type); A. jourdani von Meyer, 1851

= Atoposaurus =

Atoposaurus Temporal range: Late Jurassic

Extinct genus of reptiles

Atoposaurus is an extinct genus of crocodylomorph. It is the type genus of the family Atoposauridae. Fossils have been found that were Late Jurassic in age from two distinct species in France and Germany.

One interesting feature of Atoposaurus is that it lacked dorsal scutes, a common characteristic of atoposaurids as well as most crurotarsans. The absence of scutes, along with its relatively small size (specimens reach lengths of up to 17 cm), narrow supratemporal fossae, wide occipital region, thin postorbital bar, and smooth ornamentation, has led some paleontologists to believe that it is perhaps a juvenile form of another genus within Atoposauridae, most likely Alligatorellus.

== History of the holotype ==
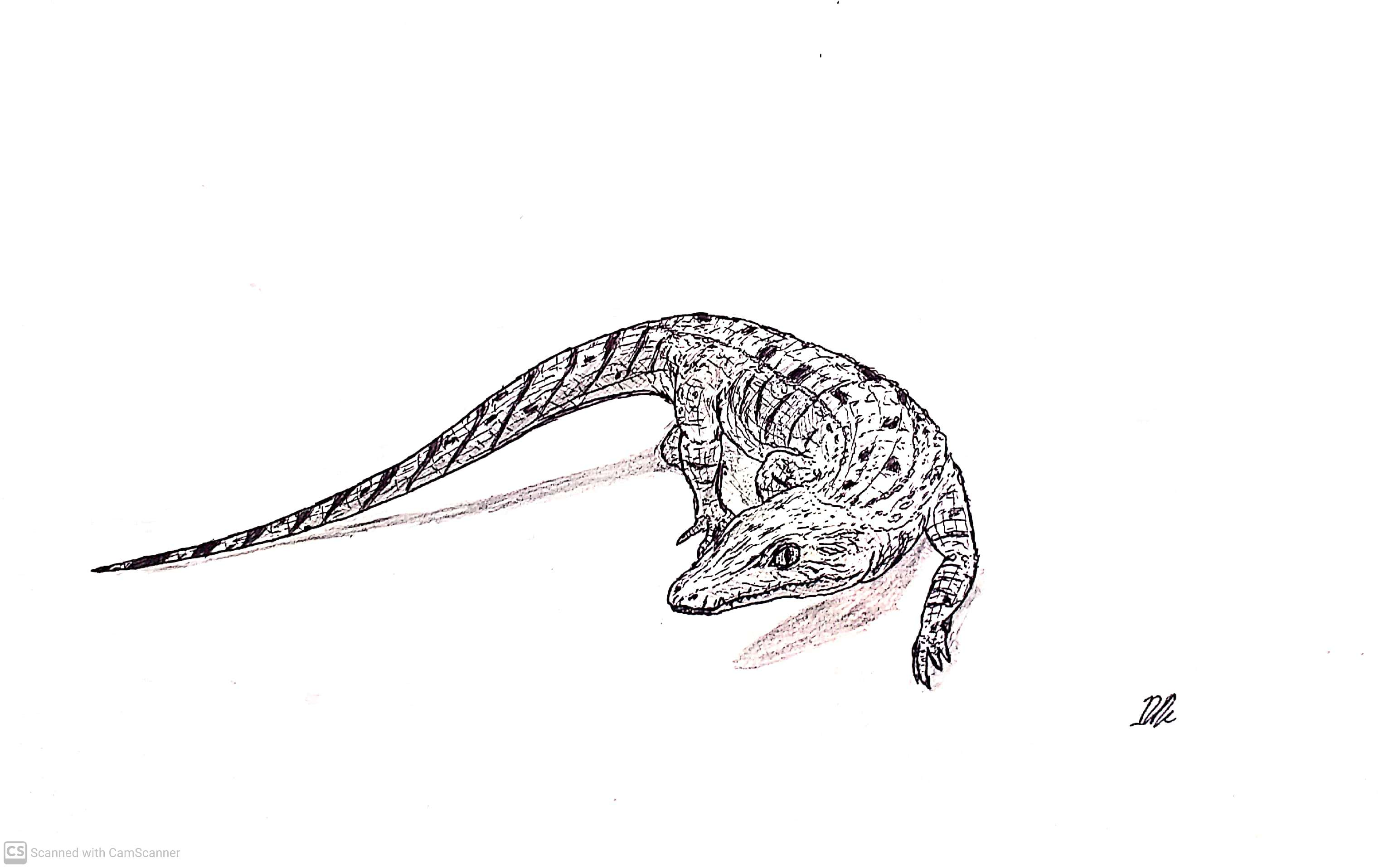
Atoposaurus oberndorferi

The Teylers Museum has a holotype specimen Atoposaurus oberndorfi that was bought by curator J.G.S. van Breda in 1863 from Adam August Krantz (1809-1872), dealer in minerals in Bonn from 1850 onwards. The purchase was made along with the other holotypes Sapheosaurus laticeps, Homeosaurus maximilliani, Rhamphorhynchus gemmingi, Pterodactylus longirostris and Pterodactylus meyeri, based on the book Zur Fauna der Vorwelt (1860) by Christian Erich Hermann von Meyer.
