= Jon Tennant =

English paleontologist (1988–2020)

- Born: 6 May 1988; Kirby Muxloe, Leicestershire, England
- Died: 9 April 2020 (aged 31); Ubud, Bali, Indonesia
- Scientific career
- Institutions: ScienceOpen
- Thesis: (2017)

Jonathan Tennant (6 May 1988 – 9 April 2020) was an English open science activist, science communicator and vertebrate paleontologist.

== Early life and paleontology ==
Tennant was born in 1988 in Kirby Muxloe, Leicestershire. His first 18 years were in Leicester with his parents and two sisters, Rebecca and Sarah. Jon attended Granby Primary School, Bushloe High School and then Beauchamp College. He obtained a PhD from Imperial College London in 2017, on a potential extinction event at the Jurassic-Cretaceous boundary. He also published research on atoposaurids, an extinct group of small early crocodilian relatives.

As a science communicator, Jon was a regular contributor to Discover on paleontology.

== Open Science movement ==
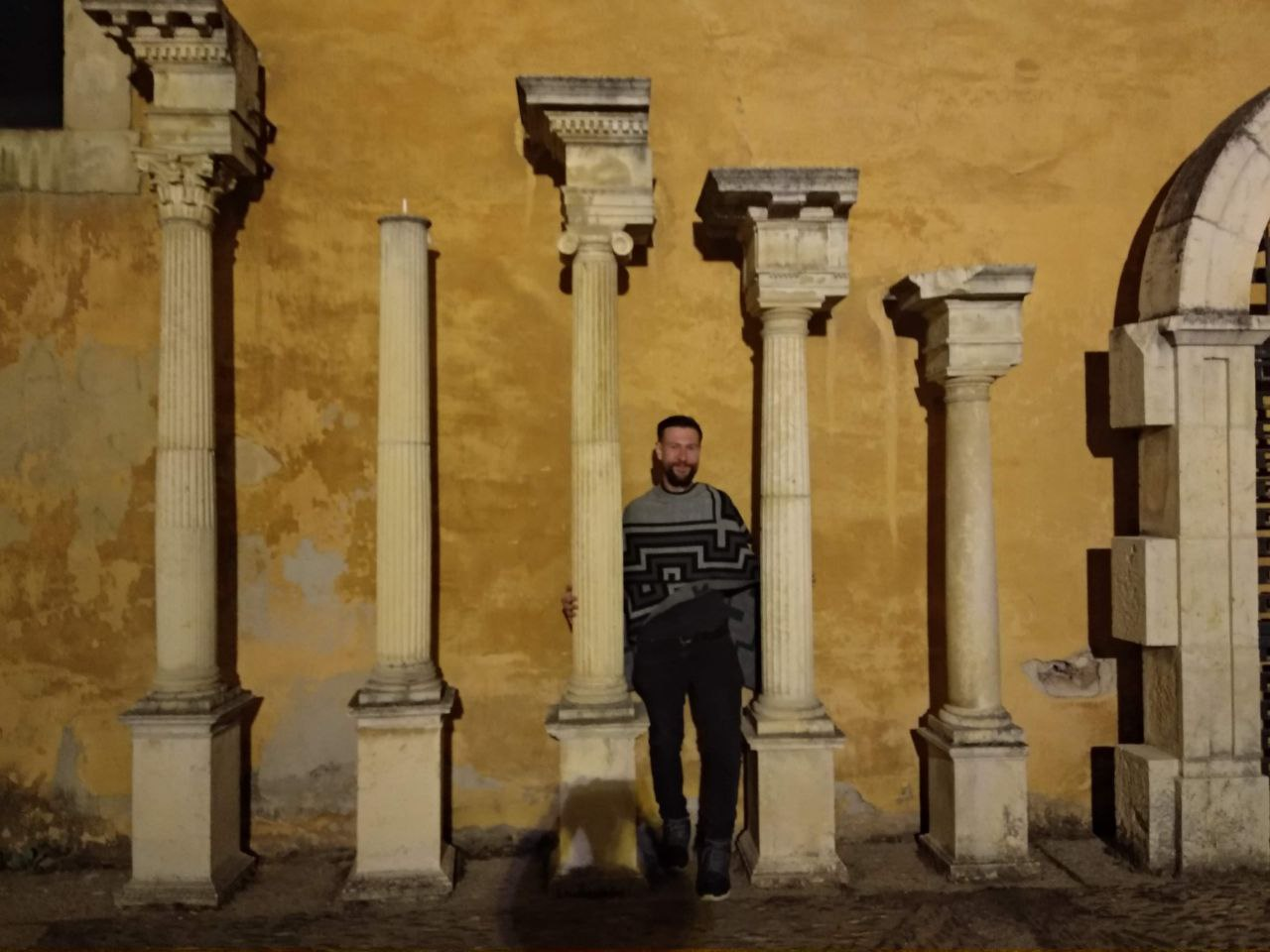
Jon Tennant "holding up the Science Pillars", REBIUN 2019 (León, Spain)

A key advocate, speaker and activist in the Open Science movement, he was a supporter of open access to knowledge and cultural change within the scientific community. He was an Editor for the PLOS Paleo Community, executive editor for Geoscience Communication, part of the Mozilla Open Leadership Cohort, and worked as Communications Director for ScienceOpen. With Jennifer Beamer, Jeroen Bosman, Björn Brembs, Neo Christopher Chung, Gail Clement, and others, he wrote an influential guide and strategy on open access and open research.

He was a panelist and keynote speaker at various academic and scholarly publishing conferences worldwide. Among his talks are

- "Open science is just good science", 2018 DARIAH Annual Event on Open Science (keynote)
- "Have we started a fire?", 2019 Open Science Fellows Program from Wikimedia Deutschland (closing event)
- "Reproducibility: Or, How I Learned to Stop Worrying and Love Open Science", 2018 IEEE Conference Evaluation and Beyond – Methodological Approaches for Visualization (invited talk).
- Invited panelist at the international conference held in 2018 to celebrate the 20th anniversary of SciELO.

In 2014, Tennant and open access advocates drafted an open letter to American Association for the Advancement of Science expressing concerns about the journal Science Advances. They cited issues with reuse restrictions, failure to meet Budapest Open Access Initiative standards, and high publication fees.

=== Institutional initiatives ===
He was a founder of the Open Science MOOC and the preprint service PaleorXiv.

=== Ban from OpenCon and sexual assault allegations ===
In 2018, Tennant was banned from open science conference OpenCon after violating the conference's anti-harassment policy. This ban was publicly announced by OpenCon in 2019. Tennant accepted that he had behaved inappropriately at a 2016 conference (which he claimed had involved an "isolated incident of dancing with a friend/colleague while at a party, and running my hands down their side") and apologised. Tennant was subsequently accused of rape and sexual assault, which Tennant denied. The ban and allegations had a serious negative impact on Tennant's standing within the open science movement and academia more broadly, causing him to lose positions in academic journals (among others) and speaking engagements.

== Later life and death ==
He later lived in Berlin, Paris, and Bali. Tennant died from a motorbike accident in Bali on 9 April 2020 at the age of 31.
