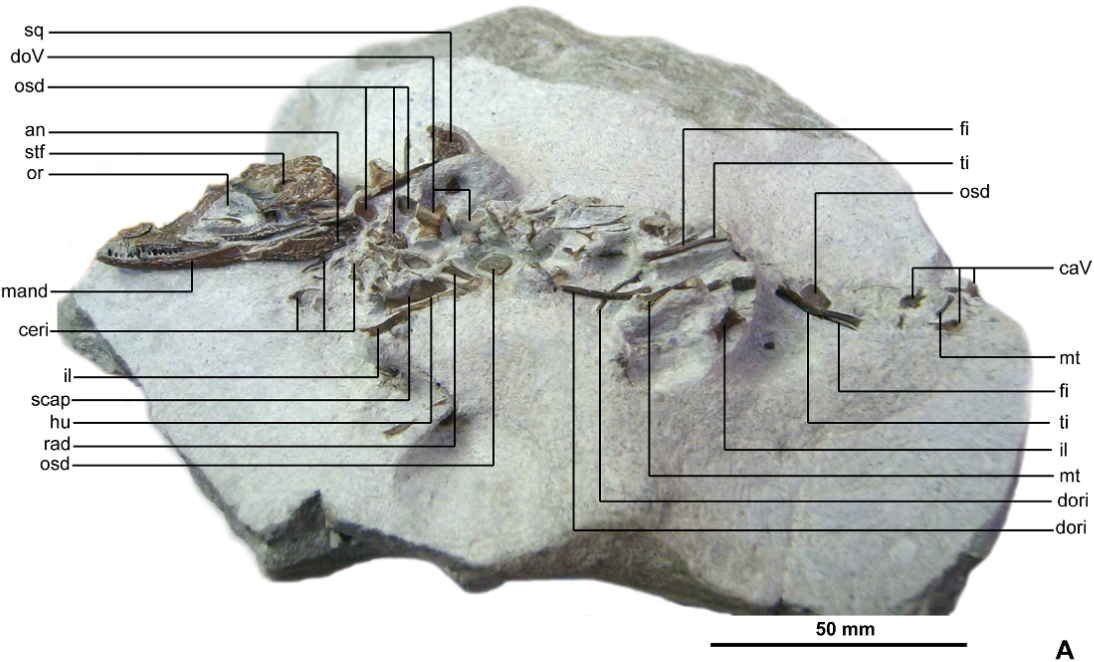
- Type specimen of Knoetschkesuchus langenbergensis

Scientific classification
- Kingdom: Animalia
- Phylum: Chordata
- Class: Reptilia
- Clade: Archosauria
- Clade: Pseudosuchia
- Clade: Crocodylomorpha
- Clade: Eusuchia
- Family: †Atoposauridae
- Genus: †Knoetschkesuchus; Schwarz et al., 2017

Type species
- Knoetschkesuchus langenbergensis Schwarz et al., 2017

Species
- K. langenbergensis Schwarz et al., 2017 (type); K. guimarotae (Schwarz & Salisbury, 2005) (originally Theriosuchus guimarotae)

= Knoetschkesuchus =

Knoetschkesuchus Temporal range: Kimmeridgian

Extinct genus of reptiles

Knoetschkesuchus is a genus of small atoposaurid crocodylomorph from the Late Jurassic of Germany and Portugal. Two species are known: the German species K. langenbergensis, described by Schwarz and colleagues in 2017 based on two partial skeletons and various isolated bones; and the Portuguese species K. guimarotae, named from over 400 specimens including several partial skeletons. Knoetschkesuchus was a small and short-snouted crocodilian, measuring about 55 centimetres (22 in) in length, that primarily fed on small prey, including invertebrates, amphibians, and mammals. This specialization towards small prey ecologically separated Knoetschkesuchus from most of the other diverse crocodilians that it lived with in the island ecosystem of Jurassic Europe.

Both species were formerly recognized as belonging to Theriosuchus; K. guimarotae was initially named as T. guimarotae, and specimens of K. langenbergensis were initially referred to T. pusillus upon their discovery. Schwarz and colleagues recognized a number of characteristics that united these two taxa to the exclusion of other species of Theriosuchus; in particular, Knoetschkesuchus only has two distinct types of teeth, lacking the leaf-shaped teeth seen in other atoposaurids. Other distinguishing traits include the relatively wide skull, and the presence of the antorbital and mandibular fenestrae in all life stages.

== Discovery and naming ==
=== K. langenbergensis ===
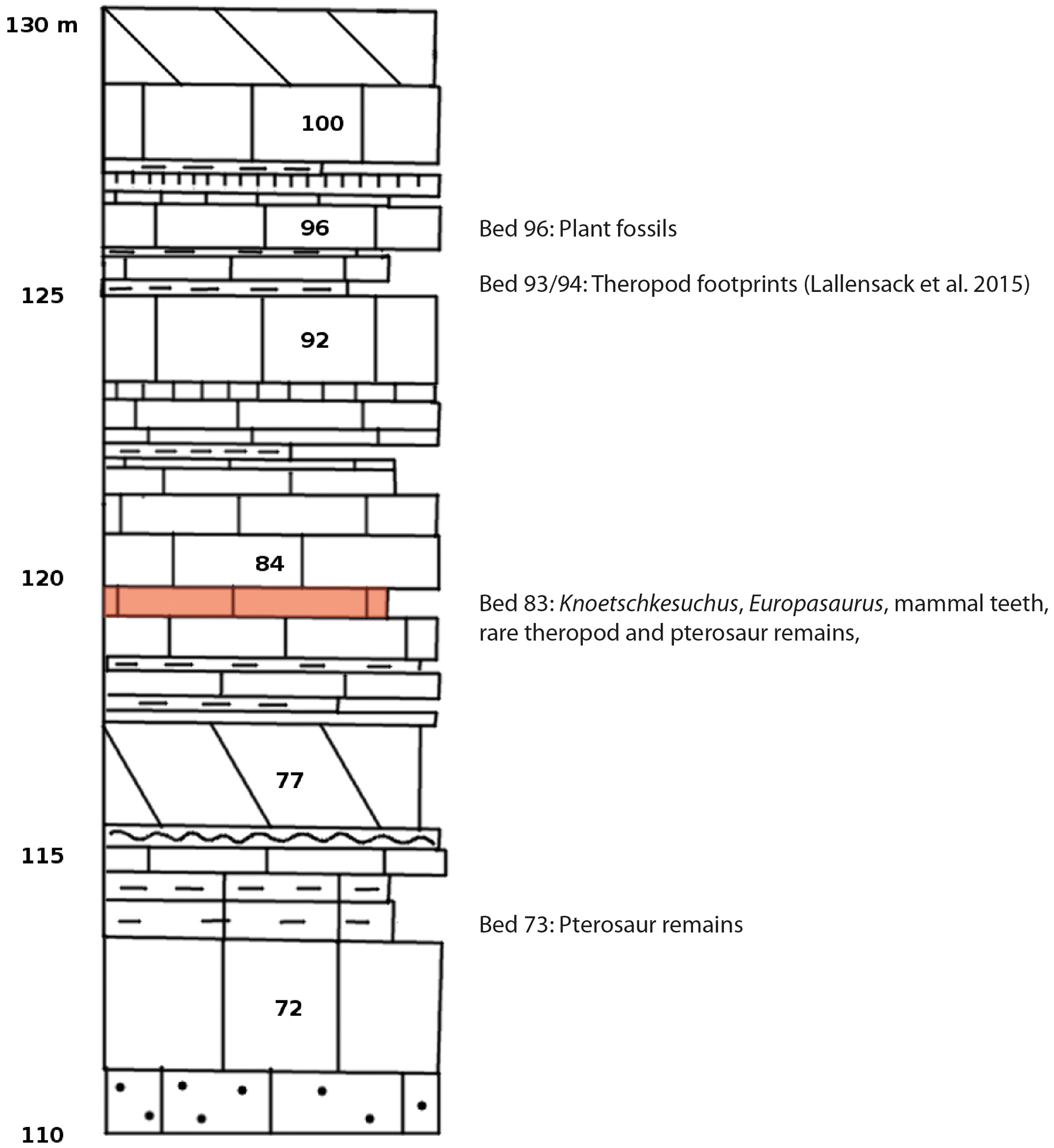
Location of Bed 83, the discovery site of K. langenbergensis, in the "Mittleres Kimmeridge"

The material of the type species of Knoetschkesuchus, K. langenbergensis, comes from a marly limestone bed (numbered as Bed 83, not Bed 93 as reported by some publications) containing recrystallized micritic intraclasts, located within the Langenberg Quarry in the Harz Mountains near Goslar, Lower Saxony, Germany. These deposits have been dated to the Upper Kimmeridgian stage of the Jurassic—specifically, to the regional equivalent of the Upper Kimmeridgian known as the Mittleres Kimmeridge, and belong to the Süntel Formation. Although well-preserved, fossils from this quarry were recovered generally by regular blasting operations in the quarry.

Specimens belonging to Knoetschkesuchus are stored at the Dinosaurier-Freilichtmuseum Münchehagen (hereafter denoted by DFMMh/FV) in Rehburg-Loccum, Germany. They are: the type specimen DFMMh/FV 200, the partial skeleton of an adult with a skull; DFMMh/FV 605, the complete skull of a juvenile; DFMMh/FV 261, an isolated angular; DFMMh/FV 790.12, an isolated left dentary; DFMMh/FV 279, an isolated femur; DFMMh/FV 790.11, an isolated metatarsal; and DFMMh/FV 325, a partial skeleton including osteoderms, vertebrae, and ribs. Stereomicroscopy was used to examine the specimens, which were described in a 2017 paper published by Daniela Schwarz, Maik Raddatz, and Oliver Wings.

The genus name Knoetschkesuchus combines the family name of Nils Knötschke, a researcher at the DFMMh who was responsible for the collection, curation, and preparation of Langenberg Quarry specimens, with the common crocodilian suffix suchus, from the Greek souchos ("crocodile"). Meanwhile, the species name langenbergensis is in reference to the provenance of this species from the Langenberg Quarry.

=== K. guimarotae ===
Schwarz et al. also assigned an additional species to Knoetschkesuchus, K. guimarotae, which was originally classified as a species of Theriosuchus. As reflected by the specific name, K. guimarotae originates from the lignite layers of the Guimarota quarry, located near Leiria, Portugal. There are two primary vertebrate-bearing lignite strata within the so-called Guimarota-strata, which are separated by marly limestone and respectively known as the "Fundschichten" and "Ruafolge" subunits; K. guimarotae is known from both of these layers. They have been assigned to the Alcobaça Formation, a subunit of the Abadia Formation, which has been dated to the Kimmeridgian on the basis of fossil ostracods.

The remains of K. guimarotae are stored at the Institute of Geological Sciences of the Free University of Berlin (hereafter IPFUB). Alongside the type specimen IPFUB Gui Croc 7308—which consists of a partial skull with jaws, a vertebra from the sacrum, and two osteoderms—over 400 additional specimens are known, most of them consisting of single isolated bones. Among these, the more complete specimens are IPFUB Gui Gui Croc 7352 (tail vertebrae, femur, osteoderms); 7441 (osteoderms and ulna); 7545 (dorsal vertebrae, ischia, osteoderms); 7564 (femur, humerus, osteoderms); 7634 (dorsal vertebrae, rib, osteoderms); and 8037 (cervical and dorsal vertebrae, and osteoderms). More specimens are known, but they remain unprepared. Some specimens show the marks of scavenging.

== Description ==
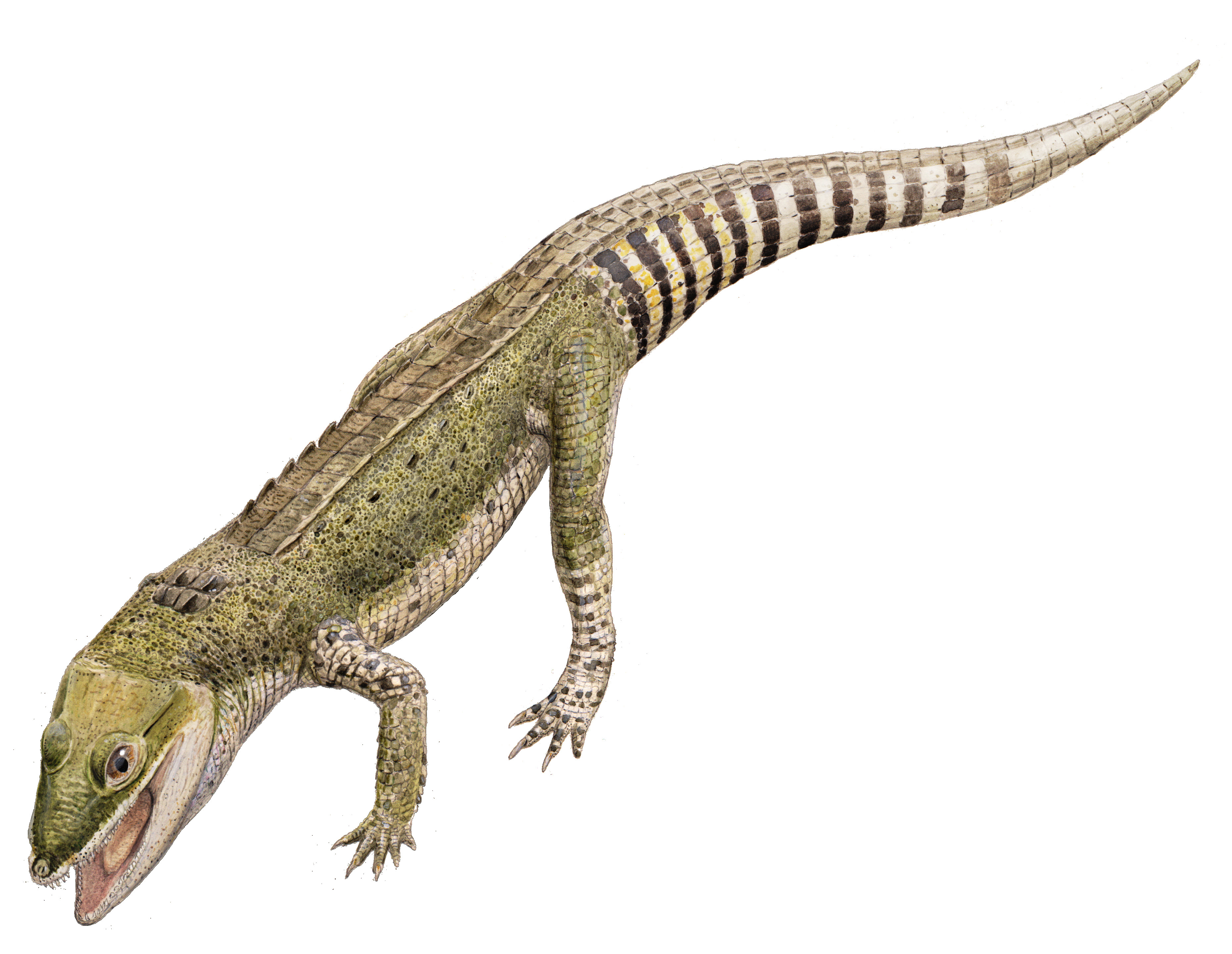
Life restoration of K. langenbergensis

As with other members of the Atoposauridae, Knoetschkesuchus is very small, with K. guimarotae measuring only 55 centimetres (22 in) long at maximum. Typical of the group, both species were quadrupedal, bearing long and slender limbs. The backs of both of the known species are covered with two rows of bony rectangular osteoderms, centred at the midline, that are wider than they are long. Each osteoderm bears a keel running longitudinally, although the keels are less-developed in K. langenbergensis. In at least K. guimarotae, the osteoderms on the tail have sharper and higher keels; the ones near the back of the tail tend to be longer than they are wide, unlike the other osteoderms, and are also vaulted. The vertebrae of K. guimarotae are additionally amphicoelous, or concave at both ends; while initially proposed as a unique trait, Theriosuchus pusillus bears amphicoelous vertebrae as well. The skull and jaws, which exhibit a number of characteristics that separate Knoetschkesuchus from other atoposaurids, are described in further detail below.

=== Snout ===
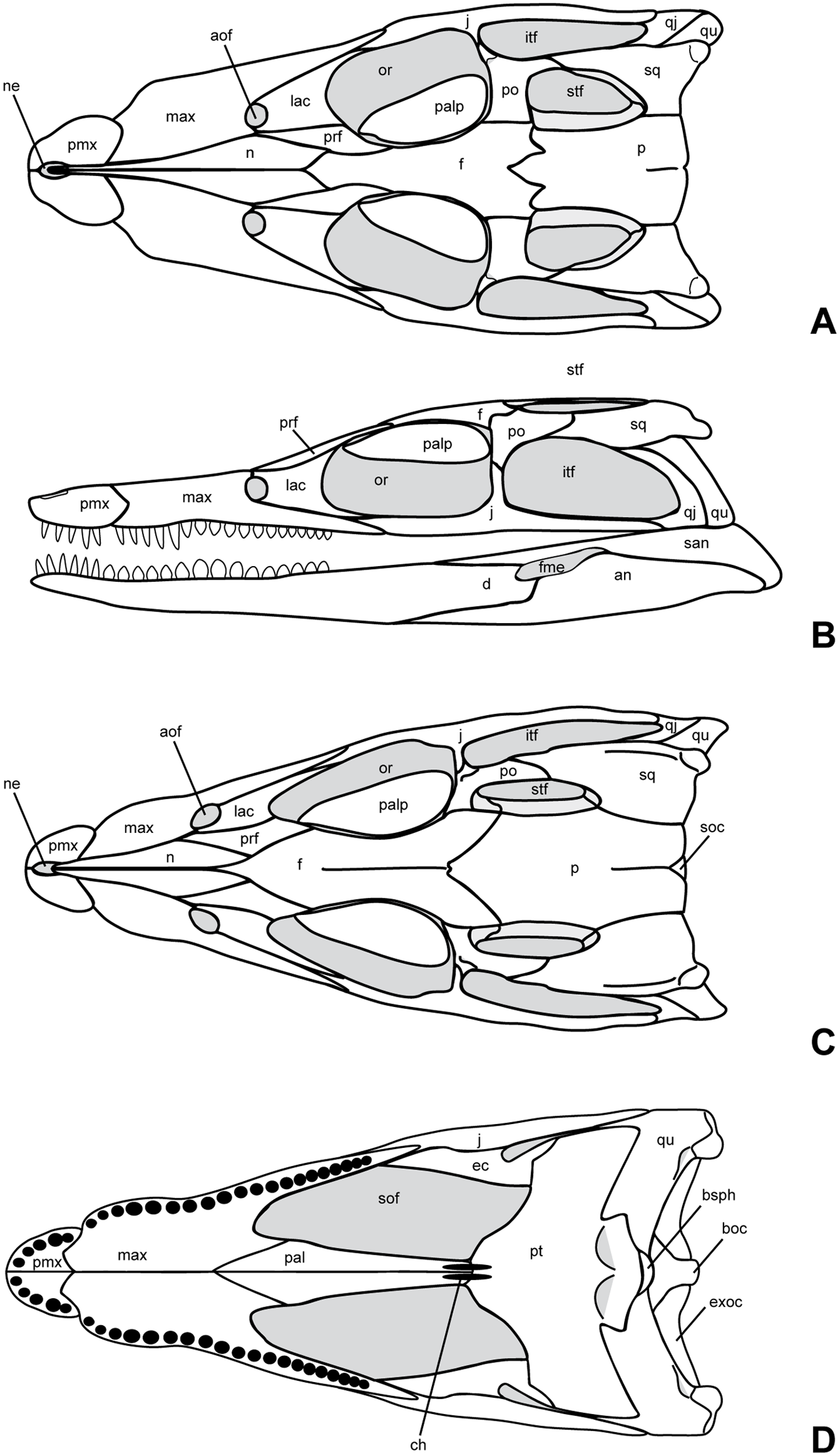
Reconstructed skulls of the type (A-B) and juvenile (C-D) specimens of K. langenbergensis

The skull of Knoetschesuchus is relatively short, with the snout taking up 47% of skull length in K. langenbergensis and 42% in K. guimarotae, which allows them to be classified as brevirostrine crocodilians. Along the side of the snout are two undulations, a smaller one on the premaxilla and a larger and broader one on the maxilla. The jagged suture between the premaxilla and maxilla is angled towards the front of the skull in K. langenbergensis and towards the back in K. guimarotae. Along the midline of the snout are the thin and wedge-like nasals; the nostrils, which face upwards, are clearly separated by the nasals in K. guimarotae, but it is not clear that this is the case in K. langenbergensis.

At the back, the nasals are separated by the frontal in K. langenbergensis, the back third of which is somewhat vaulted. The portion of the frontal between the eyes is one-third the width of the entire skull in both species, but it widens further back to form the front of the skull roof. The prefrontal is straight along its contact with the frontal and nasal (about half of the bone is in contact with each), but forms an angle between the margin of the eye socket and the lacrimal on the other side. This angle is rounded in K. guimarotae such that the bone is oval-shaped, but very pointed in K. langenbergensis such that the bone is triangular.

=== Eye socket and skull roof ===
The main body of the lacrimal is a rounded square with both faces of the bone are concave. Its contact with the nasal is rather limited in both species. The oval-shaped antorbital fenestra is small, being only 9% the length of the eye socket; its presence is unique to both species of the genus among atoposaurids. Meanwhile, the eye socket is large and oval, being 54% longer than it is tall. The drop-shaped palpebrals project out from the tops of the eye sockets. In both species, the back two-thirds of the inner surface of the palpebral is slightly concave. Both species have a squamosal in which the back third is bevelled; in K. langenbergensis, the outer margin is somewhat convex.

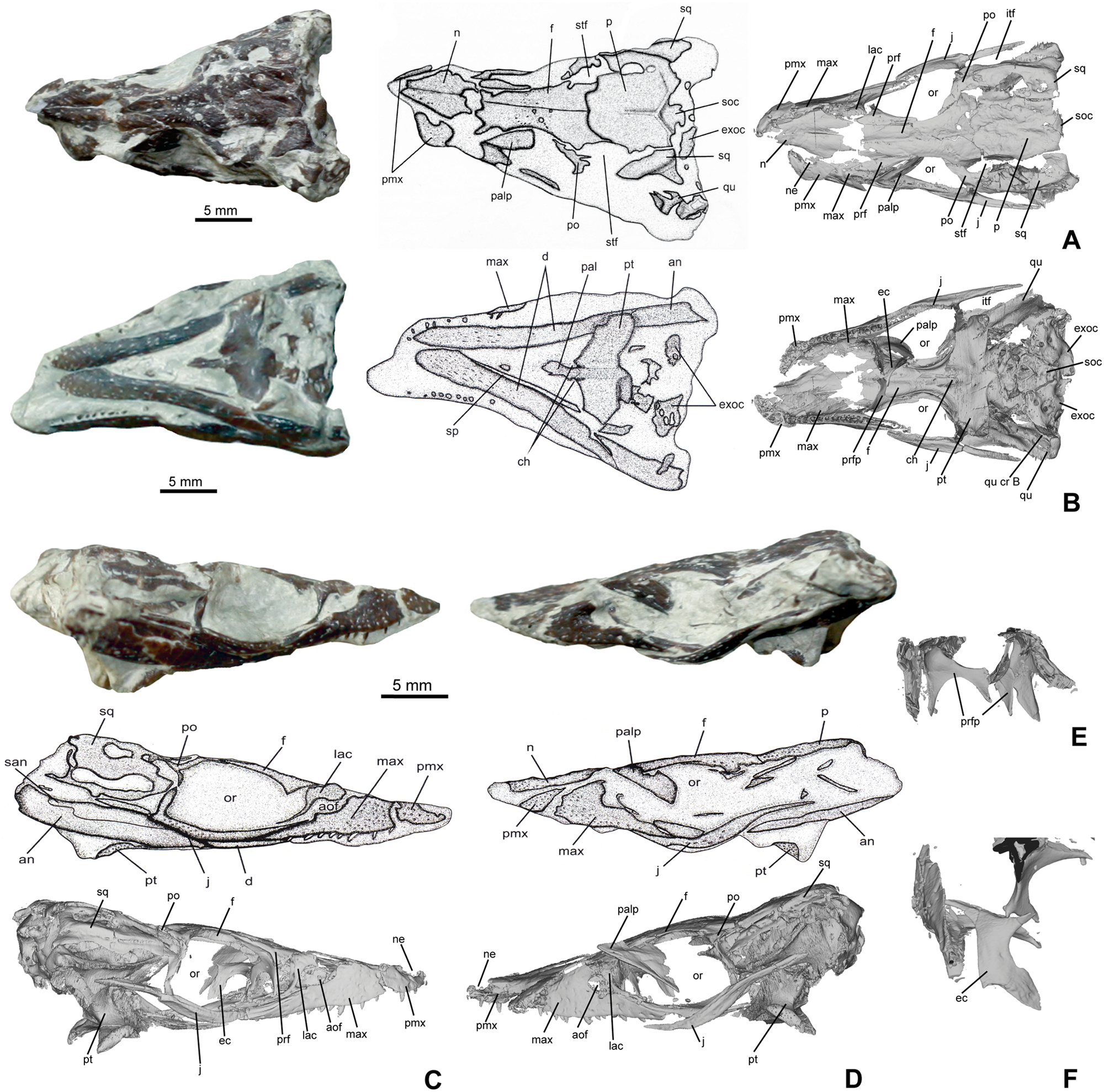
Photographs, interpretive drawings, and CT scans of the juvenile skull of K. langenbergensis

Viewed from the top, the parietal increases in width at the back; the increase is small in K. langenbergensis, such that the bone is overall rectangular, but the difference is larger in K. guimarotae. The back of the bone bears a small notch in K. langenbergensis and a general concavity in K. guimarotae that slightly exposes the underlying supraoccipital. The postorbital bears two branches that join with a gentle curve, separated by an angle of 130° in K. langenbergensis. The supratemporal fenestra is roughly square in K. guimarotae but has a thinner back end in K. langenbergensis. In both species, the maximum distance between the supratemporal fenestrae is about a third of the total width of the top of the skull. The trapezoidal infratemporal fenestra is 1.5 times as long as it is wide in K. langenbergensis.

=== Palate and braincase ===
On the bottom of the skull, the pterygoid is about twice as wide as it is long. At the front of the pterygoid is a small projection that extends backwards to form a ridge, on either side of which is a furrow-like depression (the choanal groove) containing the choanae. In Theriosuchus, unlike Knoetschkesuchus, the choanae are embedded in a wider bowl-like depression. Additionally, in both species, the bottom surface of the pterygoid is somewhat concave. Extending forward from either side of the pterygoid is the ectopterygoid; in both species, this bone is constricted near the middle to form an hourglass-like shape, but in K. langenbergensis it is also somewhat twisted to the side. The back of the bone is very concave in both species.

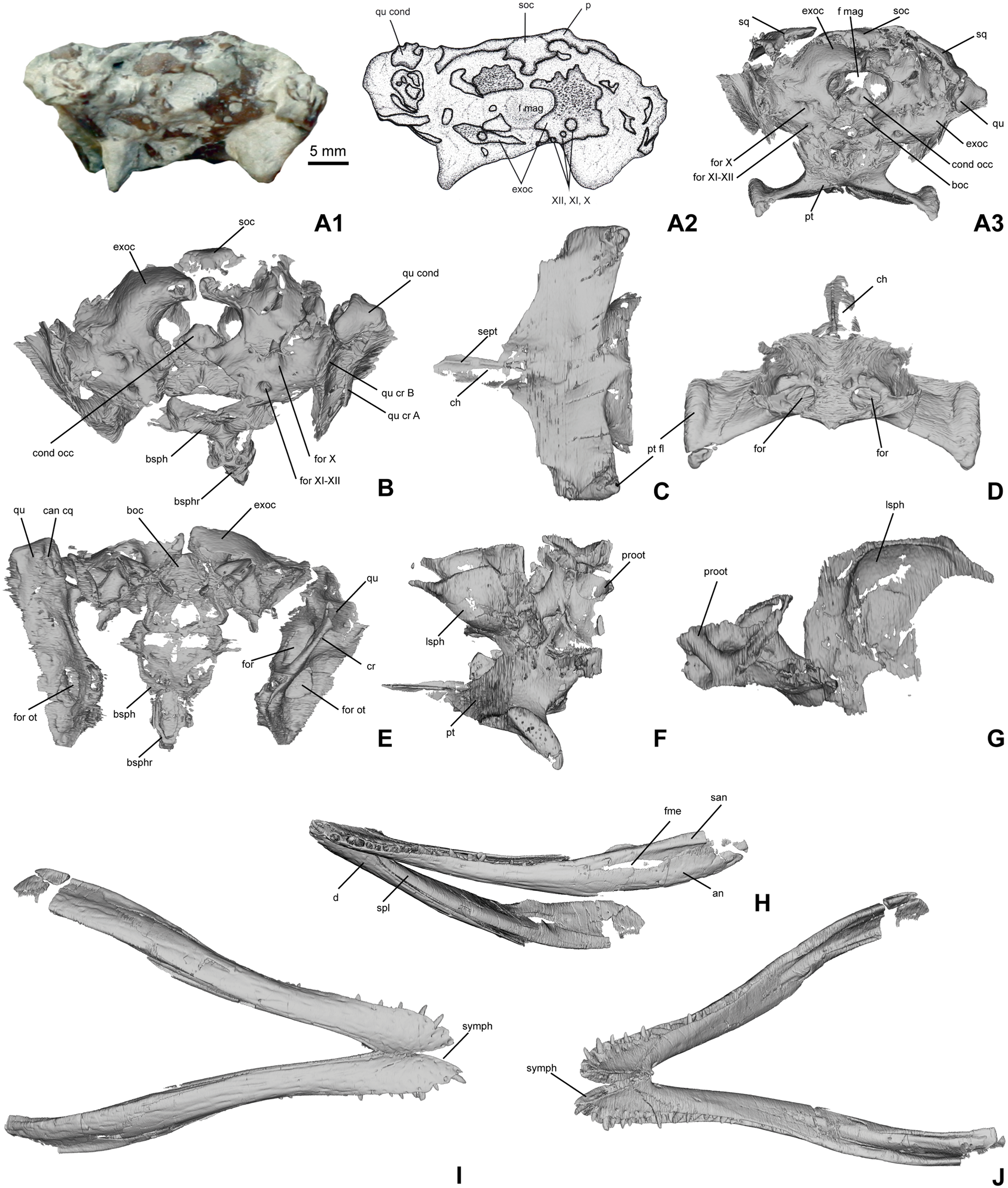
Photographs, interpretive drawings, and CT scans of the braincase and jaw of the juvenile skull of K. langenbergensis

Forming the sides of the back of the skull is the exoccipital, which surrounds most of the foramen magnum. The Eustachian tube extends downwards across the basoccipital and basisphenoid; these bones are thickened on either side of the tube in K. langenbergensis. K. guimarotae has a small rounded foramen beside the tube on the basoccipital, and a tuberosity bearing a ridge above. On the front of the basoccipital in both species, there are two rounded depressions near the bottom. The basisphenoid resembles a triangular hatchet in shape when viewed from the side.

=== Jaw ===
In K. guimarotae, the two halves of the dentary diverge from each other at an angle of 20° near the front, then 40° near the back. It also bears two convexities on the bottom of the jaw, one at the third and fourth teeth and another at the eighth to tenth teeth. The latter convexity is replaced by a concavity in K. langenbergensis. In both species, the top margin of the jaw behind the tooth row slopes upwards in a straight line. The side of the dentary is pitted, albeit much more densely so in K. langenbergensis. Near the back of the dentary in both species, the pits are replaced by longitudinal grooves. On the interior of the jaw, the splenial bears an oval foramen behind the level of the symphysis in both species, and the top of the bone bears a low and roughened crest in K. guimarotae.

The tip of the angular is situated close to the midpoint of the bone in K. langenbergensis rather than being at the back as in K. guimarotae. In both species, the back of the angular contributes to the retroarticular process. The inner surface of the angular is roughened in K. guimarotae, and the top margin of the inner wall transitions from an upward-projecting tip at the front to a low, rounded crest at the back; the same margin maintains its height along the angular in K. langenbergensis. The surangular bears a thin, forward-projecting process that, in K. langenbergensis, extends forward to the back of the tooth row and bears a groove on the bottom. The presence of the oval-shaped external mandibular fenestra is unique to the genus among atoposaurids.

=== Teeth ===
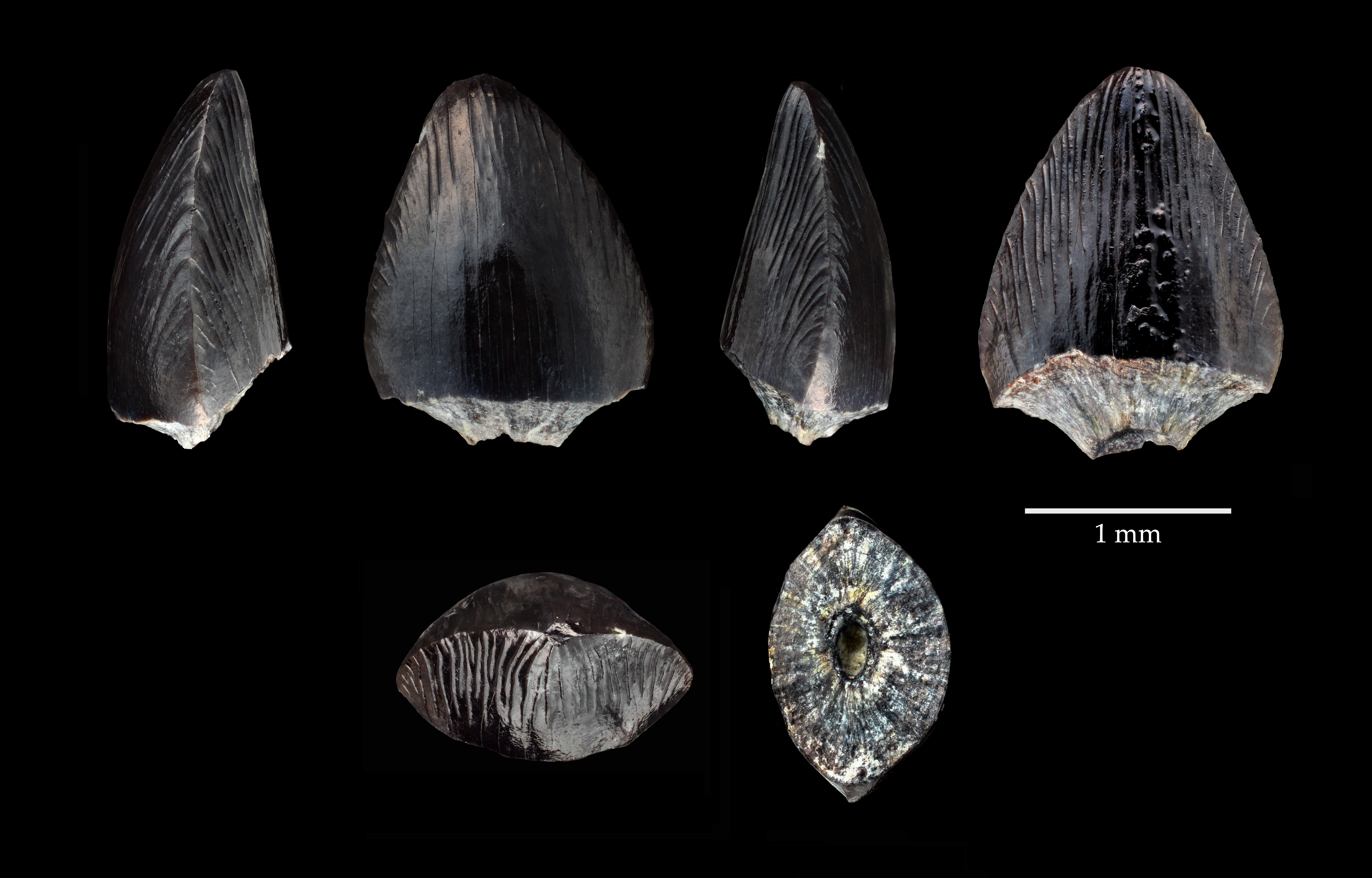
Photograph of the characteristic lancehead-shaped teeth of K. guimarotae from the back of the mouth

Both species of Knoetschkesuchus have only two distinct types of teeth, uniquely among atoposaurids. Other atoposaurids have a third type of leaf-shaped teeth. The first type of teeth, found near the front of the jaw, are conical, slightly constricted at the base, and curved slightly inwards. A subtype is represented by the canine-like or pseudocaniniform teeth. They are the fourth and fifth maxillary teeth, and are enlarged (about twice the size of the other maxillary teeth), more pointed, and more constricted at the base. The second type of teeth, which constitutes the rest of the teeth, are shaped like thin lanceheads, with a wide base and a narrower tip; in K. guimarotae all of the tips are sharp, but in K. langenbergensis they gradually become blunter.

There are 5 premaxillary teeth in both species, the fourth of which is about a third larger relative to the others. The maxilla has 12 distinct sockets in K. langenbergensis. Excluding the pseudocaniniforms, the maxillary tooth size remains roughly constant but gradually decreases after the pseudocaniniforms in both species; all tooth sockets after the twelfth are replaced by a continuous trough. In total, K. guimarotae had at least 15 maxillary teeth, and K. langenbergensis 17 or 18. Meanwhile, the dentary exhibits 21 teeth in K. langenbergensis and at least 20 in K. guimarotae. Like the maxilla, distinct sockets for dentary teeth are replaced by a groove from the eleventh tooth backwards in K. langenbergensis.

== Classification ==
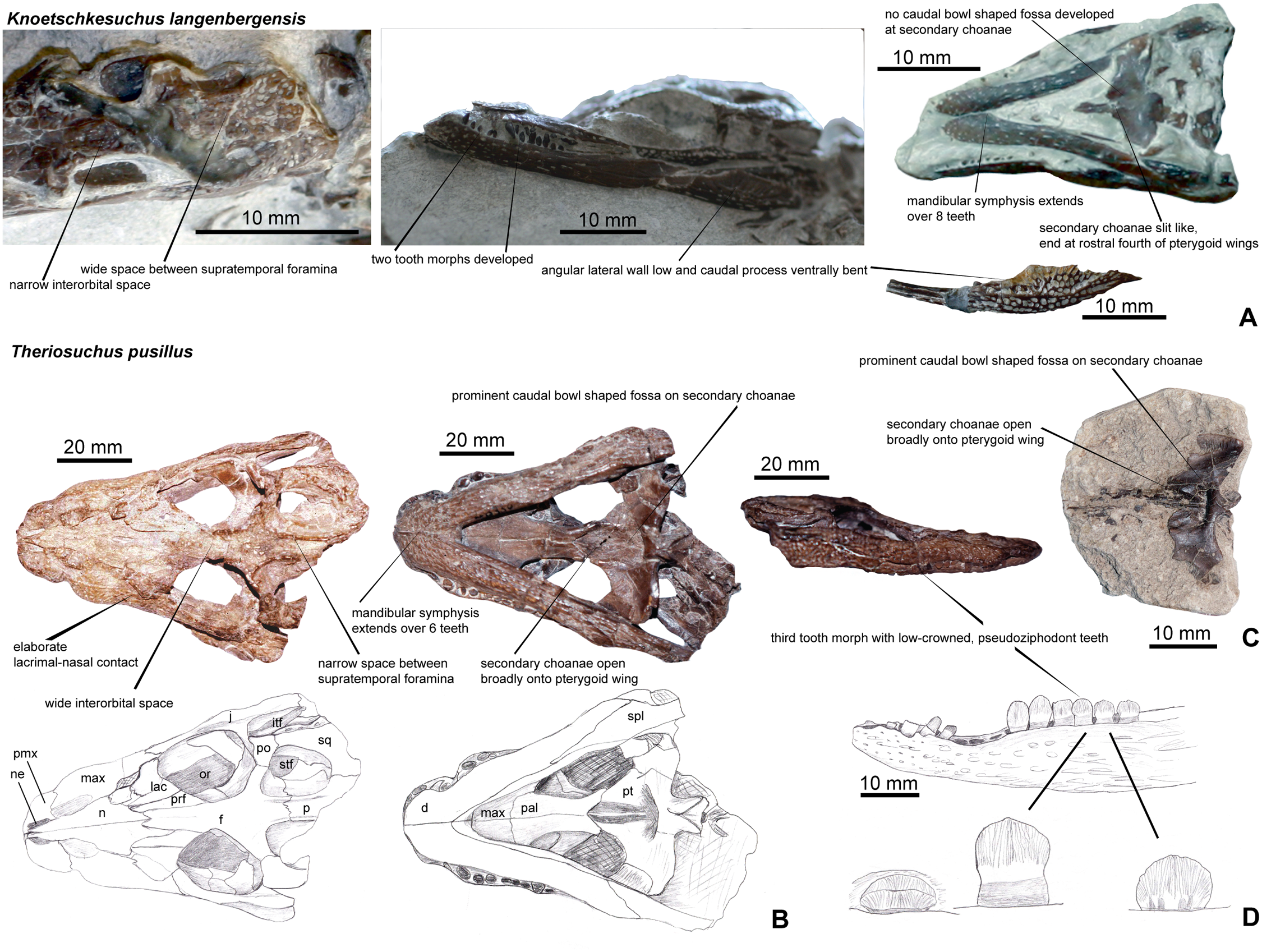
Knoetschkesuchus langenbergensis compared with Theriosuchus pusillus

When the known specimens of K. langenbergensis were first described in a preliminary fashion by a 2006 paper from Hans-Volker Karl et al., they were referred to the genus Theriosuchus. This was on the basis of the short skull, divided nostrils, large eye sockets compared to the supratemporal fenestrae, and the bevelled side of the squamosal. Specifically, they recognized its similarity to T. pusillus on the basis of its osteoderms and teeth, although they noted that the orientation of the back of the skull was different and that leaf-shaped teeth were absent. These differences were attributed to K. langenbergensis probably representing a different life stage of T. pusillus compared to the type specimen. A 2016 analysis of the relationships of the Atoposauridae, from Jonathan Tennant et al., tentatively supported the affinity of these specimens with T. pusillus on account of the teeth being situated in a groove (a trait uniting T. pusillus and "T." guimarotae in their analysis), the presence of pseudocaniniform teeth, and the lance head-shaped teeth near the back of the jaw. However, they noted that the nasals essentially completely divide the nostrils to the exclusion of other bones, which is not seen in the genus of Theriosuchus.

However, the taxonomy of Theriosuchus itself is somewhat convoluted. Many recent taxonomic studies have not provided an explicit set of characteristics that unite species of Theriosuchus and separate them from other atoposaurids; the only such diagnoses that have been produced were given by Steve Salisbury and Darren Naish in 2011, and Jeremy Martin et al. in 2010. In 2016 Mark Young et al. criticized these diagnoses, noting that many characters were either more widely distributed among the Atoposauridae, difficult to assess, or—in the case of the latter diagnosis—not present at all. Young et al. provided an alternative diagnosis containing nine traits, mostly involving teeth; however, they also noted that there was variation among the expression of these traits, which calls into question the monophyly of Theriosuchus. K. langenbergensis differs from this diagnosis in four out of nine traits, which Schwarz et al. cited as a basis for both the generic separation of Knoetschkesuchus and the necessity of revising the diagnosis further.

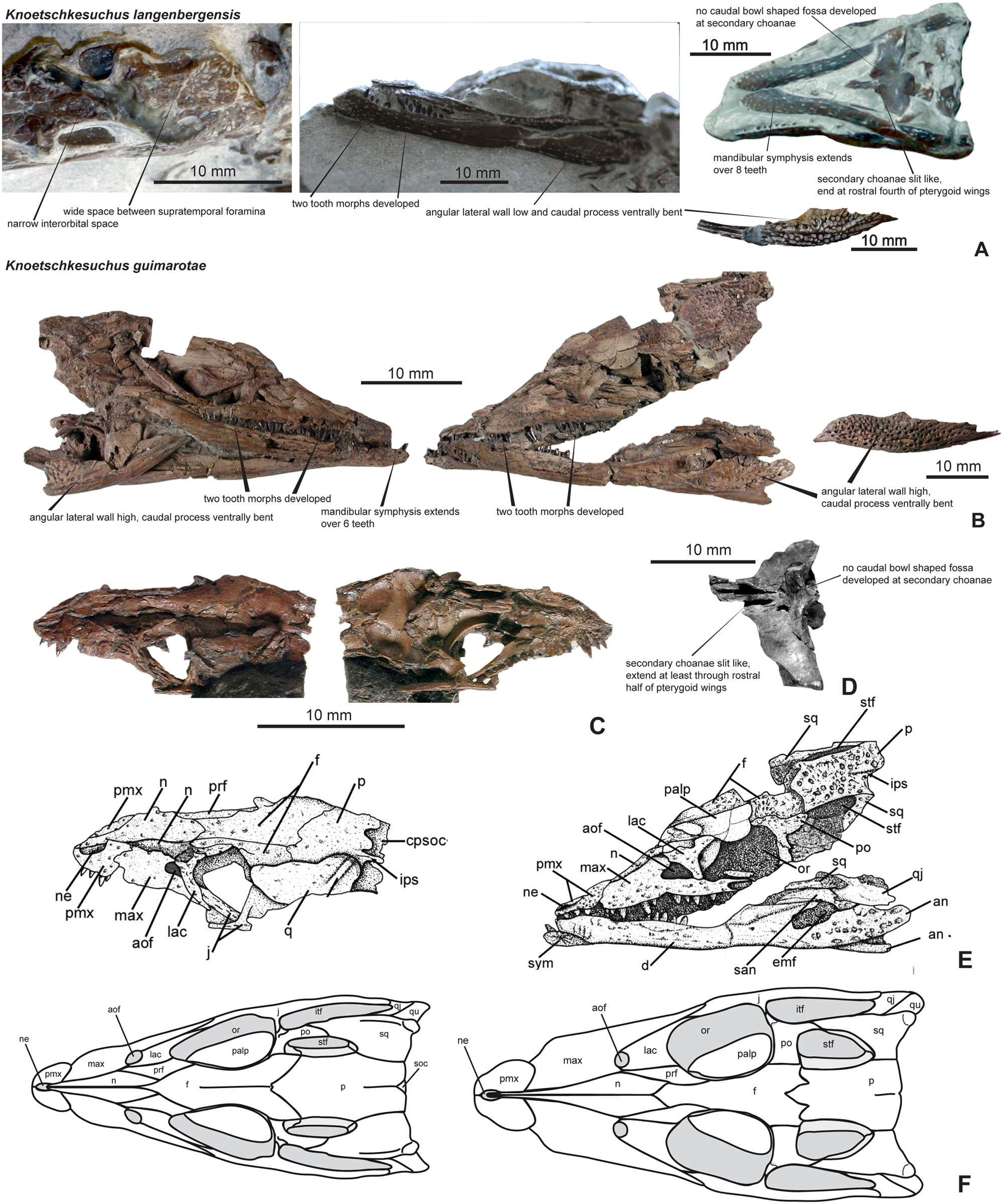
Knoetschkesuchus langenbergensis compared with Knoetschkesuchus guimarotae

According to Schwarz et al., seven traits unite K. langenbergensis and K. guimarotae, and separate them from other species referred to Theriosuchus. These include the presence of only two unique tooth morphotypes; the choanae being placed in shallow grooves rather than a bowl-like depression; the relatively wide top of the skull; the presence of antorbital and mandibular fenestrae in all life stages; and the relatively limited contact between the lacrimal and nasal. Additionally, K. langenbergensis differs from other species in lacking teeth with low crowns; having a longer maxillary symphysis; having a crest on the side of the downward-projecting process of the postorbital; having overlap between the postorbital and the front of the squamosal; and a rectangular parietal that does not form part of the supratemporal fenestra.

In the 2017 description of K. langenbergensis, Schwarz et al. used the 2015 phylogenetic dataset of Alan Turner, which was revised to remove irrelevant characteristics, add K. langenbergensis and T. grandinaris, and correct flaws in the coded traits of K. guimarotae (due to low-resolution images, inaccuracies in the original reconstruction, and the acquirement of new data). The phylogenetic trees recovered by this analysis consistently found that Atoposauridae, represented by Knoetschkesuchus, Theriosuchus, and Alligatorium, forms a monophyletic clade. Within this clade, a close relationship between K. langenbergensis and K. guimarotae, excluding other Theriosuchus species, was strongly supported, providing further evidence of these two species forming a separate genus. In some trees, T. grandinaris was also close to Knoetschkesuchus. The most parsimonious arrangement is reproduced below.

- Eusuchia
  - - - Pachycheilosuchus trinquel
      - - - Isisfordia duncani
          - - - Acynodon adriaticus
              - Acynodon iberoccitanus
            - - Susisuchus anatoceps
              - - Iharkutosuchus makadii
                - Hylaeochampsa vectiana
    - - - Allodaposuchus subjuniperus
        - Allodaposuchus precedens
      - - Atoposauridae
          - Theriosuchus symphiestodon
          - - - Theriosuchus pusillus
              - Alligatorium spp.
            - - Theriosuchus grandinaris
              - Knoetschkesuchus
                - Knoetschkesuchus langenbergensis
                - "Theriosuchus" guimarotae
        - Paralligatoridae
  - Crocodylia

== Paleoecology ==
Being relatively small, Knoetschkesuchus would have mainly fed on invertebrates and possibly small vertebrates (including amphibians and mammals). The same diet is observed in modern juvenile crocodilians of the same size class.

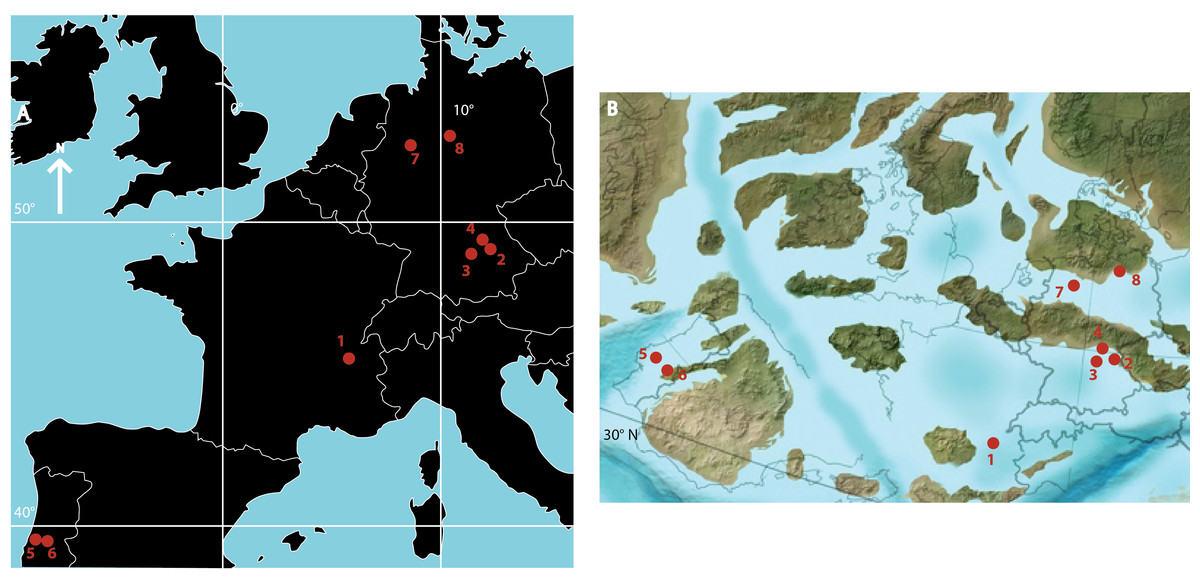
Localities of Late Jurassic atoposaurids shown on present-day (a) and Late Jurassic (b) maps

During the Kimmeridgian, Europe was covered by the shallow inland Tethys Ocean, with exposed landmasses being a series of scattered archipelagos. Highly variable sea levels supported a highly diverse insular crocodilian fauna, with biodiversity (that of atoposaurids in particular) being driven strongly by allopatric speciation. The two species of Knoetschkesuchus were part of similar faunas, in both of which they functioned as small predators ecologically partitioned from the other contemporary crocodilians; it is likely that these faunas originated through dispersal over larger landmasses. A similar faunal exchange occurred with the Wessex-Weald Basin of England.

=== K. langenbergensis ===
The Langenberg Quarry, where K. langenbergensis is known from, is part of the Lower Saxony Basin, which would have been part of the landmass associated with the Rhenisch, Bohemian, and London-Brabant Massifs. During the Kimmeridgian, it would have been a shallow marine environment; however, this does not imply that K. langenbergensis was marine, since the animals and plants of the Langenberg Quarry were probably transported allochthonously (albeit only by a short distance) from the surrounding islands. Brackish and freshwater sediments are also present in the quarry, which implies that there was occasional freshwater influx. Twigs and conifer cones indicate that the araucarian Brachyphyllum was present at the site.

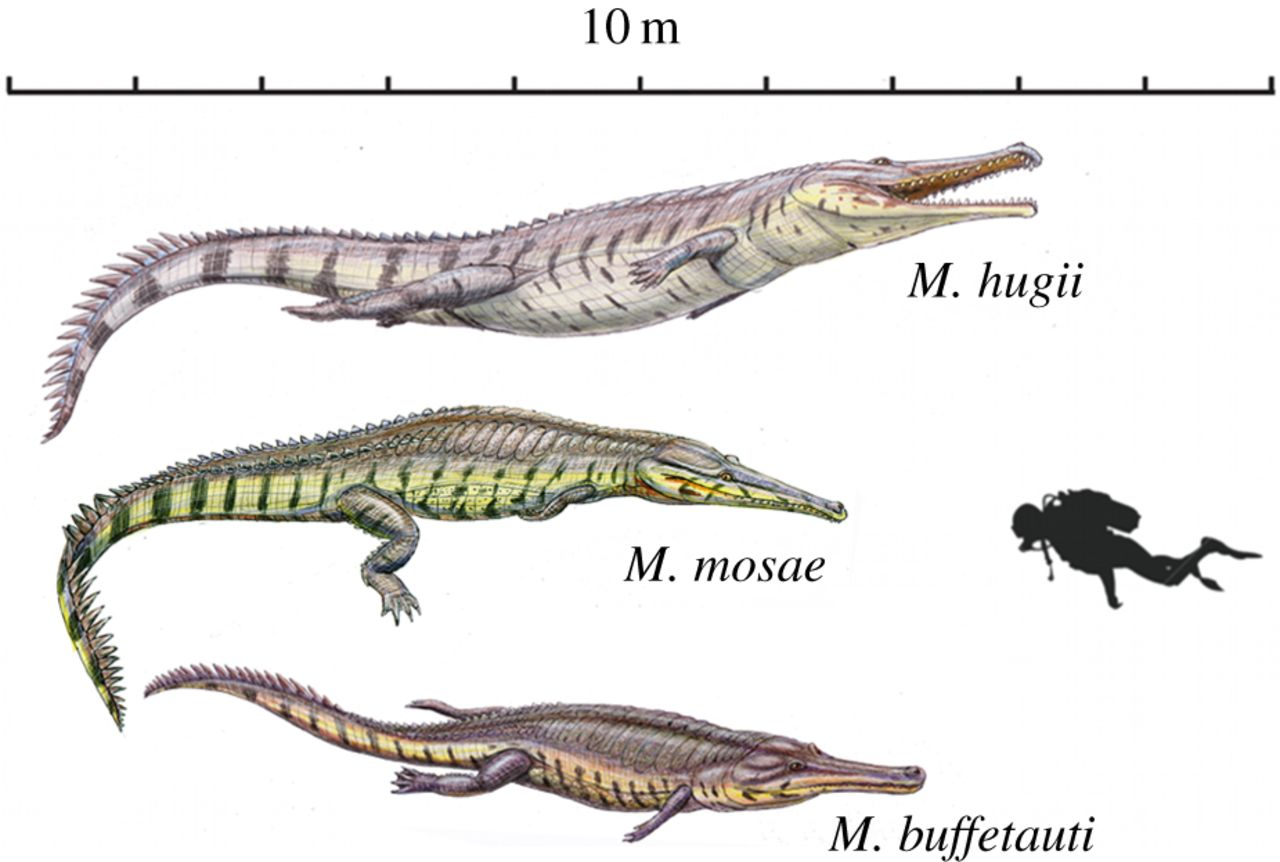
Reconstruction of Machimosaurus species; M. hugii was present alongside both Knoetschkesuchus species

Besides K. langenbergensis, other crocodilians from the Langenberg Quarry include the marine Machimosaurus hugii and Steneosaurus aff. brevirostris, which would have lived offshore and fed on turtles and fish; and the amphibious generalist Goniopholis simus, which subsisted on a diet of both shelly and soft prey like modern alligators. The quarry is best known as the type locality of the brachiosaurid sauropod dinosaur Europasaurus holgeri, which was an insular dwarf. Isolated teeth show that there were at least four different types of theropods present at the locality, including the megalosaurid Torvosaurus sp. as well as an additional megalosaurid and indeterminate members of the Allosauridae and Ceratosauria; theropod tracks from two different species (not identifiable to the family level) are also known. Remains attributable to diplodocids (possibly also dwarfed) and stegosaurs have also been found, alongside an indeterminate dsungaripterid pterosaur.

Non-archosaurs are also present in the Langenberg Quarry. These include a paramacellodid lizard; the turtles Thalassemys sp., Plesiochelys etalloni, and a juvenile eucryptodiran; plagiaulacid multituberculate, dryolestid, and docodont mammals known from teeth; the mammaliaform Storchodon; a diverse actinopterygian fish fauna dominated by Lepidotes sp. but also including Macromesodon sp., Proscinetes sp., Coelodus sp., Macrosemius sp. (or Notagogus sp.), Histionotus sp., Ionoscopus sp., Callopterus sp., Caturus sp., Sauropsis sp., Belonostomus sp., and Thrissops subovatus; and five morphotypes of hybodonts plus the neoselachians Palaeoscyllium sp., two distinct Synechodus sp., and two distinct Asterodermus sp.

=== K. guimarotae ===
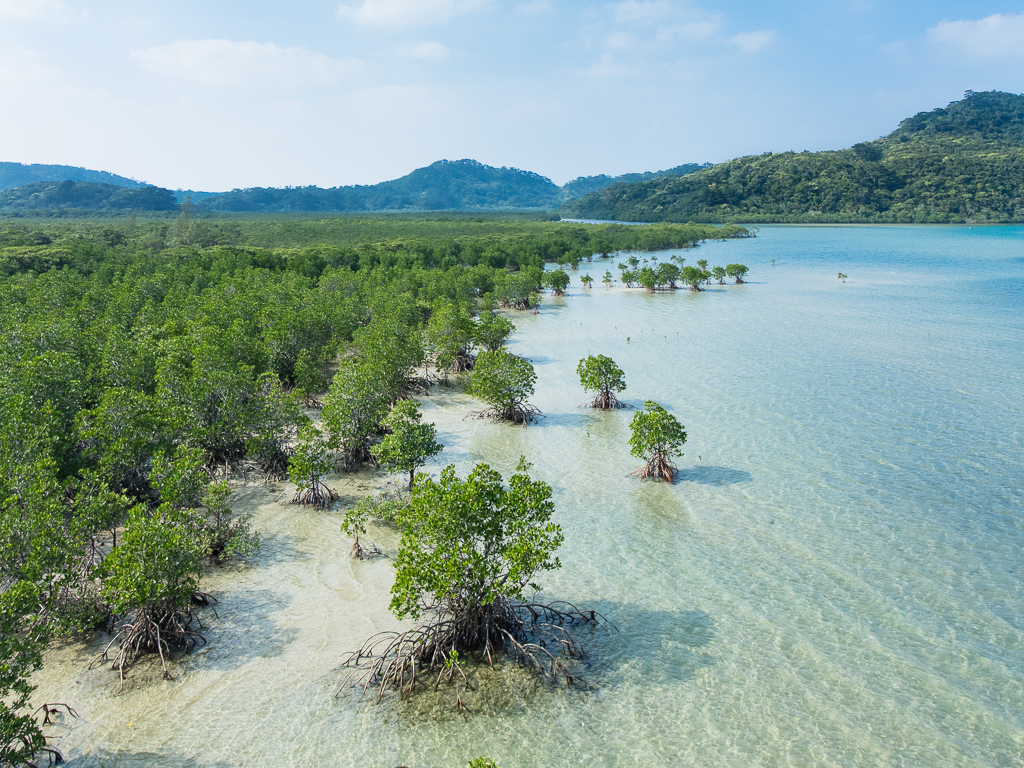
A modern mangrove swamp; K. guimarotae would have inhabited a similar environment

The Guimarota locality is located in the eastern Lusitanian Basin, which is part of the Iberian Meseta. The vertebrate-bearing Guimarota-strata was deposited in a brackish lagoon that periodically received both freshwater and saltwater influxes. Ecologically, the environment would have been akin to a modern mangrove swamp. Plants known from megafossils include the horsetails Equisetum and Schizoneura; the seed fern Caytonia; the cycad Otozamites; the araucaria Brachyphyllum; Ginkgo; and the charophyte algae Porochara. Additionally, plant families known only from pollen include lycopods, forked ferns, possible scaly tree ferns (which may be matoniaceans or dicksoniaceans instead), royal ferns, the seed fern Sphenopteris, cypresses, and pines. Most of the preserved organisms probably originated from around the swamp, although there may have been minimal transportation by water currents.

Many crocodilians are known from the Guimarota mine. The marine Machimosaurus hugii is again present, as is Goniopholis (although as a different species, G. baryglyphaeus). Additionally, Bernissartia sp., Lisboasaurus estesi, and Lusitanisuchus mitracostatus have also been found; the latter two were small, being less than 50 centimetres (20 in) in length, and likely also fed on insects like K. guimarotae. Dinosaurs from Guimarota are mainly known from teeth, and include a brachiosaurid, which is also rather small in size; theropods, including Stokesosaurus sp. (known from body fossils), Compsognathus sp., allosaurids, a ceratosaur similar to Ceratosaurus, a taxon similar to the phylogenetically problematic Richardoestesia, dromaeosaurids, troodontids, and archaeopterygiforms; and the ornithopods Phyllodon henkeli and an iguanodont similar to Camptosaurus. Other diverse vertebrates, including chondrichthyans, osteichthyans, albanerpetontid amphibians, turtles, lizards, rhamphorhynchid pterosaurs, and docodont and dryolestid mammals (including Henkelotherium guimarotae) are also present. Invertebrates are represented by ostracods and molluscs.
