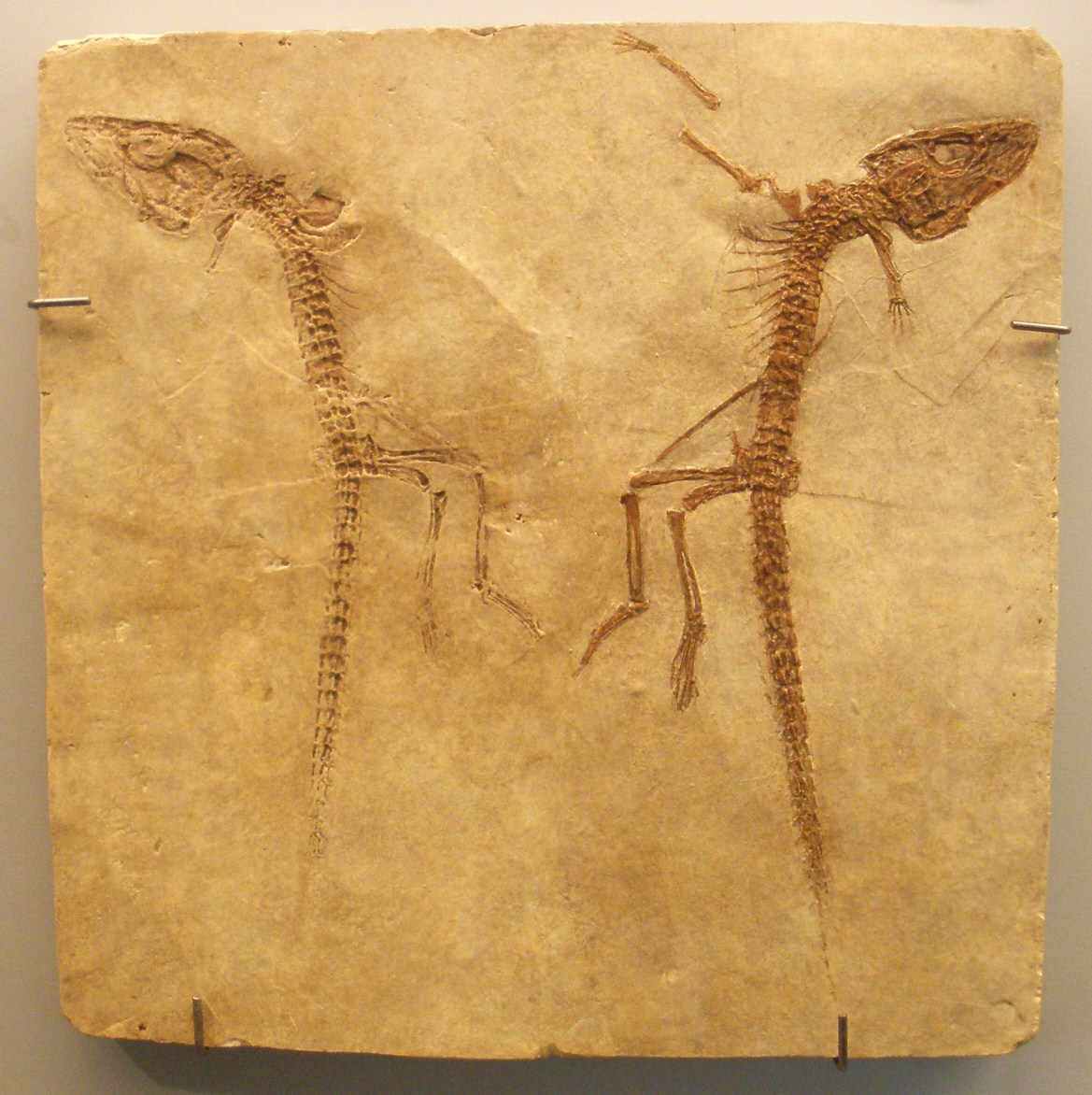
- Alligatorellus beaumonti in the Royal Belgian Institute of Natural Sciences.

Scientific classification
- Domain: Eukaryota
- Kingdom: Animalia
- Phylum: Chordata
- Class: Reptilia
- Clade: Archosauria
- Clade: Pseudosuchia
- Clade: Crocodylomorpha
- Clade: Crocodyliformes
- Family: †Atoposauridae
- Genus: †Alligatorellus; Gervais, 1871

Type species
- †Alligatorellus beaumonti Gervais, 1871

= Alligatorellus =

Alligatorellus Temporal range: Late Jurassic

Extinct genus of reptiles

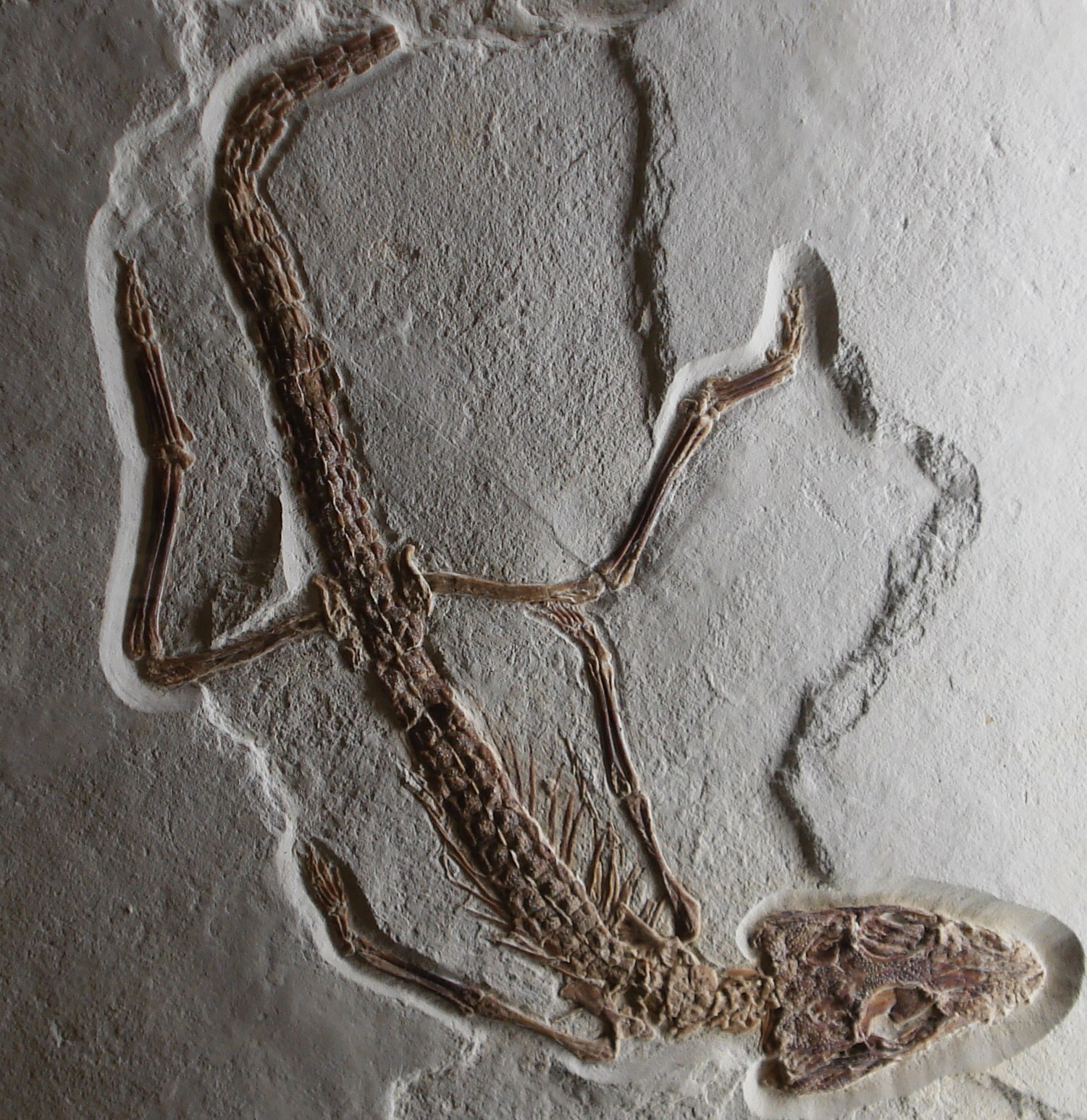
Fossil specimen

Alligatorellus is an extinct genus of atoposaurid crocodyliform found in France that was related to Atoposaurus.

A skeleton of Alligatorellus has also been found in the Solnhofen Limestone of Kelheim, Germany. The limestone was deposited in a marine environment and the individual may have washed into a lagoon where it was fossilized. Remains of four crinoids that lived in the lagoon are found in the same block as the skeleton. The skeleton includes osteoderms and limb bones, which are three-dimensionally preserved. The German skeleton shows more details of atoposaurid anatomy than most fossils, as other atoposaurid remains are compressed flat.
