= Adam August Krantz =

German mineralogist

Adam August Krantz (6 December 1808 in Neumarkt in Schlesien – 6 April 1872 in Berlin) was a German mineralogist.

== Life ==
In 1833 he founded a mineral dealership in 1833 in Freiberg while a student at Freiberg Mining Academy. In 1836 the company moved to Brüderstraße 39 in Berlin. The next move was to Bonn in 1850. August Kranz became one of the foremost mineral dealers in Europe.

August Krantz's son-in-law, Theodor Hoffmann ran the business following Krantz's death in 1872. Hoffmann sold Krantz's own collection of over 14,000 mineral specimens to the Mineralogisches Museum der Universität Bonn de:Mineralogisches Museum der Universität Bonn and ran the dealership until 1888, assisted by the mineralogist Carl Hintze. August's nephew, Friedrich Ludwig Robert Krantz (1859–1926) joined the Krantz firm in 1888 and managed it from 1891 changing the name from "A. Krantz" or "Dr. A, Krantz" to "Dr. F. Krantz and later to "Dr. F. Krantz, Rheinisches Mineralien-Kontor". In 1926 his widow Olga took charge of the business, with her nephew, Fritz Krantz. Fritz had worked for Ward's Natural Science Establishment in Rochester U.S.A. In 1974 Fritz Krantz transferred the dealership to his daughter Renate Krantz.

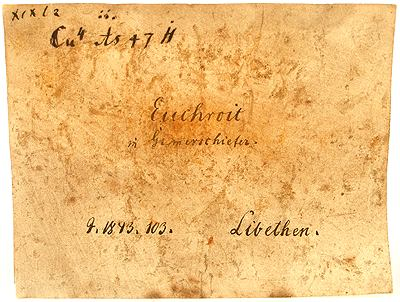
Euchroite from Ľubietová label

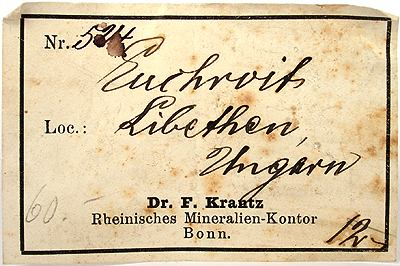
Euchroite from Ľubietová label

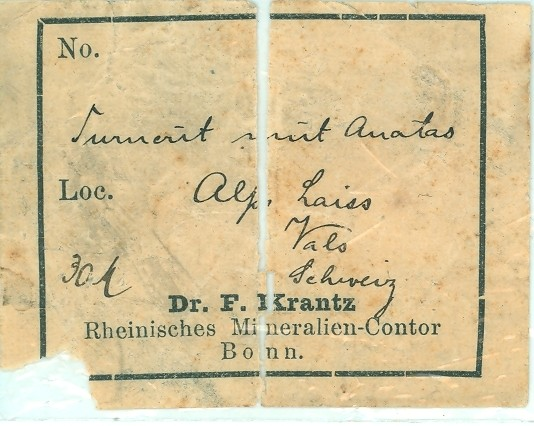
Bonn label

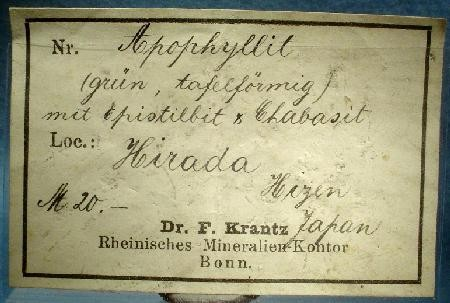
Label of a specimen from Japan
