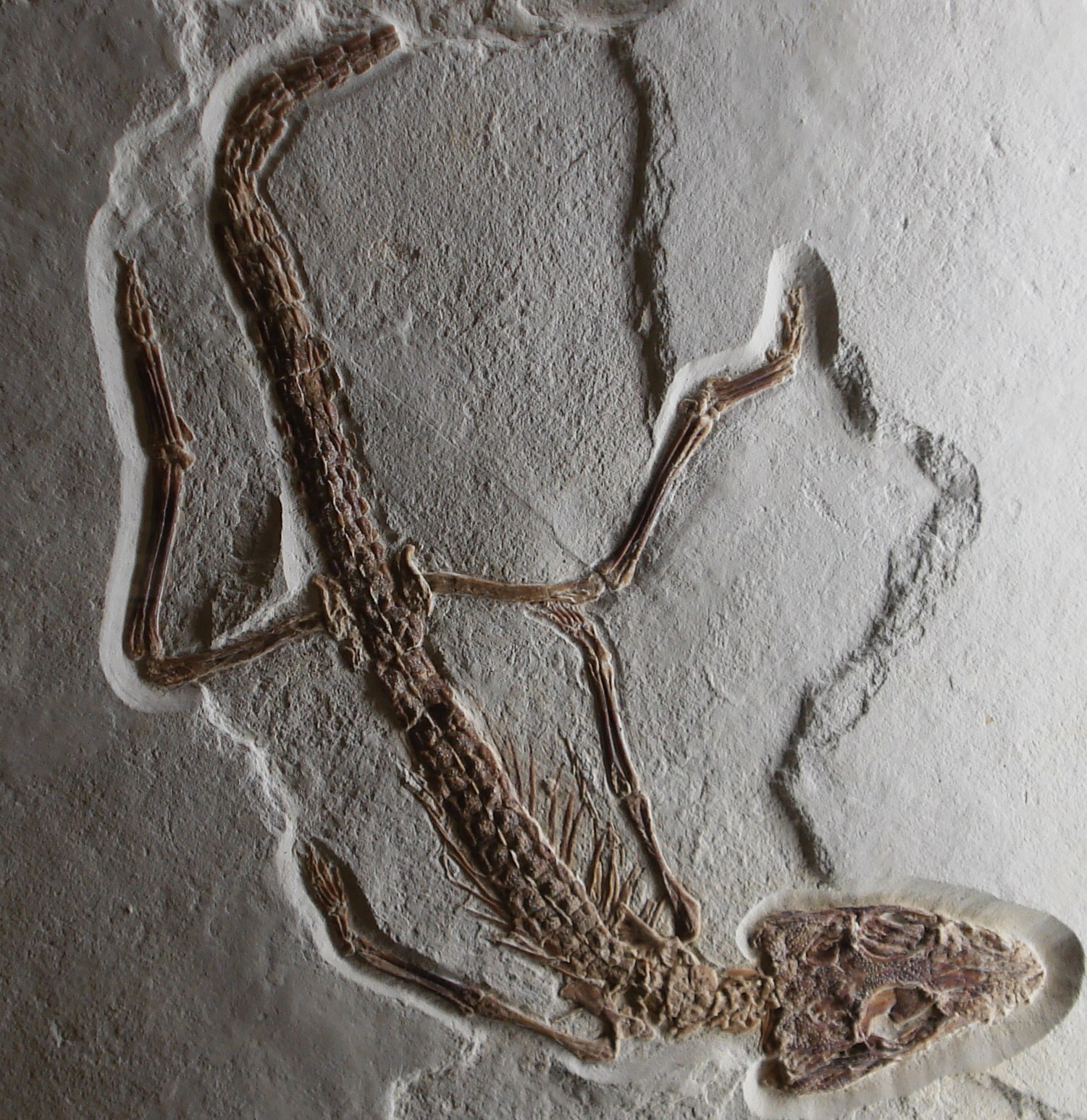
- Specimen of Alligatorellus
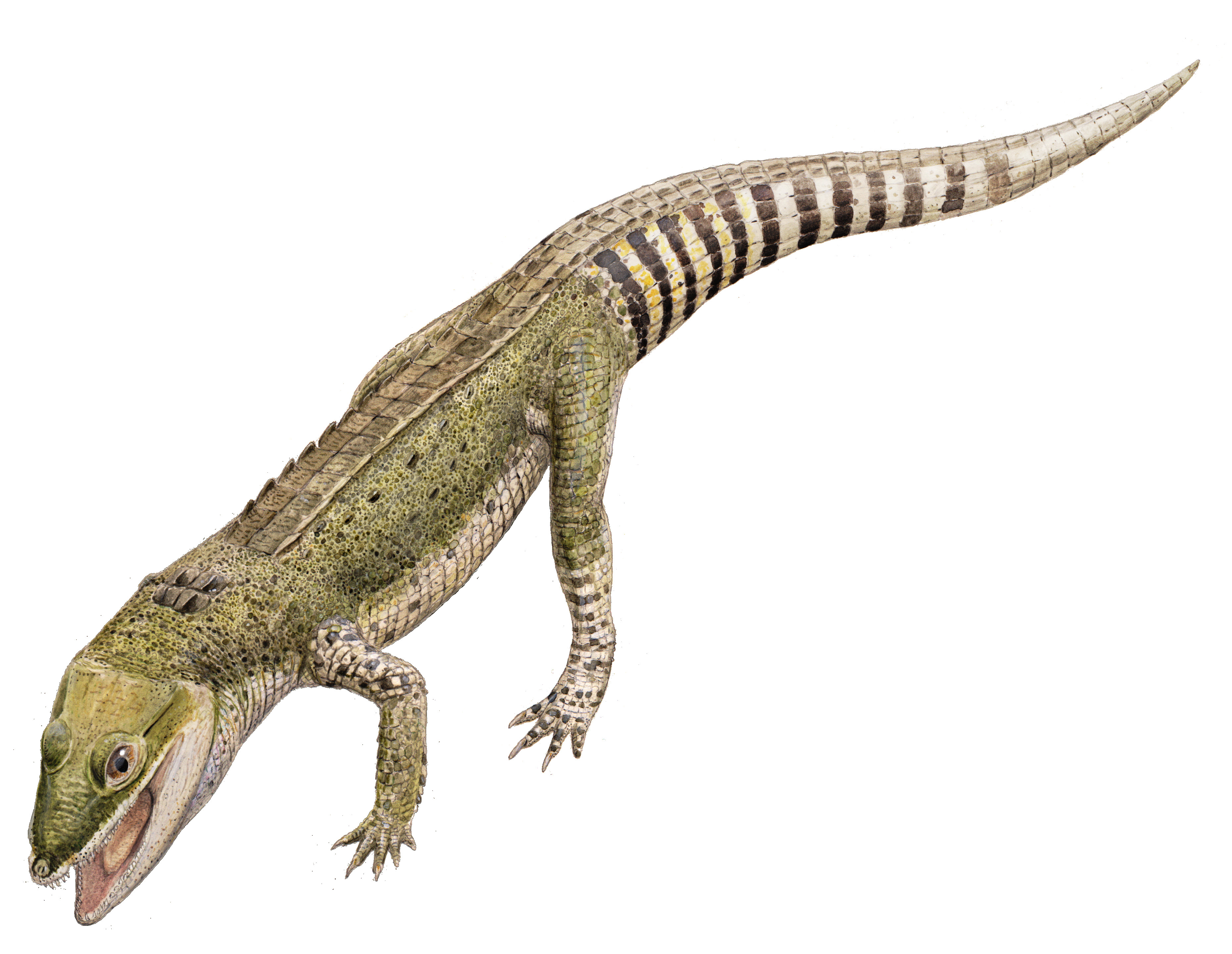
- Life restoration of Knoetschkesuchus

Scientific classification
- Kingdom: Animalia
- Phylum: Chordata
- Class: Reptilia
- Clade: Archosauria
- Clade: Pseudosuchia
- Clade: Crocodylomorpha
- Clade: Eusuchia
- Family: †Atoposauridae; Gervais, 1871

Genera
- †Alligatorellus; †Alligatorium; †Aprosuchus; †Atoposaurus; †Knoetschkesuchus; †Montsecosuchus?; †Ogresuchus?; †Theriosuchus?; †Varanosuchus

Synonyms
- Alligatorellidae Tornier, 1933

= Atoposauridae =

Atoposauridae Temporal range: Middle Jurassic–Late Cretaceous

Extinct family of reptiles

Atoposauridae is an extinct family of neosuchian crocodyliforms, known from the Jurassic and Cretaceous of Eurasia. Characterised by their small size and their heterodont (having multiple tooth types) dentition, they are thought to have lived in terrestrial and semi-aquatic environments, and to have consumed small prey such as fish, insects and mammals. The oldest records of the group are known from the Middle Jurassic of Britain. The majority of the family are known from Late Jurassic to Early Cretaceous deposits in France, Portugal, and Bavaria in southern Germany. The discovery of the genus Aprosuchus, however, extends the duration of the lineage to the end of the Cretaceous in Europe.

== Classification ==
Atoposaurids are universally considered members of Neosuchia. Tennant et al. (2016) in their revision of the group, found atoposaurids to be basal neosuchians, and the group as traditionally defined to be paraphyletic with respect to Paralligatoridae, restricting Atoposauridae to only include the genera Alligatorium, Alligatorellus and Atoposaurus. However Schwarz et al, (2017) found the traditional Atoposauridae as a whole to be monophyletic and the sister group to Paralligatoridae within the Eusuchia. A similar result was found by Pochat-Cottilloux et al (2024).

=== Phylogeny ===
Cladogram modified from Buscalioni and Sanz (1988) and Buscalioni and Sanz (1990):

- Atoposauridae
  - - Alligatorium
    - Alligatorellus
    - Atoposaurus
  - - Montsecosuchus
    - Theriosuchus
