= Sabresuchus =

Sabresuchus Temporal range: Cretaceous

Scientific classification
- Kingdom: Animalia
- Phylum: Chordata
- Class: Reptilia
- Clade: Archosauria
- Clade: Pseudosuchia
- Clade: Crocodylomorpha
- Family: †Paralligatoridae
- Genus: †Sabresuchus; Tennant et al., 2016

Species
- S. ibericus (Brinkmann, 1992) (type); S. sympiestodon (Martin et al., 2010)

Extinct genus of reptiles

Sabresuchus is an extinct genus of neosuchian crocodyliform from the Cretaceous of Europe. The name is derived from 'Sabre' in reference to the enlarged and curved fifth maxillary tooth, and 'suchus' from the Ancient Greek for crocodile.

== Taxonomy ==
Two valid species are currently recognized: Sabresuchus ibericus from eastern Spain, and Sabresuchus sympiestodon from Romania,. Both species were previously assigned under the genus Theriosuchus, as T. ibericus and T. sympiestodon respectively. A 2016 cladistic analysis recovered it as a neosuchian more closely related to members of the family Paralligatoridae than to atoposaurids.
