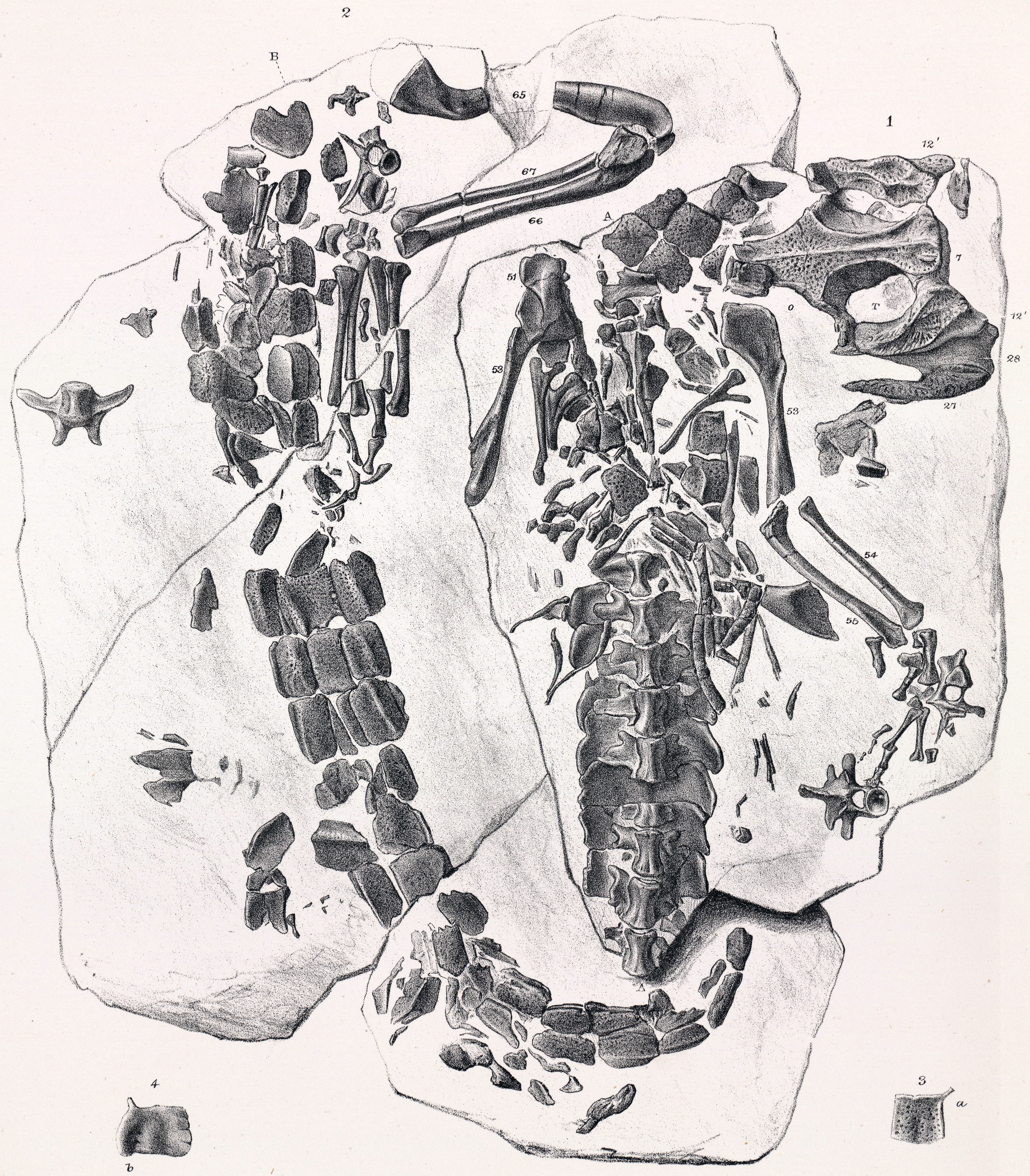
- Illustration of the lectotype specimen of Theriosuchus pusillus (NHMUK PV OR 48216) as presented by Owen (1879). The specimen is in the collections of the Natural History Museum, London.

Scientific classification
- Kingdom: Animalia
- Phylum: Chordata
- Class: Reptilia
- Clade: Pseudosuchia
- Clade: Crocodylomorpha
- Clade: Neosuchia
- Clade: Eusuchia
- Family: †Atoposauridae
- Genus: †Theriosuchus; Owen, 1879

Species
- T. pusillus Owen, 1879 (type); T. grandinaris Lauprasert et al., 2011; T. morrisonensis Foster, 2018

= Theriosuchus =

Theriosuchus Temporal range: Late Jurassic - Early Cretaceous, 145.5–140.2 Ma

Extinct genus of reptiles

Theriosuchus is an extinct genus of atoposaurid neosuchian from Late Jurassic to Early Cretaceous of Europe (Hungary & southern England), Southeast Asia (Thailand) and western North America (Wyoming), with fragmentary records from Middle Jurassic and Early Cretaceous sites in China, Morocco, and Scotland.

== Taxonomy ==
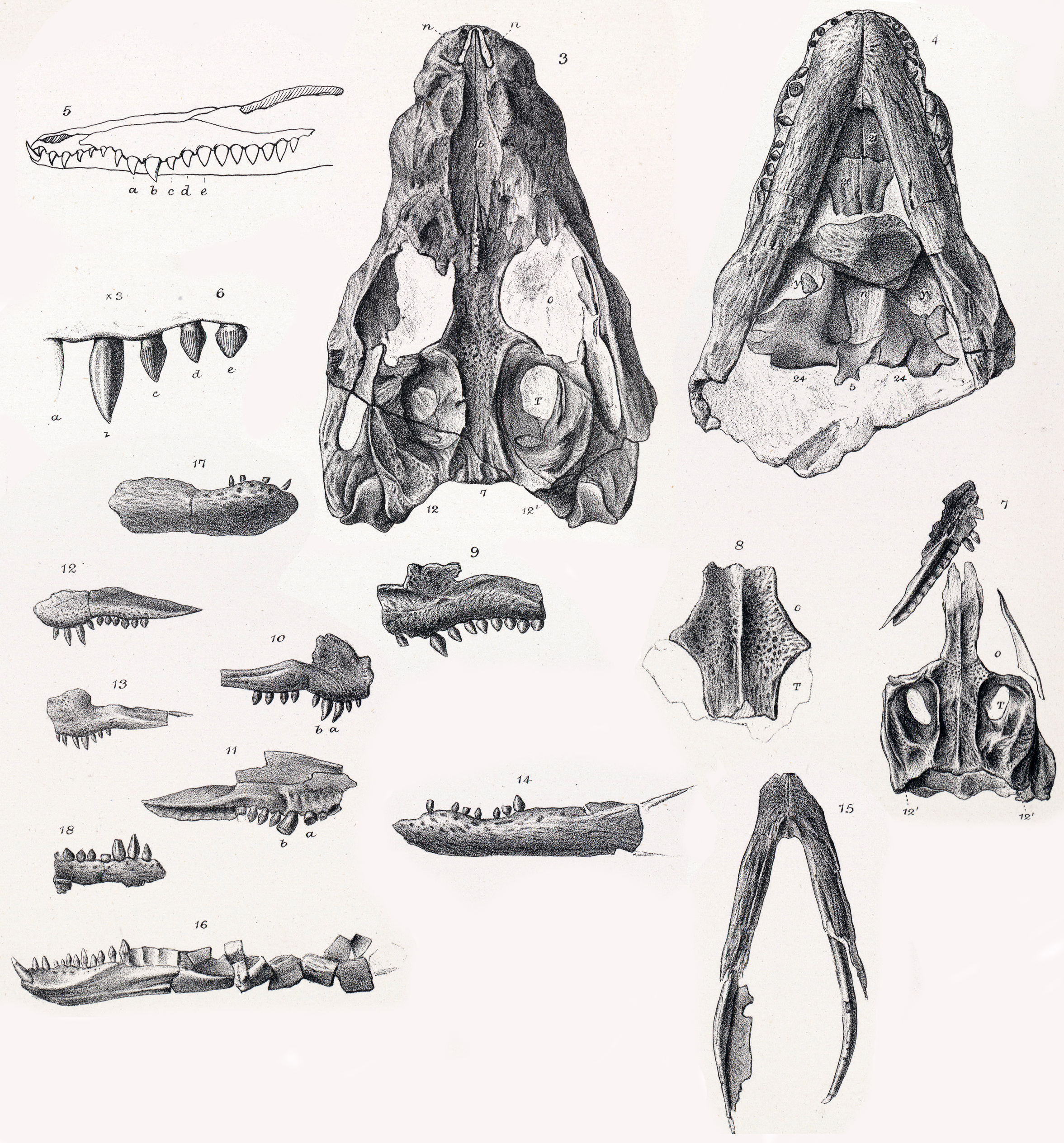
Skull elements of T. pusillus

Three valid species are currently recognized: Theriosuchus pusillus from southern England, T. grandinaris from Thailand, and T. morrisonensis from the Morrison Formation of North America. Theriosuchus was previously assigned to Atoposauridae, but a 2016 cladistic analysis recovered it as a neosuchian more closely related to members of the family Paralligatoridae than to atoposaurids.

Two species previously assigned to this genus, Theriosuchus ibericus and T. symplesiodon, have been reassigned to the new genus Sabresuchus. On the other hand, Theriosuchus guimarotae from Portugal has been reassigned to Knoetschkesuchus.
