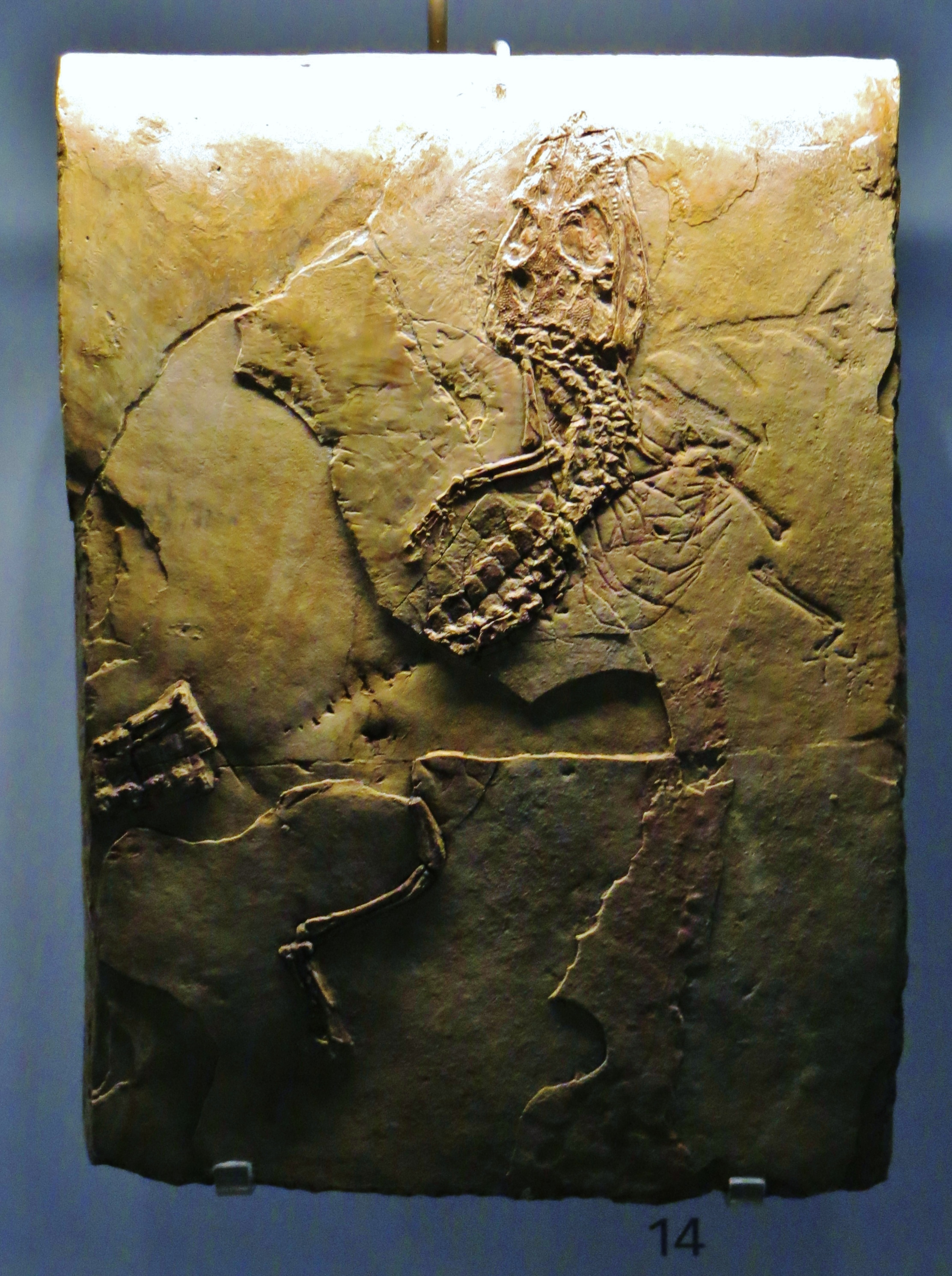
- A. meyeri fossil

Scientific classification
- Domain: Eukaryota
- Kingdom: Animalia
- Phylum: Chordata
- Class: Reptilia
- Clade: Archosauria
- Clade: Pseudosuchia
- Clade: Crocodylomorpha
- Clade: Crocodyliformes
- Family: †Atoposauridae
- Genus: †Alligatorium; Gervais, 1871

Species
- A. meyeri Gervais, 1871 (type)

= Alligatorium =

Alligatorium Temporal range: Kimmeridgian-early Tithonian, 157.3–152.3 Ma

Extinct genus of reptiles

Alligatorium is an extinct genus of atoposaurid crocodylomorph from Late Jurassic marine deposits in France.

== Systematics ==
The type species is A. meyeri, named in 1871 from a single specimen from Cerin, eastern France. Two more nominal species, A. franconicum, named in 1906, and A paintenense, named in 1961, are based on now-missing specimens from Bavaria, southern Germany, and were synonymized into a single species, for which A. franconicum has priority. A 2016 review of Atoposauridae removed A. franconicum from Alligatorium and placed at Neosuchia incertae sedis.

Alligatorium depereti, described in 1915, was reassigned to its own genus, Montsecosuchus, in 1988.
