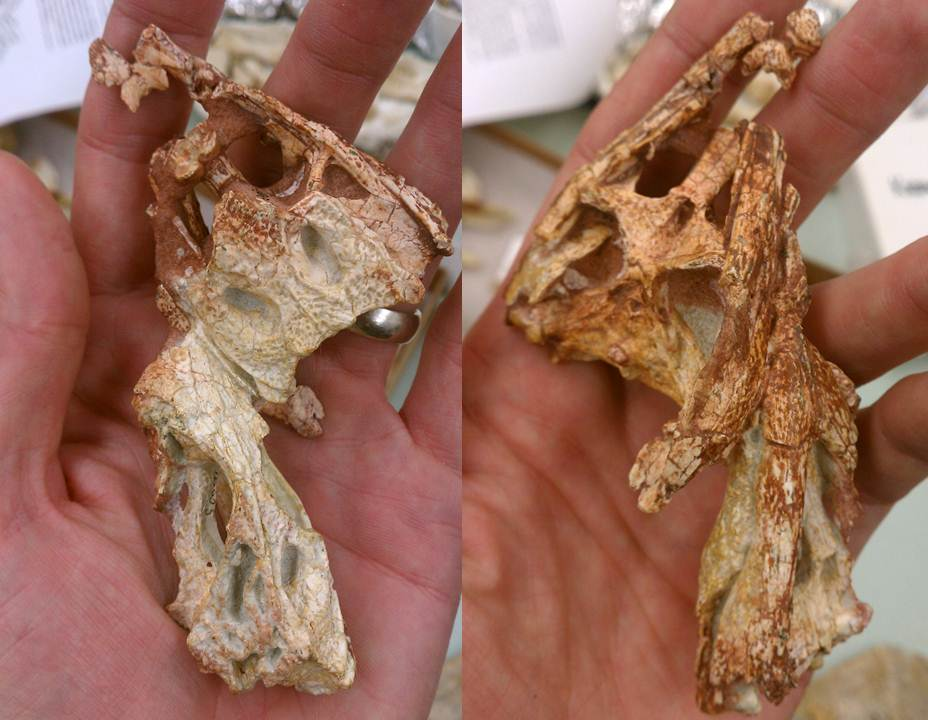
- Skulls of Wannchampsus

Scientific classification
- Kingdom: Animalia
- Phylum: Chordata
- Class: Reptilia
- Clade: Pseudosuchia
- Clade: Crocodylomorpha
- Clade: Metasuchia
- Clade: Neosuchia
- Family: †Wannchampsidae; Allen et al., 2025

Type genus
- †Wannchampsus Adams, 2014

Genera
- †Thikarisuchus; †Wannchampsus

= Wannchampsidae =

Wannchampsids Temporal range: Cretaceous (Aptian–Cenomanian)

Family of extinct crocodyliforms

Wannchampsidae is an extinct family of neosuchian crocodyliforms known from the mid-Cretaceous of the United States. The family includes the genera Thikarisuchus (Blackleaf Formation, Montana), and Wannchampsus Twin Mountains Formation, Texas), as well as the unnamed 'Glen Rose form' (Antlers Formation, Texas, and Cloverly Formation, Montana).

== Classification ==
In their phylogenetic analysis, Allen et al. (2025) recovered Thikarisuchus as a member of an unresolved clade also including Wannchampsus and an unnamed specimen nicknamed the 'Glen Rose form' (USNM 22039). The authors named this clade Wannchampsidae. This group is the sister taxon to Atoposauridae, which is in turn the sister to Paralligatoridae. It is phylogenetically defined as "all taxa more closely related to Wannchampsus kirpachi than to Theriosuchus pusillus or Shamosuchus djadochtaensis." These results are displayed in the cladogram below:

- Neosuchia
  - Other †neosuchians
  - - †Hylaeochampsidae
    - - Crocodylia
      - - †Bernissartia
        - - †Paralligatoridae
          - - †Atoposauridae
            - †Wannchampsidae
              - †Thikarisuchus
              - †Wannchampsus
              - †'Glen Rose form' (USNM 22039)
