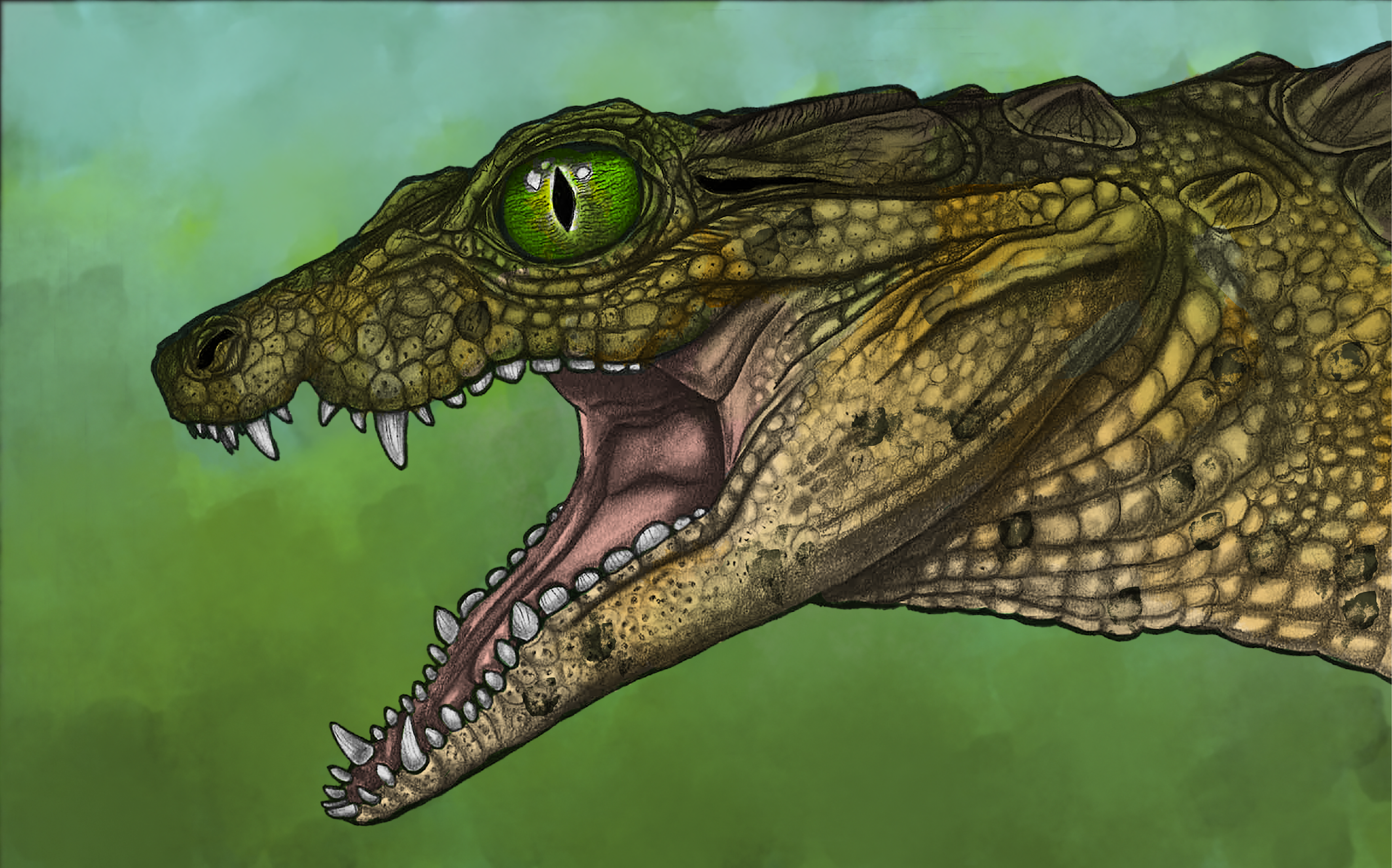
- Speculative life restoration of the head of Thikarisuchus

Scientific classification
- Kingdom: Animalia
- Phylum: Chordata
- Class: Reptilia
- Clade: Pseudosuchia
- Clade: Crocodylomorpha
- Family: †Wannchampsidae
- Genus: †Thikarisuchus; Allen et al., 2025
- Species: †T. xenodentes

Binomial name
- †Thikarisuchus xenodentes Allen et al., 2025

= Thikarisuchus =

Thikarisuchus Temporal range: early Late Cretaceous, Cenomanian

Genus of extinct crocodyliforms

Thikarisuchus (meaning "sheath crocodile") is an extinct genus of neosuchian crocodyliforms known from the Late Cretaceous (Cenomanian age) Blackleaf Formation of Montana, United States. The genus contains a single species, Thikarisuchus xenodentes, known from a nearly complete skull and partial skeleton in addition to isolated cranial bones. Thikarisuchus is the second novel vertebrate named from this formation, after the burrowing thescelosaurid dinosaur Oryctodromeus.

== Discovery and naming ==
The Thikarisuchus holotype specimen, MOR 11969 (nicknamed 'Elton'), was discovered in 2021 in outcrops of the Blackleaf Formation (Vaughn Member, 'BL-1083 Blackleaf BL-9' site) near Lima in southwest Montana. The specimen consists of most of the skull, a cervical (neck) vertebra, several dorsal (back) and caudal (tail) vertebrae, ribs, part of the pectoral and pelvic girdle, bones of the fore- and hindlimbs, and osteoderms. Two isolated cranial bones—a jugal and a fragment of a mandible—were also referred to Thikarisuchus.

In 2025, Allen and colleagues described Thikarisuchus xenodentes as a new genus and species of crocodyliform based on these fossil remains. The generic name, Thikarisuchus, combines the modern Greek words thikari (the diminutive form of thiki, meaning "sheath", referencing the way in which the maxilla teeth in the back of the jaw are 'sheathed' by a longitudinal groove on the dentary when the mouth is closed) and "suchus" (the Latinized version of soukhos, meaning "crocodile"). The specific name, xenodentes, combines the Greek words xeno, meaning "strange", and dentes, meaning "teeth", in reference to the combination of unusual tooth morphologies seen in the taxon.

== Description ==
The Thikarisuchus holotype belongs to a small crocodyliform, with a skull length of about 5.5 centimetres (2.2 in). The lack of fusion between respective neural arches and centra indicates the specimen was immature (not fully grown) when it died. An isolated fragment of the dentary referred to Thikarisuchus, MOR 11969–3, belongs to an individual about twice as large as the holotype. Its skull bears heterodont dentition, with three distinct morphotypes of teeth: (1) subconical and slightly compressed teeth seen in the premaxilla and first three maxilla teeth, the largest of which is classified as caniniform, and the first through fourth dentary teeth, (2) lanceolate and strongly compressed teeth present in the fourth through sixth maxilla positions and the fifth through eleventh dentary positions, and (3) ovular, rounded teeth with apices oriented horizontally, present in the seventh through eleventh maxilla positions and twelfth through sixteenth dentary positions.

== Ecology ==
Thikarisuchus may have used its anterior dentition to prey upon multituberculates or the hatchlings and young of Oryctodromeus. It may have used its posterior dentition to either process prey captured by the anterior dentition or to eat plant material or insects.

== Classification ==
In their phylogenetic analysis, Allen et al. (2025) recovered Thikarisuchus as a member of an unresolved clade also including Wannchampsus and an unnamed specimen nicknamed the 'Glen Rose form' (USNM 22039). The authors named this clade Wannchampsidae. This group is the sister taxon to Atoposauridae, which is in turn the sister to Paralligatoridae. The results are displayed in the cladogram below:

- Neosuchia
  - Other †neosuchians
  - - †Hylaeochampsidae
    - - Crocodylia
      - - †Bernissartia
        - - †Paralligatoridae
          - - †Atoposauridae
            - †Wannchampsidae
              - †Thikarisuchus
              - †Wannchampsus
              - †'Glen Rose form' (USNM 22039)
