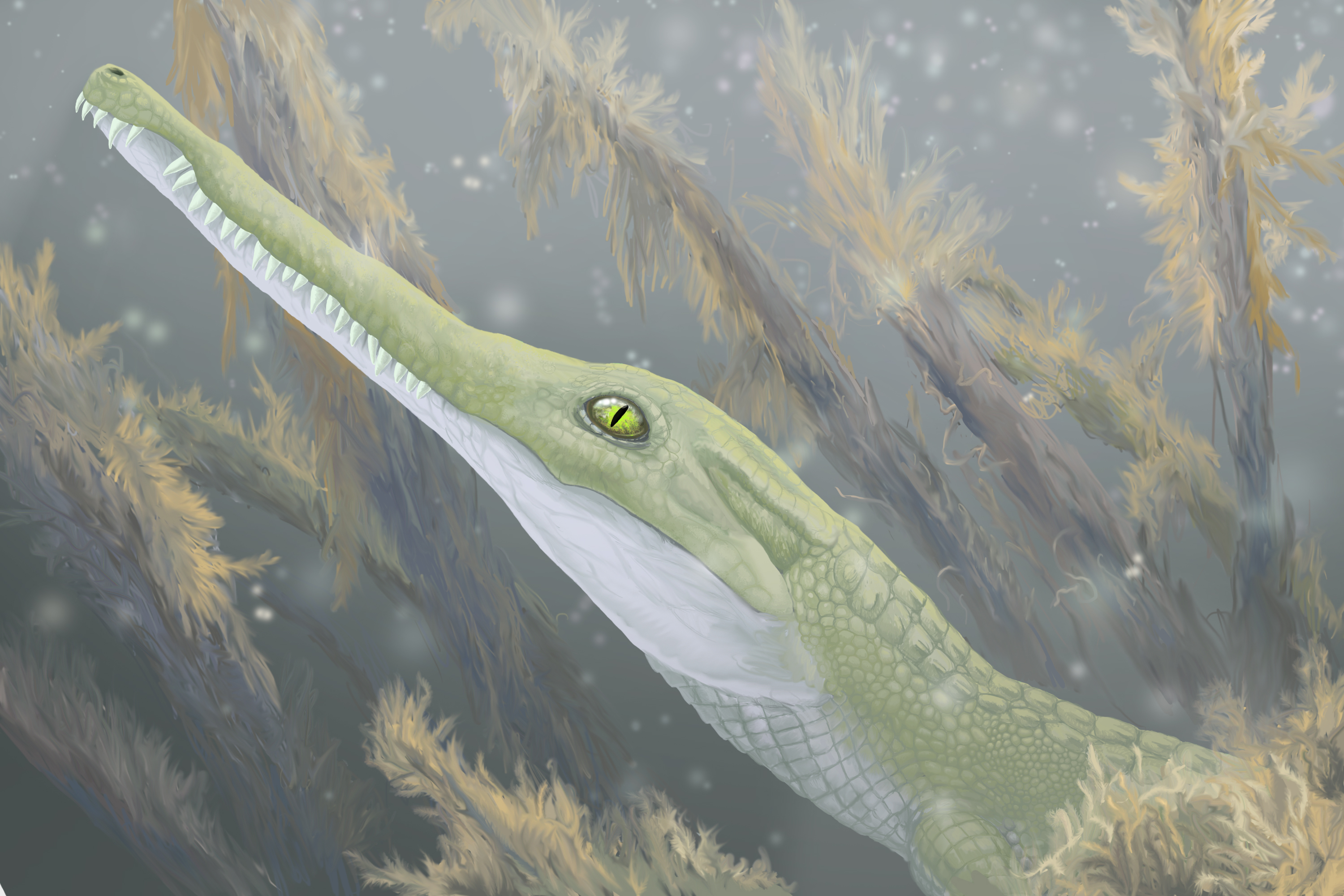
- Life restoration of Batrachomimus pastosbonensis

Scientific classification
- Domain: Eukaryota
- Kingdom: Animalia
- Phylum: Chordata
- Class: Reptilia
- Clade: Archosauria
- Clade: Pseudosuchia
- Clade: Crocodylomorpha
- Clade: Crocodyliformes
- Family: †Paralligatoridae
- Genus: †Batrachomimus; Montefeltro et al., 2013

Type species
- †Batrachomimus pastosbonensis Montefeltro et al., 2013

= Batrachomimus =

Batrachomimus Temporal range: Late Jurassic, 161–151 Ma

Extinct genus of reptiles

Batrachomimus is an extinct genus of neosuchian crocodyliform known from the Late Jurassic Pastos Bons Formation of northeastern Brazil. It contains a single species, Batrachomimus pastosbonensis, with the specific name referring to the formation, which was first described and named by Felipe C. Montefeltro, Hans C. E. Larsson, Marco A. G. de França and Max C. Langer in 2013. It is known from a nearly complete skull, osteoderms and limb bones. Batrachomimus belongs to the family Paralligatoridae and predates all other members of the family and its immediate sister group, Eusuchia, by 30 million years.

== Description ==
Batrachomimus is known from a single holotype skull known as LPRP/USP-0617, which preserves most of the skull and lower jaws except for the skull table, braincase, and the left temporal region. The skull is about 20 cm long (7.9 in), giving an estimated total body length of about 1 m (3.3 ft). Batrachomimus has a narrow snout with wavy margins around the teeth. It is unique in having a smooth area of bone on the maxilla, near the back of the snout; most crocodyliforms have heavy pitting covering the entire upper surface of the skull, including all of the maxilla. Another unique feature or autapomorphy of Batrachomimus is the hourglass-shape of its choanae, which are two holes on the underside of the skull that are openings for the nasal passages. Other distinguishing features of Batrachomimus are its lack of antorbital and mandibular fenestrae (holes in front of the eyes and at the back of the lower jaw, respectively), and a backward extension of the premaxilla bone on the snout to the level of the fifth tooth of the maxilla bone behind it.

== Etymology ==
The genus name "Batrachomimus" means "batrachian mimic" in Greek, a reference to the holotype specimen originally being identified as that of a temnospondyl, a type of prehistoric amphibian that vaguely resembles modern batrachians (frogs and toads). In addition to being considered a temnospondyl, the holotype was thought to have come from the Pedra de Fogo Formation, which dates back to the Permian, a time when temnospondyls were the dominant form of large semi-aquatic animals. The genus name also alludes to crocodyliforms replacing temnospondyls as semi-aquatic predators during the Jurassic.

== Phylogeny ==
The phylogenetic analysis of Montefeltro et al. (2013) placed Batrachomimus as the most basal member of the group Paralligatoridae, which also includes the genera Shamosuchus and Rugosuchus from the Cretaceous of Asia. Below is a cladogram showing the results of the analysis:

- Mesoeucrocodylia
  - Thalattosuchia
  - Metasuchia
    - Notosuchia
    - Neosuchia
      - - Khoratosuchus jintasakuli
        - Tethysuchia
      - - Theriosuchus
        - - Goniopholididae
          - - Bernissartia fagesii
            - - Paralligatoridae
                - Batrachomimus pastosbonensis
                - - Shamosuchus spp.
                  - Rugosuchus nonganensis
              - Eusuchia
                - Susisuchus anatoceps
                - Hylaeochampsa vectiana
                - - Allodaposuchus precedens
                  - Hylaeochampsidae
                    - Pietraroiasuchus ormezzanoi
                    - Iharkutosuchus makadii
                  - - Isisfordia duncani
                    - Crocodylia
