= Pastos Bons Formation =

Geologic formation in Brazil

- Stratigraphic range: Late Jurassic (Oxfordian–Kimmeridgian), ~161–151 Ma
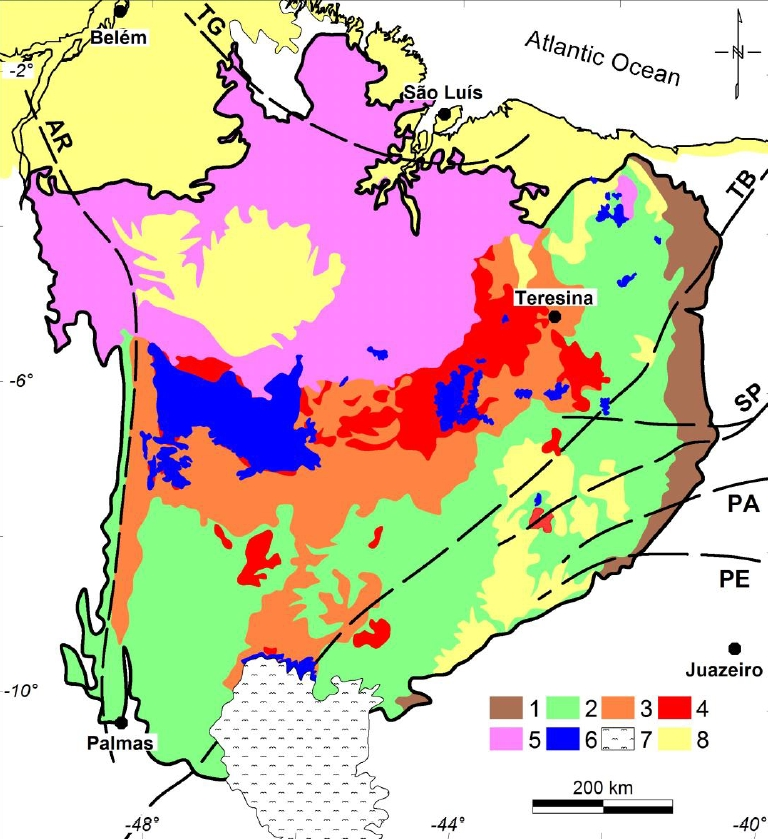
- Geologic map of the Parnaíba Basin with the Jurassic in red
- Type: Geological formation
- Underlies: Mosquitos Formation
- Overlies: Sardinha Formation

Lithology
- Primary: Sandstone
- Other: Shale

Location
- Coordinates: 6.1°S 44.7°W
- Approximate paleocoordinates: 2.4°S 12.1°W
- Region: Maranhão
- Country: Brazil
- Extent: Parnaíba Basin

Type section
- Named for: Pastos Bons
- Pastos Bons Formation (Brazil)

The Pastos Bons Formation is a Late Jurassic (Oxfordian to Kimmeridgian) geologic formation of the Parnaíba Basin in Maranhão, northeastern Brazil. The formation forms part of the sag phase of the basin. It overlies the Sardinha Formation and is overlain by the Mosquito Formation. The fluvial to lacustrine sandstones and shales have provided fossils of a coelacanth fish, Parnaibaia maranhaoensis and a paralligatorid named after the formation, Batrachomimus pastosbonensis.

== Fossil content ==
The following fossils were reported from the formation:

Color key: Taxon / Reclassified taxon / Taxon falsely reported as present / Dubious taxon or junior synonym / Ichnotaxon / Ootaxon / Morphotaxon

Notes
Uncertain or tentative taxa are in small text
~~crossed out~~ taxa are discredited.

=== Crocodylomorphs ===
Crocodylomorphs of the Pasto Bons Formation
Genus	Species	Location	Stratigraphic position	Material	Notes	Images
Batrachomimus	B. pastosbonensis				A paralligatorid neosuchian	

=== Fish ===
Fishes of the Pasto Bons Formation
Genus	Species	Location	Stratigraphic position	Material	Notes	Images
Lophionotus	L. parnaibensis				A semionotid fish	
Parnaibaia	P. maranhaoensis				A mawsoniid coelacanth	
Quasimodichthys	Q. piauhyensis				A semionotiform fish	

=== Plants ===
Plants of the Pasto Bons Formation
Genus	Species	Location	Stratigraphic position	Material	Notes	Images
Araucariaceae indet.	Indeterminate					

== See also ==
- Takutu Formation, contemporaneous formation of northern Brazil and Guyana
