= Blackleaf Formation =

Geologic formation in the United States

- Stratigraphic range: late Albian-Cenomanian; ~105–94 Ma
- Type: Formation
- Unit of: Colorado Group

Lithology
- Primary: Mudstone, sandstone
- Other: Shale, siltstone

Location
- Coordinates: 44.5°N 112.6°W
- Approximate paleocoordinates: 45.9°N 72.3°W
- Region: Montana
- Country: United States
- Blackleaf Formation (the United States) Blackleaf Formation (Montana)

The Blackleaf Formation is a geologic formation in Montana. It preserves fossils dating back to the Albian to Cenomanian stages of the Cretaceous period.

== Description ==
The formation comprises an isolated, sinuous sandstone body sitting within and crosscutting a succession of three mudrock units. The lowermost mudstone is greater than 35 cm in thickness, light greenish grey and weakly calcareous. This unit exhibits extensive dark reddish grey mottling over its uppermost portion. Additionally, carbonate nodules as much as 4.5 cm in diameter form a discontinuous layer of 20–25 cm below the sharp upper contact of the unit. A dark greenish-grey claystone succeeds vertically. This 25 cm thick unit is calcareous with a platy structure and grades upwards into a greenish grey blocky mudstone with some organics. This third unit encloses the upper portion of the sedimentary structure and bears a sharp, irregular contact with an overlying burrowed dark red claystone. The lithology of the structure contrasts sharply with the surrounding host mudrock and facilitates recognition of the structure in the field.

The lower, bone-bearing portion consists of 25–30 cm of medium to fine, calcareous greenish-grey sandstone, moderately sorted with abundant plagioclase and other volcanogenic grains. Small (3–6 mm), rounded mud clasts are common in the coarser basal portion. This structureless unit fines upwards with an increasing clay content. A thin, 1–2 cm thick, grey claystone separates this lower sand- stone from an upper fine sandstone. The bedding parallels that of the host mudrocks. Reduced clay content, grey colour and larger (approx. 10 mm), platy mud clasts distinguish this unit from the otherwise similar, lower sandstone. A thin (less than 1 cm) rim of tan claystone with abundant calcite veins separates the lower portion of the structure from the host mudrocks.

== Fossil content ==
The following fossils were reported from the formation:

Reptiles

- Oryctodromeus cubicularis
- Thikarisuchus xenodentes
- Bernissartia sp.
- Glyptops sp.
- Ankylosauridae indet.
- Chelydridae indet.
- Dromaeosauridae indet.
- Goniopholididae indet.
- Hadrosauridae indet.
- Testudines indet.
- Tyrannosauridae indet.

Fish

- Neopterygii indet.

Flora

- Araliaephyllum westonii
- cf. Aralia wellingtonia
- Araliopsoides cf. cretacea
- cf. Aspidophyllum trilobatum
- cf. Ficus ovatifolia
- cf. Celastrophyllum sp.
- Cinnamomoides sp.
- Nymphaeites sp.
- Platanophyllum sp.
- cf. Protophyllum sp.

== See also ==
- List of fossiliferous stratigraphic units in Montana
- Paleontology in Montana
