= Brillanceausuchus =

Brillanceausuchus Temporal range: Early Cretaceous

Scientific classification
- Domain: Eukaryota
- Kingdom: Animalia
- Phylum: Chordata
- Class: Reptilia
- Clade: Archosauria
- Clade: Pseudosuchia
- Clade: Crocodylomorpha
- Family: †Paralligatoridae
- Genus: †Brillanceausuchus; Michard, de Broin, Brunet & Hell, 1990

Type species
- †Brillanceausuchus babouriensis Michard, de Broin, Brunet & Hell, 1990

Extinct genus of reptiles

Brillanceausuchus is an extinct genus of paralligatorid crocodyliforms. Fossils have been found in Early Cretaceous–age rocks of Cameroon. The genus is notable for the position of the secondary choana within its palate. Parts of the pterygoid bones make up the rostral margin of the choana and thus separate it from the palatines, a feature also seen in the more advanced neosuchian suborder Eusuchia. This characteristic was once thought to be characteristic of Eusuchia, but its presence in Brillanceausuchus suggests that the trait is homoplasic, thus making the evolution of the position of the choana within crocodilians more complex than previously thought.
