= Scolomastax =

Scolomastax Temporal range: Late Cretaceous, Cenomanian

Scientific classification
- Domain: Eukaryota
- Kingdom: Animalia
- Phylum: Chordata
- Class: Reptilia
- Clade: Archosauria
- Clade: Pseudosuchia
- Clade: Crocodylomorpha
- Clade: Crocodyliformes
- Family: †Paralligatoridae
- Genus: †Scolomastax; Noto et al. 2019
- Species: †S. sahlsteini

Binomial name
- †Scolomastax sahlsteini Noto et al. 2019

Extinct genus of reptiles

Scolomastax is an extinct genus of paralligatorid neosuchian known from the Late Cretaceous Woodbine Formation in Texas. It contains a single species, S. sahlsteini.
