= Rugosuchus =

Rugosuchus Temporal range: Santonian-Campanian

Scientific classification
- Kingdom: Animalia
- Phylum: Chordata
- Class: Reptilia
- Clade: Archosauria
- Clade: Pseudosuchia
- Clade: Crocodylomorpha
- Family: †Paralligatoridae
- Genus: †Rugosuchus; Wu et al., 2001

Type species
- †Rugosuchus nonganensis Wu et al., 2001

Extinct genus of reptiles

Rugosuchus (meaning "uneven or wrinkled crocodile", in reference to texturing on its upper jaw bones) is an extinct genus of neosuchian crocodyliform from the Cretaceous of China. It is known from most of a skull, a partial postcranial skeleton, and a second partial skeleton including part of the hips. It was described by Xiao-Chun Wu and colleagues in 2001, with R. nonganensis as the type species. At the time of its description, it was the most complete crocodyliform from northeastern China, and only the second known.

== Description and history ==
Rugosuchus is based on IGV 33, most of a skull. Wu et al. assigned two other specimens to this genus: IGV 31, much of a skeleton lacking a skull and most of the limbs; and IGV 32, three vertebrae, a partial hip, and a fragment of thigh bone. These three specimens had been collected in 1958 by the Petroleum Geological Survey of the Song-Liao Basin, and remained unstudied for many years. The locality is near Fulongquan, Nong'an County, Jilin, in the Song-Liao Basin. The formation is not known for certain, but is probably the Nenjiang Formation. The age of the Nenjiang Formation has been debated, but as of the description of Rugosuchus was thought to be latest Early Cretaceous, based on ostracode, bivalve, and fish fossils. However, most of later studies consider it as late Cretaceous instead.

Skull IGV 33 is thought to have come from an adult, based on the fusion of bones. It is somewhat elongate, being about 28 centimeters (11 in) long but only an estimated 13 centimeters (5 in) at its widest. The maxillae, the main tooth-bearing bones of the upper jaw, had unusual elongate depressions on their sides, nine or ten per maxilla. Other skull bones had heavily textured surfaces, as is seen on other crocodyliforms. The premaxillae at the tip of the snout had five teeth each, and the maxillae 16 or 17, with wide spacing; because the jaws are closed, the teeth of the lower jaw cannot be observed.

Wu et al. noted that their new genus was not an eusuchian because of the form of the palatal bones, but it was probably more closely related to the eusuchians than other extinct crocodyliforms like Goniopholis by having more than two rows of bony armor running its length, and by the form of the armor. They interpreted Rugosuchus as similar to Bernissartia, Shamosuchus and the unnamed "Glen Rose Form", but not as derived. However, a more recent phylogenetic analysis by Turner and Buckley (2008) places it with the "Glen Rose Form" in a clade with Eusuchia, more derived than Bernissartia.
