= Pastos Bons =

Coordinates: 6.60194°S 44.0769°W

- Municipality
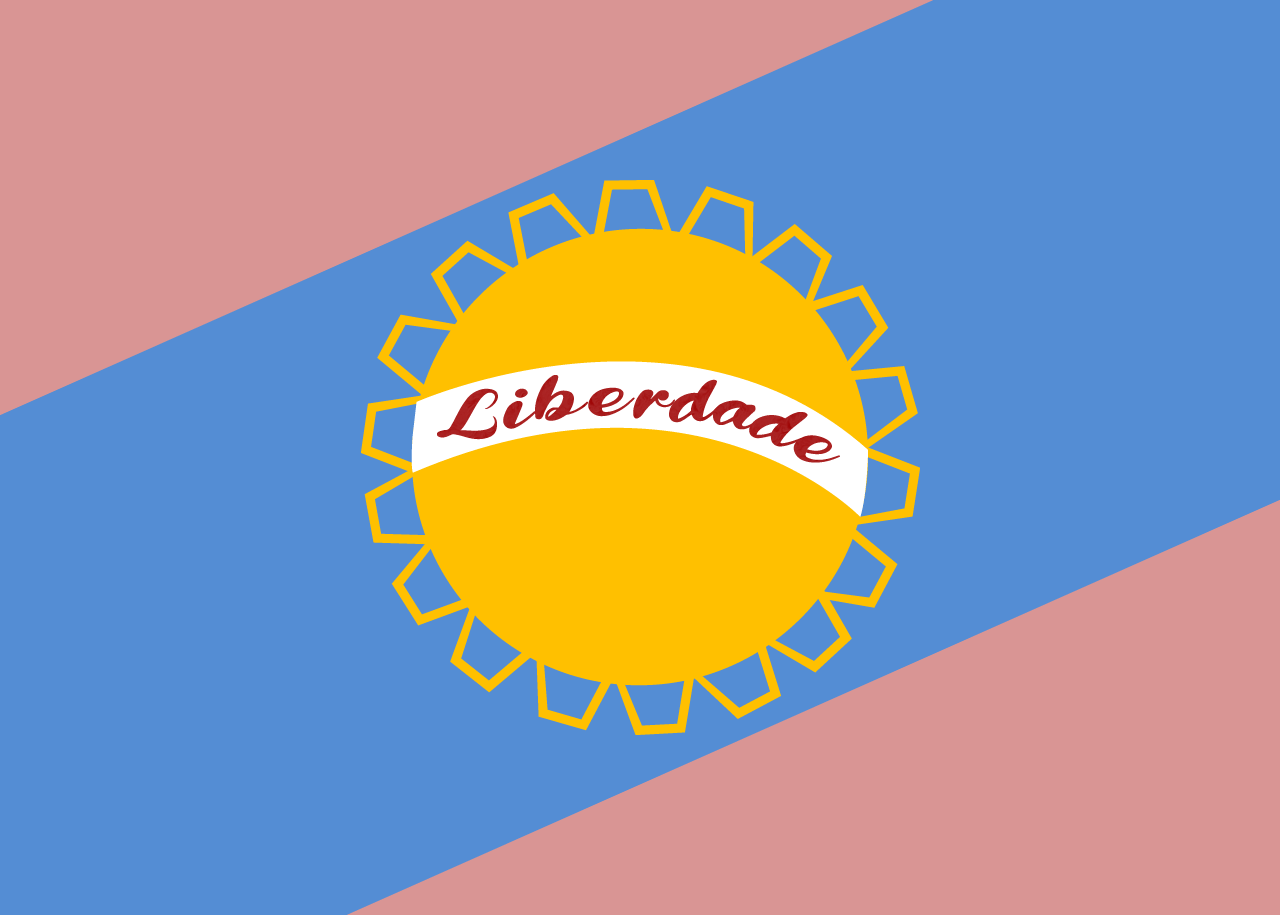
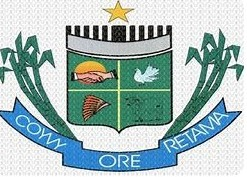
- Flag Coat of arms
- Interactive map of Pastos Bons
- Country: Brazil
- Region: Nordeste
- State: Maranhão
- Mesoregion: Leste Maranhense
- Elevation: 1,014 ft (309 m)

Population (2020)
  - Total: 19,583
- Time zone: UTC−3 (BRT)

Pastos Bons is a municipality in the state of Maranhão in the Northeast region of Brazil. It gives its name to Pastos Bons Formation and Batrachomimus pastosbonensis.

== See also ==
- List of municipalities in Maranhão
