= Tarsomordeo =

Tarsomordeo Temporal range: Early Cretaceous, Aptian

Scientific classification
- Kingdom: Animalia
- Phylum: Chordata
- Class: Reptilia
- Clade: Archosauria
- Clade: Pseudosuchia
- Clade: Crocodylomorpha
- Family: †Paralligatoridae
- Genus: †Tarsomordeo; Adams, 2019

Type species
- Tarsomordeo winkleri Adams, 2019

Extinct genus of reptiles

Tarsomordeo is an extinct genus of paralligatorid neosuchian known from the Early Cretaceous Twin Mountains Formation in Texas. It contains a single species, T. winkleri.
