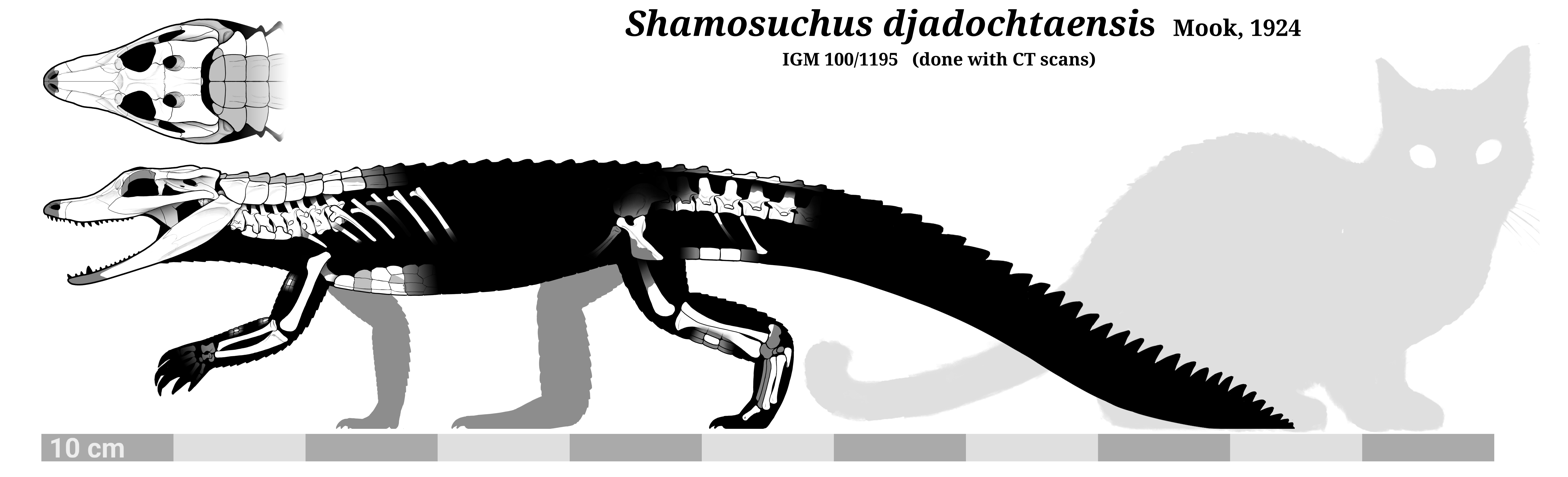
- Skeletal reconstruction of the type species, based in a referred specimen
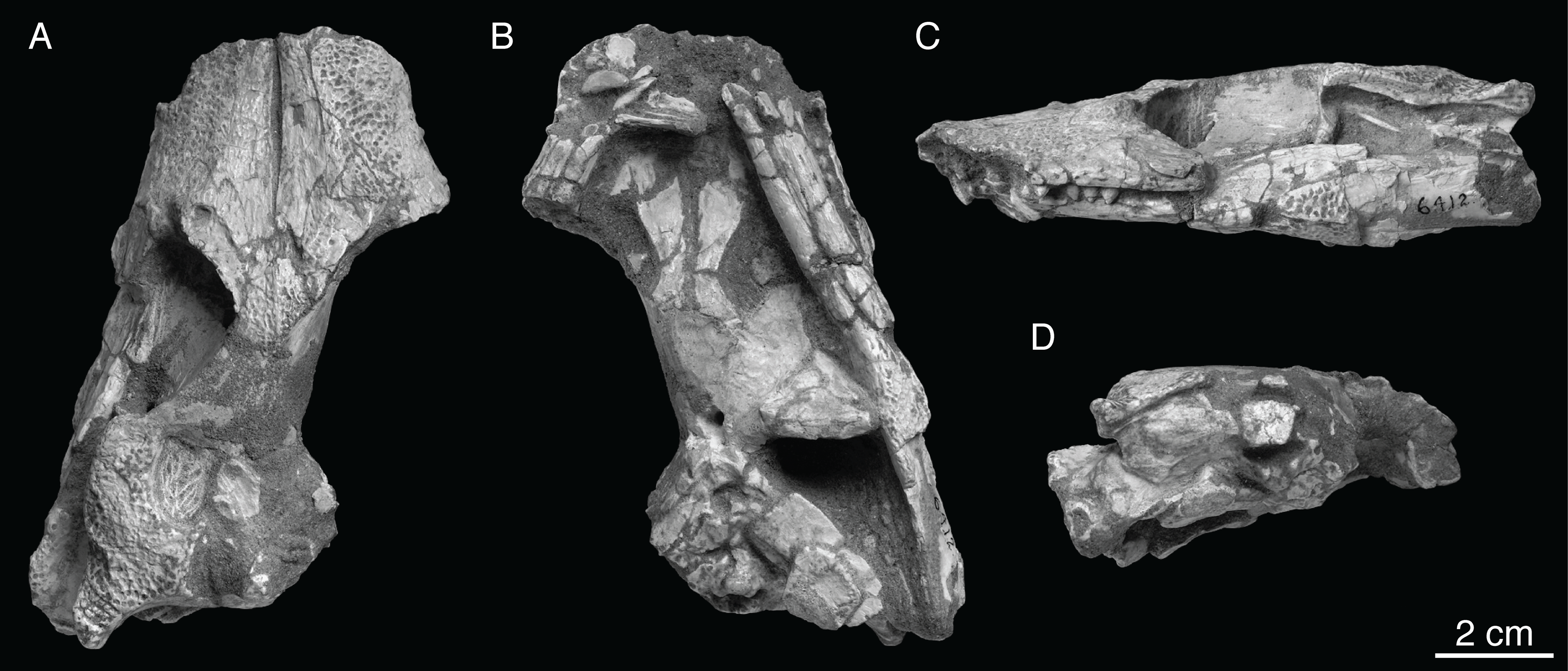
- Holotype specimen

Scientific classification
- Kingdom: Animalia
- Phylum: Chordata
- Class: Reptilia
- Clade: Archosauria
- Clade: Pseudosuchia
- Clade: Crocodylomorpha
- Clade: Neosuchia
- Family: †Paralligatoridae
- Genus: †Shamosuchus; Mook, 1924

Type species
- †Shamosuchus djadochtaensis Mook, 1924

= Shamosuchus =

Shamosuchus Temporal range: Late Cretaceous, 83.6–72.1 Ma

Extinct genus of reptiles

Shamosuchus is an extinct genus of neosuchian crocodyliform that lived during the Late Cretaceous (Campanian) period in what is now the Djadochta Formation of Mongolia, approximately 75 million to 71 million years ago.

== Description ==
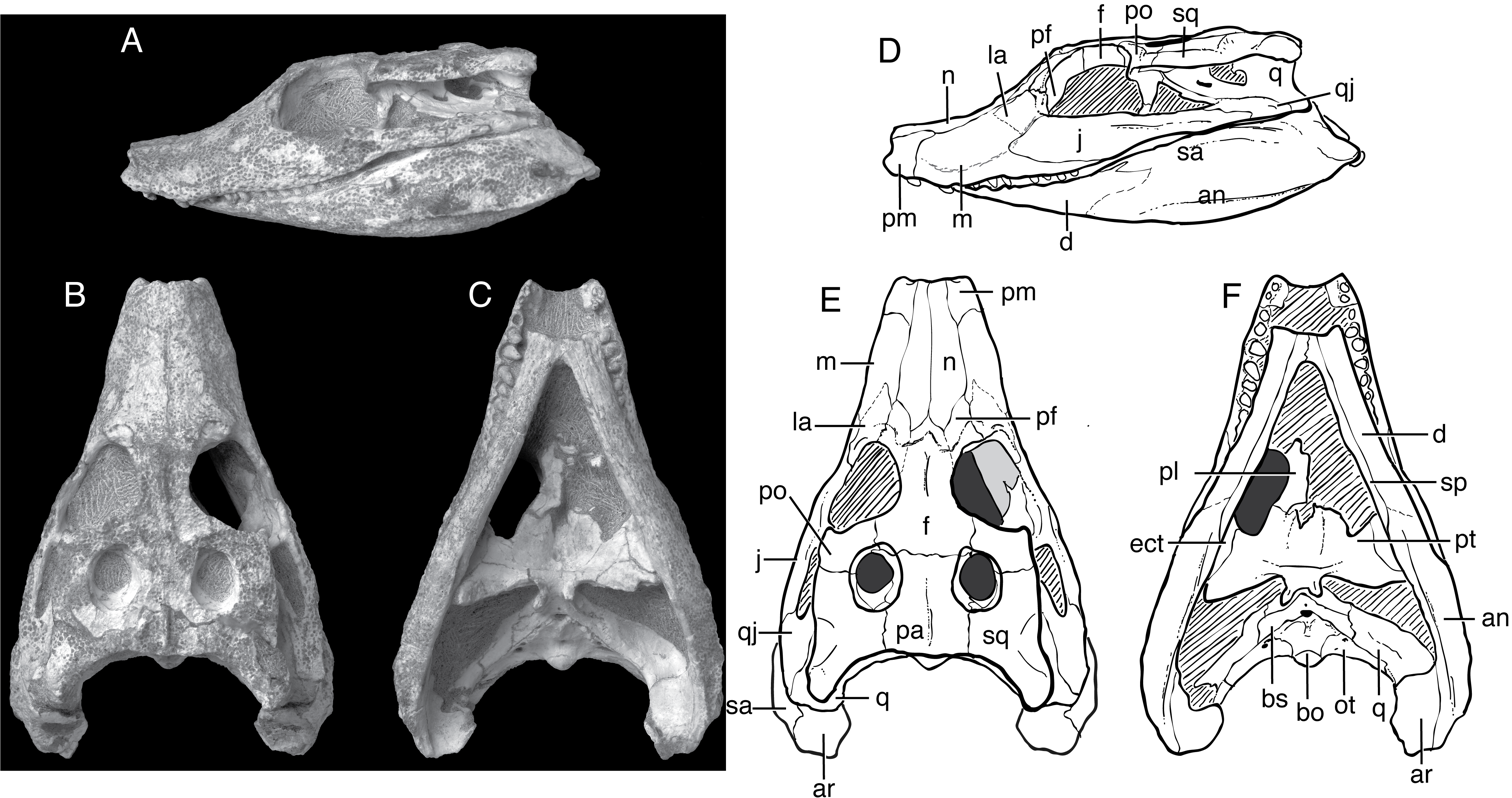

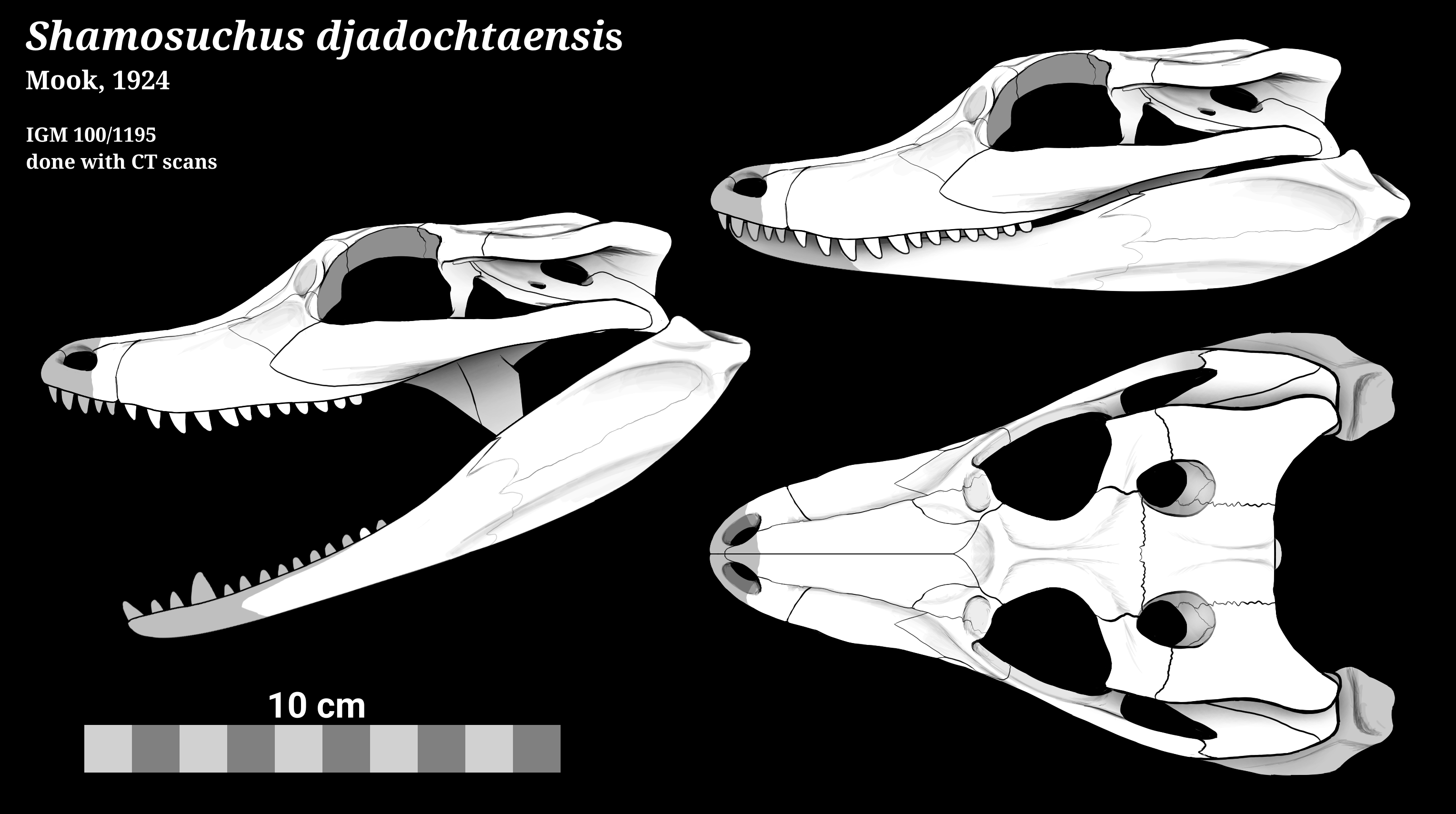
Pictures, and reconstructed diagram of a referred skull

Shamosuchus reached up to 4 m (13 ft) long and had a rostrum of moderate length. In S. djadochtaensis, a perinarial fossa extended along the ventrolateral region of the narial opening. Where the premaxilla and maxilla articulate, the alveolar margin is continuous and is characterised by the absence of a notch for receiving the opposing mandibular tooth.

== Taxonomy ==
The genus was named in 1924 by Charles C. Mook. Paralligator was synonymized with Shamosuchus by several authors. However, recent cladistic analysis of Paralligatoridae found the former genus to be distinct from the latter.

== Phylogeny ==
Below are the results of a phylogenetic analysis by Pol et al., 2009 showing the position of Shamosuchus within Neosuchia:

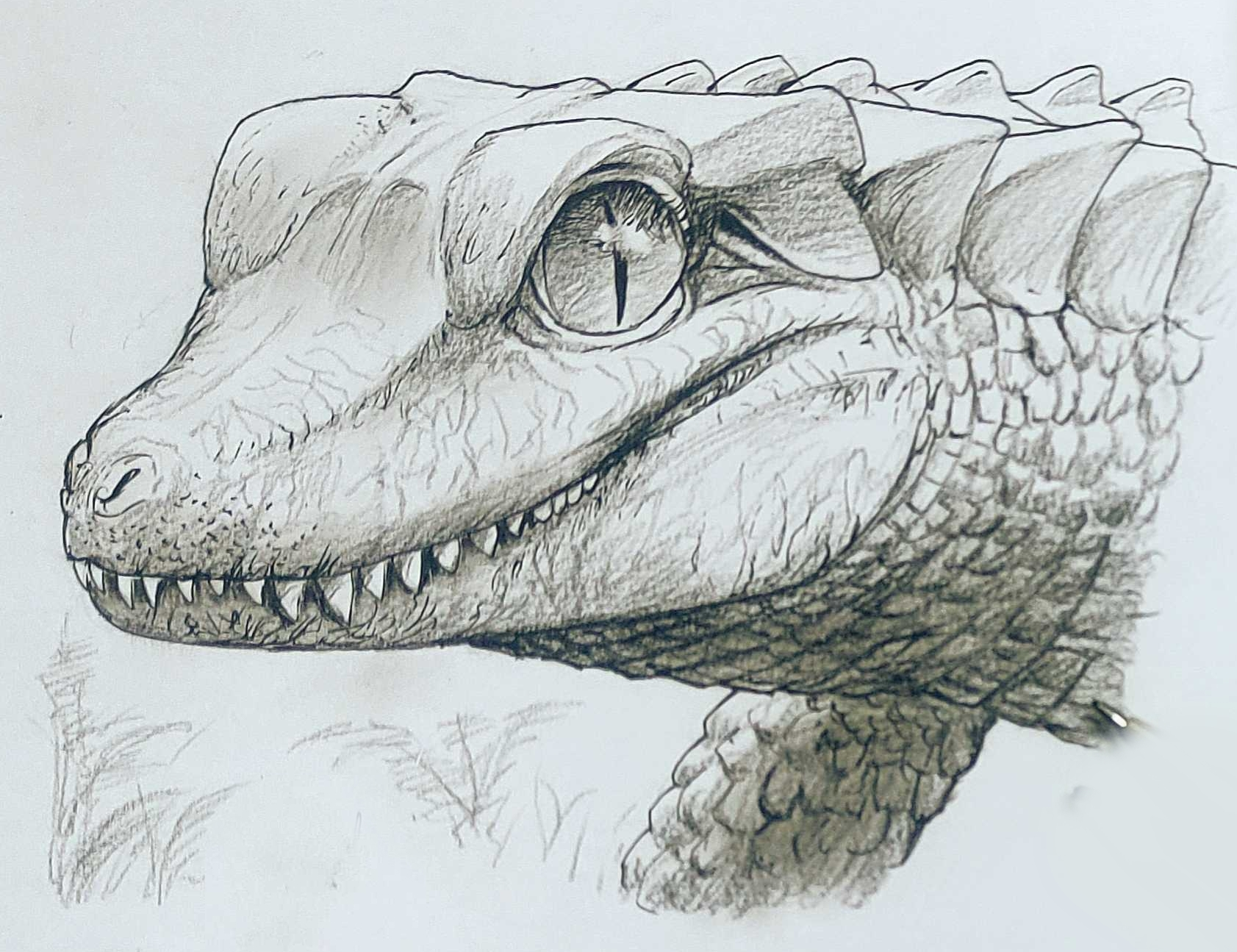
Life restoration of the type species

- Neosuchia
  - - Theriosuchus
    - Alligatorium
  - - - Goniopholis simus
      - - Goniopholis stovalli
        - Eutretauranosuchus
        - Sunosuchus
        - Calsoyasuchus
    - - - Bernissartia
        - 'Glen Rose form'
      - - - Rugosuchus
          - Shamosuchus
        - Eusuchia
          - Hylaeochampsa
          - - Borealosuchus
            - - Pristichampsus
              - Crocodylia

== Palaeobiology ==
The eye and nasal openings were not raised above the skull as in modern crocodilians, so that the animal would have to raise its head completely out of the water to breathe. As this cranial morphology does not suit an ambush predator, it lends support to the idea of a diet of aquatic invertebrates. The morphology of the teeth of Shamosuchus suggests they were adapted to crush bivalves, gastropods, and other animals with a shell or exoskeleton.
