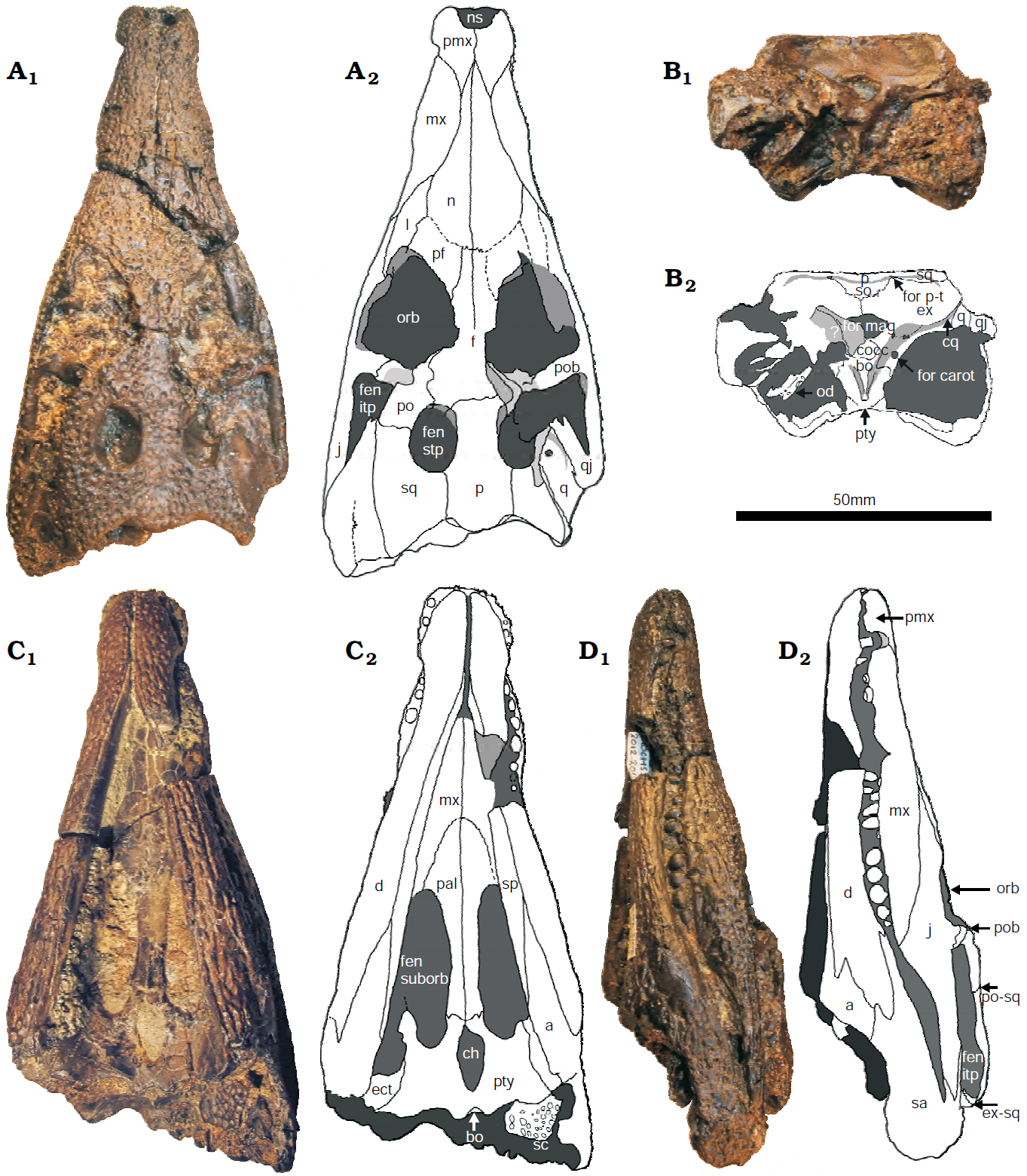
- Holotype skull

Scientific classification
- Kingdom: Animalia
- Phylum: Chordata
- Class: Reptilia
- Clade: Pseudosuchia
- Clade: Crocodylomorpha
- Clade: Metasuchia
- Clade: Neosuchia
- Family: †Bernissartiidae
- Genus: †Koumpiodontosuchus; Sweetman et al., 2015

Type species
- †Koumpiodontosuchus aprosdokiti Sweetman et al., 2015

= Koumpiodontosuchus =

Koumpiodontosuchus Temporal range: Barremian, 130–125 Ma

Extinct genus of reptiles

Koumpiodontosuchus is an extinct genus of neosuchian crocodyliform from the Early Cretaceous Wessex Formation of England. The genus contains a single species, K. aprosdokiti, named in 2015.

== Discovery ==
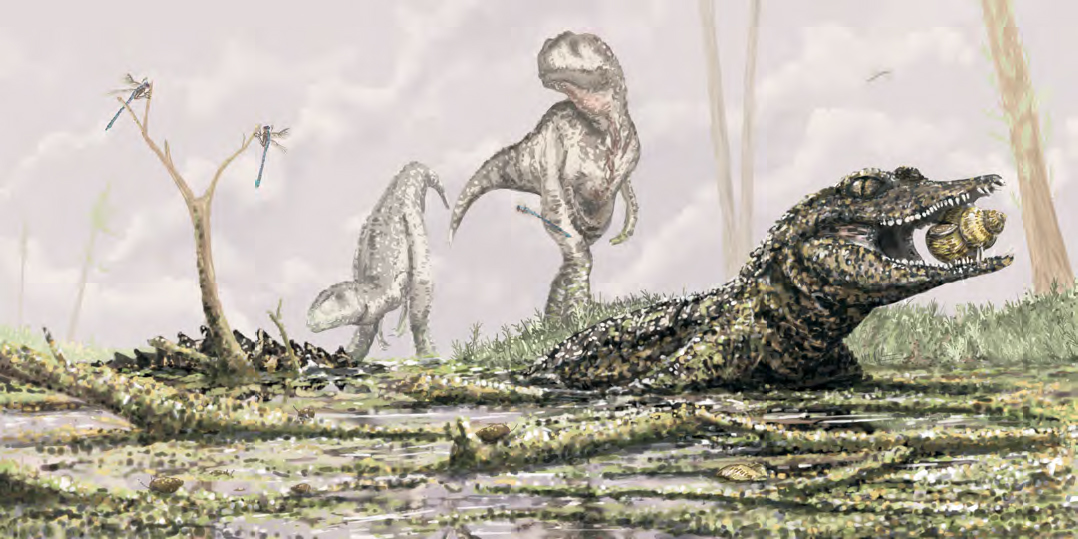
Restoration by Mark Witton of Koumpiodontosuchus feeding on the extinct snail Viviparus cariniferus

The first fossilised fragment of a skull was discovered by Diane Trevarthen on a beach near Sandown on the Isle of Wight in March 2011 and it was initially identified as a juvenile of an unknown Goniopholis species. Three months later, the second fragment of the skull was found by Austin and Finley Nathan. The two fragments were donated to Dinosaur Isle. Megan Jacobs also discovered an isolated tooth belonging to the same genus that was twice the size of those from the holotype. The species that the fragments belonged to was named Koumpiodontosuchus aprosdokiti, meaning "unexpected button-toothed crocodile".

When the fragments were first seen by Steve Sweetman, a palaeontologist with the University of Portsmouth, he thought that they belonged to the species Bernissartia fagesii because of its small size and button-shaped teeth. In 2015, Sweetman and colleagues published a paper on the discovery of the new species in Acta Palaeontologica Polonica, where they named and described it.

== Classification ==
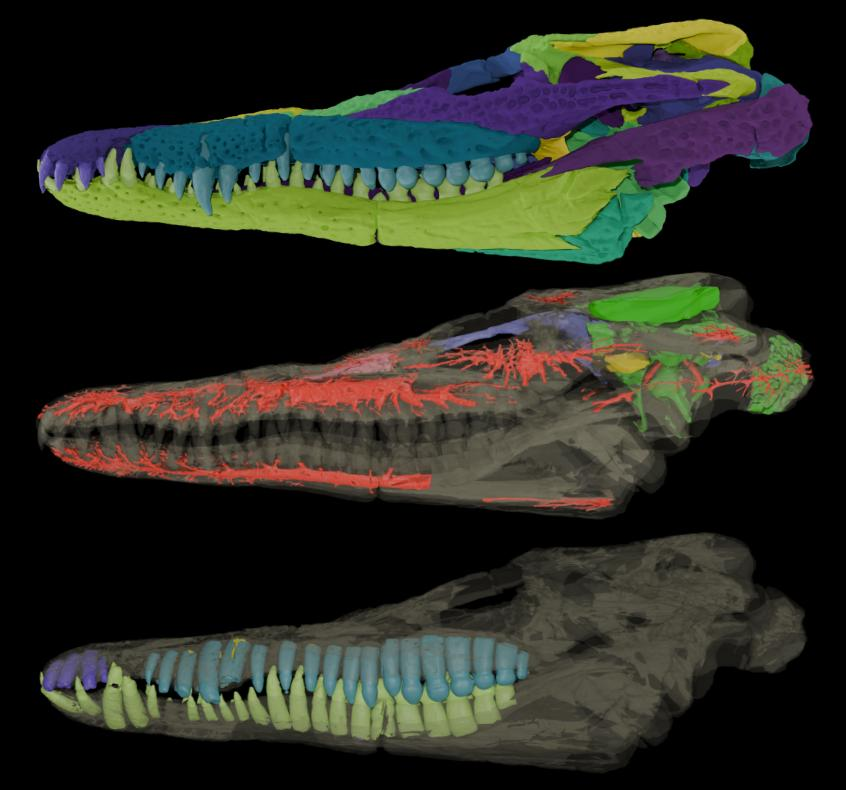
CT data of the K. aprosdokiti holotype skull

In a 2026 reassessment of Koumpiodontosuchus based on CT scans of the skull, Chris T. Barker et al. included it in a phylogenetic analysis. This placed the genus as the sister taxon to Bernissartia within the family Bernissartiidae. This group was recovered as the sister to Eusuchia. These results are summarized the cladogram below:

- - †Susisuchidae
  - - †Paralligatoridae
    - - †Bernissartiidae
        - †Bernissartia fagesii
        - †Koumpiodontosuchus aprosdokiti
      - Eusuchia
        - †Hylaeochampsidae
        - - †Allodaposuchidae
          - Crocodilia

== See also ==
- Wessex Formation
