= Yanjisuchus =

Yanjisuchus Temporal range: Albian, 101 Ma

Scientific classification
- Kingdom: Animalia
- Phylum: Chordata
- Class: Reptilia
- Clade: Archosauria
- Clade: Pseudosuchia
- Clade: Crocodylomorpha
- Family: †Paralligatoridae
- Genus: †Yanjisuchus; Rummy et al., 2022

Type species
- †Yanjisuchus longshanensis Rummy et al., 2022

Extinct genus of paralligatorid

Yanjisuchus is an extinct genus of paralligatorid neosuchian known from the Early Cretaceous Longjing Formation of Jilin, China. It contains a single species, Y. longshanensis.
