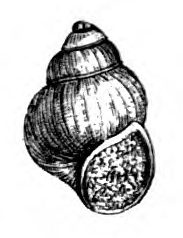
- Drawing of a shell of Viviparus cariniferus from its type description.

Scientific classification
- Kingdom: Animalia
- Phylum: Mollusca
- Class: Gastropoda
- Subclass: Caenogastropoda
- Order: Architaenioglossa
- Family: Viviparidae
- Genus: Viviparus
- Species: V. cariniferus

Binomial name
- Viviparus cariniferus (Sowerby, 1826)

Synonyms
- Paludina carinifera Sowerby, 1826

= Viviparus cariniferus =

Viviparus cariniferus Temporal range: Bathonian–Bartonian

Extinct species of gastropod

Viviparus cariniferus is an extinct species of freshwater snail with an operculum, an aquatic gastropod mollusk in the family Viviparidae, the river snails. It lived between the Bathonian and Bartonian epochs; although it may have persisted into the Oligocene.

Viviparus cariniferus is often found preserved in Purbeck Marble, although it has also been found in Oxfordshire and Gloucestershire.

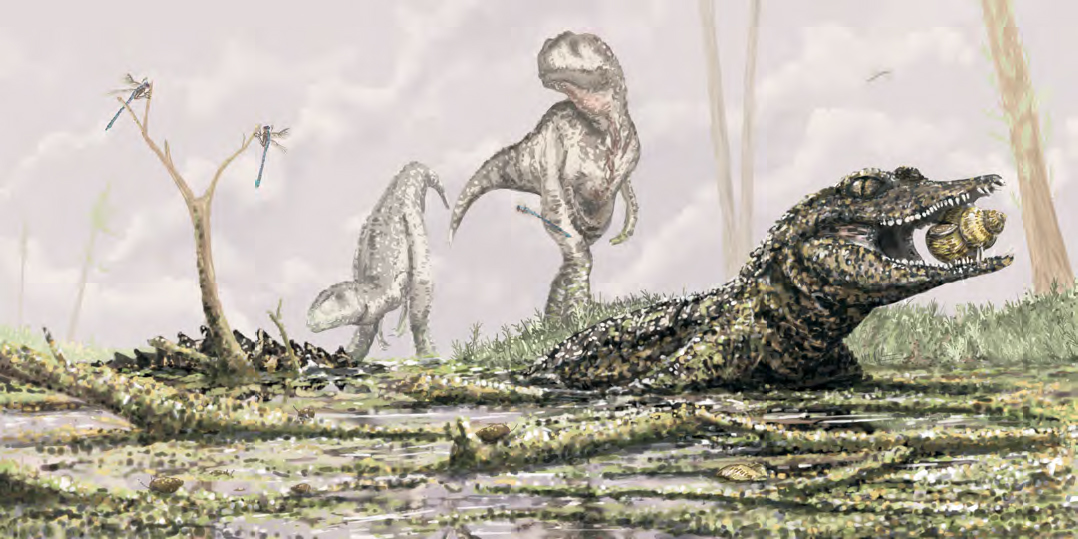
Koumpiodontosuchus aprosdokiti feeding on Viviparus cariniferus.

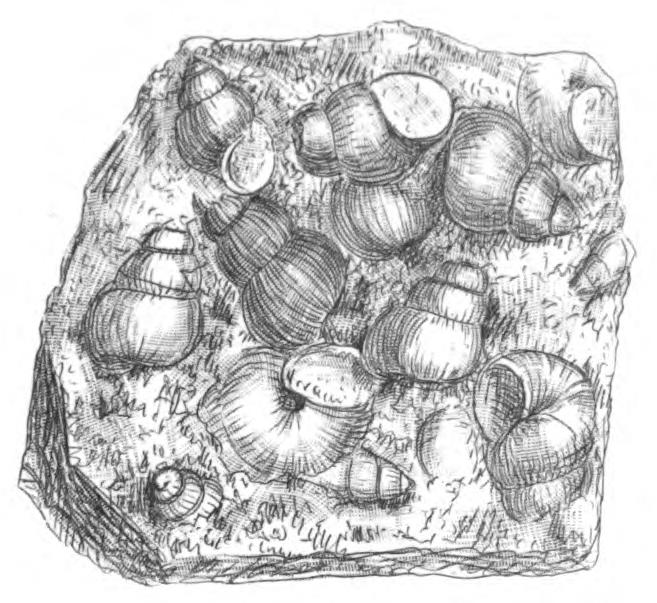
Purbeck Marble with shells of Viviparus cariniferus.
