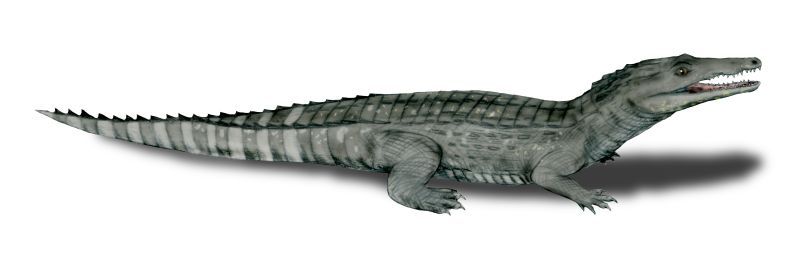
- Life restoration of Bernissartia

Scientific classification
- Kingdom: Animalia
- Phylum: Chordata
- Class: Reptilia
- Clade: Archosauria
- Clade: Pseudosuchia
- Clade: Crocodylomorpha
- Clade: Mesoeucrocodylia
- Clade: Metasuchia
- Clade: Neosuchia
- Family: †Bernissartiidae; Dollo, 1883

Genera
- †Bernissartia; †Koumpiodontosuchus

= Bernissartiidae =

Bernissartiidae Temporal range: Early Cretaceous, 145–110 Ma

Extinct family of reptiles

Bernissartiidae is an extinct family of neosuchian crocodyliformes known from the Early Cretaceous. Bernissartiid fossils have been reported from Belgium, France, Spain, England, Tunisia and the United States. It currently contains two genera, Bernissartia from the Barremian aged Sainte-Barbe Clays of Belgium and Koumpiodontosuchus from the equivalently aged Wessex Formation in southern England. Members of this family display adaptations for a durophagous lifestyle, especially the heterodont dentition of Koumpiodontosuchus. Indeterminate remains have been reported from the Oum ed Diab Member of Tunisia, the Cloverly Formation and Arundel Clay of the United States, and the La Huérguina Formation, Blesa Formation, Villanueva de Huerva Formation, El Castellar Formation, Camarillas Formation and El Collado Formation of Spain, and the Angeac-Charente bonebed in France.
