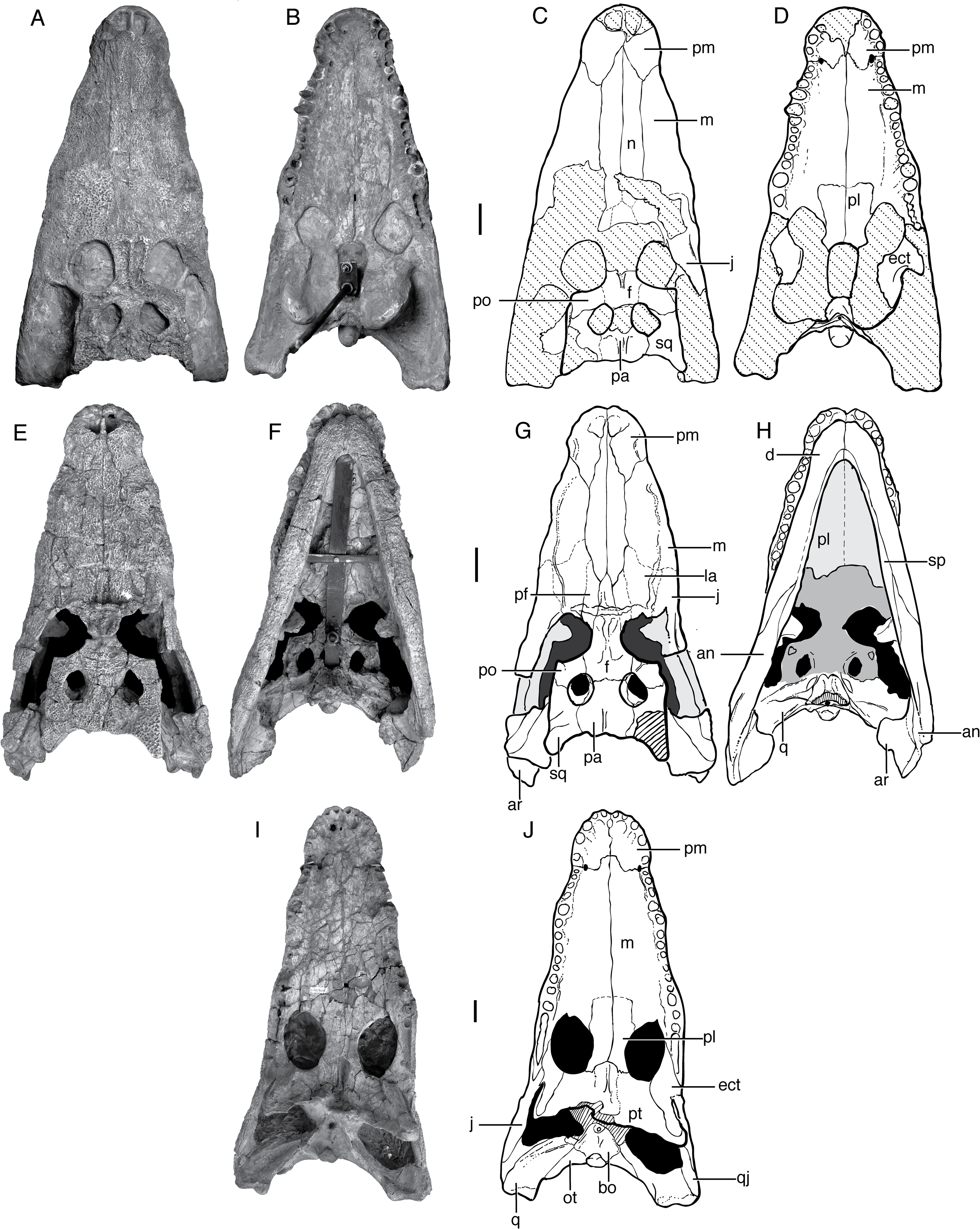
- P. gradilifrons and P. major skulls from the Bayan Shireh Formation

Scientific classification
- Kingdom: Animalia
- Phylum: Chordata
- Class: Reptilia
- Clade: Archosauria
- Clade: Pseudosuchia
- Clade: Crocodylomorpha
- Clade: Neosuchia
- Family: †Paralligatoridae
- Genus: †Paralligator

Type species
- †Paralligator gradilifrons Konzhukova, 1954

Other species
- †P. ancestralis Efimov, 1981; †P. major Efimov, 1981

Synonyms
- Shamosuchus tersus Efimov, 1983; Shamosuchus ulanicus Efimov, 1983; Shamosuchus ulgicus Efimov, 1981

= Paralligator =

Paralligator Temporal range: Late Cretaceous, ~96–70 Ma

Extinct genus of neosuchian crocodile

Paralligator is an extinct genus of neosuchian crocodylomorph that lived during the Late Cretaceous (Cenomanian-Maastrichtian) period in what is now the Bayan Shireh and Nemegt formations of Mongolia, approximately 96 million to 70 million years ago.

== Description ==
P. gradilifrons reached up to 4 m (13 ft) in length. The cerebral hemispheres are the widest portions of the endocast of Paralligator; they are approximately 2.5 times wider than the olfactory tract and about 1.5 times wider than the midbrain and the portion corresponding to the medulla oblongata. The olfactory complex is as long as the remainder of the endocast and is thus highly anteroposteriorly elongated. The olfactory tract of Paralligator is transversally narrow and highly elongated, and it expands posteriorly into the cerebral hemispheres and anteriorly into the olfactory bulbs, which are paired and are divided by the mesethmoid facet, diverging anteriorly at an angle of approximately 25°–30°. Posterior to the cerebral hemispheres lies the mesencephalic portion of the endocast, which is notably constricted when observed from a dorsal view. Posterior to the mesencephalic portion of the endocast lies the anterior portion of the rhombencephalon, consisting of the pons and cerebellum; this section is notably laterally and dorsoventrally expanded. The flocculus is not developed. The medulla oblongata is wider lateromedially than it is deep.

== Taxonomy ==
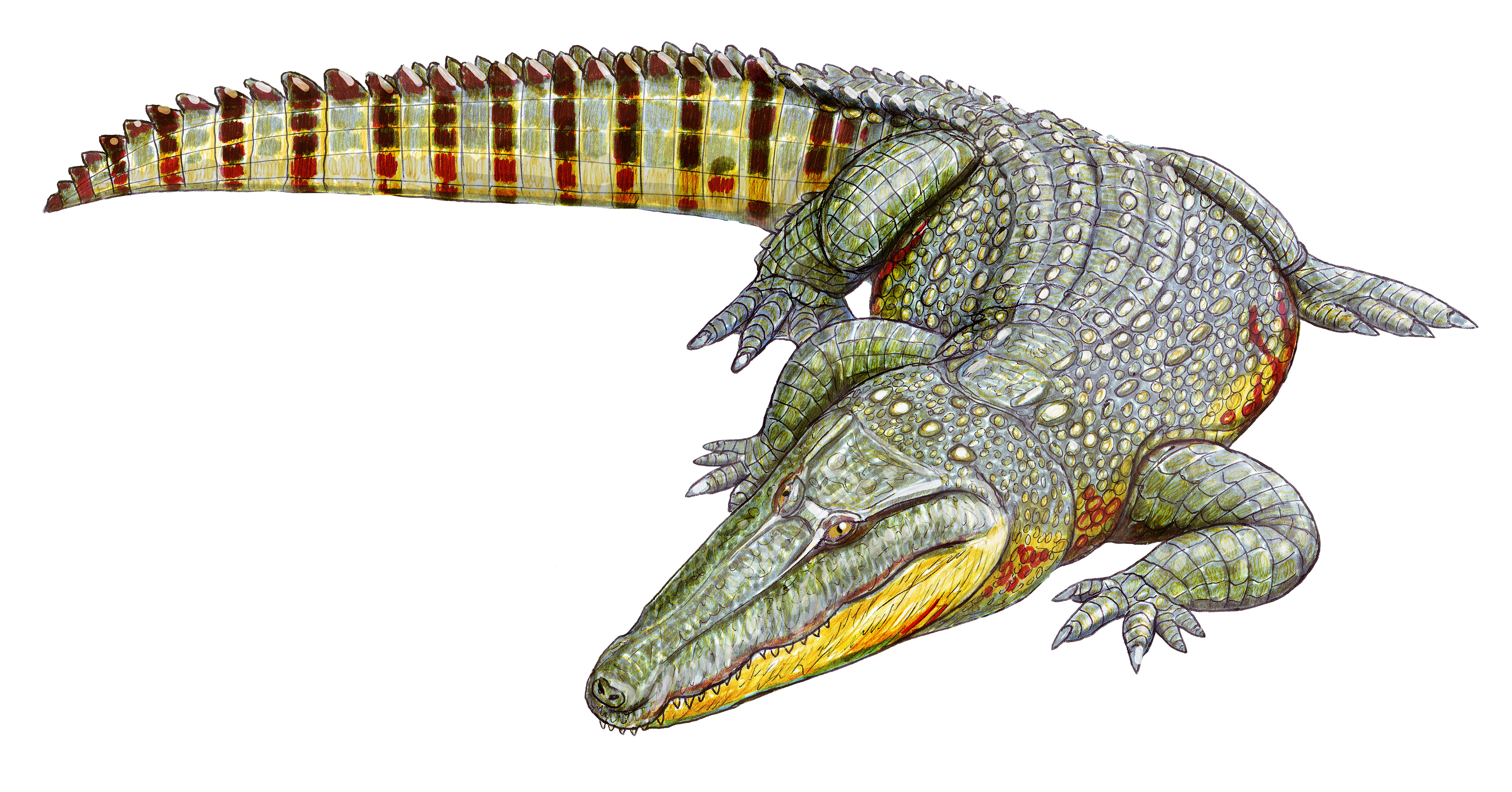
Life restoration of P. gradilifrons

Two species are recognized:

- Paralligator gradilifrons Konzhukova, 1954
- Paralligator major Efimov, 1981

== Misassigned species ==
"Paralligator" sungaricus, described from the Early Cretaceous Nenjiang Formation of Jilin Province, China, is based on postcranial remains consisting of a few presacral vertebrae, dorsal osteoderms, a partial left femur, and the proximal part of a left tibia and fibula. However, the type material is too fragmentary to be considered diagnostic, and the species is a nomen dubium. Turner (2015) also referred P. ancestralis a junior subjective synonym of P. gradilifrons.
