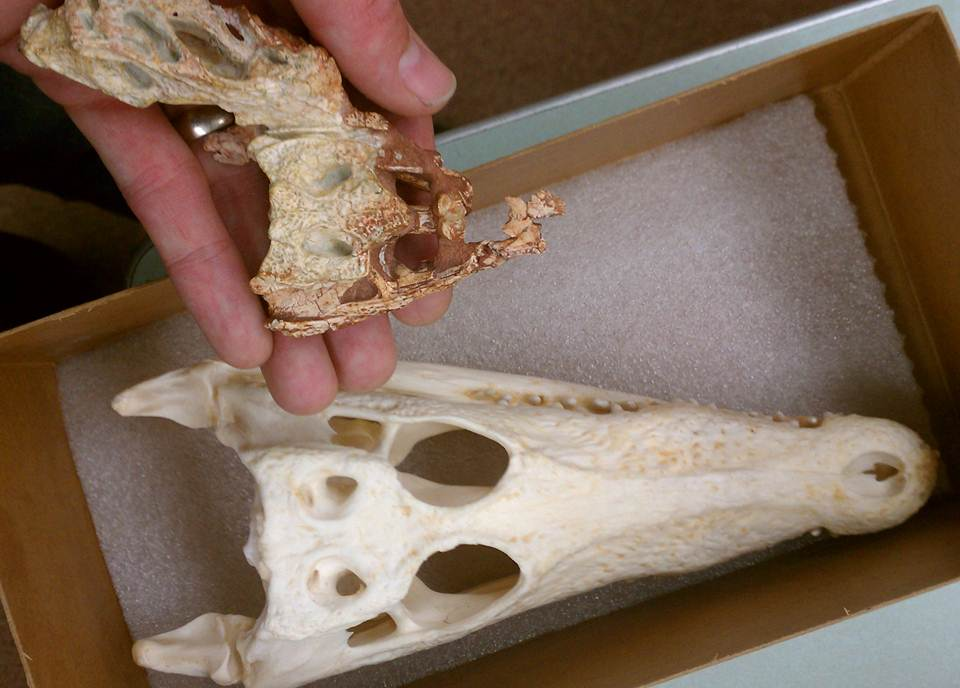
- W. kirpachi holotype and paratype with modern Crocodylus porosus skull for comparison.

Scientific classification
- Kingdom: Animalia
- Phylum: Chordata
- Class: Reptilia
- Clade: Archosauria
- Clade: Pseudosuchia
- Clade: Crocodylomorpha
- Clade: Neosuchia
- Family: †Paralligatoridae
- Genus: †Wannchampsus; Adams, 2014
- Species: †W. kirpachi

Binomial name
- †Wannchampsus kirpachi Adams, 2014

= Wannchampsus =

Wannchampsus Temporal range: Early Cretaceous, 119–113 Ma

Genus of neosuchian crocodyliforms (fossil)

Wannchampsus ("Wann Langston, Jr.'s crocodile") is an extinct genus of paralligatorid neosuchian, close to but not a true crocodilian. It is known from fossils discovered in Lower Cretaceous rocks in north-central Texas, United States.

== Description and classification ==
Wannchampsus is based on SMU 76604, a partial skull and lower jaw. This fossil is attached by matrix to another partial skull of the same genus and species, SMU 76605. A handful of other fossils were found associated, mostly representing forelimbs and vertebrae. These fossils were found in rocks of the late Aptian-age Lower Cretaceous Twin Mountains Formation, southwest of Stephenville, in Comanche County, Texas; the site is otherwise known as the Proctor Lake dinosaur locality. Wannchampsus was described in 2014 by Thomas Adams. The type species is W. kirpachi, in honor of Wesley Kirpach, "who was instrumental in the discovery and excavations of the type specimen".

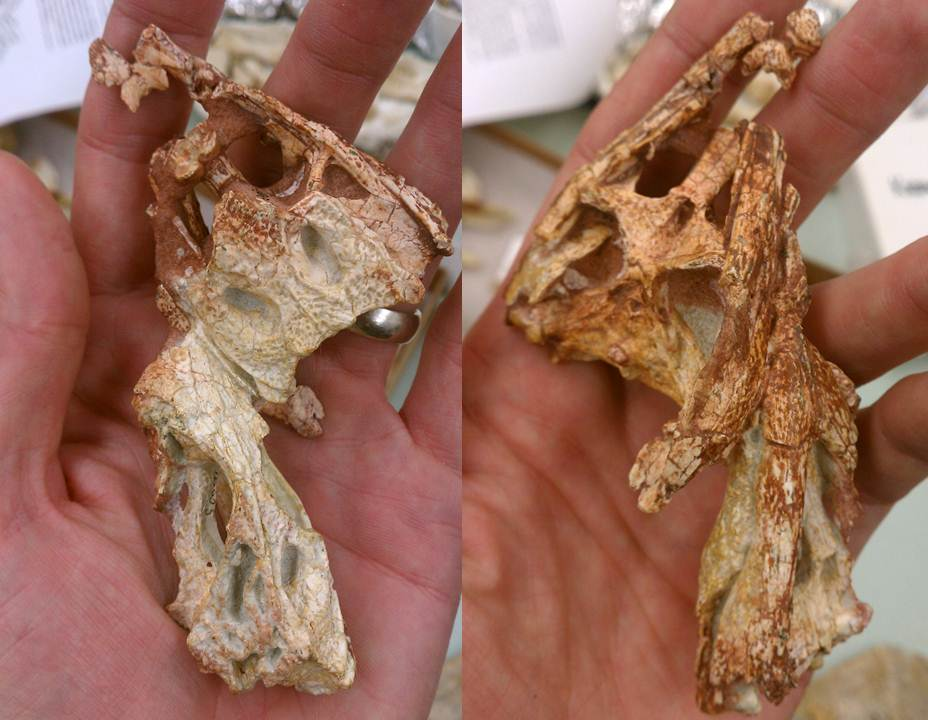
W. kirpachi holotype and paratype fossilized skulls

The skulls are described as "low and broad", and are small; SMU 76604 is estimated at 64 millimetres (2.5 in) long, and SMU 76605 is estimated at 62 millimetres (2.4 in) long. The lower jaw lacks external mandibular fenestrae, and the third tooth of the maxilla (main tooth-bearing bone of the upper jaw) and the fourth tooth of the dentary (tooth-bearing bone of the lower jaw) are enlarged. The teeth become broader and less conical going back toward the jaw joint, and the teeth at the anterior end of the lower jaw project forward (the anterior end of the upper jaw, composed of the premaxillas, is not known). Features of the skull and vertebrae indicate that the individuals are subadults. Adams performed a phylogenetic analysis and found Wannchampsus kirpachi to be a derived paralligatorid, closely related to the "Glen Rose form", which he regarded as belonging to the genus Wannchampsus.
