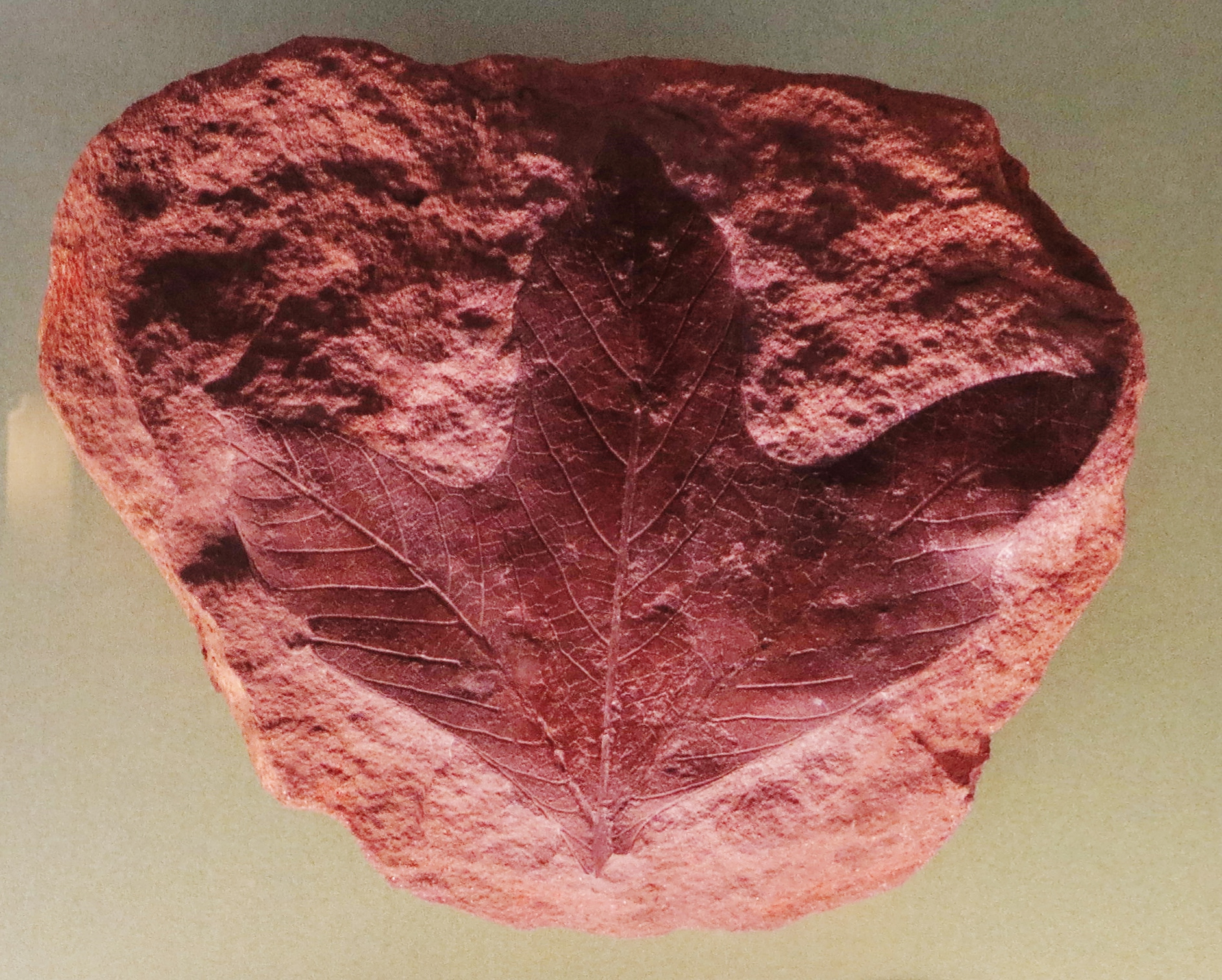
- Fossil leaf imprint of Araliopsoides cretacea

Scientific classification
- Kingdom: Plantae
- Clade: Tracheophytes
- Clade: Angiosperms
- Clade: Eudicots
- Clade: Asterids
- Order: Apiales
- Family: Araliaceae
- Genus: †Araliopsoides; Berry, 1916

Species
- A. breviloba; A. cretacea (type); A. kiensis; A. minor

Synonyms
- Araliopsis

= Araliopsoides =

Extinct genus of plants

Araliopsoides is an extinct genus of flowering plants in the family Araliaceae known from the Cretaceous of North America, Siberia and Eastern Europe. There are four species known; A. cretacea, the type, and A. breviloba are both known from Maryland, USA, A. kiensis from Siberia, and A. minor from Poland and Ukraine.
