= Khoratosuchus =

Khoratosuchus Temporal range: Early Cretaceous, Aptian–Albian

Scientific classification
- Domain: Eukaryota
- Kingdom: Animalia
- Phylum: Chordata
- Class: Reptilia
- Clade: Archosauria
- Clade: Pseudosuchia
- Clade: Crocodylomorpha
- Clade: Crocodyliformes
- Clade: Neosuchia
- Genus: †Khoratosuchus; Lauprasert et al., 2009

Type species
- †Khoratosuchus jintasakuli Lauprasert et al., 2009

Extinct genus of reptiles

Khoratosuchus is an extinct genus of neosuchian crocodylomorph which existed in northeast Thailand during the early Cretaceous period. Its type species is Khoratosuchus jintasakuli. Khoratosuchus is the youngest and most advanced Mesozoic crocodyliform yet known from Thailand. It possesses several distinctive features that help determine its phylogenetic position among crocodylomorphs, including secondary choanae relatively posterior and almost encircled by the pterygoid bones on the palate and a smooth dorsal surface of the skull.
