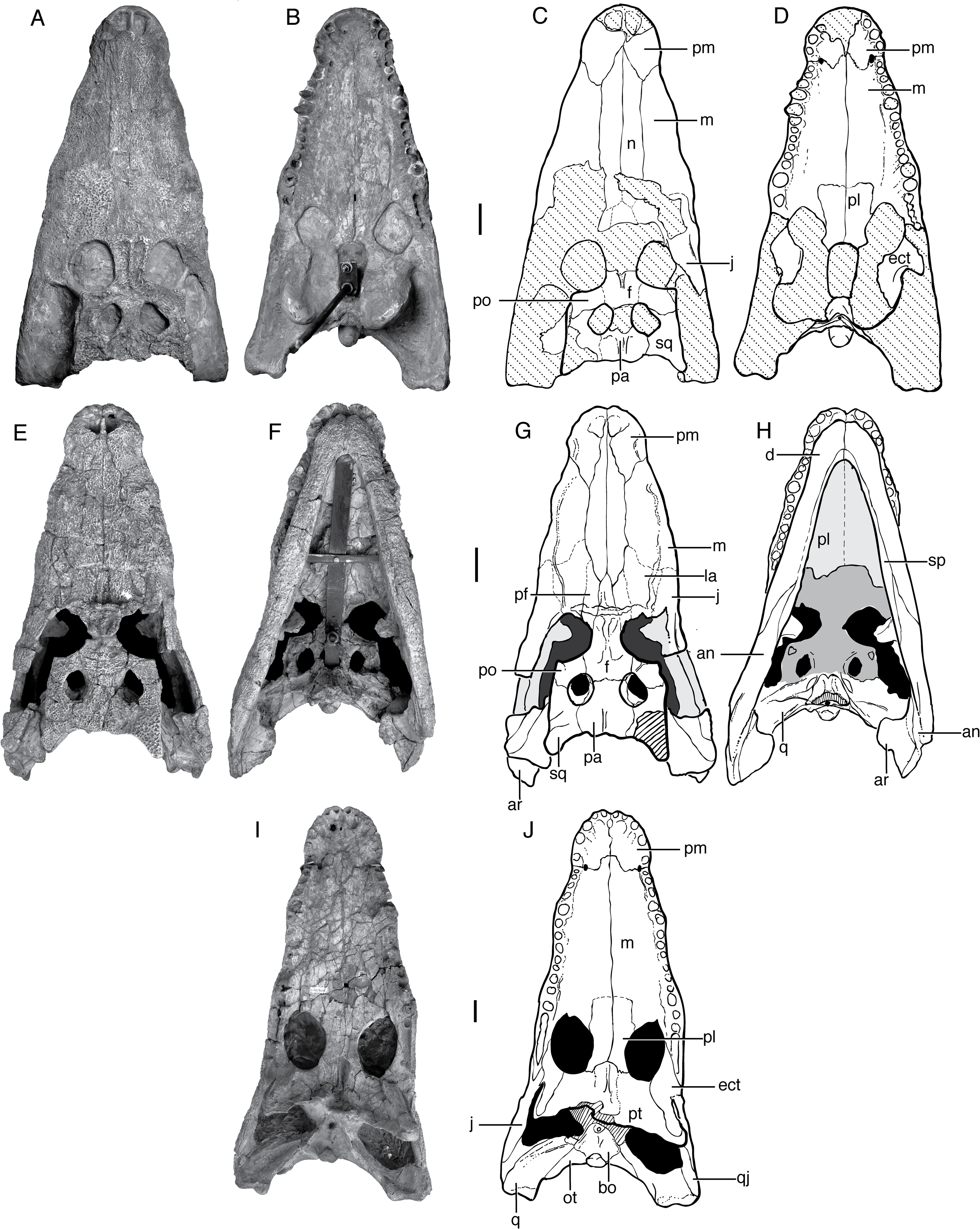
- Skulls of Paralligator
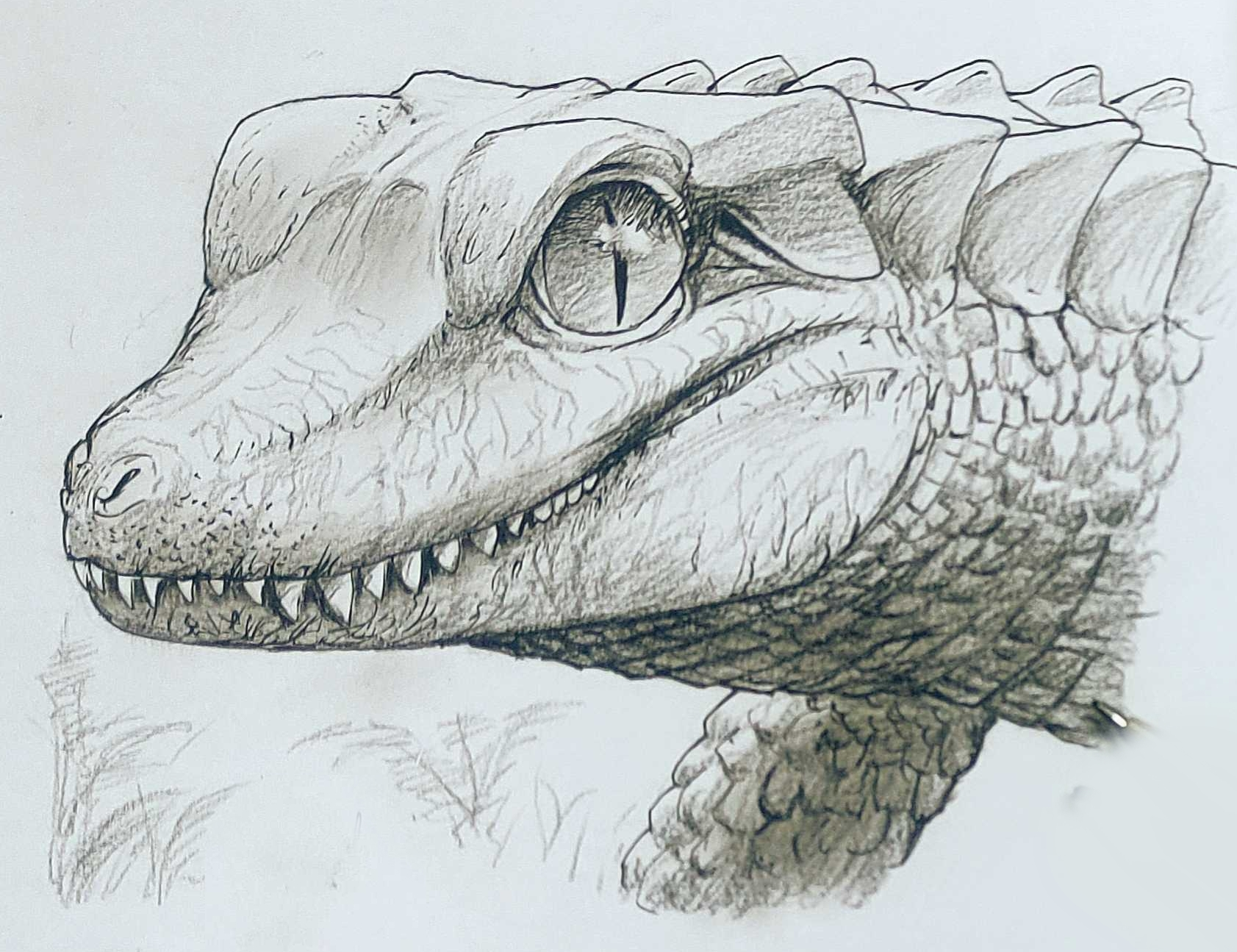
- Life restoration of Shamosuchus djadochtaensis

Scientific classification
- Kingdom: Animalia
- Phylum: Chordata
- Class: Reptilia
- Clade: Pseudosuchia
- Clade: Crocodylomorpha
- Clade: Neosuchia
- Family: †Paralligatoridae; Konzhukova, 1954

Genera
- †Batrachomimus; †Brillanceausuchus; †Doratodon; †Kansajsuchus; †Paralligator; †Rugosuchus; †Sabresuchus; †Scolomastax; †Shamosuchus; †Tarsomordeo; †Yanjisuchus

= Paralligatoridae =

Paralligatoridae Temporal range: Late Jurassic - Late Cretaceous, Oxfordian–Maastrichtian

Extinct family of reptiles

Paralligatoridae is an extinct family of neosuchian crocodyliforms that existed during the Jurassic and Cretaceous periods. It includes the genera Paralligator, Brillanceausuchus, Kansajsuchus, Shamosuchus, Doratodon, Scolomastax, Sabresuchus, Rugosuchus, and Batrachomimus.

== Evolution ==
Phylogenetic analyses of crocodyliforms find Paralligatoridae to nest within Neosuchia, a large clade (evolutionary grouping) that also includes modern crocodylians. In crocodyliform phylogeny, paralligatorids are usually found near the base of Neosuchia, outside the clade Eusuchia, which includes crocodylians and their closest relatives. Below is a cladogram from Montefeltro et al. (2013) showing the phylogenetic relationships of Paralligatoridae:

- Mesoeucrocodylia
  - Thalattosuchia
  - Metasuchia
    - Notosuchia
    - Neosuchia
      - - Khoratosuchus jintasakuli
        - Tethysuchia
      - - Theriosuchus
        - - Goniopholididae
          - - Bernissartia fagesii
            - - Paralligatoridae
                - Batrachomimus pastosbonensis
                - - Shamosuchus spp.
                  - Rugosuchus nonganensis
              - Eusuchia
                - Susisuchus anatoceps
                - Hylaeochampsa vectiana
                - - Allodaposuchus precedens
                  - Hylaeochampsidae
                    - Pietraroiasuchus ormezzanoi
                    - Iharkutosuchus makadii
                  - - Isisfordia duncani
                    - Crocodylia
