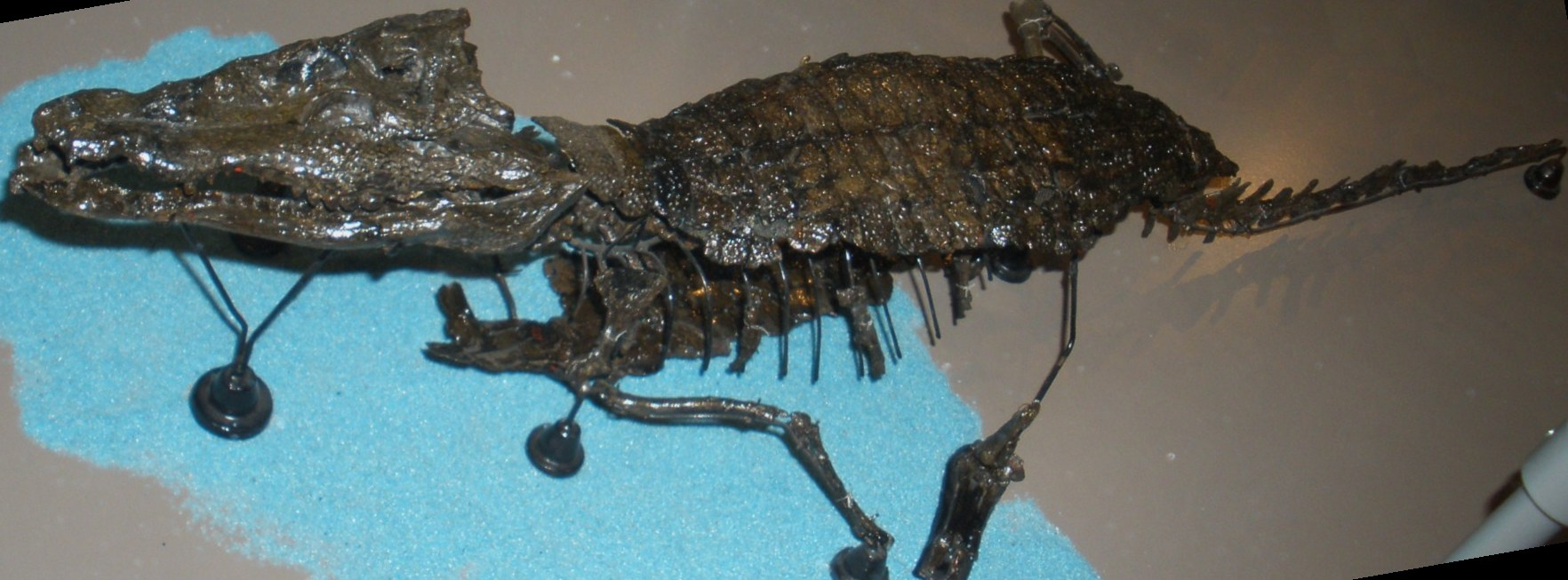
- Holotype skeleton of B. fagesii

Scientific classification
- Kingdom: Animalia
- Phylum: Chordata
- Class: Reptilia
- Clade: Archosauria
- Clade: Pseudosuchia
- Clade: Crocodylomorpha
- Clade: Metasuchia
- Clade: Neosuchia
- Family: †Bernissartiidae
- Genus: †Bernissartia; Dollo, 1883

Type species
- †Bernissartia fagesii Dollo, 1883

= Bernissartia =

Bernissartia Temporal range: Early Cretaceous, 129.4–125 Ma

Extinct genus of reptiles

Bernissartia ('of Bernissart') is an extinct genus of neosuchian crocodyliform that lived in the Early Cretaceous, around 130 million years ago.

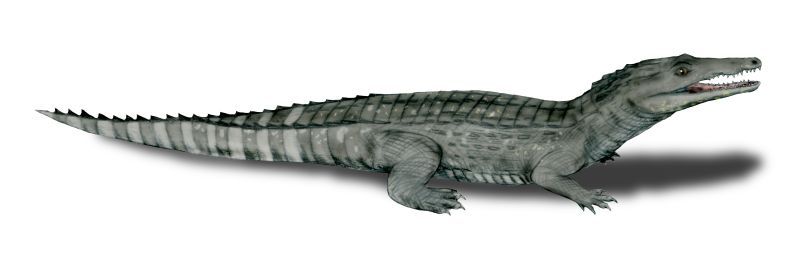
Restoration

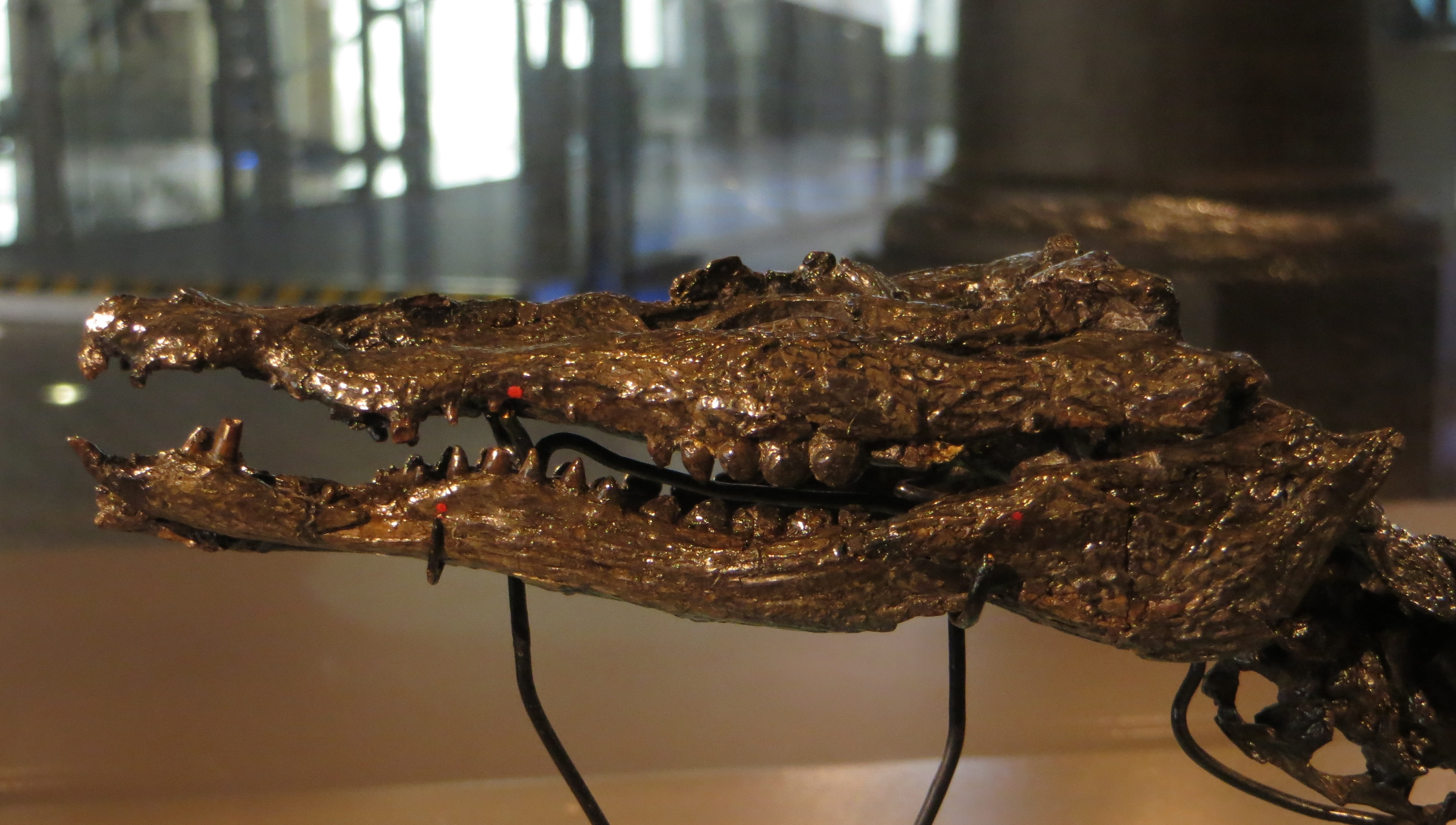
Lateral view of skull

At only 60 centimetres (2.0 ft) in length, Bernissartia is one of the smallest crocodyliforms that ever lived. It resembled modern species in many respects, and was probably semi-aquatic. It had long, pointed teeth at the front of the jaws that would have been of use in catching fish, but broad and flat teeth at the back of its jaws that were suited for crushing hard food, such as shellfish, and possibly bones.

It is known primarily from skulls and skeletons found in the Sainte-Barbe Clays Formation of Belgium and the Camarillas Formation of Spain. Less complete material has been referred to Bernissartia from the United Kingdom and North America.

== See also ==
- Koumpiodontosuchus aprosdokiti
- Smallest organisms
