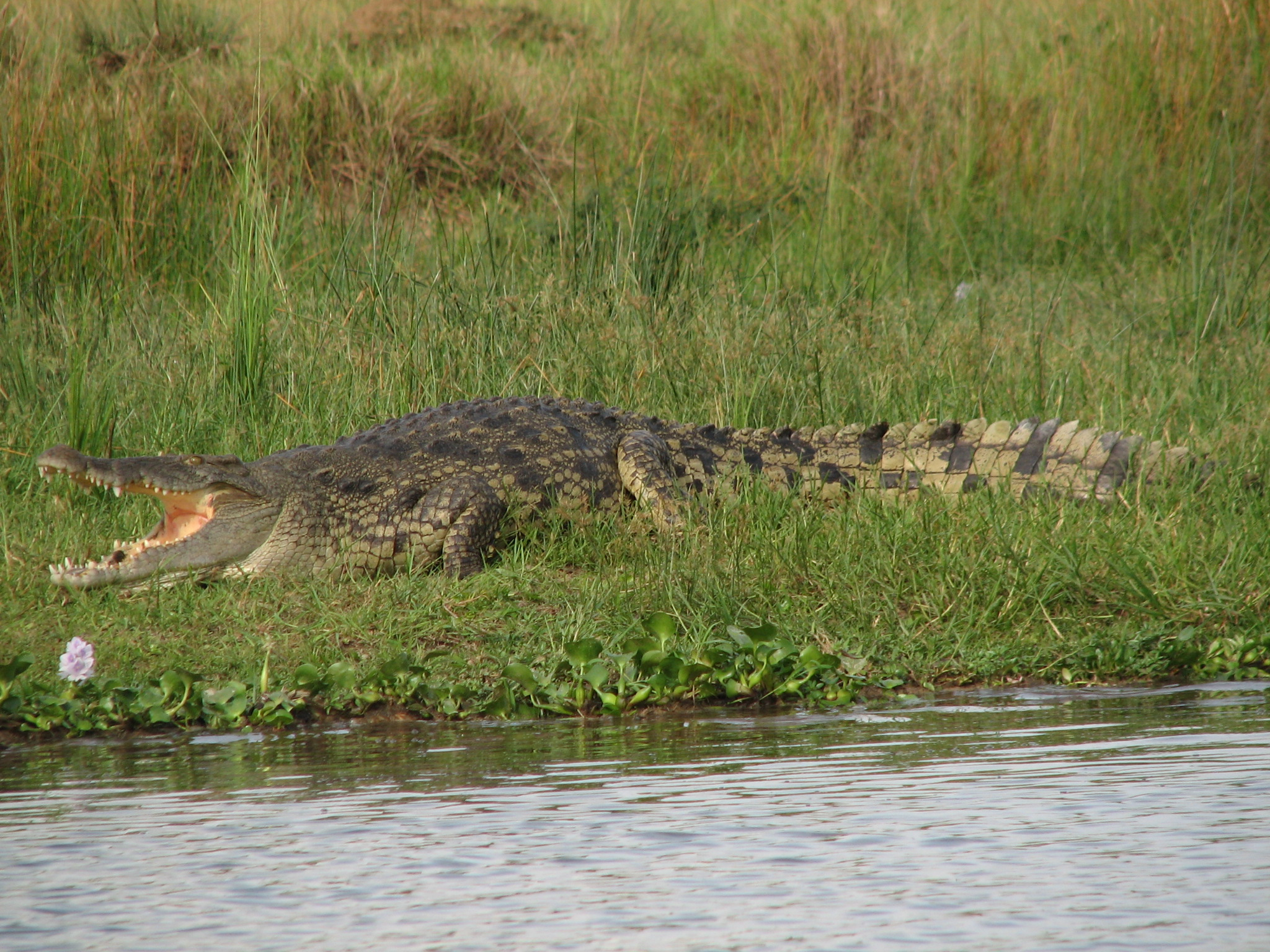
- Crocodylus niloticus, a modern crocodylid
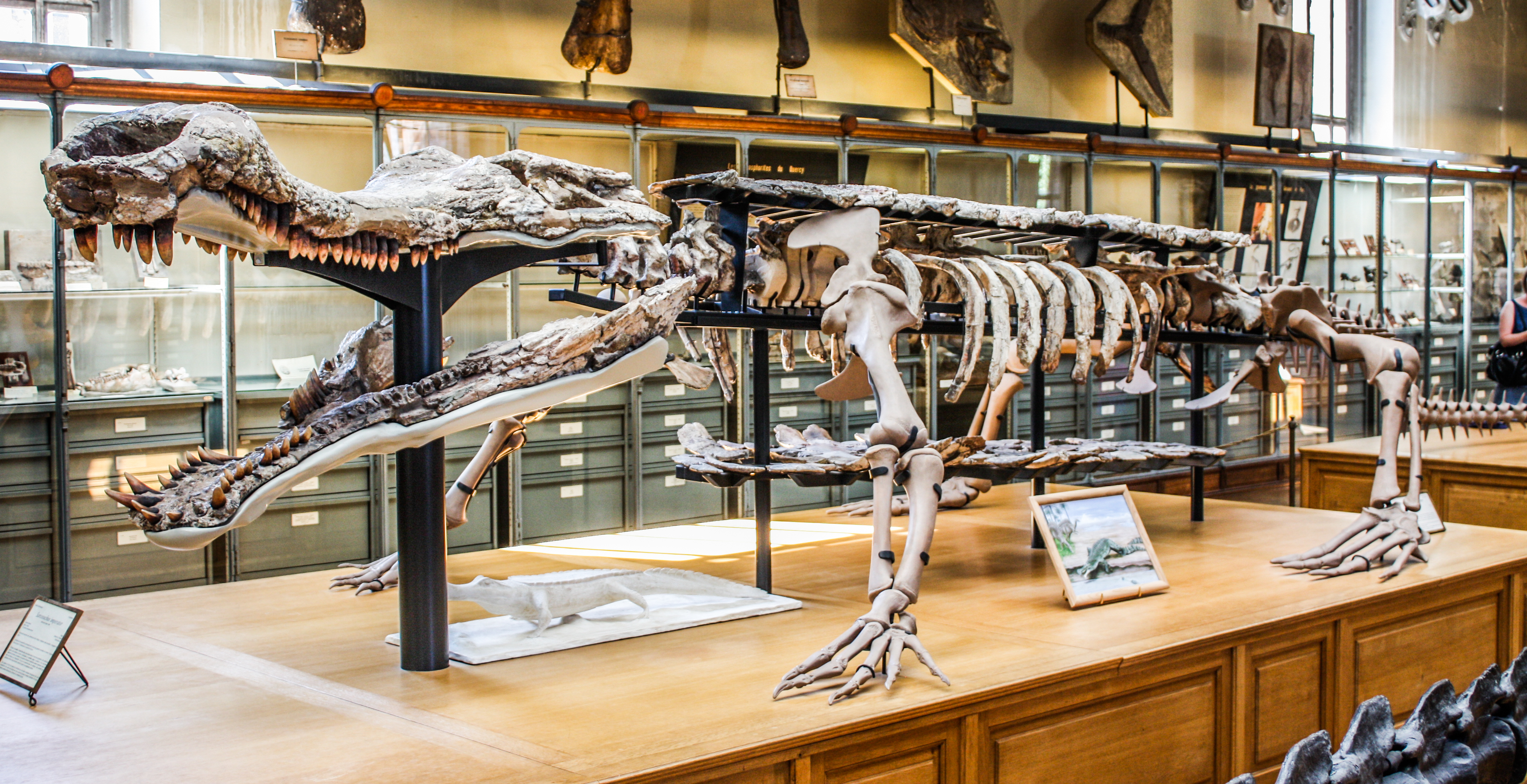
- Sarcosuchus imperator, a pholidosaurid from North Africa in the Early Cretaceous

Scientific classification
- Kingdom: Animalia
- Phylum: Chordata
- Class: Reptilia
- Clade: Pseudosuchia
- Clade: Crocodylomorpha
- Clade: Metasuchia
- Clade: Neosuchia; Benton & Clark, 1988

Subgroups
- †Burkesuchus; †Gilchristosuchus; †Isisfordia; †Karatausuchus; †Khoratosuchus; †Montsecosuchus; †Paluxysuchus; †Stolokrosuchus?; †Susisuchus; †Tadzhikosuchus; †Wahasuchus?; †Atoposauridae; †Bernissartiidae; †Goniopholididae; †Paralligatoridae; †Stomatosuchidae; †Tethysuchia; †Thalattosuchia?; †Wannchampsidae; Eusuchia (includes crocodylians)

= Neosuchia =

Neosuchia Temporal range: Early Jurassic - Recent, 196.5–0 Ma

Clade of reptiles

Neosuchia is a clade within Mesoeucrocodylia that includes all modern extant crocodilians and their closest fossil relatives. It is defined as the most inclusive clade containing all crocodylomorphs more closely related to Crocodylus niloticus (the Nile Crocodile) than to Notosuchus terrestris. Members of Neosuchia generally share a crocodilian-like bodyform adapted to freshwater aquatic life, as opposed to the terrestrial habits of more basal crocodylomorph groups. The earliest neosuchian is suggested to be the Early Jurassic Calsoyasuchus, which lived during the Sinemurian and Pliensbachian stages in North America. It is often identified as a member of Goniopholididae, though this is disputed, and the taxon may lie outside Neosuchia, which places the earliest records of the group in the Middle Jurassic.

== Characteristics ==
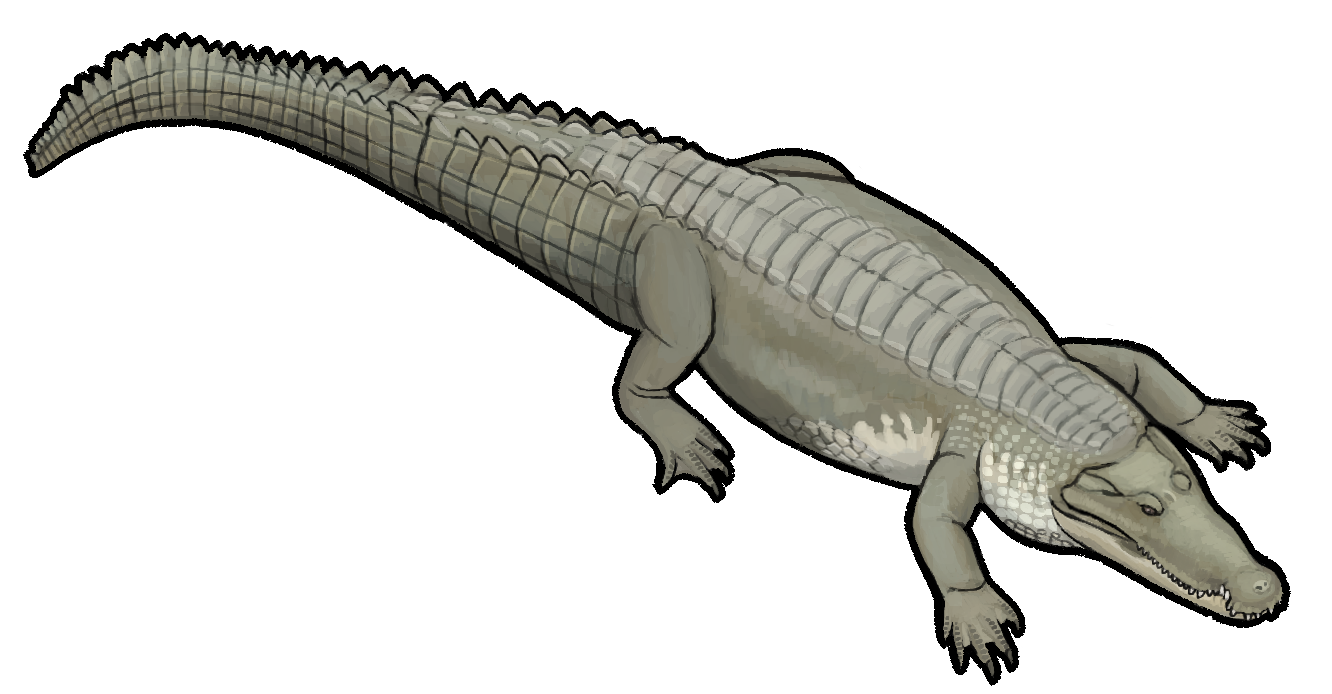
Life restoration of Siamosuchus, a member of Goniopholididae

Members of Neosuchia have a wide diversity of skull shapes. Several groups convergently evolved elongate gharial-like skulls, which makes determining phylogenetic relationships of these taxa problematic.

== Phylogeny ==
Cladogram from Groh et al. 2022:

- Neosuchia
  - †Alligatorellus
  - - †Alligatorium
    - - †Atoposauridae
      - - †Tethysuchia
        - - †Goniopholididae
          - - - †Koumpiodontosuchus
              - †Paralligatoridae
            - - - †Susisuchus
                - †Isisfordia
              - Eusuchia
