= 2019 in archosaur paleontology =

This article records new taxa of fossil archosaurs of every kind that are described during the year 2019, as well as other significant discoveries and events related to paleontology of archosaurs that occurred in 2019.

== Pseudosuchians ==
=== New pseudosuchian taxa ===
Name	Novelty	Status	Authors	Age	Type locality	Country	Notes	Images
Acresuchus	Gen. et sp. nov	Valid	Souza-Filho et al.	Late Miocene	Solimões Formation	Brazil	A caiman. Genus includes new species A. pachytemporalis.	
Aprosuchus	Gen. et sp. nov	Valid	Venczel & Codrea	Late Cretaceous (Maastrichtian)	Hațeg Basin	Romania	A Theriosuchus-like crocodyliform. Genus includes new species A. ghirai.	
Astorgosuchus	Gen. nov	Valid	Martin et al.	Oligocene	Chitarwata Formation	Pakistan	A member of Crocodyloidea of uncertain phylogenetic placement. Genus includes the species A. bugtiensis.	
Barrosasuchus	Gen. et sp. nov	Valid	Coria et al.	Late Cretaceous (Santonian)	Bajo de la Carpa Formation	Argentina	A peirosaurid crocodyliform. Genus includes new species B. neuquenianus. Announced in 2018; the final version of the article naming it was published in 2019.	
Bathysuchus	Gen. et comb. nov	Valid	Foffa et al.	Late Jurassic (Kimmeridgian)	Kimmeridge Clay Formation	England; France	A teleosaurid thalattosuchian. The type species is "Teleosaurus" megarhinus Hulke (1871).	
Colhuehuapisuchus	Gen. et sp. nov	Valid	Lamanna et al.	Late Cretaceous (Campanian–?early Maastrichtian)	Lago Colhué Huapí Formation	Argentina	A peirosaurid crocodyliform. The type species is C. lunai.	
Coloradisuchus	Gen. et sp. nov	Valid	Martínez, Alcober & Pol	Late Triassic (Norian)	Los Colorados Formation	Argentina	A protosuchid crocodyliform. Genus includes new species C. abelini.	
Cricosaurus bambergensis	Sp. nov	Valid	Sachs et al.	Late Jurassic (Kimmeridgian)	Torleite Formation	Germany	A new species of the metriorhynchid Cricosaurus from southern Germany, known from a nearly complete skeleton.	
Deslongchampsina	Gen. et comb. nov	Valid	Johnson, Young & Brusatte	Middle Jurassic (Bathonian)	Cornbrash Formation	United Kingdom	A relative of Steneosaurus heberti; a new genus for "Teleosaurus" larteti Eudes-Deslongchamps (1866).	
Hulkepholis rori	Sp. nov	Valid	Arribas et al.	Early Cretaceous (Barremian)	Camarillas Formation	Spain	A member of the family Goniopholididae.	
Indosinosuchus	Gen. et sp. nov	Valid	Martin et al.	Probably Middle or Late Jurassic	Phu Kradung Formation	Thailand	A member of the family Teleosauridae. Genus includes new species I. potamosiamensis.	
Isisfordia molnari	Sp. nov	Disputed	Hart et al.	Late Cretaceous (Cenomanian)	Griman Creek Formation	Australia	Hart (2020) considered it to be likely a junior subjective synonym of the species Isisfordia selaslophensis (Etheridge, 1917), but was unable to determine this with certainty, as both taxa are currently represented by non-overlapping fossil material.	I. molnari (C)
Jiangxisuchus	Gen. et sp. nov	Valid	Li, Wu & Rufolo	Late Cretaceous (Maastrichtian)	Nanxiong Formation	China	A member of Orientalosuchina. Genus includes new species J. nankangensis. Announced in 2018; the final version of the article naming it was published in 2019.	Skull reconstruction of Jiangxisuchus, scalebar = 3 cm
Opisuchus	Gen. et sp. nov	Valid	Aiglstorfer, Havlik & Herrera	Middle Jurassic (Aalenian)		Germany	A non-metriorhynchid metriorhynchoid crocodyliform. Genus includes new species O. meieri.	
Orientalosuchus	Gen. et sp. nov	Valid	Massonne et al.	Eocene (late Bartonian to Priabonian)	Na Duong Formation	Vietnam	A member of Orientalosuchina. The type species is O. naduongensis.	
Scolomastax	Gen. et sp. nov	Valid	Noto et al.	Late Cretaceous (Cenomanian)	Woodbine Formation	United States (Texas)	A crocodyliform belonging to the family Paralligatoridae. Genus includes new species S. sahlsteini.	
Tarsomordeo	Gen. et sp. nov	Valid	Adams	Early Cretaceous (Aptian)	Twin Mountains Formation	United States (Texas)	A crocodyliform belonging to the family Paralligatoridae. Genus includes new species T. winkleri.	
Yvridiosuchus	Gen. et comb. nov	Valid	Johnson, Young & Brusatte	Middle Jurassic (Bathonian)	Cornbrash Formation	United Kingdom	A basal member of the tribe Machimosaurini; a new genus for "Teleosaurus" boutilieri Eudes-Deslongchamps (1868).	

=== Pseudosuchian research ===
- A study on the bone histology of Coahomasuchus chathamensis, and on its implications for inferring ontogeny and growth strategy of this species, is published by Hoffman, Heckert & Zanno (2019).
- Tolchard et al. (2019) revise fragmentary archosaurian remains from the latest Triassic lower Elliot Formation (South Africa), interpreting them as fossils of at least two distinct taxa of "rauisuchians", thus representing the southernmost palaeolatitudes that these animals are known to have occurred, their first definitive remains from southern Africa, and some of the most recent records of members of this grade.
- A study on the anatomy of the skeleton of Poposaurus gracilis is published online by Schachner et al. (2019).
- A study on the age of sandstones of the Badong Formation preserving fossils of Lotosaurus adentus is published by Wang et al. (2019).
- Description of the anatomy of the skull of a new specimen of Prestosuchus chiniquensis from the Dinodontosaurus Assemblage Zone of the Pinheiros-Chiniquá Sequence, Santa Maria Super sequence (Brazil) is published by Mastrantonio et al. (2019), who also present the first description of a rauisuchian cranial endocast.
- A study on habitat shifts during the evolutionary history of Crocodylomorpha is published by Wilberg, Turner & Brochu (2019).
- A study on patterns of body size evolution of crocodylomorphs is published by Godoy et al. (2019).
- A study on the quality of the fossil record of non-marine crocodylomorphs is published by Mannion et al. (2019).
- A study on the evolution of skull shape in crocodylomorphs is published online by Godoy (2019).
- A study on the diversity of feeding ecologies of Mesozoic crocodyliforms is published by Melstrom & Irmis (2019).
- A study on patterns of crocodyliform snout shape, on their inferred diet and on the relationship between form and function of crocodyliform skull shape throughout the evolutionary history of this group is published online by Drumheller & Wilberg (2019).
- New fossil material (an isolated left dentary) of Orthosuchus stormbergi is described from the Upper Elliot Formation (South Africa) by Dollman, Viglietti & Choiniere (2019), who also examine the stratigraphic positions of all valid crocodylomorph specimens from the main Karoo Basin.
- Teleosaurid and metriorhynchid teeth are described from, respectively, the Middle Jurassic (Aalenian) and Upper Jurassic (Tithonian) of Slovakia by Čerňanský et al. (2019), representing the first record of members of both families from the country.
- Partial skeleton of a teleosauroid crocodylomorph, representing the most recent record of a definitive non-machimosaurin teleosauroid in Africa reported so far, is described from the Callovian of Tunisia by Dridi & Johnson (2019).
- Fossils of a member of Teleosauroidea with an estimated body length of 9.6 m, representing the most recent definitive record of Teleosauroidea reported so far, are described from the Lower Cretaceous (upper Barremian) Paja Formation (Colombia) by Cortes et al. (2019).
- Redescription of the holotype specimens of Mystriosaurus laurillardi and "Steneosaurus" brevior and a study on the taxonomic validity and phylogenetic relationships of these species is published by Sachs et al. (2019).
- A study on the anatomy and phylogenetic relationships of metriorhynchoids from the Jurassic Rosso Ammonitico Veronese Formation (Italy) is published by Cau (2019), who provides a revised diagnosis of Neptunidraco ammoniticus.
- A three-dimensionally preserved occiput of a member of the genus Torvoneustes, indicating that members of this genus reached larger body sizes than previously supposed, is described from the Upper Jurassic Kimmeridge Clay Formation (United Kingdom) by Young et al. (2019).
- A study on teeth morphology and tooth enamel microstructure in Mariliasuchus amarali is published by Augusta & Zaher (2019).
- A study on the arrangement and morphology of the osteoderms of baurusuchids is published by Montefeltro (2019).
- A study on the anatomy of the pterygoid region and skull airways of Caipirasuchus paulistanus and C. montealtensis is published online by Dias et al. (2019), who report possible anatomical evidence of vocal capacity of C. montealtensis.
- Description of fossils and possible gastroliths of a large-bodied sphagesaurid from the Upper Cretaceous Adamantina Formation (Brazil) is published online by Cunha et al. (2019).
- Description of new fossil material of Pepesuchus from the Upper Cretaceous Adamantina Formation (Brazil) and a study on the phylogenetic relationships of this taxon is published by Geroto & Bertini (2019).
- A study on the diagenesis of fossils of Montealtosuchus arrudacamposi from the Upper Cretaceous Adamantina Formation is published by Marchetti et al. (2019).
- A study on the phylogenetic relationships of members of Neosuchia and on the evolution of longirostry in this group is published online by Groh et al. (2019).
- A study on the taxonomic status and phylogenetic relationships of Sarcosuchus hartti is published online by Souza et al. (2019).
- Partial dyrosaurid skeleton discovered in the 1930s in Paleocene (Danian) strata along the Atlantic coast of Senegal is described by Martin, Sarr & Hautier (2019).
- Description of new dyrosaurid specimens from the Late Cretaceous–early Paleogene of New Jersey (United States), and a study on their implications for the validity of the species Hyposaurus rogersii, is published online by Souza et al. (2019).
- Revision of the large-sized neosuchians Kansajsuchus and "Turanosuchus" from the Late Cretaceous of Central Asia is published by Kuzmin et al. (2019), who interpret Kansajsuchus as a member of Paralligatoridae, and consider Turanosuchus aralensis to be a member of the genus Kansajsuchus belonging or related to the species K. extensus.
- A study on the inner cavities of the skull of the holotype specimen of Lohuecosuchus megadontos is published by Serrano-Martínez et al. (2019).
- Revision of the fossil material of Allodaposuchus precedens from Vălioara (Romania) is published online by Narváez et al. (2019), who emend the diagnosis for this species.
- A study on palaeodiversity of eusuchians over time is published online by De Celis, Narváez & Ortega (2019).
- A tooth of a juvenile specimen of Deinosuchus, providing new information on the ontogeny of this reptile, is described by Brownstein (2019).
- A well-preserved braincase of Diplocynodon tormis is described from the middle Eocene site of 'Teso de la Flecha' (Salamanca, Spain) by Serrano-Martínez et al. (2019).
- A study on the anatomy and phylogenetic relationships of Diplocynodon hantoniensis is published online by Rio et al. (2020).
- Chroust, Mazuch & Luján (2019) describe new fossil material of Diplocynodon from four sites in the Czech Republic dating to Eocene–Oligocene transition, and evaluate the implications of these fossils for the knowledge of the course of the Eocene–Oligocene cooling event in Central Europe.
- New crocodylian fossils, documenting the presence of four previously unrecognised alligatoroids, are described from the Lower Miocene Castillo Formation (Venezuela) by Solórzano et al. (2019).
- A taxonomic and phylogenetic revision of Necrosuchus ionensis is published online by Cidade, Fortier & Hsiou (2019).
- Ten late Miocene specimens of Mourasuchus, tentatively assigned to the species M. arendsi, are described from Bolivia and from the Solimões Formation of Brazil by Cidade et al. (2019), who also discuss the morphology of Mourasuchus and paleogeographic distribution of this genus in the Miocene of South America.
- A study on the anatomy of the holotype of Mourasuchus amazonensis and on the taxonomic status of species belonging to the genus Mourasuchus is published by Cidade et al. (2019).
- A study on the feeding habits of Mourasuchus is published by Cidade, Riff & Hsiou (2019).
- A study on the structure of the vertebral column of Purussaurus mirandai, providing evidence of a deviation from the vertebral count present in all extant crocodilians, is published by Scheyer et al. (2019).
- A study on the taxonomic status of Balanerodus logimus and Caiman venezuelensis is published by Cidade et al. (2019).
- Fossils of a specimen of Asiatosuchus depressifrons from the late Paleocene of Mont de Berru (France), representing the oldest European crocodyloid remains reported so far, are described by Delfino et al. (2019).
- A study on geographical origin, historical biogeography and evolution of traits aiding dispersal of members of the genus Crocodylus is published by Nicolaï & Matzke (2019).
- Evidence of gavialine-specific atavistic characters in the skeletons of fossil tomistomines Penghusuchus pani and Toyotamaphimeia machikanensis is presented by Iijima & Kobayashi (2019).
- Skull and mandibular elements of a tomistomine (probably belonging to the genus Maomingosuchus) are described from the late Eocene lignite seams of Krabi (Thailand) by Martin et al. (2019), providing evidence of tomistomines living in the tropics in the late Eocene.
- A revision of members of the genus Gavialis described on the basis of fossils from the Sivalik Hills of India and Pakistan is published by Martin (2019).
- A study on the systematics of crocodilians known from the Oligocene fossil locality of Monteviale (Italy) is published by Macaluso et al. (2019).
- A revision of fossil record of Cenozoic crocodilians from Sardinia (Italy) is published by Zoboli et al. (2019).
- A review of the fossil crocodylomorph fauna of the Cenozoic of South America is published by Cidade, Fortier & Hsiou (2019).
- A method for the quantification of size- and shape-heterodonty in members of Crocodylia is presented by D'Amore et al. (2019), who apply their method to extant and fossil crocodylomorphs.
- A study on the global diversification dynamics of crocodylians since the Cretaceous is published online by Solórzano et al. (2019).
- A study testing whether the bone ornamentation may play a role in terms of load-bearing capacity and mechanical strength of pseudosuchian osteoderms, based on data from five osteoderms of crocodylomorphs (representing four species: Caiman crocodilus, Osteolaemus tetraspis, Hyposaurus rogersii, Sarcosuchus imperator) and one aetosaur osteoderm (Aetosaurus sp.), is published by Clarac et al. (2019).
- A study on the utility of head width as a body size proxy in extant crocodylians, and on its implications for estimates of body size of extinct crocodyliforms, is published by O'Brien et al. (2019).
- A study comparing skull anatomy and inferred head musculature, stress distribution in skulls and feeding mechanisms in members of the genera Pelagosaurus and Gavialis, and evaluating changes in mandibular function and feeding through time in the macroevolution of Crocodylomorpha, is published by Ballell et al. (2019).
- Description of fossils of longirostrine crocodylians from the Bartonian of southern Morocco is published by Jouve, Khalloufi & Zouhri (2019), who also discuss the implications of these fossils for the knowledge of the evolution of crocodylians through the Eocene–Oligocene transition.
- A study on the diversity of Late Jurassic crocodylomorph teeth from Valmitão (Lourinhã Formation, Portugal), and on the ecological niches and feeding behaviours of crocodylomorphs from this assemblage, is published online by Guillaume et al. (2019).
- Rivera-Sylva et al. (2019) report the first crocodyliform remains from La Parrita locality (Campanian Cerro del Pueblo Formation, Coahuila, Mexico).
- Description of an isolated crocodyliform tooth from the upper Eocene Ergilin Dzo Formation (Mongolia) and a study on the implications of this fossil for the knowledge of the regional paleoclimate of the area of Mongolia during the late Eocene is published by Iijima et al. (2019).
- A study on the morphological diversity and phylogenetic affinities of crocodylomorph teeth from the Maastrichtian Tremp Formation (north-eastern Spain) is published online by Blanco et al. (2019).

== Non-avian dinosaurs ==
=== New dinosaur taxa ===
Name	Novelty	Status	Authors	Age	Type locality	Country	Notes	Images
Adratiklit	Gen. et sp. nov	Valid	Maidment et al.	Middle Jurassic	El Mers II Formation	Morocco	A stegosaurid thyreophoran belonging to the subfamily Dacentrurinae. Genus includes new species A. boulahfa. Announced in 2019; the final version of the article naming it was published in 2020.	
Adynomosaurus	Gen. et sp. nov	Valid	Prieto-Márquez et al.	Late Cretaceous	Tremp Formation	Spain	A hadrosaurid ornithopod belonging to the subfamily Lambeosaurinae. Genus includes new species A. arcanus. Announced in 2018; the final version of the article naming it was published in 2019.	
Ambopteryx	Gen. et sp. nov	Valid	Wang et al.	Late Jurassic (Oxfordian)	Unnamed formation; equivalent to the Haifanggou Formation	China	A scansoriopterygid theropod. Genus includes new species A. longibrachium.	
Aquilarhinus	Gen. et sp. nov	Valid	Prieto-Márquez, Wagner & Lehman	Late Cretaceous (early Campanian)	Aguja Formation	United States (Texas)	A member of the family Hadrosauridae. The type species is A. palimentus.	
Asfaltovenator	Gen. et sp. nov		Rauhut & Pol	Jurassic (late Toarcian to Bajocian)	Cañadón Asfalto Formation	Argentina	A theropod dinosaur, probably an early member of Allosauroidea. The type species is A. vialidadi.	
Bajadasaurus	Gen. et sp. nov	Valid	Gallina et al.	Early Cretaceous (Berriasian–Valanginian)	Bajada Colorada Formation	Argentina	A dicraeosaurid sauropod. The type species is B. pronuspinax.	
Convolosaurus	Gen. et sp. nov	Valid	Andrzejewski, Winkler & Jacobs	Early Cretaceous (Aptian)	Twin Mountains Formation	United States (Texas)	A basal ornithopod. The type species is C. marri.	
Ferrisaurus	Gen. et sp. nov	Valid	Arbour & Evans	Late Cretaceous (Maastrichtian)	Tango Creek Formation	Canada (British Columbia)	A leptoceratopsid ceratopsian. The type species is F. sustutensis.	
Fostoria	Gen. et sp. nov	Valid	Bell et al.	Cretaceous (Albian or Cenomanian)	Griman Creek Formation	Australia	A non-hadrosauroid iguanodontian ornithopod. The type species is F. dhimbangunmal.	
Fushanosaurus	Gen. et sp. nov	Valid	Wang et al.	Late Jurassic	Shishugou Formation	China	A titanosauriform sauropod. The type species is F. qitaiensis.	
Galleonosaurus	Gen. et sp. nov	Valid	Herne et al.	Early Cretaceous (Barremian)	Wonthaggi Formation	Australia	A small-bodied ornithopod dinosaur. The type species is G. dorisae.	
Gnathovorax	Gen. et sp. nov	Valid	Pacheco et al.	Late Triassic (Carnian)	Santa Maria Formation	Brazil	A member of the family Herrerasauridae. The type species is G. cabreirai.	
Gobihadros	Gen. et sp. nov	Valid	Tsogtbaatar et al.	Late Cretaceous (Cenomanian–Santonian)	Bayan Shireh Formation	Mongolia	A non-hadrosaurid hadrosauroid ornithopod. The type species is G. mongoliensis.	
Gobiraptor	Gen. et sp. nov	Valid	Lee et al.	Late Cretaceous	Nemegt Formation	Mongolia	An oviraptorid theropod. The type species is G. minutus.	
Hesperornithoides	Gen. et sp. nov	Valid	Hartman et al.	Late Jurassic	Morrison Formation	United States (Wyoming)	A troodontid theropod. The type species is H. miessleri.	
Imperobator	Gen. et sp. nov	Valid	Ely & Case	Late Cretaceous (Maastrichtian)	Snow Hill Island Formation	Antarctica	A large paravian theropod. Genus includes new species I. antarcticus.	
Isasicursor	Gen. et sp. nov	Valid	Novas et al.	Late Cretaceous (Campanian-Maastrichtian)	Chorillo Formation	Argentina	An elasmarian ornithopod. The type species is I. santacrucensis.	
Itapeuasaurus	Gen. et sp. nov	Valid	Lindoso et al.	Late Cretaceous (Cenomanian)	Alcântara Formation	Brazil	A rebbachisaurid sauropod. The type species is I. cajapioensis.	
Jinbeisaurus	Gen. et sp. nov	Valid	Wu et al.	Late Cretaceous	Huiquanpu Formation	China	A tyrannosauroid theropod. Genus includes new species J. wangi. Announced in 2019; the final version of the article naming it was published in 2020.	
Kaijutitan	Gen. et sp. nov	Valid	Filippi, Salgado & Garrido	Late Cretaceous (Coniacian)	Sierra Barrosa Formation	Argentina	A basal member of Titanosauria. Genus includes new species K. maui.	
Kamuysaurus	Gen. et sp. nov	Valid	Kobayashi et al.	Late Cretaceous (early Maastrichtian)	Hakobuchi Formation	Japan	A member of Hadrosauridae belonging to the tribe Edmontosaurini. The type species is K. japonicus.	
Laiyangosaurus	Gen. et sp. nov	Valid	Zhang et al.	Late Cretaceous	Jingangkou Formation	China	A hadrosaurid ornithopod belonging to the subfamily Saurolophinae and the tribe Edmontosaurini. The type species is L. youngi. Announced in 2017; the final version of the article naming it was published in 2019.	
Lajasvenator	Gen. et sp. nov	Valid	Coria et al.	Early Cretaceous (Valanginian)	Mulichinco Formation	Argentina	A carcharodontosaurid theropod. Genus includes new species L. ascheriae. Announced in 2019; the final version of the article naming it is scheduled to be published in 2020.	
Lingyuanosaurus	Gen. et sp. nov		Yao et al.	Early Cretaceous	Jehol Group (Yixian Formation or Jiufotang Formation), possibly the former	China	An early member of Therizinosauria. The type species is L. sihedangensis.	
Mahuidacursor	Gen. et sp. nov	Valid	Cruzado-Caballero et al.	Late Cretaceous (Santonian)	Bajo de la Carpa Formation	Argentina	A basal ornithopod. Genus includes new species M. lipanglef.	
Moros	Gen. et sp. nov	Valid	Zanno et al.	Late Cretaceous (Cenomanian)	Cedar Mountain Formation	United States (Utah)	A tyrannosauroid theropod. The type species is M. intrepidus.	
Mnyamawamtuka	Gen. et sp. nov	Valid	Gorscak & O'Connor	Cretaceous (Aptian–Cenomanian)	Galula Formation	Tanzania	A lithostrotian titanosaur sauropod. The type species is M. moyowamkia.	
Nemegtonykus	Gen. et sp. nov		Lee et al.	Late Cretaceous	Nemegt Formation	Mongolia	An alvarezsaurid theropod. The type species is N. citus.	
Ngwevu	Gen. et sp. nov	Valid	Chapelle et al.	Early Jurassic (?Hettangian–?Sinemurian)	Elliot Formation	South Africa	A basal member of Sauropodomorpha. The type species is N. intloko.	
Nhandumirim	Gen. et sp. nov	Valid	Marsola et al.	Late Triassic (Carnian)	Santa Maria Formation	Brazil	An early dinosaur, possibly one of the earliest members of Theropoda. Genus includes new species N. waldsangae.	
Notatesseraeraptor	Gen. et sp. nov	Valid	Zahner & Brinkmann	Late Triassic (latest Norian)	Klettgau Formation	Switzerland	An early member of Neotheropoda with affinities to Dilophosaurus and Averostra. Genus includes new species N. frickensis.	
Nullotitan	Gen. et sp. nov	Valid	Novas et al.	Late Cretaceous (Campanian-Maastrichtian	Chorillo Formation	Argentina	A lithostrotian titanosaur. The type species is N. glaciaris.	
Oceanotitan	Gen. et sp. nov	Valid	Mocho, Royo-Torres & Ortega	Late Jurassic (late Kimmeridgian–early Tithonian)	Praia da Amoreira-Porto Novo Formation	Portugal	A titanosauriform sauropod. Genus includes new species O. dantasi.	
Pareisactus	Gen. et sp. nov	Valid	Párraga & Prieto-Márquez	Late Cretaceous (Maastrichtian)	Tremp Formation	Spain	A rhabdodontid ornithopod. The type species is P. evrostos.	
Phuwiangvenator	Gen. et sp. nov	Valid	Samathi, Chanthasit & Sander	Early Cretaceous (probably Barremian)	Sao Khua Formation	Thailand	A megaraptoran theropod. The type species is P. yaemniyomi.	
Pilmatueia	Gen. et sp. nov	Valid	Coria et al.	Early Cretaceous (Valanginian)	Mulichinco Formation	Argentina	A dicraeosaurid sauropod. The type species is P. faundezi. Announced in 2018; the final version of the article naming it was published in 2019.	
Psittacosaurus amitabha	Sp. nov	Valid	Napoli et al.	Early Cretaceous (Barremian)		Mongolia		
Sanxiasaurus	Gen. et sp. nov	Valid	Li et al.	Middle Jurassic	Xintiangou Formation	China	An early member of Neornithischia. Genus includes new species S. modaoxiensis.	
Sektensaurus	Gen. et sp. nov	Valid	Ibiricu et al.	Late Cretaceous (Coniacian-Maastrichtian)	Lago Colhue Huapi Formation	Argentina	A non-hadrosaurid ornithopod, probably a member of Elasmaria. Genus includes new species S. sanjuanboscoi.	
Shishugounykus	Gen. et sp. nov	Valid	Qin et al.	Middle-Late Jurassic	Shishugou Formation	China	An alvarezsaurian theropod. The type species is S. inexpectus.	
Siamraptor	Gen. et sp. nov	Valid	Chokchaloemwong et al.	Early Cretaceous (Aptian)	Khok Kruat Formation	Thailand	A theropod belonging to the group Carcharodontosauria. The type species is S. suwati.	
Suskityrannus	Gen. et sp. nov	Valid	Nesbitt et al.	Late Cretaceous (Turonian)	Moreno Hill Formation	United States (New Mexico)	A tyrannosauroid theropod. Genus includes new species S. hazelae.	
Tralkasaurus	Gen. et sp. nov	Valid	Cerroni et al.	Late Cretaceous (Cenomanian-Turonian)	Huincul Formation	Argentina	An abelisaurid theropod. Genus includes new species T. cuyi. Announced in 2019; the final version of the article naming it was published in 2020.	
Vallibonavenatrix	Gen. et sp. nov	Valid	Malafaia et al.	Early Cretaceous (Barremian)	Arcillas de Morella Formation	Spain	A spinosaurid theropod. Genus includes new species V. cani. Announced in 2019; the final version of the article naming it was published in 2020.	
Vayuraptor	Gen. et sp. nov	Valid	Samathi, Chanthasit & Sander	Early Cretaceous (probably Barremian)	Sao Khua Formation	Thailand	A basal member of Coelurosauria of uncertain exact phylogenetic placement within this group. The type species is V. nongbualamphuensis.	
Vespersaurus	Gen. et sp. nov		Langer et al.	Late Cretaceous	Rio Paraná Formation Botucatu Formation	Brazil	A noasaurid theropod. The type species is V. paranaensis.	
Wamweracaudia	Gen. et sp. nov	Valid	Mannion et al.	Late Jurassic	Tendaguru Formation	Tanzania	A mamenchisaurid sauropod. Genus includes new species W. keranjei.	
Xingtianosaurus	Gen. et sp. nov		Qiu et al.	Early Cretaceous	Yixian Formation	China	A caudipterid oviraptorosaur theropod. The type species is X. ganqi.	
Xunmenglong	Gen. et sp. nov	Valid	Xing et al.	Early Cretaceous	Huajiying Formation	China	A compsognathid theropod. Genus includes new species X. yinliangis. Announced in 2019; the final version of the article naming it was in 2020.	
Yamanasaurus	Gen. et sp. nov	Valid	Apesteguía et al.	Late Cretaceous	Río Playas Formation	Ecuador	A saltasaurine titanosaur. Genus includes new species Y. lojaensis. Announced in 2019; the final version of the article naming it was published in 2020.	

=== General non-avian dinosaur research ===
- A study aiming to identify the most likely area for the geographic origin of dinosaurs is published by Lee et al. (2019).
- A study evaluating the impact of new fossil discoveries and changing phylogenetic hypotheses on biogeographical scenarios for dinosaur origins is published by Marsola et al. (2019).
- A study aiming to determine the degree of differences of dinosaur phylogenies inferred from skull and postcranial characters is published online by Li, Ruta & Wills (2019).
- A study on the chronostratigraphic position of the uppermost Cretaceous dinosaur localities from south-western Europe, and on their implications for inferring the course of the Maastrichtian dinosaur turnover, is published by Fondevilla et al. (2019).
- A study aiming to quantify the habitat of latest Cretaceous North American dinosaurs, based on data from fossil occurrences and climatic and environmental modelling, and evaluating its implications for inferring whether dinosaur diversity was in decline prior to the Cretaceous–Paleogene extinction event, is published by Chiarenza et al. (2019).
- A study on factors determining the community richness of large herbivorous dinosaurs from the Campanian Dinosaur Park Formation (Alberta, Canada) is published by Mallon (2019).
- A review of the fossil record of Late Cretaceous non-avian dinosaurs from the James Ross Basin (Antarctica) is published by Lamanna et al. (2019), who also describe fragmentary new ankylosaur and ornithopod material from the Cape Lamb Member of the Snow Hill Island Formation and the Sandwich Bluff Member of the López de Bertodano Formation.
- A review and evaluation of studies on molecular data from Mesozoic dinosaur fossils is published by Schweitzer et al. (2019).
- A study on the nature of putative remains of ancient proteins, blood vessels, and cells preserved with dinosaur fossils, based on data from fossils of Centrosaurus apertus from the Dinosaur Park Formation (Alberta, Canada), is published by Saitta et al. (2019).
- A study on the olfactory bulb ratio (the size of the olfactory bulb relative to the cerebral hemisphere) in dinosaurs, and on its implication for inferring olfactory acuity of dinosaurs, is published by Hughes & Finarelli (2019).
- A study on vascular correlates in dinosaur skulls, evaluating their implications for the knowledge of thermoregulatory strategies of dinosaurs of different sizes, is published online by Porter & Witmer (2019).
- A review of the diversity of the musculature of the skulls of herbivorous dinosaurs is published online by Nabavizadeh (2019).
- A study on the evolution of different modes of herbivory in non-avian dinosaurs is published online by Button & Zanno (2019).
- A study on the structure of eggshells of eggs produced by Lufengosaurus, Massospondylus and Mussaurus, representing the oldest confirmed amniote eggshells reported so far, is published by Stein et al. (2019).
- Description of dinosaur egg fossils from the late Early Cretaceous Chaochuan Formation (Zhejiang, China) is published by Zhang et al. (2019), who name a new ootaxon Multifissoolithus chianensis.
- Dinosaurs eggs assigned to the oofamily Dendroolithidae are described from the Late Cretaceous Zhaoying Formation (China) by He et al. (2019), who name a new ootaxon Pionoolithus quyuangangensis.
- Dinosaurs eggs assigned to the oofamily Faveoloolithidae are described from the Upper Cretaceous (Coniacian–Santonian) siltstones within the Daeri Andesite of the Wido Volcanics (South Korea) by Kim et al. (2019), who name a new ootaxon Propagoolithus widoensis.
- Possible dromaeosaurid eggshells are described from the Upper Cretaceous Wido Volcanics (South Korea) by Choi & Lee (2019), who name a new ootaxon Reticuloolithus acicularis.
- Description of an intact dinosaur egg from the Cretaceous Wayan Formation (Idaho, United States) assigned to the oogenus Macroelongatoolithus is published by Simon et al. (2019), who interpret this specimen as evidence of presence of a Gigantoraptor-sized oviraptorosaur in western North America.
- A study on the embryonic metabolism of Troodon formosus, Protoceratops andrewsi and Hypacrosaurus stebingeri, and on its implications for the knowledge of the incubation times for dinosaur eggs, is published by Lee (2019).
- A new dinosaur nesting site, preserving at least 15 egg clutches probably laid by a non-avian theropod dinosaur, is described from the Upper Cretaceous Javkhlant Formation (Mongolia) by Tanaka et al. (2019), who interpret the finding as evidence of colonial nesting in a non-avian dinosaur.
- A study aiming to determine possible shifts from quadrupedality to bipedality during ontogeny in dinosaurs is published online by Chapelle et al. (2019).
- A review of evidence of probable responses of dinosaurs to serious injuries is presented by Hearn & Williams (2019).
- A study on the phylogenetic placement of Chilesaurus diegosuarezi and its implications for the phylogenetic relationships of major dinosaur groups is published by Müller & Dias-da-Silva (2019).

=== Saurischian research ===
==== Theropod research ====
- A study on specimen completeness in the fossil record of non-avian theropod dinosaurs is published by Cashmore & Butler (2019).
- A study on the distribution of discrete dental characters in theropod dinosaurs, and on the taxonomic value of theropod teeth, is published by Hendrickx et al. (2019).
- A study aiming to evaluate whether the maximum body size of theropod dinosaurs increased across the Triassic-Jurassic boundary is published online by Griffin & Nesbitt (2019).
- A revision of theropod dinosaur fossils from the Late Jurassic to mid-Cretaceous of Southeast Asia is published by Samathi, Chanthasit & Sander (2019).
- Description of theropod dinosaur teeth from the Lower Cretaceous (Barremian-Aptian) Ilek Formation (West Siberia, Russia) is published by Averianov, Ivantsov & Skutschas (2019).
- A study re-assessing the evidence for evolutionary allometric trends in the forelimbs of non-avian theropod dinosaurs is published by Palma Liberona et al. (2019).
- Redescription of the holotype specimen of Chindesaurus bryansmalli and a study on the phylogenetic relationships of this species is published by Marsh et al. (2019).
- Description of two fragmentary neotheropod specimens from the Upper Triassic Bull Canyon Formation (New Mexico, United States), and a study on their implications for the knowledge of body size evolution among early theropods, is published by Griffin (2019).
- A study on the anatomy of the braincase, the skull endocast and the inner ear of Zupaysaurus rougieri is published by Paulina-Carabajal, Ezcurra & Novas (2019).
- A study on range of motion and functions of the forelimbs of Dilophosaurus wetherilli is published by Senter & Sullivan (2019).
- A study on the paleobiology of Cryolophosaurus is published by Yun (2019).
- A study on tooth formation and replacement rates in Majungasaurus, Ceratosaurus and Allosaurus is published by D'Emic et al. (2019).
- A study on the ecology of Ceratosaurus is published by Yun (2019).
- A study on the phylogenetic relationships of Afromimus tenerensis is published by Cerroni et al. (2019), who consider this taxon to be more likely an abelisauroid rather than an ornithomimosaur.
- Description of isolated neck vertebrae of abelisauroid theropods from the Cretaceous Kem Kem Beds (Morocco) and a study on the phylogenetic affinities of these fossils is published online by Smyth et al. (2019).
- Partially preserved ilium of an indeterminate abelisaur theropod is reported from the Upper Cretaceous Kem Kem Beds (Morocco) by Zitouni et al. (2019); however Smyth et al. (2019) reinterpret this specimen as a fossil of Spinosaurus aegyptiacus, while Samathi (2024) reinterprets this bone as a fossil of a spinosaurine spinosaurid of uncertain generic placement, possibly distinct from S. aegyptiacus.
- A study on the anatomy of the brain, braincase and inner ear of Carnotaurus sastrei is published by Cerroni & Paulina-Carabajal (2019).
- A study on the phylogenetic affinities of a tooth previously considered to be part of the holotype of Aerosteon riocoloradensis is published online by Hendrickx, Tschopp & Ezcurra (2019), who consider this fossil to be an abelisaurid tooth.
- Megalosaurid teeth resembling teeth of Torvosaurus are described from the Upper Jurassic of Uruguay and Tanzania by Soto, Toriño & Perea (2019).
- Isolated spinosaurid teeth are described from the Lower Cretaceous of Kut Island (Thailand) by Buffetaut et al. (2019).
- New spinosaurid specimens are described from the Kem Kem Beds (Morocco) by Arden et al. (2019), who interpret these specimens as providing evidence of aquatic adaptations in the skulls of spinosaurids, and name a new clade Spinosaurini; the study is subsequently criticized by Hone & Holtz (2019).
- New fossil material of juvenile spinosaurids is described from the Kem Kem Beds by Lakin & Longrich (2019).
- New theropod fossils, including partial tail vertebra of a member of Megaraptora and an association of tail vertebrae and pelvic elements displaying a combination of characteristics that are present in megaraptorid and carcharodontosaurid theropods, are described from the early Late Cretaceous Griman Creek Formation at Lightning Ridge, New South Wales (Australia) by Brougham, Smith & Bell (2019).
- Partial postcranial skeleton of a probable carcharodontosaurian theropod is described from the Upper Jurassic (Tithonian) Freixial Formation (Portugal) by Malafaia et al. (2019).
- Description of the anatomy of the axial skeleton of Concavenator corcovatus is published by Cuesta, Ortega & Sanz (2019).
- A study on the anatomy of the brain and inner ear of Giganotosaurus carolinii is published online by Paulina-Carabajal & Nieto (2019).
- A study on the anatomy of Murusraptor barrosaensis, and on its implications for inferring the phylogenetic placement of megaraptorans within Theropoda, is published by Rolando, Novas & Agnolín (2019).
- New fossil material of a megaraptorid belonging or related to the species Australovenator wintonensis is described from the Lower Cretaceous (Albian) Eric the Red West site (Eumeralla Formation; Victoria, Australia) by Poropat et al. (2019).
- A study comparing different methods of assessing morphological diversity of coelurosaurian mandibles is published online by Schaeffer et al. (2019).
- A study on the anatomy of the skull of Bicentenaria argentina is published online by Aranciaga-Rolando, Cerroni & Novas (2019).
- New postcranial bones of Kileskus aristotocus, providing new information on the anatomy of this species, are described from the Middle Jurassic (Itat Formation) Itat Formation (Russia) by Averianov et al. (2019).
- A study on the agility and turning capability of tyrannosaurids and other large theropods is published by Snively et al. (2019), who argue that tyrannosaurids could turn with greater agility, thus pivoting more quickly, than other large theropods, which enhanced their ability to pursue and subdue prey.
- A study on the taxonomic identity of the tyrannosaurid specimen CMN 11315 from the lower Maastrichtian Tolman Member of the Horseshoe Canyon Formation (Alberta, Canada) is published online by Mallon et al. (2019).
- A study on the taxonomic identity of the juvenile tyrannosaurid specimen TMP 1994.143.1, formerly assigned to the genus Daspletosaurus, is published by Voris et al., who reinterpret this specimen as belonging to the species Gorgosaurus libratus, and describe a new postorbital from the Dinosaur Park Formation (Alberta, Canada) belonging to a small juvenile Daspletosaurus.
- A study on the tooth replacement patterns in tyrannosaurid theropods, as indicated by data from a juvenile specimen of Tarbosaurus bataar, is published by Hanai & Tsuihiji (2019).
- A study on teeth of Tarbosaurus bataar and its potential prey species from the Nemegt Formation (Mongolia), aiming to infer the diet of this dinosaur and seasonal climatic variations in the area of Mongolia in the early Maastrichtian on the basis of stable isotope data from tooth enamel, is published online by Owocki et al. (2019).
- A study on the complexity and modularity of the skull of Tyrannosaurus rex is published by Werneburg et al. (2019).
- Traces preserved on a tail vertebra of a hadrosaurid dinosaur from the Upper Cretaceous Hell Creek Formation (Montana, United States) are described by Peterson & Daus (2019), who interpret their finding as feeding traces produced by a late-stage juvenile Tyrannosaurus rex.
- A large specimen of Tyrannosaurus rex (RSM P2523.8) with an estimated body mass exceeding other known T. rex specimens and representatives of all other gigantic terrestrial theropods is described by Persons, Currie & Erickson (2019).
- A study testing the biomechanical performance of the skull of Tyrannosaurus rex is published online by Cost et al. (2019).
- A study on tooth replacement in a well-preserved skull of Tyrannosaurus rex from the Maastrichtian Hell Creek Formation (Montana, United States) is published online by Sattler & Schwarz (2019).
- A study aiming to determine the processes contributing to the preservation of soft tissue structures and proteins of Tyrannosaurus rex is published by Boatman et al. (2019).
- Teeth on a (probably non-tyrannosaurid) tyrannosauroid and a dromaeosaurid are described from the Maastrichtian Mount Laurel Formation (New Jersey, United States) by Brownstein (2019).
- Description of an ornithomimid specimen UALVP 16182, putatively assigned to the genus Dromiceiomimus, and a study on the validity of this genus is published by Macdonald & Currie (2019).
- A study on the morphometrics of teeth of Richardoestesia asiatica from the Upper Cretaceous Khodzhakul, Bissekty and Aitym formations of Uzbekistan is published by Averianov & Sues (2019).
- A study on the bone histology of a metatarsal bone of the holotype specimen of Xixianykus zhangi is published by Qin, Zhao & Xu (2019).
- A study on the anatomy of the skull of Beipiaosaurus inexpectus is published by Liao & Xu (2019).
- A study on form, function and evolution of skulls of members of Oviraptorosauria is published online by Ma et al. (2019).
- A study on the wing performance of Caudipteryx is published by Talori et al. (2019).
- A study on the aerodynamic capacity of feathered forelimbs of Caudipteryx is published by Talori & Zhao (2019).
- Description of an avimimid bonebed assemblage from the Iren Dabasu Formation of northern China, providing new information on the growth of avimimids, is published by Funston et al. (2019).
- Description of new caenagnathid mandibles from the Dinosaur Park Formation (Alberta, Canada) and a study on their histology is published online by Funston et al. (2019).
- A reconstruction of the architecture of the oviraptorid egg clutch, based on data from five clutches from the Upper Cretaceous Nanxiong Group (Jiangxi, China) is presented by Yang et al. (2019), who re-evaluate the hypothesis of thermoregulatory contact incubation of eggs as an explanation for the discoveries of associations of adult oviraptorosaurs with egg clutches.
- A study on the reproductive biology of oviraptorids, based on data from a partial clutch of eggs from the Upper Cretaceous Nanxiong Group, is published online by Yang et al. (2019).
- A study on the function of the enlarged "sickle claw" on the second toe of dromaeosaurid theropods is published by Bishop (2019).
- An ungual phalanx of a dromaeosaurid theropod is described from the Blagoveshchensk area (Russia) by Bolotskii, Bolotskii & Sorokin (2019).
- A study on the anatomy, taphonomy, environmental setting and phylogenetic position of Halszkaraptor escuilliei is published by Brownstein (2019); the study is subsequently criticized by Cau (2020).
- A study on a fossil lizard found in the abdomen of a specimen of Microraptor zhaoianus from the Lower Cretaceous Jiufotang Formation (China), evaluating its implications for the knowledge of dromaeosaurid digestion, is published by O'Connor et al. (2019).
- Description of the anatomy of the skull of Saurornitholestes langstoni, based on data from an almost complete skeleton from the Campanian Dinosaur Park Formation (Alberta, Canada), is published online by Currie & Evans (2019).
- Histological analysis of the forelimb bones of Daliansaurus liaoningensis is presented by Shen et al. (2019).
- Evidence indicating that the pennaceous feathers of Anchiornis were composed of both feather β-keratins and α-keratins is presented by Pan et al. (2019); the study is subsequently criticized by Saitta & Vinther (2019).
- Isolated theropod teeth, interpreted as most likely representing at least two species, are described from the Middle Jurassic Valtos Sandstone and Lealt Shale Formations of Skye (Scotland) by Young et al. (2019).

==== Sauropodomorph research ====
- A study aiming to explain high diversity of early evolutionary branches of sauropodomorph dinosaurs is published online by Müller & Garcia (2019).
- A study on the anatomy and phylogenetic relationships of Pampadromaeus barberenai is published by Langer et al. (2019).
- A dinosauriform femur, possibly of a juvenile specimen of the species Pampadromaeus barberenai, is described from the Late Triassic of southern Brazil by Müller et al. (2019).
- A study on the anatomy of the braincase of Saturnalia tupiniquim is published by Bronzati, Langer & Rauhut (2019).
- Description of all available skull bones of Saturnalia tupiniquim except the braincase, evaluating the implications of this taxon for the knowledge of the early evolution of the sauropodomorph feeding behaviour, is published by Bronzati, Müller & Langer (2019).
- A study on the phylogenetic relationships of Unaysaurus tolentinoi is published online by McPhee et al. (2019).
- A study on the anatomy of the skull of Macrocollum itaquii and on the phylogenetic relationships of this species is published online by Müller (2019).
- A study on the bony labyrinth scale and geometry through ontogeny in Massospondylus carinatus, evaluating whether the putative gait change from quadrupedal juvenile to bipedal adult is reflected in labyrinth morphology, will be published by Neenan et al. (2019).
- Description of the anatomy of the postcranial skeleton of the neotype specimen of Massospondylus carinatus is published by Barrett et al. (2019).
- Redescription of the anatomy of the skull of Jingshanosaurus xinwaensis is published online by Zhang et al. (2019), who consider Chuxiongosaurus lufengensis to be a junior synonym of J. xinwaensis.
- A study on the anatomy of the axial skeleton of Xingxiulong chengi is published online by Wang et al. (2019).
- A study on changes of body mass and center of mass of Mussaurus patagonicus during its ontogeny, and on their potential relationship with the locomotor stance of this dinosaur, is published by Otero et al. (2019).
- A study on the leverage of forelimb muscles in the transition from the narrow-gauge stance of basal sauropods to a wide-gauge stance in titanosaurs is published by Klinkhamer et al. (2019).
- A study on the hind foot posture and biomechanical capabilities of Rhoetosaurus brownei is published by Jannel et al. (2019).
- A study on the age of the fossils of Rhoetosaurus brownei is published by Todd et al. (2019).
- An isolated tooth-crown of a member of Eusauropoda, possibly a member of Mamenchisauridae or Euhelopodidae, is described from the Upper Jurassic Qigu Formation (China) by Maisch & Matzke (2019), representing the first record of a eusauropod from this formation reported so far.
- A cervical vertebra of a member of the genus Omeisaurus is described from the Middle Jurassic Lower Member of the Shaximiao Formation (China) by Tan et al. (2019), providing new information on the skeletal morphology of this genus, and representing the easternmost occurrence of Omeisaurus reported so far.
- Possible mamenchisaurid teeth are described from the Middle Jurassic Itat Formation (Russia) by Averianov et al. (2019).
- A study on the age of the fossils of members of the genus Mamenchisaurus from the Suining Formation in the Sichuan Basin (China) is published by Wang et al. (2019).
- A study on the anatomy and affinities of Lapparentosaurus madagascariensis is published by Raveloson, Clark & Rasoamiaramana (2019).
- Partial vertebra of a sauropod dinosaur belonging to the group Turiasauria is described from the Lower Cretaceous Wealden Supergroup (United Kingdom) by Mannion (2019).
- Description and a study on the affinities of sauropod teeth from the Middle Jurassic (Bathonian) Sakahara Formation (Madagascar) is published online by Bindellini & Dal Sasso (2019), who report evidence of presence of Titanosauriformes in the Bathonian.
- Description of isolated sauropod vertebrae from the Oxford Clay Formation (United Kingdom), indicative of a higher sauropod biodiversity in this formation than previously recognised, is published by Holwerda, Evans & Liston (2019).
- Revision of the taxonomic diversity of sauropod dinosaurs from a historic Carnegie Museum locality (Red Fork of the Powder River Quarry B) in northern Wyoming (Morrison Formation) is published by Tschopp et al. (2019).
- A study on pneumatic structures in the vertebrae of Pilmatueia faundezi is published online by Windholz, Coria & Zurriaguz (2019).
- A study on the anatomy of the appendicular skeleton of Europasaurus holgeri and on the phylogenetic relationships of this species is published online by Carballido et al. (2019).
- Redescription of brachiosaurid fossil material from the Upper Jurassic Morrison Formation (Colorado, United States), including a mostly complete skull discovered in 1883, is published online by D'Emic & Carrano (2019).
- A study on the phylogenetic relationships of Galvesaurus herreroi is published by Pérez-Pueyo et al. (2019).
- A study on the phylogenetic relationships of the Late Jurassic sauropod dinosaurs from the Tendaguru Formation of Tanzania (Australodocus bohetii, Janenschia robusta and Tendaguria tanzaniensis) is published by Mannion et al. (2019).
- The first confirmed fossil of a sauropod dinosaur from Ethiopia (an isolated tooth) is reported from the Upper Jurassic Mugher Mudstone by Goodwin et al. (2019).
- A study on the affinities of the sauropod dinosaur known from an isolated metacarpal from the Upper Jurassic (Oxfordian) Jagua Formation (Cuba) is published online by Apesteguía, Izquierdo & Iturralde-Vinent (2019).
- A study on isolated sauropod teeth from the Early Cretaceous Teete locality (Batylykh Formation) (Yakutia, Russia), representing the northernmost sauropod record in the Northern Hemisphere reported so far, is published online by Averianov et al. (2019).
- Redescription of Jiangshanosaurus lixianensis, a study on the anatomy of Dongyangosaurus sinensis and a study on the phylogenetic relationships of these species is published by Mannion et al. (2019).
- New fossil material of titanosauriform sauropods is described from the Upper Cretaceous Daijiaping Formation (Hunan, China) by Han et al. (2019).
- A study on the long bone histology in early juvenile titanosaur sauropods, evaluating its implications for the knowledge of early stages of development of these dinosaurs, is published online by González et al. (2019).
- A study on the neurology and phylogenetic affinities of a titanosaurian braincase from the Campanian locality of Fox-Amphoux-Métisson (southeastern France) is published by Knoll et al. (2019).
- Tail vertebrae of lithostrotian titanosaurs are described from the Lower Cretaceous Ilek Formation (Krasnoyarsk Krai, Russia) by Averianov, Ivantsov & Skutschas (2019).
- A study on the anatomy of the appendicular skeleton of South American titanosaur sauropods and on its implications for the knowledge of the phylogenetic relationships of these sauropods is published by González Riga et al. (2019), who name a new clade Colossosauria.
- Description of titanosaur sauropod vertebrae from the Upper Cretaceous Lameta Formation (India) is published by Wilson et al. (2019).
- Description of the anatomy of the braincase of Malawisaurus dixeyi is published by Andrzejewski et al. (2019), who present digital reconstructions of the endocast and inner ear of this species based on CT scanning.
- A study on the anatomy and phylogenetic relationships of Uberabatitan ribeiroi is published by Silva et al. (2019).
- A study on vertebral pneumaticity in Uberabatitan ribeiroi, indicating that diagenesis can obliterate traces of bone pneumaticity, is published online by Aureliano et al. (2019).
- Fossils of a titanosaur sauropod related to Rapetosaurus and the indeterminate Italian titanosaur specimen MSNM V7157 are described from the Algora vertebrate fossil site located in the Cenomanian strata of the Arenas de Utrillas Formation (Spain) by Mocho et al. (2019).
- Description of five articulated sauropod dorsal vertebrae from the Upper Cretaceous Nemegt Formation, possibly belonging to the species Nemegtosaurus mongoliensis, is published by Averianov & Lopatin (2019), who also study the anatomy of sauropod femora from the Nemegt Formation, and argue that N. mongoliensis is likely to be distinct from Opisthocoelicaudia skarzynskii.

=== Ornithischian research ===
- A study on the evolution of the femoral fourth trochanter in ornithischian dinosaurs is published online by Persons & Currie (2019).
- A study on the taphonomy and histology of the ornithischian (ankylosaurian and ornithopod) fossils from the La Cantalera-1 site (Lower Cretaceous Blesa Formation, Spain) is published by Perales-Gogenola et al. (2019).

==== Thyreophoran research ====
- Studies on the anatomy of the skull and postcranial skeleton of Scelidosaurus harrisonii are published online by Norman (2019).
- A study on the holotype specimen of Bienosaurus lufengensis, and on the taxonomic validity and phylogenetic relationships of this dinosaur, is published by Raven et al. (2019).
- A study on the morphological diversity of stegosaurs through the evolutionary history of the group is published by Romano (2019).
- Two new stegosaurian specimens from the northernmost outcrops of the Morrison Formation in Montana, one of which is the northernmost occurrence of a dinosaur from the Morrison Formation reported so far, are described by Woodruff, Trexler & Maidment (2019).
- Description of a new specimen of Miragaia longicollum and a study on the taxonomic validity and phylogenetic relationships of this species is published by Costa & Mateus (2019), who transfer the species Alcovasaurus longispinus to the genus Miragaia.
- Plates of an armored dinosaur from the Lower Jurassic (Sinemurian-Pliensbachian) Lower Kota Formation (India) are redescribed by Galton (2019), who considers these fossils to be more similar to plates of ankylosaurians than basal thyreophorans, and interprets them as the earliest ankylosaurian fossils reported so far.
- Description of an assemblage of 12 partial, articulated or associated ankylosaurian skeletons and thousands of isolated bones and teeth from the Cretaceous (Santonian) Iharkút vertebrate locality (Hungary) will be published by Ősi et al. (2019).
- A study on the evolution of morphological traits associated with tail weaponry in ankylosaurs and glyptodonts, aiming to quantitatively test the hypothesis that tail weaponry of these groups is an example of convergent evolution, is published online by Arbour & Zanno (2019).
- Murray, Riguetti & Rozadilla (2019) describe ankylosaur osteoderms from the Upper Cretaceous (Campanian-Maastrichtian) Allen Formation (Argentina).
- Description of three new skull specimens of Talarurus plicatospineus from the Upper Cretaceous (Cenomanian–Santonian) Bayan Shireh Formation (Mongolia), and a study on the phylogenetic relationships of this species, is published online by Park et al. (2019).
- Evidence for sexual dimorphism in Tianzhenosaurus youngi is presented by Ma (2019).
- A study on the brain morphology and topography of cranial nerves of Bissektipelta archibaldi is published by Alifanov & Saveliev (2019).
- A study on the bone histology of the holotype specimen of Antarctopelta oliveroi and on its implication for the knowledge of paleobiology of this species is published by Cerda et al. (2019).

==== Cerapod research ====
- A study on the age of the Kulinda locality (south-eastern Siberia, Russia) which yielded fossils of Kulindadromeus zabaikalicus is published by Cincotta et al. (2019).
- First photogrammetric models of the type locality burrow of Oryctodromeus cubicularis are presented by Wilson & Varricchio (2019).
- A study on the taphonomy of fossils of Oryctodromeus cubicularis is published by Krumenacker et al. (2019), who also report discovery of new burrows of this dinosaur.
- New fossil material of ornithopod dinosaurs is described from the Cretaceous Flat Rocks locality (Wonthaggi Formation, Australia) by Herne et al. (2019), who also revise Qantassaurus intrepidus and study the phylogenetic relationships of the Victorian ornithopods.
- Two minuscule ornithopod femora, likely belonging to individuals around the point of hatching, are described from the Cenomanian Griman Creek Formation (Australia) by Kitchener et al. (2019).
- Description of new fossil material of large ornithopod dinosaurs from the Lower Cretaceous localities in El Castellar (Maestrazgo Basin, Teruel, Spain), and a study on the implications of these fossils for the knowledge of ornithopod diversity in the Lower Cretaceous of the Iberian Peninsula, is published by Verdú et al. (2019).
- Description of the anatomy of the skeleton of Talenkauen santacrucensis is published by Rozadilla, Agnolín & Novas (2019).
- A study on the anatomy of the skeleton of Macrogryphosaurus gondwanicus is published online by Rozadilla, Cruzado-Caballero & Calvo (2019).
- Skeletal pathologies affecting a subadult specimen of Tenontosaurus tilletti from the Antlers Formation of southeastern Oklahoma are described by Hunt et al. (2019).
- A study on the anatomy and phylogenetic relationships of the ornithopod dinosaurs from the Maastrichtian of Crimea, including Riabininohadros weberae, is published by Averianov & Lopatin (2019).
- Redescription of the fossil material of Orthomerus dolloi and a study on the phylogenetic affinities of this taxon is published online by Madzia, Jagt & Mulder (2019).
- A study on patterns and processes of morphological evolution of hadrosauroid dinosaurs is published by Stubbs et al. (2019).
- A study on the nature of the fluvial systems of Laramidia during the Late Cretaceous, as indicated by data from vertebrate and invertebrate fossils from the Kaiparowits Formation of southern Utah, and on the behavior of hadrosaurid dinosaurs over these landscapes, will be published by Crystal et al. (2019).
- Evidence of three-dimensional preservation of eumelanin-bearing bodies, dermal cells and blood vessel fragments in a hadrosaur specimen YPMPU 016969 is presented by Fabbri et al. (2019).
- A study on the osteology and phylogenetic relationships of "Tanius laiyangensis" is published online by Zhang et al. (2019).
- A study on the bone histology of tibiae of Maiasaura peeblesorum, focusing on the composition, frequency and cortical extent of localized vascular changes, is published by Woodward (2019).
- A study on hadrosaurine skulls from the Dinosaur Park Formation (Alberta, Canada), aiming to assess the influence of ontogeny on skull morphology, and evaluating proposed synonymy between Gryposaurus incurvimanus and G. notabilis, is published online by Lowi-Merri & Evans (2019).
- Three juvenile specimens of Prosaurolophus maximus, providing new information on the ontogeny of this taxon, are described from the Bearpaw Formation (Alberta, Canada) by Drysdale et al. (2019).
- A study on the structure and contents of a large piece of amber attached to a jaw of a specimen of Prosaurolophus maximus from the Cretaceous Dinosaur Park Formation (Alberta, Canada), evaluating the implications of this finding for the knowledge of the habitat and taphonomy of the dinosaur, is published by McKellar et al. (2019).
- A study on the impact of bone tissue structure, early diagenetic regimes and other taphonomic variables on the preservation potential of soft tissues in vertebrate fossils, as indicated by data from fossils of Edmontosaurus annectens from the Standing Rock Hadrosaur Site (Maastrichtian Hell Creek Formation, South Dakota), is published by Ullmann, Pandya & Nellermoe (2019), who report the first recovery of osteocytes and vessels from a fossil vertebral centrum and ossified tendons.
- A femur of an early juvenile hadrosaurid, probably belonging to the species Edmontosaurus annectens, is described from the Hell Creek Formation (Montana, United States) by Farke & Yip (2019), providing new information on ontogenetic changes in the skeleton of this dinosaur.
- Skull remains of nestling-sized hadrosaurids, probably belonging to the species Edmontosaurus annectens, are described from the Hell Creek Formation (Montana, United States) by Wosik, Goodwin & Evans (2019).
- A study of three-dimensionally preserved squamous skin of a member of the genus Edmontosaurus from the Upper Cretaceous (Campanian) Wapiti Formation (Alberta, Canada) is published by Barbi et al. (2019).
- The first definitive lambeosaurine fossil (an isolated skull bone) is described from the Liscomb Bonebed of the Prince Creek Formation (Alaska, United States) by Takasaki et al. (2019).
- Fossils of a lambeosaurine related to the Eurasian Tsintaosaurini are described from the lower Maastrichtian of the Els Nerets locality (eastern Tremp Syncline, northeastern Spain) by Conti et al. (2019).
- A study on the microwear of hadrosaur teeth from the La Parrita locality (Cerro del Pueblo Formation, Mexico) and on its implications for the knowledge of jaw mechanics and feeding ecology of these hadrosaurs is published by Rivera-Sylva et al. (2019).
- A study on bone histology of Psittacosaurus lujiatunensis through its ontogeny is published by Zhao et al. (2019).
- A study on the morphological changes in the braincase of Psittacosaurus lujiatunensis through its ontogeny, based on data from three specimens from the Lower Cretaceous Yixian Formation (China), is published by Bullar et al. (2019).
- A three-dimensional virtual endocast of a member of the genus Auroraceratops is reconstructed on the basis of a well-preserved skull by Zhang et al. (2019).
- Studies on the preservation of fossils of Auroraceratops rugosus, on their stratigraphic provenance, and on the anatomy and phylogenetic relationships of this species are published by Suarez et al. (2019), Suarez et al. (2019), Morschhauser et al. (2019), Li et al. (2019), Morschhauser et al. (2019) and Morschhauser et al. (2019).
- A study on the nature of the observed variation in morphology and size of skulls of Bagaceratops rozhdestvenskyi is published online by Czepiński (2019), who considers the species Gobiceratops minutus, Lamaceratops tereschenkoi, Platyceratops tatarinovi and Magnirostris dodsoni to be junior synonyms of B. rozhdestvenskyi.
- The first postcranial skeleton of Bagaceratops reported so far is described from the Upper Cretaceous Barun Goyot Formation (Mongolia) by Kim, Yun & Lee (2019).
- A study on the anatomy of the appendicular skeleton of Protoceratops andrewsi and on its implications for the knowledge of the locomotor abilities of this species throughout its ontogeny is published by Słowiak, Tereshchenko & Fostowicz-Frelik (2019).
- A study on the bone histology and skeletal growth of Avaceratops and Yehuecauhceratops is published online by Hedrick et al. (2019).
- New information on the anatomy of the skeleton of Pachyrhinosaurus perotorum is presented by Tykoski, Fiorillo & Chiba (2019), who also provide a new diagnosis of this species.
- A study on the morphological variation of the skulls of specimens of Styracosaurus albertensis is published online by Holmes et al. (2019).
- A study on the affinities of two chasmosaurine skulls from the Dinosaur Park Formation (Alberta, Canada), previously referred to the species Chasmosaurus belli, is published by Campbell et al. (2019), who transfer the species Vagaceratops irvinensis to the genus Chasmosaurus, and consider the two studied skulls to be fossils of members of the genus Chasmosaurus of uncertain specific assignment, with morphology intermediate between C. belli and C. irvinensis.
- A study on the taphonomy of hadrosaurid and ceratopsid fossils from the Scabby Butte locality (St. Mary River Formation; Alberta, Canada) is published online by Campbell, Ryan & Anderson (2019).
- A study on the taxonomic status of Teyuwasu barberenai, in which it was proposed as a second specimen of the herrerasaurid Staurikosaurus pricei rather than a separate genus and species, is published by Garcia, Müller & Dias-da-Silva (2019).
- A study on a putative sauropodomorph ilium, from Carnian rocks of the Candelária Sequence/Santa Maria Formation (Brazil), aims to discuss muscle attachment scars, in the context of ontogeny and phylogeny of basal dinosauriforms, focusing in saturnaliine sauropodomorphs is published by Garcia et al. (2019).

== Birds ==
=== New bird taxa ===
Name	Novelty	Status	Authors	Age	Type locality	Country	Notes	Images
Alcmonavis	Gen. et sp. nov	Valid	Rauhut, Tischlinger & Foth	Late Jurassic (Tithonian)	Mörnsheim Formation	Germany	A basal member of Avialae, more closely related to extant birds than to Archaeopteryx. The type species is A. poeschli.	
Aldiomedes	Gen. et sp. nov	Valid	Mayr & Tennyson	Late Pliocene	Tangahoe Formation	New Zealand	An albatross. The type species is A. angustirostris. Announced in 2019; the final version of the article naming it was published in 2020.	
Antarcticavis	Gen. et sp. nov	Valid	Cordes-Person et al.	Late Cretaceous (Maastrichtian)	Snow Hill Island Formation	Antarctica	A bird of uncertain phylogenetic placement, possibly a member of Ornithuromorpha belonging to the group Ornithurae. The type species is A. capelambensis. Announced in 2019; the final version of the article naming it was published in 2020.	
Archaeopteryx albersdoerferi	Sp. nov	Valid	Kundrát et al.	Late Jurassic (Tithonian)	Mörnsheim Formation	Germany		
Avimaia	Gen. et sp. nov	Valid	Bailleul et al.	Early Cretaceous (Aptian)	Xiagou Formation	China	A member of Enantiornithes. The type species is A. schweitzerae. Noted as the first discovered fossil bird with an unlaid egg.	
Camptodontornis	Nom. nov	Valid	Demirjian	Early Cretaceous	Jiufotang Formation	China	A member of Enantiornithes; a replacement name for Camptodontus Li et al. (2010).	
Carpathiavis	Gen. et sp. nov	Valid	Mayr	Oligocene (Rupelian)	Menilite beds	Poland	A small bird of uncertain phylogenetic placement. The type species is C. meniliticus.	
Cherevychnavis	Gen. et sp. nov	Valid	Bocheński et al.	Miocene (Tortonian)		Ukraine	A member of Charadrii, approximately the size of extant Eurasian oystercatcher. The type species is C. umanskae	
Conflicto	Gen. et sp. nov	Valid	Tambussi et al.	Early Paleocene	López de Bertodano Formation	Antarctica	A stem-anseriform. Genus includes new species C. antarcticus.	
Coturnix alabrevis	Sp. nov	Valid	Rando et al.	Late Quaternary		Madeira (Porto Santo Island)	A species of Coturnix.	
Coturnix centensis	Sp. nov	Valid	Rando et al.	Late Quaternary		Cape Verde	A species of Coturnix.	
Coturnix lignorum	Sp. nov	Valid	Rando et al.	Late Quaternary		Madeira (Madeira Island)	A species of Coturnix.	
?Crossvallia waiparensis	Sp. nov	Valid	Mayr et al.	Paleocene	Waipara Greensand	New Zealand	A large-sized penguin. Announced in 2019; the final version of the article naming it was published in 2020.	
Dasyornis walterbolesi	Sp. nov	Valid	Nguyen	Early Miocene	Riversleigh World Heritage Area	Australia	A bristlebird.	
Dromaius arleyekweke	Sp. nov	Valid	Yates & Worthy	Late Miocene	Waite Formation	Australia	A relative of the emu.	
Dryolimnas chekei	Sp. nov	Valid	Hume	Holocene	Mare aux Songes	Mauritius	A rail.	
Ducula shutleri	Sp. nov	Valid	Worthy & Burley	Holocene		Tonga	An imperial pigeon.	
Elektorornis	Gen. et sp. nov	Valid	Xing et al.	Cretaceous (late Albian-Cenomanian)	Burmese amber	Myanmar	A member of Enantiornithes. The type species is E. chenguangi.	
Eofringillirostrum	Gen. et 2 sp. nov	Valid	Ksepka, Mayr & Grande	Early Eocene	Green River Formation; Messel pit	Germany; United States (Wyoming)	A member of Pan-Passeriformes related to Psittacopes. The type species is E. boudreauxi; genus also includes E. parvulum.	
Eudyptes warhami	Sp. nov	Valid	Cole et al.	Holocene		New Zealand	A crested penguin.	
Fukuipteryx	Gen. et sp. nov	Valid	Imai et al.	Early Cretaceous (Aptian)	Kitadani Formation	Japan	A basal member of Avialae. The type species is F. prima .	
Geronticus thackerayi	Sp. nov	Valid	Pavia	Plio-Pleistocene	Kromdraai fossil site	South Africa	An ibis, a species of Geronticus.	
Gretcheniao	Gen. et sp. nov	Valid	Chiappe et al.	Early Cretaceous (Barremian)	Yixian Formation	China	A member of Enantiornithes. The type species is G. sinensis.	
Heracles	Gen. et sp. nov	Valid	Worthy et al.	Early Miocene	Bannockburn Formation	New Zealand	A large parrot, possibly a member of Strigopoidea. The type species is H. inexpectatus.	
Hypotaenidia vavauensis	Sp. nov	Valid	Worthy & Burley	Holocene		Tonga	A rail.	
Kookne	Gen. et sp. nov	Valid	Novas et al.	Late Cretaceous (Campanian-Maastrichtian	Chorillo Formation	Argentina	A member of Ornithurae of uncertain phylogenetic placement. The type species is K. yeutensis	
Kupoupou	Gen. et sp. nov	Valid	Blokland et al.	Late early-middle Paleocene	Takatika Grit	New Zealand	An early penguin. The type species is K. stilwelli.	
?Laurillardia smoleni	Sp. nov	Valid	Mayr et al.	Early Oligocene		Poland	A stem-upupiform.	
Megadyptes antipodes richdalei	Subsp. nov	Valid	Cole et al.	Holocene		New Zealand	A subspecies of the yellow-eyed penguin.	
Mengciusornis	Gen. et sp. nov	Valid	Wang et al.	Early Cretaceous	Jiufotang Formation	China	An early member of Ornithuromorpha. Genus includes new species M. dentatus.	
Mirusavis	Gen. et sp. nov	Valid	Wang et al.	Early Cretaceous	Yixian Formation	China	A member of Enantiornithes. The type species is M. parvus. Announced in 2019; the final version of the article naming it was published in 2020.	
Naranbulagornis	Gen. et sp. nov	Valid	Zelenkov	Paleocene		Mongolia	An early, swan-sized member of Anseriformes. Genus includes new species N. khun.	
Orienantius	Gen. et sp. nov	Valid	Liu et al.	Early Cretaceous	Huajiying Formation	China	A member of Enantiornithes. Genus includes new species O. ritteri.	
Proardea? deschutteri	Sp. nov	Valid	Mayr et al.	Early Oligocene	Borgloon Formation	Belgium	A heron.	
Protodontopteryx	Gen. et sp. nov	Valid	Mayr et al.	Early Paleocene		New Zealand	A member of the family Pelagornithidae. Genus includes new species P. ruthae.	
Shangyang	Gen. et sp. nov	Valid	Wang & Zhou	Early Cretaceous	Jiufotang Formation	China	A member of Enantiornithes. Genus includes new species S. graciles.	
Sinoergilornis	Gen. et sp. nov	Valid	Musser, Li & Clarke	Late Miocene	Liushu Formation	China	A member of the family Eogruidae. The type species is S. guangheensis.	
Taphophoyx	Gen. et sp. nov	Valid	Steadman & Takano	Hemphillian		United States (Florida)	A heron. The type species is T. hodgei.	
Xorazmortyx	Gen. et sp. nov	Valid	Zelenkov & Panteleyev	Eocene (Lutetian–Bartonian)		Uzbekistan	A stem-galliform bird belonging to the family Paraortygidae. Genus includes new species X. turkestanensis.	
Zygodactylus ochlurus	Sp. nov		Hieronymus, Waugh & Clarke	Early Oligocene	Renova Formation	United States (Montana)	A member of the family Zygodactylidae.	

=== Avialan research ===
- A study on early bird evolution, aiming to determine their divergence times and evolutionary rates, is published by Zhang & Wang (2019).
- A study on the impact of varying oxygen concentrations, global temperatures and air densities on the flight performance of extinct birds and on major diversification events which took place during the evolution of birds is published by Serrano et al. (2019).
- A study aiming to determine whether there is a relationship between the volume of lacunae of osteocytes derived from static osteogenesis and biological parameters such as genome size, body mass, growth rate, metabolic rate or red blood cell size in extant birds is published by Grunmeier & D'Emic (2019), who evaluate the implications of their finding for inferring physiological paraments in extinct birds, and potentially other vertebrates, on the basis of osteocyte lacunar volumes.
- A study on the expression patterns of the anterior genes Gli_{3} and Alx_{4} in limb buds of emu, chicken and zebra finch embryos, and on their implications for the knowledge of evolution of the avian digital pattern, is published by Kawahata et al. (2019).
- A study on the diversity of regulatory gene expression profiles of amniote digits, evaluating its implications for the knowledge of the origin of the avian digital pattern, is published by Stewart et al. (2019).
- A study on the total mass of the dentition of Mesozoic birds, and on the impact of the reduction and loss of teeth on total body mass of Mesozoic birds, is published by Zhou, Sullivan & Zhang (2019).
- A review of the available evidence of the diet of Mesozoic birds, especially those known from the Lower Cretaceous Jehol Lagerstätte (China), is published by O'Connor (2019).
- A study on the early evolution of the digestive system of birds, as indicated by data from paravians from the Jurassic Yanliao Biota and the Cretaceous Jehol Biota (China), is published online by O'Connor & Zhou (2019).
- A study on the early evolution of the diel activity patterns in diapsid lineages, focusing on the common ancestor branch of living birds, is published by Yu & Wang (2019).
- A study on the diversity of melanosome morphology in iridescent feathers of extant birds, and on its implications for inferring iridescence in fossil feathers in general and in Eocene birds cf. Primotrogon and Scaniacypselus in particular, is published by Nordén et al. (2019).
- A study on the morphology of melanosomes from feathers of extant birds that express non-iridescent structural colour, and on its implications for the possibility of detection of these melanosomes in the fossil record in general and in stem group roller Eocoracias in particular, is published by Babarović et al. (2019).
- Amino acids are detected in two specimens of fossil feathers from the Cretaceous amber from Myanmar and Eocene Baltic amber by McCoy et al. (2019).
- Description of new amber specimens preserving feathers from the Cretaceous of Myanmar, evaluating the implications of these feathers for the knowledge of the development of the rachis-dominated feathers of Mesozoic birds, is published by Carroll, Chiappe & Bottjer (2019).
- A study on Praeornis sharovi from the Late Jurassic of Kazakhstan is published by Agnolin, Rozadilla & Carvalho (2019), who interpret the fossil as a tail feather of a basal bird.
- A geochemical halo of the calamus of the holotype feather of Archaeopteryx lithographica, detected using Laser-Stimulated Fluorescence, is reported by Kaye et al. (2019), who also assess the implications of their findings for the identification of this feather; the study is subsequently criticized by Carney, Tischlinger & Shawkey (2020).
- A study on the postcranial skeleton of the Berlin specimen of Archaeopteryx lithographica, reporting pneumatic structures visible under ultraviolet light and confirming that numerous postcranial bones of Archaeopteryx were reduced in mass via hollow interiors, is published by Schwarz et al. (2019).
- A comparative study of all named taxa referred to Confuciusornithiformes, taxonomic revision of the group and a study on the phylogenetic relationships of members of the group is published by Wang, O'Connor & Zhou (2019).
- Evidence of beak preservation in a referred specimen of Confuciusornis sanctus (originally the holotype of Jinzhouornis zhangjiyingia) is presented by Falk et al. (2019).
- A study on bone histology of Confuciusornis sanctus, and on its implications for the knowledge of the life history of this species, is published online by Chinsamy et al. (2019).
- Fully fledged feathering is reported in a hatchling enantiornithine specimen from the Early Cretaceous Las Hoyas locality in Spain (first described by Knoll et al., 2018) by Kate et al. (2019).
- A remarkably well-preserved foot of an enantiornithine bird, accompanied by part of the wing plumage, is described from the Cretaceous amber from Myanmar by Xing et al. (2019).
- A foot of a bird (likely a member of Enantiornithes; made the holotype of the species Fortipesavis prehendens in a later publication), revealing a morphology previously unrecognized in Mesozoic birds, and a range of feathers representing multiple morphotypes are reported for the Cretaceous amber from Myanmar by Xing et al. (2019).
- O'Connor et al. (2019) describe the integument preserved in four juvenile enantiornithine specimens from the Early Cretaceous Jehol Biota, interpreted by the authors as mid to late immature feathers.
- Description of two new specimens of Protopteryx fengningensis from the Lower Cretaceous Huajiying Formation (China), preserving most of the skeleton and plumage, and providing new information on the anatomy and flight performance of members of this species, is published online by Chiappe et al. (2019).
- A study on the bone microstructure of Yanornis, and on its implications for the knowledge of the growth strategy of this bird, is published online by Wang et al. (2019).
- A study on the evolution and function of avian predentary found in Mesozoic ornithuromorphs, based on data from a specimen of Yanornis martini, is published by Bailleul et al. (2019).
- A study comparing the hindlimb morphology of hesperornithiforms and modern foot-propelled diving birds is published by Bell, Wu & Chiappe (2019).
- A study on the paleobiogeography of hesperornithiforms, evaluating its implications for the knowledge of the paleoecology of the Late Cretaceous Western Interior Seaway, is published by Wilson (2019).
- A large bird femur referred to the species Gargantuavis philoinos, providing new information on the anatomy of this species, is described from the Maastrichtian of southern France by Buffetaut & Angst (2019), who name a new family Gargantuaviidae.
- Description of a well-preserved pelvis of Gargantuavis from the Maastrichtian Sânpetru Formation (Romania), preserving characteristics previously unknown in Gargantuavis and constituting the first record of this genus outside the area of the Late Cretaceous Ibero-Armorican Island, is published online by Mayr et al. (2019), who evaluate the implications of this finding for the knowledge of the phylogenetic relationships of Gargantuavis; the study is subsequently criticized by Buffetaut & Angst (2020).
- A study on the evolution of body size of palaeognath birds is published by Crouch & Clarke (2019).
- A study on the hindlimb anatomy and phylogenetic relationships of Palaeotis weigelti is published by Mayr (2019).
- A study on wing anatomy, body mass, wing surface area, wing span and probable flight parameters of Calciavis grandei is published online by Torres, Norell & Clarke (2019).
- A study on changes of ostrich eggshell bead diameter throughout the Holocene, testing the proposed relationship between changes of ostrich eggshell bead diameter and the spread of herding in Africa, is published by Miller & Sawchuk (2019).
- A study on the taxonomic identification of rhea bones from four archaeological sites in the Mendoza Province (Argentina), based on genetic data, is published by Abbona et al. (2019).
- A study aiming to evaluate whether introduced deer and hares fill the same ecological niches as extinct moa birds in New Zealand, as indicated by data from pollen extracted from moa coprolites and mammal feces, is published by Wood & Wilmshurst (2019).
- A study on the anatomy of the cancellous bone in the femur, tibiotarsus and fibula of three moa species is published by Bishop, Scofield & Hocknull (2019).
- A study on population densities and on the relationship between body mass and population densities in moa birds is published online by Latham et al. (2019).
- A femur of a very large specimen of "Struthio" dmanisensis is described from the Early Pleistocene of the Crimean Peninsula by Zelenkov et al. (2019), who transfer this species to the genus Pachystruthio and estimate body mass of this species.
- A study on the microstructure of the bones of Vegavis iaai is published by Garcia Marsà, Agnolín & Novas (2019).
- Eggshells and a small ovoid-shaped egg of neognathous birds, probably members of the family Presbyornithidae, as well as a carpometacarpus of a presbyornithid are described from the Eocene of the Glib Zegdou Formation (Algeria) by Garcia et al. (2019).
- A study on the putative cariamiform femur from the Maastrichtian Sandwich Bluff Member of the López de Bertodano Formation (Vega Island, Antarctica) reported by Case et al. (2006) is published by West et al. (2019), who reinterpret this specimen as a fossil of an unnamed large-bodied member of the genus Vegavis.
- A study on the holotype specimen and other fossils attributed to the species Cayaoa bruneti is published by De Mendoza & Tambussi (2019), who present a revised diagnosis of this species.
- A study on the phylogenetic relationships of Cayaoa bruneti is published by De Mendoza (2019).
- A study on the Cenozoic fossil record of anatids from Eurasia is published by Zelenkov (2019).
- A study on the morphology of the postcranial skeleton of the Oligocene-Miocene galliform Palaeortyx, and on the phylogenetic relationships of this taxon, is published by Zelenkov (2019).
- A study on the phylogenetic relationships of extant and fossil members of Strisores is published by Chen et al. (2019).
- Description of new fossil material of Pellornis mikkelseni, providing new information on the anatomy of this species, and a study on the phylogenetic relationships of this species is published by Musser, Ksepka & Field (2019).
- A study on the phylogenetic relationships of the adzebills, as indicated by data from near-complete mitochondrial genome sequences, is published by Boast et al. (2019).
- A study on the phylogenetic relationships of the adzebills, as indicated by morphological and molecular data, is published by Musser & Cracraft (2019).
- A study on two humeri of rails belonging to the genus Dryolimnas from the Pleistocene of the Picard Island (Seychelles) is published by Hume & Martill (2019), who interpret these humeri as bones of a flightless rail, and consider them to be evidence of repeated evolution flightlessness in members of the genus Dryolimnas inhabiting the Aldabra Atoll – before the atoll was completely submerged in the late Pleistocene, as well as after it emerged from the ocean again.
- A study on the phylogenetic relationships and evolutionary history of living and extinct flightless lineages of the white-throated rail from the Aldabra Group is published by van de Crommenacker et al. (2019).
- A revision of extinct endemic rails of the Mascarene Islands and a study on their ecology and extinction chronologies is published by Hume (2019).
- A study on the taxonomic status of the Canary Islands oystercatcher (Haematopus meadewaldoi) is published online by Senfeld et al. (2019).
- A study on the fossil material attributed to the species Becassius charadriioides is published online by De Pietri, Mayr & Scofield (2019), who assign this species to the family Glareolidae.
- A nearly complete tarsometatarsus of the least seedsnipe (Thinocorus rumicivorus) is described from the Ensenadan of Argentina by Picasso, De Mendoza & Gelfo (2019).
- A study aiming to determine the drivers of the extinction of the great auk, based on data from mitochondrial genome sequences from across its geographic range, is published by Thomas et al. (2019).
- Pedal phalanx of a penguin affected by osteomyelitis is described from the Eocene of West Antarctica by Jadwiszczak & Rothschild (2019).
- A set of skeletal elements of a penguin attributable to the species Delphinornis larseni, providing new information on the anatomy of this species, is described from the Eocene Submeseta Formation (Seymour Island, Antarctica) by Jadwiszczak & Mörs (2019).
- The first skull reliably assigned to Anthropornis grandis is described from the Eocene (Bartonian) Submeseta Formation (Seymour Island, Antarctica) by Acosta Hospitaleche et al. (2019).
- A study on the holotype specimen of Tereingaornis moisleyi, evaluating the taxonomic validity of this species, is published online by Thomas et al. (2019).
- A fossil humerus of the Magellanic penguin or a relative of this species is described from Uruguay by Acosta Hospitaleche et al. (2019), representing the first fossil of a penguin from Uruguay reported so far.
- A study on changes in the population size of the Adélie penguin colonies and relative krill abundance in the Prydz Bay (Antarctica) during the 2nd millennium, as indicated by data from ornithogenic sediment cores from the Vestfold Hills, will be published by Gao et al. (2019).
- A vertebra of a stork similar to the maguari stork is described from the late Pleistocene of the Santa Vitória Formation (Rio Grande do Sul, Brazil) by Lopes, Pereira & Ferigolo (2019), who evaluate the implications of this finding for reconstructions of local paleoenvironment.
- Restudy of a putative bill of an ibis-like bird from the Eocene La Meseta Formation (Antarctica) described by Jadwiszczak, Gaździcki & Tatur (2008) is published by Agnolin, Bogan & Rozadilla (2019), who consider this specimen to be more likely to be a dorsal spine of a chimaeroid cartilaginous fish.
- A study on the body mass evolution in the clade Telluraves, incorporating data from 76 extinct species, is published by Crouch & Mason-Gamer (2019).
- A study on the demographic history of the Andean condors in southern South America and on the causes of their survival of late Quaternary megafauna extinctions is published by Perrig et al. (2019).
- Hindlimb bones of an extinct eagle of uncertain phylogenetic placement are described from the late Quaternary of Hispaniola by Steadman, Milan & Mychajliw (2019).
- A study on the origin and evolution of the Haast's eagle and the Eyles's harrier, as indicated by complete mitochondrial genome data, is published by Knapp et al. (2019).
- Evidence from Neanderthal-associated sites in Europe indicating that Neanderthals practiced catching the golden eagles is presented by Finlayson et al. (2019).
- Evidence of Châtelperronian Neanderthals using pedal phalanges of imperial eagles for symbolic practices is reported from the Cova Foradà site (Spain) by Rodríguez-Hidalgo et al. (2019).
- A study on the impact of the climate changes of the last 35,000 years on the long-eared owls and burrowing owls, as indicated by data from fossils from the La Brea Tar Pits, is published by Madan, Prothero & Syverson (2019).
- A study on the geographical origin and evolutionary history of Coraciiformes, based on data from extant taxa and from fossils, is published by McCullough et al. (2019).
- New skull remains of Phorusrhacos longissimus are described from the Cerro de los fósiles site in the Miocene Santa Cruz Formation (Argentina) by Degrange et al. (2019).
- A study on the phylogenetic relationships of the Bahaman caracara, based on data from a nearly complete mitochondrial genome recovered from a bone of a member of this species, is published by Oswald et al. (2019).
- A study on the holotype specimen of Calcardea junnei is published by Mayr, Gingerich & Smith (2019), who reject the interpretation of this species as a heron, and claim that this bird resembled parrot-like taxon Vastanavis from the early Eocene of India.
- A study on the identity of a parakeet specimen held at National Museums Scotland, interpreted as most likely originating from Mauritius by Cheke & Jansen (2016), is published by Jones et al. (2019), who consider this parakeet to be the only known skin specimen of extinct Réunion parakeet.
- Complete genomic sequence of a specimen of the Carolina parakeet is generated by Gelabert et al. (2019), who evaluate the implications of their findings for the knowledge of the phylogenetic relationships of this species, its demographic history and adaptation to a toxic diet.
- A study on the phylogenetic relationships, biogeography and diversification rates of passerine birds throughout their evolutionary history, aiming to evaluate the impact of major events in Earth history on the evolution of passerines, is published by Oliveros et al. (2019).
- Dussex et al. (2019) sequence whole genomes of the huia and the South Island kokako, and evaluate whether the loss of genomic diversity played a role in their extinction.
- A review of Cretaceous and Paleogene bird fossils from the James Ross Basin (Antarctica) is published by Acosta Hospitaleche et al. (2019).
- A study on drivers of bird distribution shifts throughout the Cenozoic is published by Saupe et al. (2019).
- A review of the bird fossil assemblage from the Paleocene locality of Menat (Puy-de-Dôme, France), including a new fossil specimen with exceptional soft tissue preservation, is published by Mayr, Hervet & Buffetaut (2019).
- New bird fossils, including the oldest European record of the Gastornithidae which is temporally well-constrained, are described from the Paleocene localities from the North Sea Basin in Belgium (Maret) and France (Templeuve and Rivecourt-Petit Pâtis) by Mayr & Smith (2019).
- A revision of bird fossils from the Eocene (Ypresian) fossil sites of the North American Okanagan Highlands, mainly in British Columbia (Canada), is published by Mayr et al. (2019), who report, among other findings, a skeleton of a possible member of the family Songziidae, and fossil wings which might constitute the earliest known record of Gaviiformes.
- An assemblage of 54 bird bones from early Eocene marine sediments of the Ampe quarry near Egem in Belgium is described by Mayr & Smith (2019).
- New Eocene bird fossils, including remains of members of Pan-Charadriiformes, a member of Pan-Mirandornithes and a member or a relative of the family Quercymegapodiidae, are described from the Bumban Member of the Naranbulag Formation (Mongolia) by Hood et al. (2019).
- Flamingo-like and anatid-like fossil bird footprints are described from the Vinchina Formation (Argentina) by Farina et al. (2019), who name new ichnotaxa Phoenicopterichnum lucioi and P. vinchinaensis.
- A study on the date of extinction of the Tristan moorhen, the Inaccessible Island finch and the Tristan albatross on the main island of the Tristan da Cunha archipelago, aiming to place these extinctions in the context of the changing island ecosystems of the nineteenth and early twentieth centuries, is published by Bond, Carlson & Burgio (2019).
- Description of a fossil bird assemblage from the early Pliocene of the Na Burguesa-1 site (Mallorca, Spain) is published by Torres-Roig et al. (2019).
- A study on the impact of Plio-Pleistocene environmental changes on the bird fauna of New Zealand is published by Rawlence et al. (2019).
- Description of Late Pleistocene and Holocene bird remains from Jerimalai and Matja Kuru 1 sites in East Timor will be published by Meijer, Louys & O'Connor (2019).
- Description of bird remains from the Grotta di Castelcivita site (Italy) and a study on their implications for the knowledge of local environment and human-bird interactions in the Paleolithic is published by Fiore et al. (2019).
- Description of bird remains from the Qesem cave (Israel) dated to between 420 and 200 ka, and a study on their implications for the knowledge of interactions of birds and humans occupying the site, is published by Blasco et al. (2019).
- A study on the phylogenetic relationships of the dodo and the great auk, as indicated by data from proteins extracted from bone material, is published by Horn et al. (2019).
- A study on bone surface modifications of Pleistocene bird fossils from Mata Menge site (Flores, Indonesia) is published by Meijer et al. (2019), who report no unambiguous evidence for exploitation of birds from Mata Menge by early hominins.
- A study on the impact of human colonization of New Zealand on the diversity dynamics of New Zealand bird fauna is published by Valente, Etienne & Garcia-R (2019).

== Pterosaurs ==
=== New pterosaur taxa ===
Name	Novelty	Status	Authors	Age	Type locality	Country	Notes	Images
Albadraco	Gen. et sp. nov	Valid	Solomon et al.	Late Cretaceous (Maastrichtian)		Romania	An azhdarchid pterosaur. Genus includes new species A. tharmisensis. Announced in 2019; the final version of the article naming it was published in 2020.	
Coloborhynchus fluviferox	Sp. nov	Valid	Jacobs et al.	Cretaceous	Kem Kem Beds	Morocco	Announced in 2018; the final version of the article naming it was published in 2019. Originally described as a species of Coloborhynchus, but subsequently transferred to the genus Nicorhynchus.	
Cryodrakon	Gen. et sp. nov	Valid	Hone et al.	Late Cretaceous	Dinosaur Park Formation	Canada	A large azhdarchid pterosaur comparable in size to the giant Quetzalcoatlus. The type species is C. boreas.	
Ferrodraco	Gen. et sp. nov	Valid	Pentland et al.	Late Cretaceous (Cenomanian–Turonian)	Winton Formation	Australia	A member of the family Ornithocheiridae. The type species is F. lentoni.	
Iberodactylus	Gen. et sp. nov	Valid	Holgado et al.	Early Cretaceous (Barremian)	Blesa Formation	Spain	A member of Anhangueria assigned to the new family Hamipteridae. The type species is I. andreui.	
Keresdrakon	Gen. et sp. nov	Valid	Kellner et al.	Cretaceous	Goio-Erê Formation	Brazil	A basal member of Tapejaromorpha. The type species is K. vilsoni.	
Mimodactylus	Gen. et sp. nov	Valid	Kellner et al.	Late Cretaceous (Cenomanian)	Sannine Formation	Lebanon	A member of Pterodactyloidea related to Haopterus. The type species is M. libanensis.	
Nurhachius luei	Sp. nov	Valid	Zhou et al.	Early Cretaceous (Aptian)	Jiufotang Formation	China	A member of the family Istiodactylidae.	N. luei (E)
Seazzadactylus	Gen. et sp. nov	Valid	Dalla Vecchia	Late Triassic (Norian)	Dolomia di Forni Formation	Italy	An early non-monofenestratan pterosaur. The type species is S. venieri.	
Targaryendraco	Gen. et comb. nov	Valid	Pêgas et al.	Early Cretaceous (Hauterivian)		Germany	A new genus for "Ornithocheirus" wiedenrothi Wild 1990.	

=== Pterosaur research ===
- A study on the evolution of vertebral pneumaticity in pterosaurs is published by Buchmann & Rodrigues (2019).
- A study on the development of pterosaur embryos is published by Unwin & Deeming (2019).
- A study on three pterosaur coprolites from the Upper Jurassic of Poland, probably produced by ctenochasmatids, and on the probable diet of their producers is published by Qvarnström et al. (2019).
- Pycnofibers showing diagnostic features of feathers are reported in two specimens of anurognathid pterosaurs (probably belonging either to the genus Jeholopterus or Dendrorhynchoides) from the Jurassic of China by Yang et al. (2019); the study is subsequently criticized by Unwin & Martill (2020).
- Redescription of the holotype specimen of Mythunga camara is published by Pentland & Poropat (2019).
- Partial left metacarpal of a large ornithocheirid pterosaur is described from the Lower Cretaceous (Barremian) Wessex Formation (United Kingdom) by Martill & Coram (2019).
- New specimen of Sinopterus atavismus (a nearly complete skeleton) is described from the Lower Cretaceous (Aptian) Jiufotang Formation (China) by Zhang et al. (2019).
- A study on intervertebral foramina in Vectidraco, Anhanguera and Coloborhynchus, and on their implications for inferring palaeoecology and locomotion of these pterosaurs, is published by Martin-Silverstone, Sykes & Naish (2019).
- The first pterosaur postcranial bone (a left ulna) from the Albian Lohan Cura Formation (Argentina) is described by Bellardini & Codorniú (2019).
- A study on the melanin content of the soft tissue headcrest of a specimen of Tupandactylus imperator is published by Pinheiro et al. (2019).
- Kellner et al. (2019) describe fossils of pterodactyloid pterosaurs from the Upper Cretaceous Santa Marta Formation and Snow Hill Island Formation (Antarctica).

== Other archosaurs ==
=== Other new archosaur taxa ===
Name	Novelty	Status	Authors	Age	Type locality	Country	Notes	Images
Aenigmaspina	Gen. et sp. nov	Valid	Patrick, Whiteside & Benton	Late Triassic		United Kingdom	An archosaur of uncertain phylogenetic placement. Genus includes new species A. pantyffynnonensis.	
Kwanasaurus	Gen. et sp. nov	Valid	Martz & Small	Late Triassic (Norian and/or Rhaetian)	Chinle Formation	United States (Colorado)	A member of the family Silesauridae. The type species is K. williamparkeri.	

=== Other archosaur research ===
- Fossils of an immature lagerpetid, representing a new morphotype different from other known lagerpetids, and co-occurring with dinosaurs and silesaurids, are described from the Candelária Sequence of the Upper Triassic Santa Maria Formation (Brazil) by Garcia et al. (2019).
- A study on the histology and gross morphology of a growth series of femora of Dromomeron romeri is published by Griffin et al. (2019).
- A study reevaluating the taxonomic validity of Lagosuchus talampayensis is published by Agnolin & Ezcurra (2019).
- A study on the microstructure of the long bones (femur and tibiae) of Lewisuchus admixtus is published by Garcia Marsà, Agnolín & Novas (2019).
- New specimen of Lewisuchus admixtus is described from the Chañares Formation (Argentina) by Ezcurra et al. (2019).
- A study on the anatomy of the skeleton of Asilisaurus kongwe is published online by Nesbitt, Langer & Ezcurra (2019).
- A study on the anatomy of the braincase of Silesaurus opolensis is published by Piechowski, Niedźwiedzki & Tałanda (2019).
- Coprolites containing beetle remains, most likely produced by Silesaurus opolensis, are described from the Upper Triassic Krasiejów locality (Poland) by Qvarnström et al. (2019).
- A study on bone histology of Sacisaurus agudoensis is published by Veiga et al. (2019).
- A study on the phylogenetic relationships of Pisanosaurus mertii is published by Baron (2019), who interprets this taxon as a likely silesaurid.

== General research ==
- A study on patterns of evolutionary integration among regions of the archosaur skull, based on data from extant and fossil taxa, is published by Felice et al. (2019).
- A review of the biogeographic history of crocodyliforms, sauropod dinosaurs, nonavian theropod dinosaurs and mammals from the Mesozoic of Gondwana is published by Krause et al. (2019).
- A study on the biogeography of Cretaceous terrestrial tetrapods, including terrestrial crocodyliforms, non-avian dinosaurs, birds and pterosaurs, is published by Kubo (2019).
- A study on size and shape differences between brains and endocasts of extant American alligator and domestic chicken, and on its implications for inferring whether endocasts are a reliable proxy for brain morphology in archosaurs in general, is published by Watanabe et al. (2019).
- A study comparing the mechanical properties of teeth of Suchomimus tenerensis and Sarcosuchus imperator is published by Kundanati et al. (2019).
- A study on the distribution of medullary bone in the skeletons of living birds, aiming to refine the set of criteria used to evaluate purported records of medullary bone tissue in fossil avemetatarsalians, is published by Canoville, Schweitzer & Zanno (2019).
- A study comparing the anatomy of hindlimbs of cursorial birds, non-avian theropod dinosaurs and other cursorial animals, aiming to determine whether cursorial birds are good kinematic model for reconstructions of theropod dinosaur locomotion, is published by Grossi et al. (2019).
- A study on the microstructure of eggshells in birds and non-avian maniraptoran dinosaurs is published by Choi, Han & Lee (2019).
- Hu et al. (2019) reconstruct the vomer of Sapeornis and Sinovenator, and evaluate their implications for the knowledge of the evolution of the skull of paravians.
- A study on the anatomy of skull fenestrae in sauropsids, and on its implications for reconstructions of dinosaur soft tissues, is published online by Holliday et al. (2019).
- A study aiming to determine the likely karyotype of the dinosaur and the early diapsid ancestor of birds is published by Griffin, Larkin & O'Connor (2019).
- A study on the evolution of bipedality in archosaurs is published by Grinham, VanBuren & Norman (2019).
- A study on the evolution of the brain of bird-line archosaurs is published by Beyrand et al. (2019).
- A review of the progress in the field of archosaur paleohistology, focusing in particular on the study of the dinosaurs, is published by Bailleul, O'Connor & Schweitzer (2019).
- A study on the phylogenetic distribution of the hyposphene-hypantrum articulation in the vertebrae of archosaurs is published by Stefanic & Nesbitt (2019).
- A study comparing growth patterns of the American alligator, chicken and Tenontosaurus tilletti is published by Brunner et al. (2019).
- A study comparing the position, size and number of pneumatic foramina in the vertebrae of pterosaurs and birds is published by Buchmann, Avilla & Rodrigues (2019).
- A study on non-avian dinosaur and bird tracks (representing some of the oldest known bird tracks) preserved in slabs used as building stones at the Chengde Mountain Resort, originating from the Tuchengzi Formation (China) and dating to the Jurassic-Cretaceous boundary, is published online by Xing et al. (2019).
- Description of non-avian dinosaur and bird tracks from the Upper Cretaceous Chignik Formation (southwestern Alaska), evaluating their implications for the knowledge of habitat preferences of northern high-latitude dinosaurs, is published by Fiorillo et al. (2019).
- An assemblage of non-avian dinosaur and bird feathers is described from the Lower Cretaceous Koonwarra Fossil Bed (Australia) by Kundrát et al. (2019).
- A study on barb angles in birds and non-avian dinosaurs, evaluating their implications for the knowledge of feather shape evolution and the utility of barb angles for determination of flight abilities of fossil taxa, is published by Wang, Tang & Clarke (2019).
