= Tangahoe Formation =

Geologic formation in the southwestern North Island of New Zealand

- Stratigraphic range: Middle Pliocene ~3.4–3.0 Ma
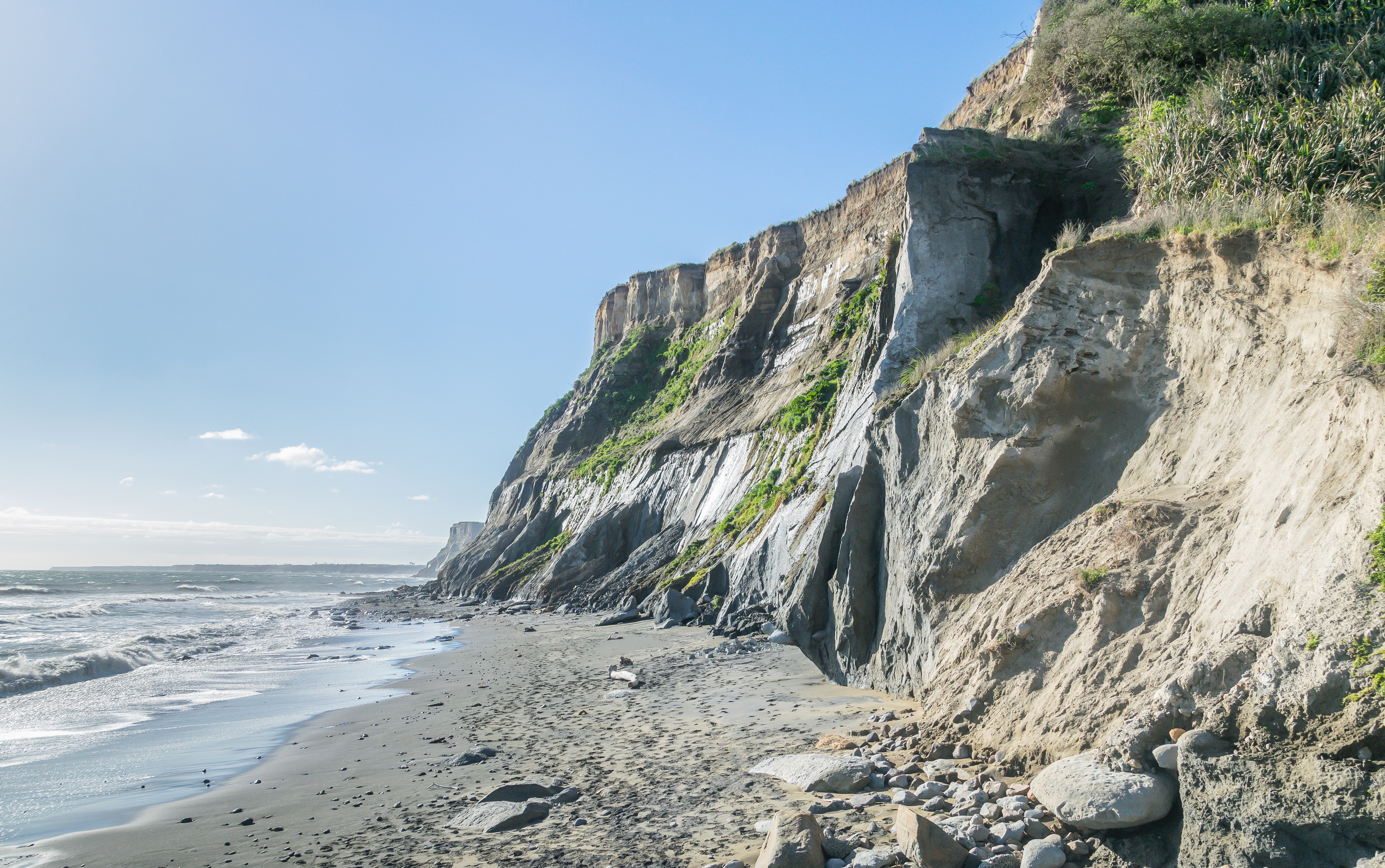
- Exposed rock at Waihi Beach Reserve, South Taranaki, New Zealand

Lithology
- Primary: Mudstone

Location
- Coordinates: 39°30′S 174°50′E
- Region: Taranaki
- Country: New Zealand
- Extent: Wanganui Basin, North Island
- Tangahoe Formation (New Zealand)

The Tangahoe Formation is a geologic formation in the southwestern North Island of New Zealand.

The formation occurs in the Taranaki and Manawatū-Whanganui Regions, spreading in an east–west band for 200 kilometres (120 mi) from the volcanic deposits of Mount Taranaki in the west to the Ruahine Ranges in the east, in a band with an average width of around 20 kilometres (12 mi). It becomes exposed at its western end close to the Tasman Sea coast near Hāwera in a series of cliff faces. The formation takes its name from the Tangahoe River, which is located close to the exposed cliffs.

The formation is sedimentary, composed largely of muddy sandstones, and was formed beneath sea level in the Waipipian stage of the mid-Pliocene some 3.4 to 3.0 million years ago.

== Fossil content ==
Color key: Taxon / Reclassified taxon / Taxon falsely reported as present / Dubious taxon or junior synonym / Ichnotaxon / Ootaxon / Morphotaxon	Notes; Uncertain or tentative taxa are in small text; ~~crossed out~~ taxa are discredited.

The formation is an important fossil site. Many marine fossils have been recovered from its mudstones, including the megalodon shark, giant petrel Macronectes tinae, penguin Eudyptes atatu, monk seal Eomonachus belegaerensis, and cetaceans.

=== Mammals ===
Mammals reported from the Tangahoe Formation
Genus	Species	Presence	Material	Notes	Images
Delphinidae indet.	Indeterminate	Waihi Beach	Mandible.	A dolphin, probably from a species of Delphinus or Stenella.	
Eomonachus	E. belegaerensis	Northwest of Waihi Stream on Ohawe and Waihi Beaches.	Skull elements.	A monk seal.	

=== Birds ===
Birds reported from the Tangahoe Formation
Genus	Species	Presence	Material	Notes	Images
Aldiomedes	A. angustirostris	Ohawe Beach.	Skull.	An albatross.	
Ardenna	A. buchananbrowni	Ohawe & Waihi beaches.	2 partial skeletons.	A shearwater.	
Ardenna	A. davealleni	Ohawe Beach.	Partial skeleton.	A shearwater.	
Eudyptes	E. atatu	No exact locality record.	Multiple partial skeletons.	A penguin.	
Eudyptula	E. wilsonae	No exact locality record.	Skulls.	A penguin.	
Macronectes	M. tinae	Hawera.	Skull & humerus.	A petrel.	
Pelagornithidae	Undescribed	Waihi Beach.	Partial humerus & radius.	An unnamed species of pseudotooth bird.	
Procellaria	P. altirostris	Ohawe Beach.	Partial skeleton.	A petrel.	
Tereingaornis	T. moisleyi	Waihi Beach.	Left humerus & coracoid.	A penguin, now deemed a nomen dubium.	

=== Fish ===
Fish reported from the Tangahoe Formation
Genus	Species	Presence	Material	Notes	Images
Carcharodon	C. megalodon	Hawera.	Vertebrae.	Species now moved to Otodus.	
Ikamauius	I. ensifer	Waihi Beach.	Rostral denticle.	A sawshark.	
Otodus	O. megalodon	Hawera.	Vertebrae.	A megatooth shark, originally reported as Carcharodon megalodon.	
Pristiophorus	P. lanceolatus	Northwest of the Tangahoe River mouth.	Rostral denticle.	Species now deemed a nomen dubium, specimen reassigned as P. sp.	
Pristiophorus	P. sp.	Northwest of the Tangahoe River mouth.	Rostral denticle.	A sawshark, originally reported as P. lanceolatus.	
cf. Tetrosomus	cf. T. sp.	Waihi Beach	A near-complete articulated specimen.	A boxfish.	

=== Invertebrates ===
Invertebrates reported from the Tangahoe Formation
Genus	Species	Presence	Material	Notes	Images
Palaega	P. kakatahi	Between Raukawa Falls & Kakatahi.	A single specimen.	A cirolanid isopod.	
