= Matt Lamanna =

American paleontologist

Matthew Carl Lamanna is a paleontologist and the assistant curator of vertebrate paleontology at the Carnegie Museum of Natural History, where he oversees the dinosaur collection.

== Education ==
Lamanna graduated from Hobart College in Geneva, New York in 1997. He received high honors in biology and geology. Lamanna went on to get his M.A. and Ph.D. in earth and environmental science from the University of Pennsylvania.
