= Xorazmortyx =

Xorazmortyx Temporal range: Middle Eocene

Scientific classification
- Kingdom: Animalia
- Phylum: Chordata
- Class: Aves
- Order: Galliformes
- Genus: †Xorazmortyx
- Species: †X. turkestanensis

Binomial name
- †Xorazmortyx turkestanensis Zelenkov & Panteleyev, 2019

Extinct genus of birds

Xorazmortyx is an extinct genus of galliform that lived during the Eocene epoch.

== Distribution ==
Xorazmortyx turkestanensis is known from the Middle Eocene of Uzbekistan.
