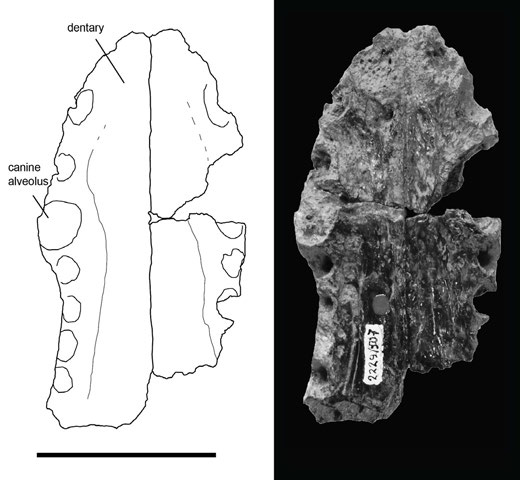
- Holotype

Scientific classification
- Domain: Eukaryota
- Kingdom: Animalia
- Phylum: Chordata
- Class: Reptilia
- Clade: Archosauria
- Clade: Pseudosuchia
- Clade: Crocodylomorpha
- Clade: Crocodyliformes
- Family: †Paralligatoridae
- Genus: †Turanosuchus; Efimov, 1988

Type species
- †Turanosuchus aralensis Efimov, 1988

= Turanosuchus =

Turanosuchus Temporal range: Late Cretaceous

Extinct genus of reptiles

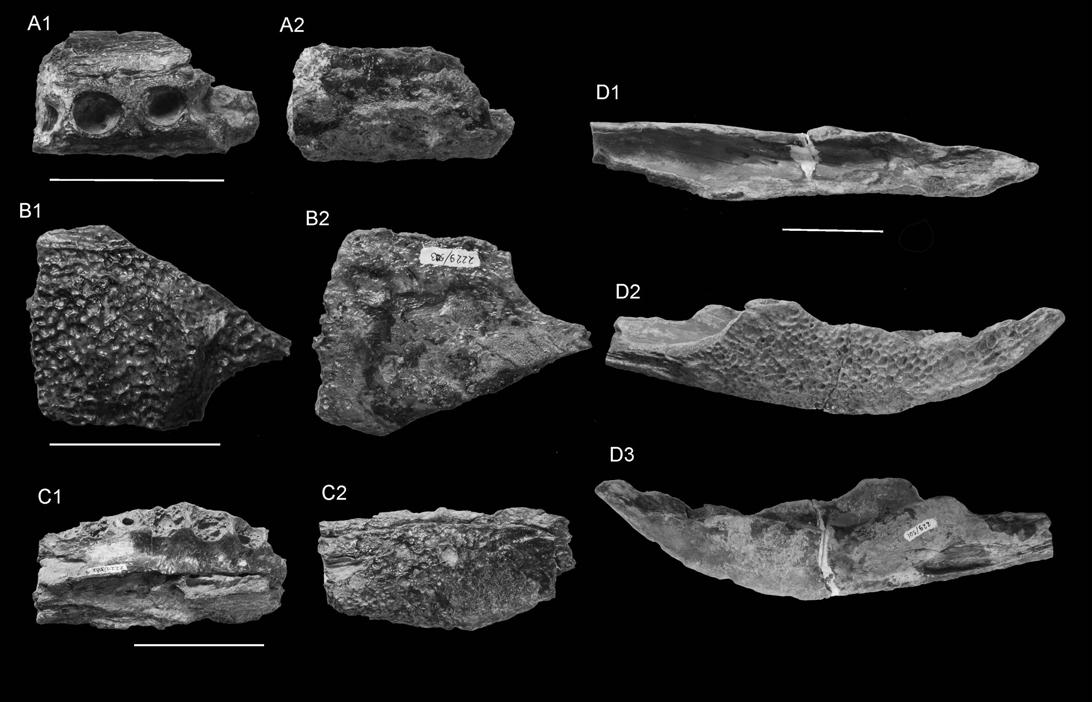
Referred material

Turanosuchus is an extinct genus of paralligatorid crocodyliform. It is based on PIN 2229/507, a partial lower jaw consisting of the area where the two halves of the lower jaw meet (mandibular symphysis). This specimen was found in rocks of the lower Santonian-age Upper Cretaceous Bostobe Svita of Shakh-Shakh, southern Kazakhstan. Turanosuchus was described in 1988 by Mikhail Efimov. The type species is T. aralensis. Halliday et al. (2015) revised the material attributed to T. aralensis and concluded that it represents non-diagnostic neosuchian material, and as such the genus was considered to be a nomen dubium.

Skutschas, Rezvyi & Efimov (2015) considered Turanosuchus aralensis to be a junior synonym of Kansajsuchus extensus. Kuzmin et al. (2019) considered genus Turanosuchus to be a junior synonym of the genus Kansajsuchus; however, the authors were uncertain whether T. aralensis is a junior synonym of K. extensus or a distinct paralligatorid taxon (though closely related to K. extensus). The authors noted that the fossil material attributed to T. aralensis demonstrates a single autapomorphy of K. extensus among paralligatorids (restriction of the frontal participation in the orbital margin), but this feature varies among specimens of T. aralensis. According to the authors, this variability could either reflect ontogenetic/individual variation in this feature or indicate the presence of a taxon distinct from K. extensus.
