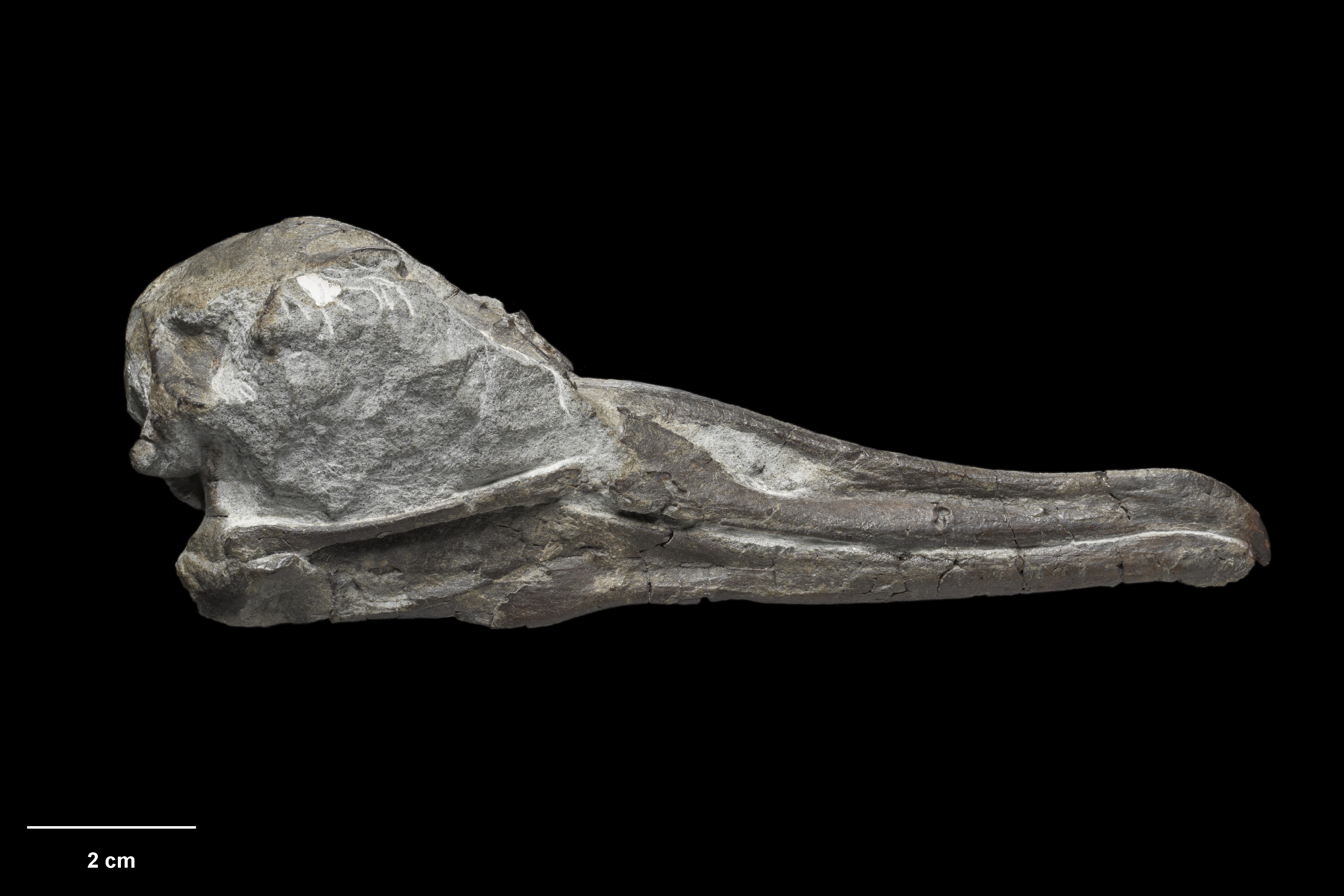
- Fossil skull of A. angustirostris from the collection of the Museum of New Zealand

Scientific classification
- Kingdom: Animalia
- Phylum: Chordata
- Class: Aves
- Order: Procellariiformes
- Family: Diomedeidae
- Genus: †Aldiomedes
- Species: †A. angustirostris

Binomial name
- †Aldiomedes angustirostris Mayr & Tennyson, 2020

= Aldiomedes =

Aldiomedes Temporal range: Piacenzian

Extinct genus of birds

Aldiomedes is an extinct genus of albatross that lived in New Zealand during the Piacenzian stage. It is a monotypic genus containing the species A. angustirostris.
