= Tereingaornis =

Tereingaornis Temporal range: Middle Pliocene 3.6–3.0 Ma

Scientific classification
- Kingdom: Animalia
- Phylum: Chordata
- Class: Aves
- Order: Sphenisciformes
- Family: Spheniscidae
- Genus: †Tereingaornis; Scarlett, 1983
- Species: †T. moisleyi

Binomial name
- †Tereingaornis moisleyi Scarlett, 1983

Extinct genus of birds

Tereingaornis moisleyi, also referred to as Moisley's penguin, is a genus and species of extinct penguin from the Middle Pliocene of New Zealand. It was slightly smaller than the extant Fiordland crested penguin. It was described by Ron Scarlett in 1983 from fossil material (a coracoid, humerus and other bones) found by William Moisley near Te Reinga Falls on the Wairoa River, in the Hawke's Bay Region of the North Island, the first fossil penguin recorded from the North Island. Moisley found the specimen in 1973 and donated it to the Canterbury Museum in 1981. Another specimen was found later at Waihi Beach, Hāwera, on the South Taranaki Bight. The genus name Tereingaornis combines the name of the type locality with the Greek ornis ("bird"); the specific epithet honours the discoverer of the fossil.
