= List of the Mesozoic life of Utah =

This list of the Mesozoic life of Utah contains the various prehistoric life-forms whose fossilized remains have been reported from within the US state of Utah and are between 252.17 and 66 million years of age.

== A ==
- †Abrekopsis
  - †Abrekopsis depresispirus – type locality for species
- †Abydosaurus – type locality for genus
  - †Abydosaurus mcintoshi – type locality for species
- †Aclistochara
  - †Aclistochara bransoni
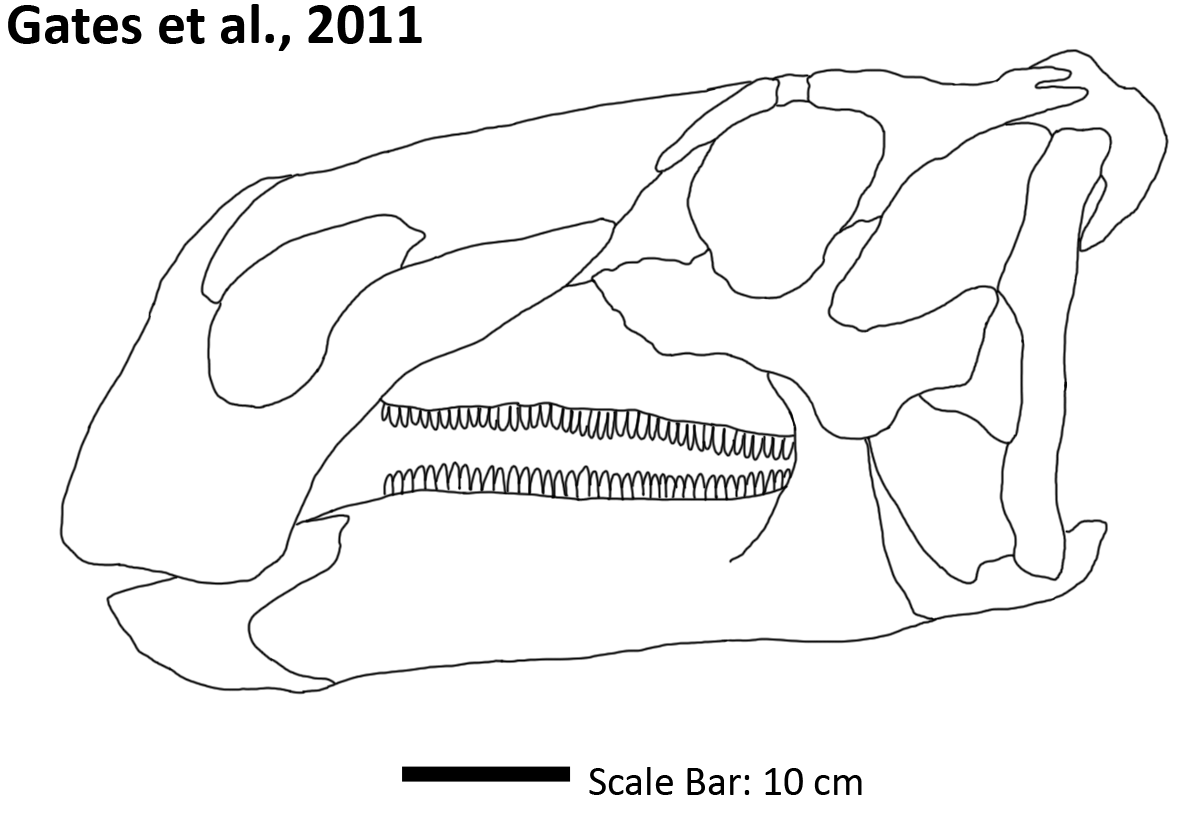
- Fossilized skull of the Late Cretaceous duck-billed dinosaur Acristavus
  †Acristavus
  - †Acristavus gagslarsoni
- †Adelodelphys
  - †Adelodelphys muizoni
- †Adelolophus – type locality for genus
  - †Adelolophus hutchisoni – type locality for species
- †Admetopsis
- †Adocus
- †Aenigmadelphys
  - †Aenigmadelphys archeri – type locality for species
- Diagram illustrating the sizes of three specimens of the Late Cretaceous long-necked dinosaur Alamosaurus, with an anachronistic human to scale
  †Alamosaurus
  - †Alamosaurus sanjuanensis
- †Albanerpeton
  - †Albanerpeton cifellii – type locality for species
  - †Albanerpeton galaktion
  - †Albanerpeton gracilis
  - †Albanerpeton nexuosus
- †Allocrioceras
  - †Allocrioceras annulatum
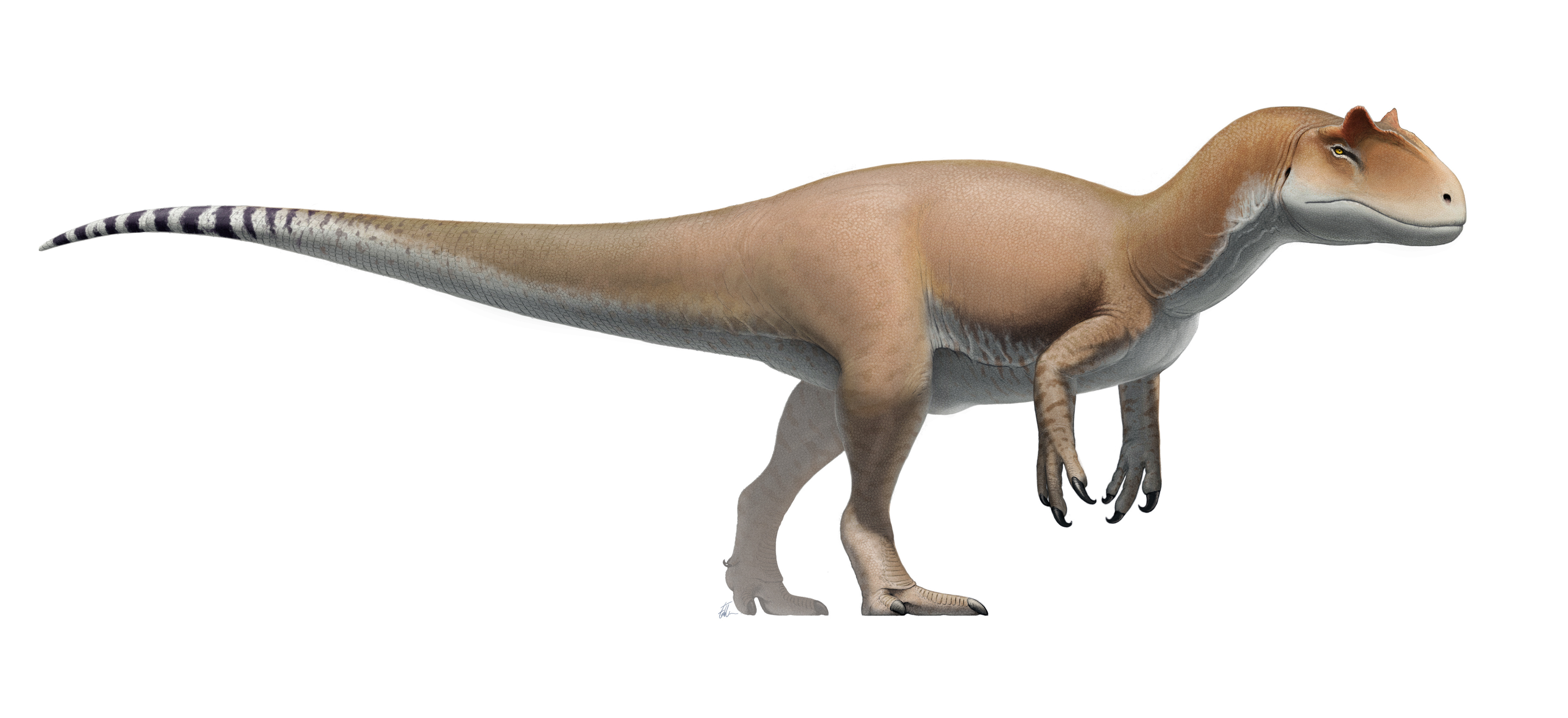
- Life restoration of the Late Jurassic theropod dinosaur Allosaurus
  †Allosaurus
  - †Allosaurus fragilis
  - †Allosaurus jimmadseni – type locality for species
- †Alphadon
  - †Alphadon attaragos
  - †Alphadon eatoni – type locality for species
  - †Alphadon halleyi
  - †Alphadon marshi – or unidentified comparable form
  - †Alphadon sahnii
- †Alzadites
  - †Alzadites incomptus
- †Amberleya – tentative report
- †Amblotherium
  - †Amblotherium gracilis
- †Ameribaatar – type locality for genus
  - †Ameribaatar zofiae – type locality for species
- †Ameribataar
  - †Ameribataar zofiae
- Amia
- †Ampezzopleura
  - †Ampezzopleura rugosa – type locality for species
- †Amplovalvata
- †Anaflemingites
  - †Anaflemingites silberlingi – or unidentified related form
- †Anasibirites
  - †Anasibirites angulosus
  - †Anasibirites bastini
  - †Anasibirites hircinus
  - †Anasibirites kingianus
  - †Anasibirites mojsisovicsi
  - †Anasibirites multiformis
  - †Anasibirites tenuistriatus
- †Anawasatchites
- †Anchisauripus
  - †Anchisauripus sillimani
- †Anchistodelphys – type locality for genus
  - †Anchistodelphys archibaldi – type locality for species
  - †Anchistodelphys delicatus – type locality for species
- †Anchura
- †Anemia
  - †Anemia dakotensis
  - †Anemia dicksoniana
  - †Anemia fremontii
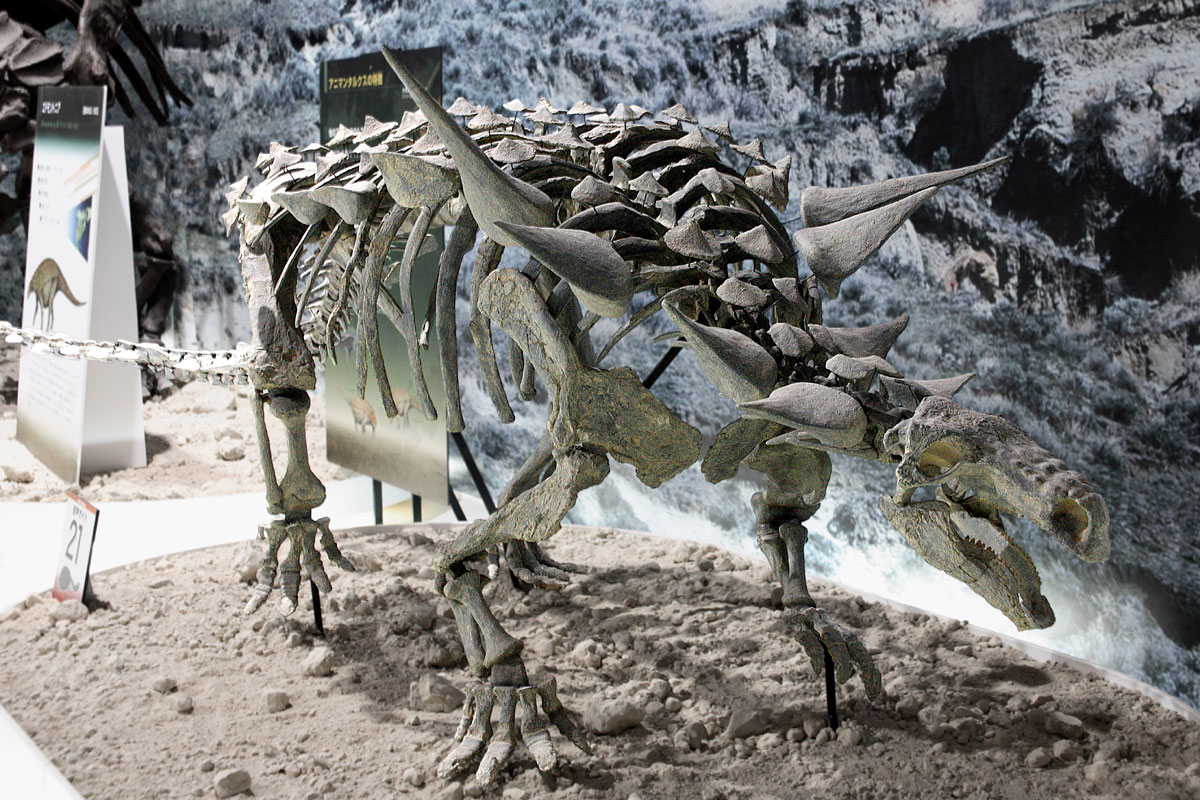
- Mounted fossilized skeleton of the Cretaceous armored dinosaur Animantarx
  †Animantarx – type locality for genus
  - †Animantarx ramaljonesi – type locality for species
- †Anisomyon
- Anomia
- †Anomoepus
- †Apatopus
  - †Apatopus lineatus
- †Apatosaurus
  - †Apatosaurus louisae – type locality for species
- †Apistodon – report made of unidentified related form or using admittedly obsolete nomenclature
  - †Apistodon exiguus – or unidentified related form
- †Aquiladelphis – tentative report
  - †Aquiladelphis laurae – type locality for species
- †Araeodon
  - †Araeodon intermissus
- †Araucariacites
  - †Araucariacites australis
  - †Araucariacites fissus
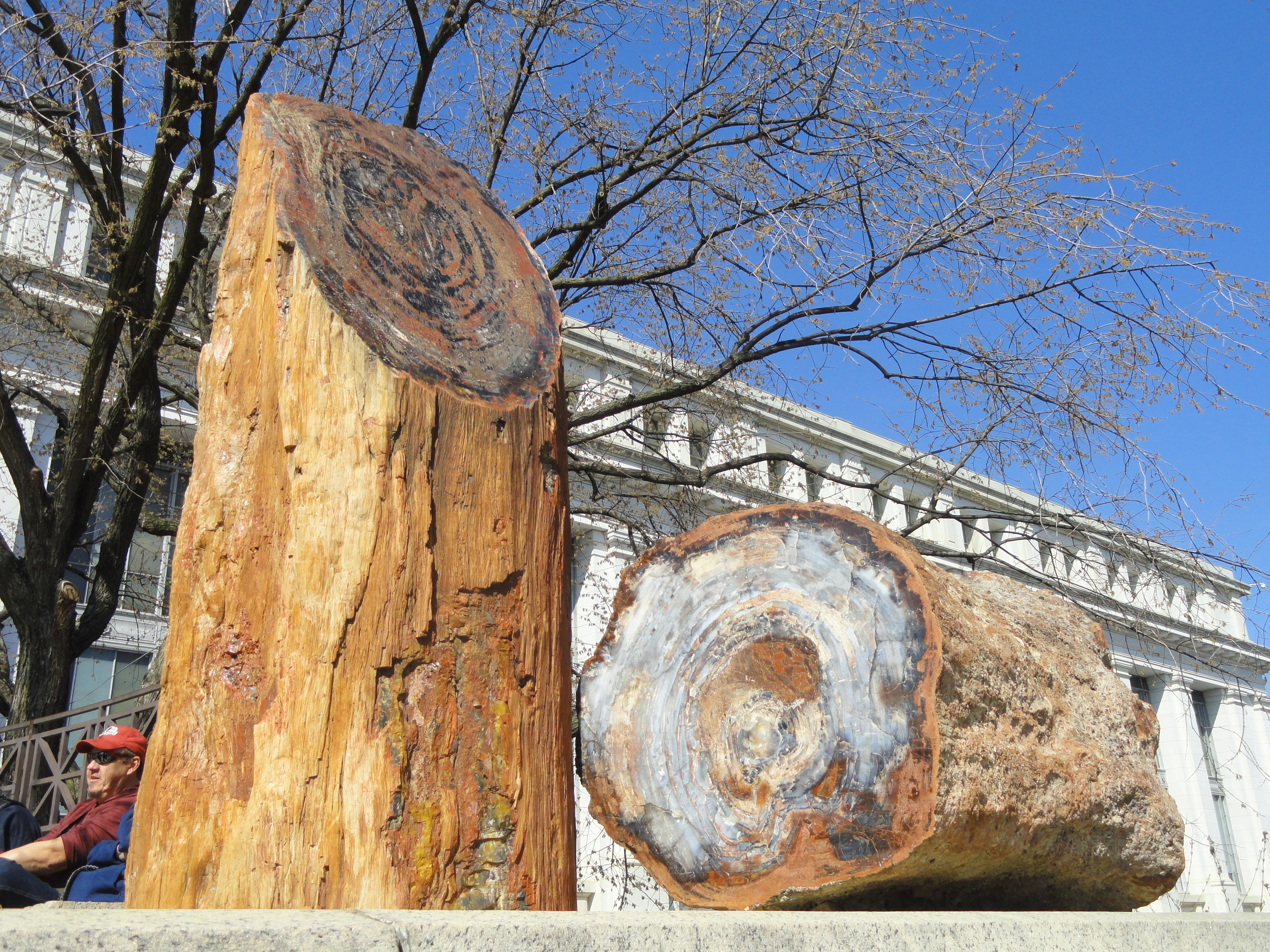
- Petrified trunk segments of the Permian-Late Triassic conifer tree Araucarioxylon arizonicum
  †Araucarioxylon
- †Arcomya
- †Arctoceras
  - †Arctoceras tuberculatum
- †Arctoprionites
  - †Arctoprionites resseri
- †Arvinachelys – type locality for genus
  - †Arvinachelys goldeni – type locality for species
- †Aspenites
  - †Aspenites acutus
- Astarte
  - †Astarte livingstonensis
  - †Astarte meeki
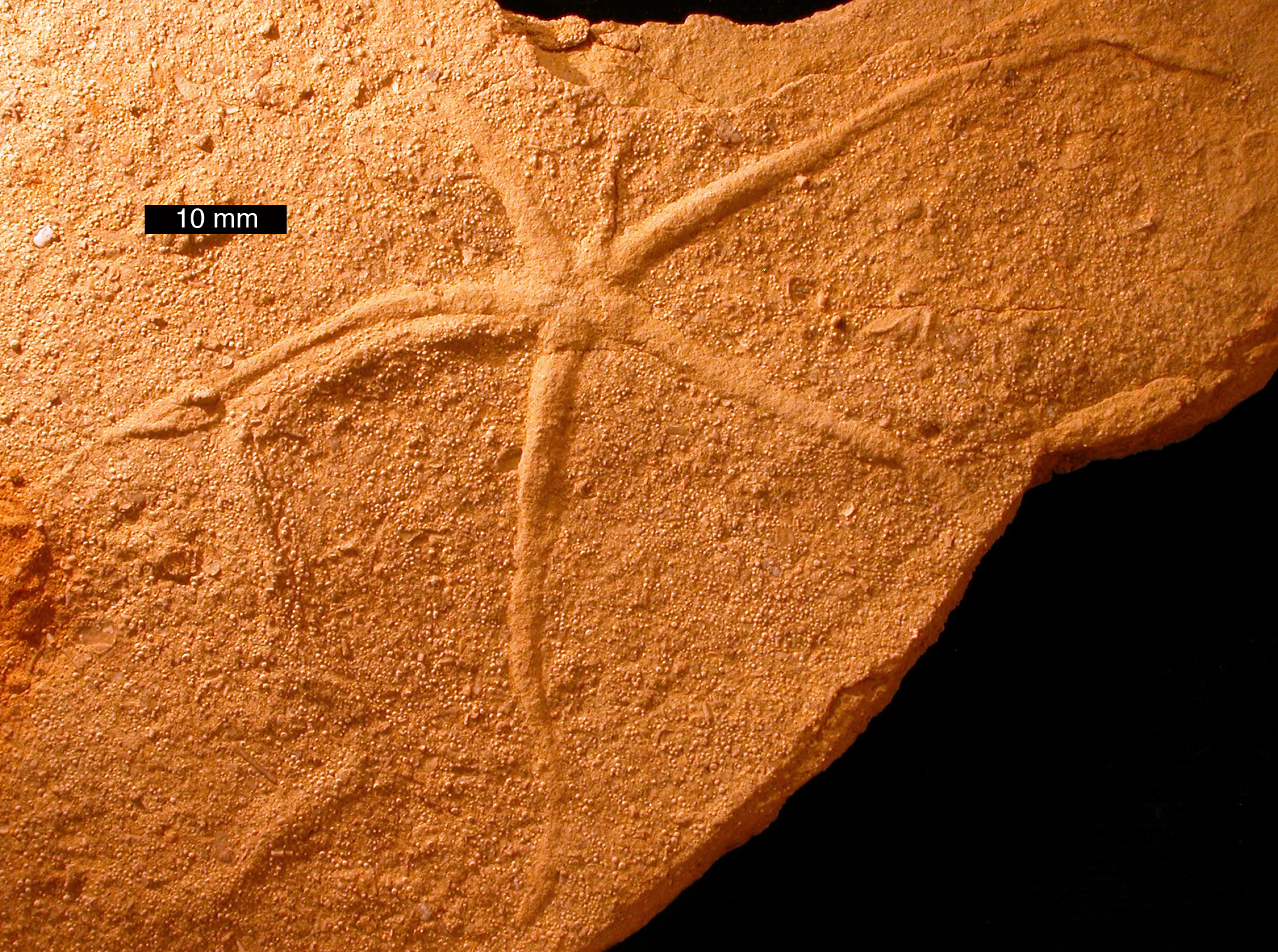
- Fossil of the Ordovician-Modern sea star trace fossil ichnogenus Asteriacites
  Asteriacites
  - †Asteriacites lumbricalis
- †Astralopteris
  - †Astralopteris coloradica
- †Astroconodon
  - †Astroconodon delicatus – type locality for species
- †Atreipus
  - †Atreipus milfordensis
- †Athenar – type locality for genus
  - †Athenar bermani – type locality for species
- †Aublysodon – tentative report
- †Aucellina
- †Austrotindaria
  - †Austrotindaria canalensis
  - †Austrotindaria svalbardensis
- †Avitotherium – type locality for genus
  - †Avitotherium utahensis – type locality for species

== B ==
- †Baena
- †Baibisha – or unidentified comparable form
- †Bajarunia
  - †Bajarunia confusionensis – type locality for species
- †Bakevellia
  - †Bakevellia costata
  - †Bakevellia costatus – or unidentified comparable form
  - †Bakevellia exporrecta
  - †Bakevellia silberlingi – type locality for species
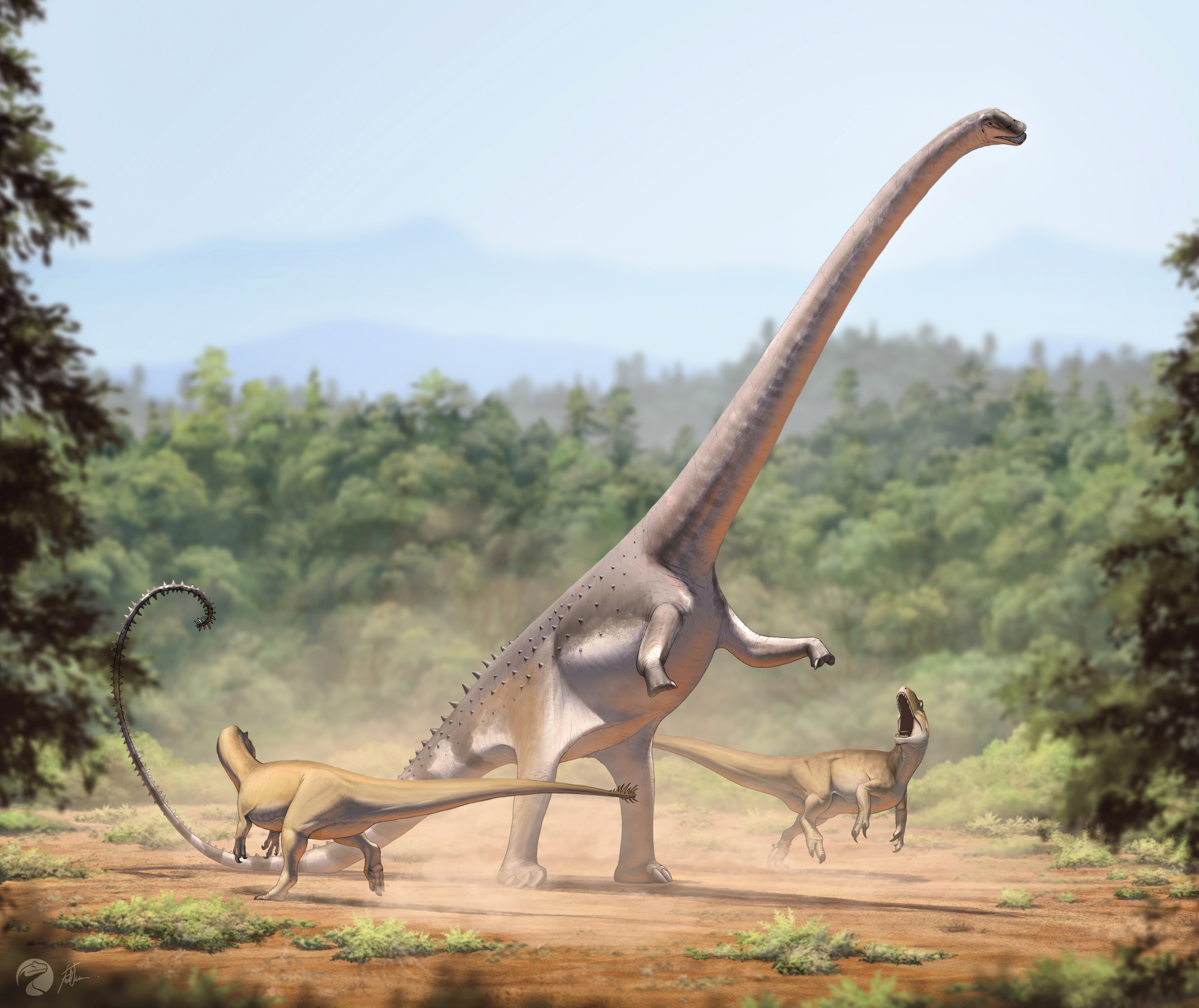
- Life reconstruction of an individual rearing up to defend itself against a pair of Allosaurus
  †Barosaurus
  - †Barosaurus lentus
- †Basilemys
- †Batrachopus
- †Battenizyga
  - †Battenizyga eotriassica – type locality for species
- †Bernissartia
- †Bicuspidon – type locality for genus
  - †Bicuspidon numerosus – type locality for species
  - †Bicuspidon smikros – type locality for species
- †Borissiakoceras
- †Bothriagenys – type locality for genus
  - †Bothriagenys mysterion – type locality for species
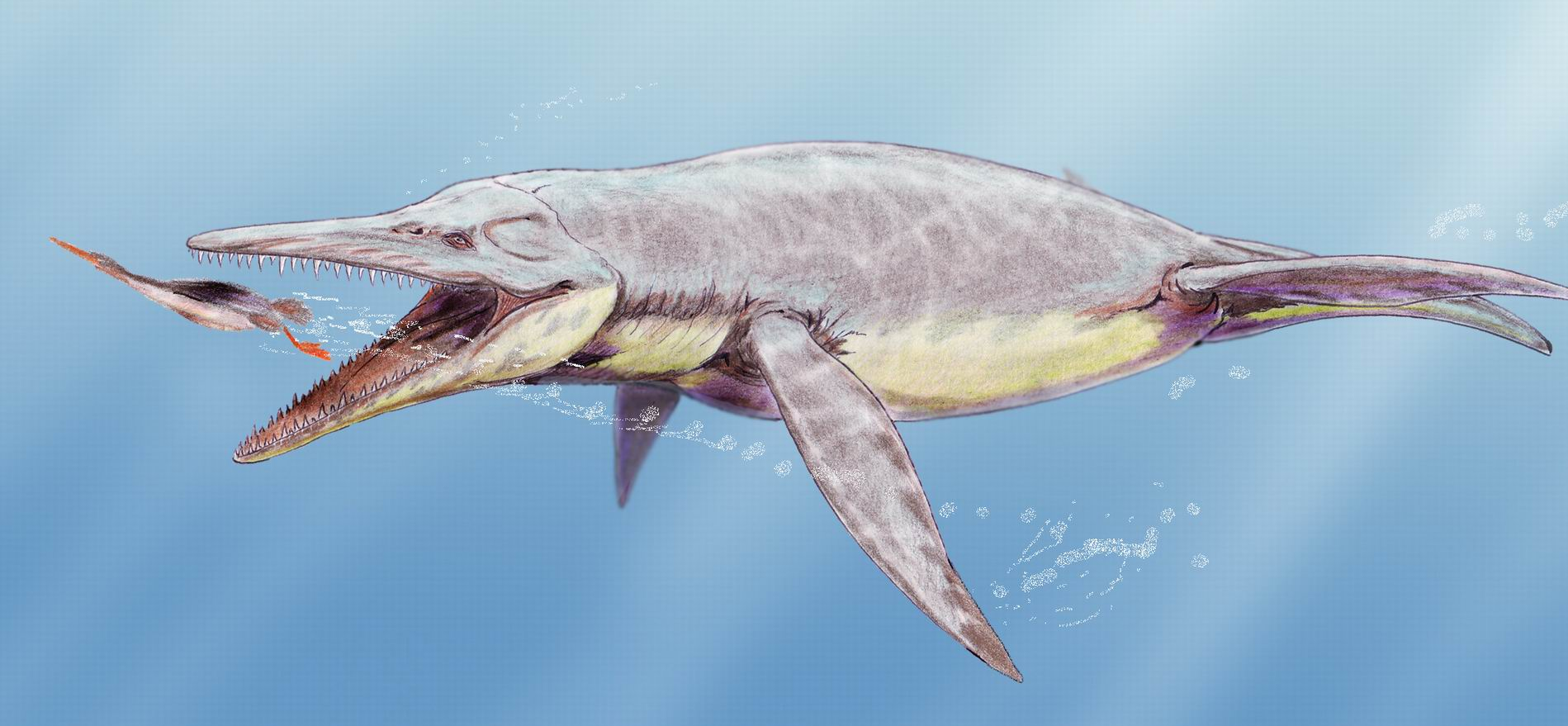
- Life restoration of the Late Cretaceous plesiosaur Brachauchenius hunting a hesperornithiform bird
  †Brachauchenius
  - †Brachauchenius lucasi
- †Brachiosaurus
- †Brachychirotherium
  - †Brachychirotherium thuringiacum
- †Brachyphyllum
  - †Brachyphyllum crassicaule
- †Brasilichnium
- †Brontomerus – type locality for genus
  - †Brontomerus mcintoshi – type locality for species
- †Brontopodus
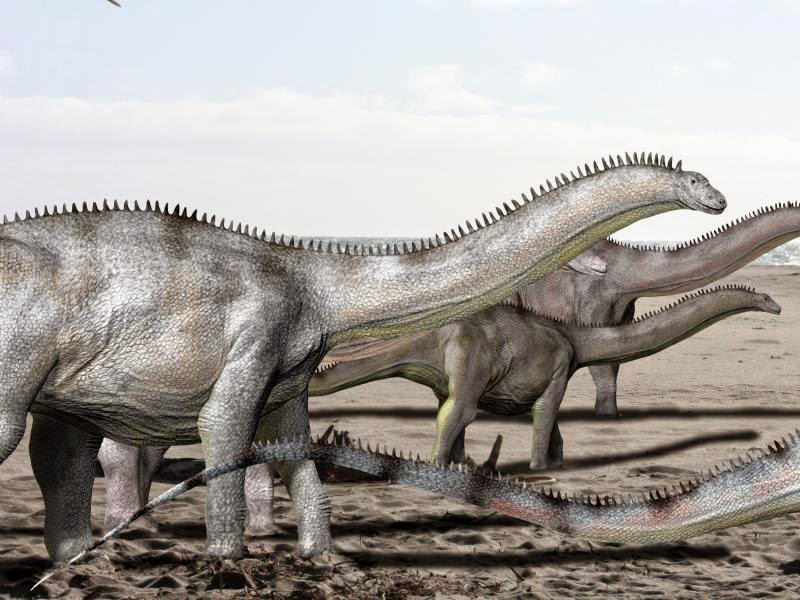
- Life restoration of a herd of the Late Jurassic sauropod dinosaur Brontosaurus
  †Brontosaurus
  - †Brontosaurus parvus
- †Brownichnus
  - †Brownichnus favosites – type locality for species
- †Bryceomys
  - †Bryceomys fumosus – type locality for species
  - †Bryceomys hadrosus
  - †Bryceomys intermedius – type locality for species

== C ==
- †Callialasporites
  - †Callialasporites segmentatus
  - †Callialasporites turbatus
- Callistina
  - †Callistina alta – or unidentified related form
- †Calycoceras
  - †Calycoceras naviculare
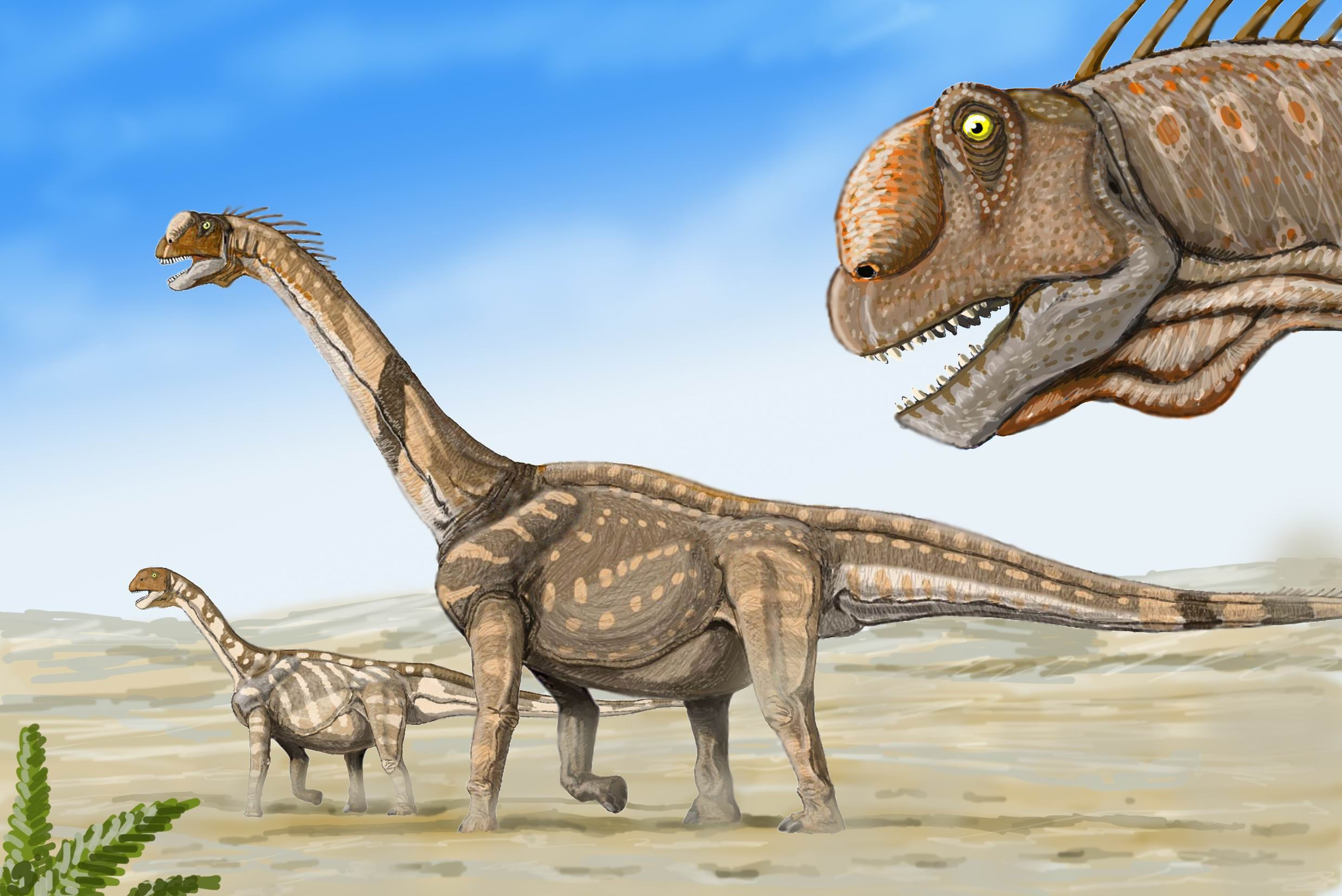
- Life restoration of a herd of the Late Jurassic sauropod dinosaur Camarasaurus
  †Camarasaurus – type locality for genus
  - †Camarasaurus lentus – type locality for species
- Campeloma
- †Camptonectes
  - †Camptonectes platessiformis
  - †Camptonectes stygius
- †Camptosaurus
  - †Camptosaurus dispar
- †Cantioscyllium – or unidentified comparable form
- †Carmelopodus – type locality for genus
  - †Carmelopodus untermannorum – type locality for species
- †Carycorbula
  - †Carycorbula nematophora
- †Cassiope
  - †Cassiope utahensis
- †Cedaromys
  - †Cedaromys bestia – type locality for species
  - †Cedaromys hutchisoni – or unidentified comparable form
  - †Cedaromys minimus – type locality for species
  - †Cedaromys parvus – type locality for species
- †Cedarosaurus – type locality for genus
  - †Cedarosaurus weiskopfae – type locality for species
- †Cedarpelta – type locality for genus
  - †Cedarpelta bilbeyhallorum – type locality for species
- †Cedrorestes – type locality for genus
  - †Cedrorestes crichtoni – type locality for species
- †Cedroxylon
- †Ceratodus
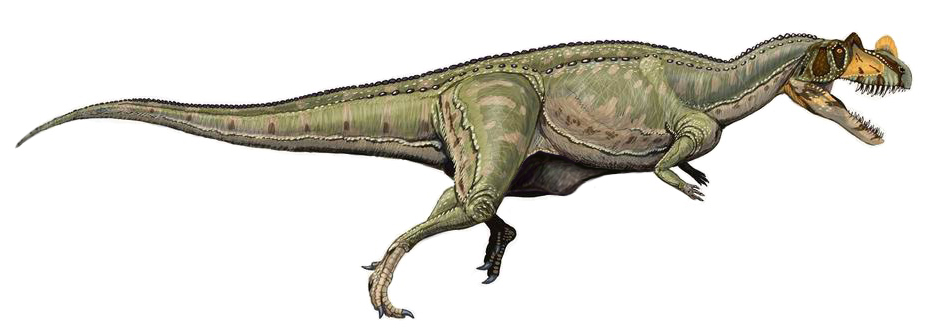
- Restoration of the Late Jurassic ceratosaur Ceratosaurus
  †Ceratosaurus
  - †Ceratosaurus nasicornis
  - †Ceratosaurus dentisulcatus – type locality for species
- †Cercomya
  - †Cercomya punctata
- †Cerebropollenites
  - †Cerebropollenites macroverruesus
- Cerithiopsis
- †Chamops
  - †Chamops segnis
- †Characichnos
- †Chartronella
  - †Chartronella pagina – type locality for species
  - †Chartronella unicostata – type locality for species
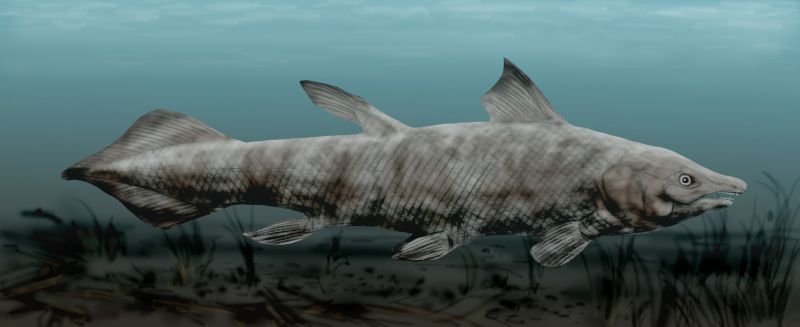
- Restoration of the Late Triassic coelacanth fish Chinlea
  †Chinlea – type locality for genus
  - †Chinlea sorenseni – type locality for species
- †Chirotherium
  - †Chirotherium rex – or unidentified comparable form
- Chlamys
- †Chondrites
- †Churkites
  - †Churkites noblei
- †Cimexomys
  - †Cimexomys antiquus – or unidentified comparable form
  - †Cimexomys gregoryi – type locality for species
- †Cimolodon
  - †Cimolodon electus
  - †Cimolodon nitidus – or unidentified comparable form
  - †Cimolodon similis
  - †Cimolodon wardi – type locality for species
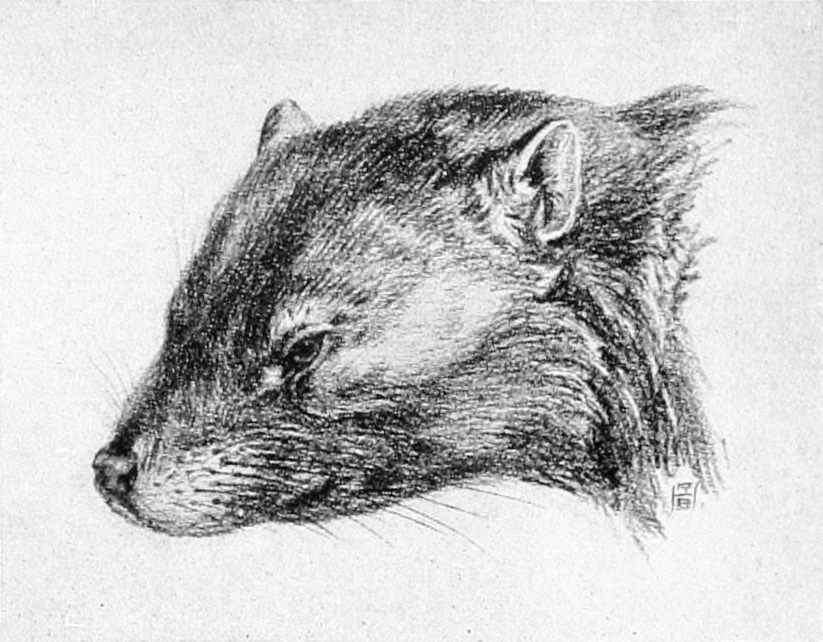
- Life restoration of the face of the Late Cretaceous multituberculate mammal Cimolomys
  †Cimolomys
  - †Cimolomys clarki
  - †Cimolomys milliensis – type locality for species
- †Cionichthys – type locality for genus
  - †Cionichthys dunklei – type locality for species
- Cladophlebis
  - †Cladophlebis constricta
  - †Cladophlebis parva
- †Claraia
- †Cnodontosaurus – type locality for genus
  - †Cnodontosaurus suchockii – type locality for species
- †Coelophysis – tentative report
- †Coelostylina
  - †Coelostylina angulifera – or unidentified comparable form
  - †Coelostylina costata – type locality for species
  - †Coelostylina virginensis – type locality for species
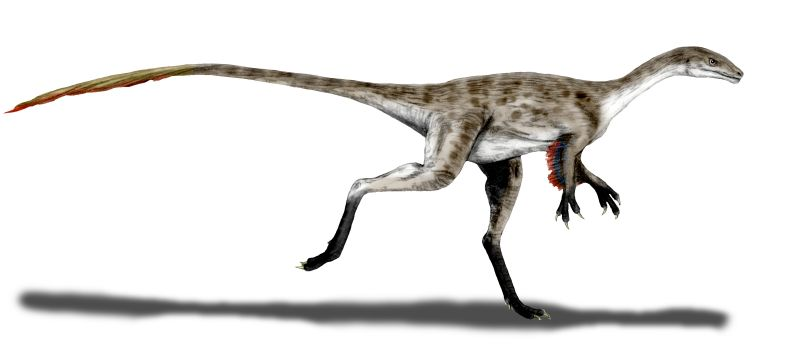
- Life restoration of the Late Jurassic primmitive tyrannosaur Coelurus
  †Coelurus
  - †Coelurus fragilis
- †Compsemys
- †Confusionella
  - †Confusionella loczyi
- †Coniophis
- †Coniopteris
  - †Coniopteris hymenophylloides
- †Contogenys
  - †Contogenys sloani – or unidentified comparable form
- Corbula
- †Cordillerites
  - †Cordillerites compressus
- †Corviconodon
  - †Corviconodon utahensis – type locality for species
- Cossmannea
  - †Cossmannea imayi
  - †Cossmannea imlayi
  - †Cossmannea kanabensis
- †Costatoria
- †Cowboyiceras – type locality for genus
  - †Cowboyiceras farwestense – type locality for species
- †Cretorectolobus
- †Crittendenia
- †Ctenacodon
- †Cteniogenys
- †Ctenostreon
  - †Ctenostreon gikshanensis – or unidentified comparable form
- Cucullaea
  - †Cucullaea haguei
- †Culicolestes – type locality for genus
  - †Culicolestes kielanae – type locality for species
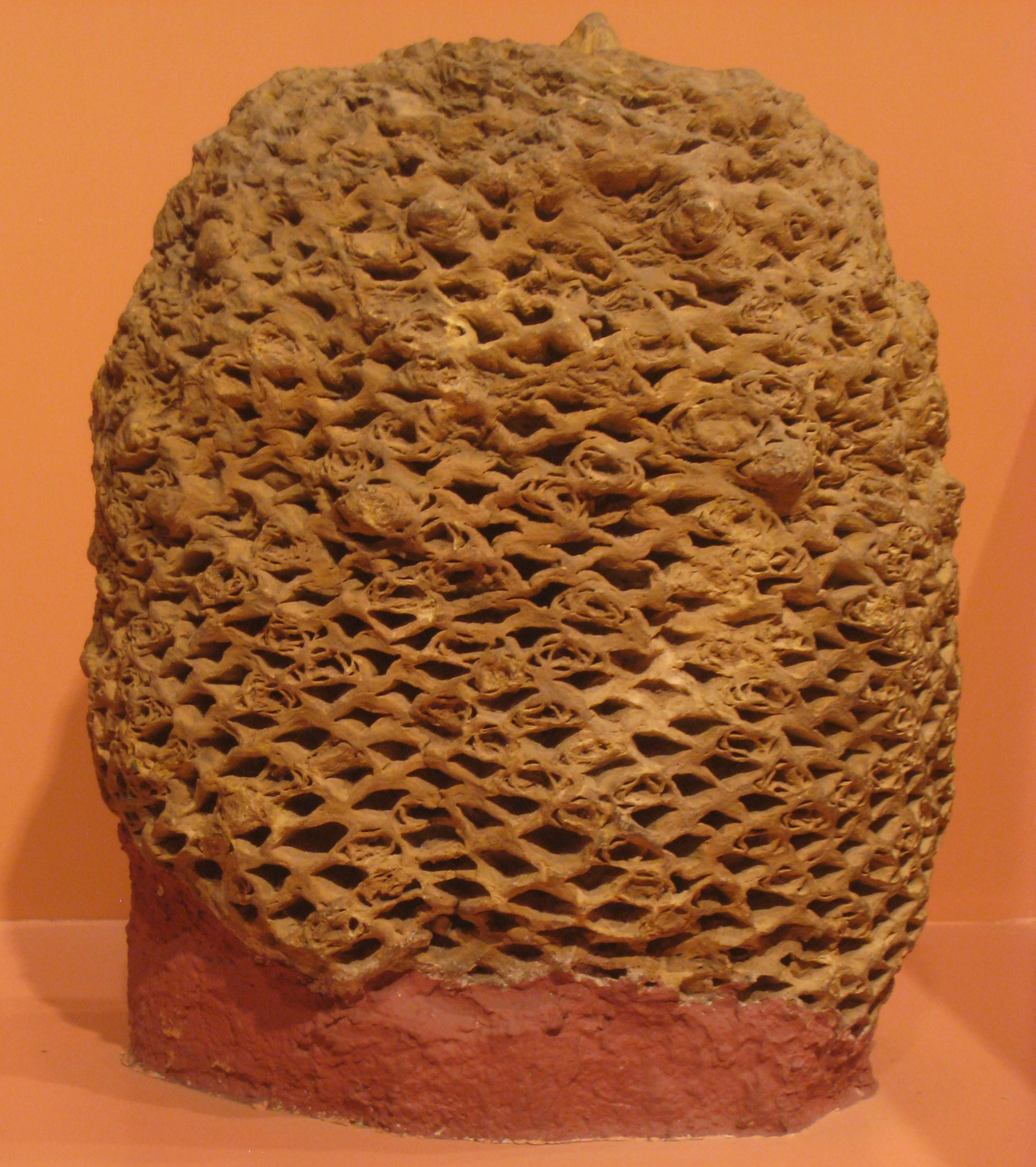
- Fossil of the Jurassic-Cretaceous cycad relative Cycadeoidea
  †Cycadeoidea
  - †Cycadeoidea cleavelandii
  - †Cycadeoidea medullara
- Cylichna
- †Cylindrobullina
  - †Cylindrobullina convexa – type locality for species
- †Cymbophora
- †Cynepteris
  - †Cynepteris lasiophora
- †Cypellospongia – type locality for genus
  - †Cypellospongia fimbriartis – type locality for species
- †Czekanowskia
  - †Czekanowskia turneri – type locality for species

== D ==
- †Dakotadens – type locality for genus
  - †Dakotadens morrowi – type locality for species
  - †Dakotadens pertritus – type locality for species
- †Dakotamys
  - †Dakotamys malcolmi – type locality for species
- †Dakotaseps – type locality for genus
  - †Dakotaseps gillettorum – type locality for species
- †Dakotasuchus
  - †Dakotasuchus kingi
- †Deinonychus
- †Deinosuchus
  - †Deinosuchus hatcheri
- †Denazinemys
  - †Denazinemys nodosa
- Dentalium
  - †Dentalium sublineatum – or unidentified related form
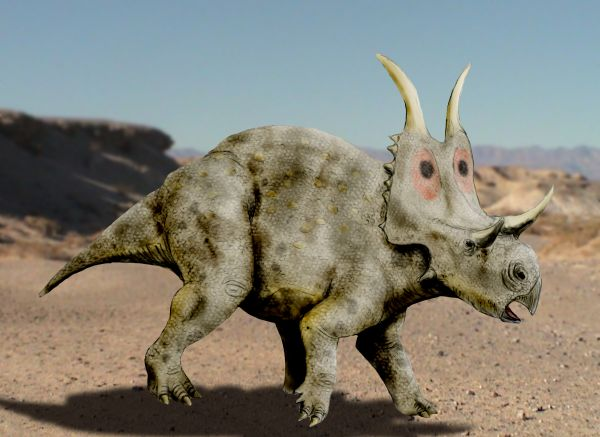
- Restoration of the Late Cretaceous horned dinosaur Diabloceratops
  †Diabloceratops – type locality for genus
  - †Diabloceratops eatoni – type locality for species
- †Dicothodon – type locality for genus
  - †Dicothodon cifelli
  - †Dicothodon cifellii – type locality for species
  - †Dicothodon moorensis – type locality for species
- †Dieneroceras
  - †Dieneroceras dieneri
- †Dimekodontosaurus – type locality for genus
  - †Dimekodontosaurus madseni – type locality for species
- †Dinehichnus – type locality for genus
  - †Dinehichnus socialis – type locality for species
- †Dinochelys – type locality for genus
  - †Dinochelys whitei – type locality for species
- †Dinophyton
  - †Dinophyton spinosus
- †Dinosauropodes – type locality for genus
  - †Dinosauropodes bransfordii
  - †Dinosauropodes magrawii – type locality for species
  - †Dinosauropodes osborni
  - †Dinosauropodes wilsoni
- †Diplochilus – tentative report
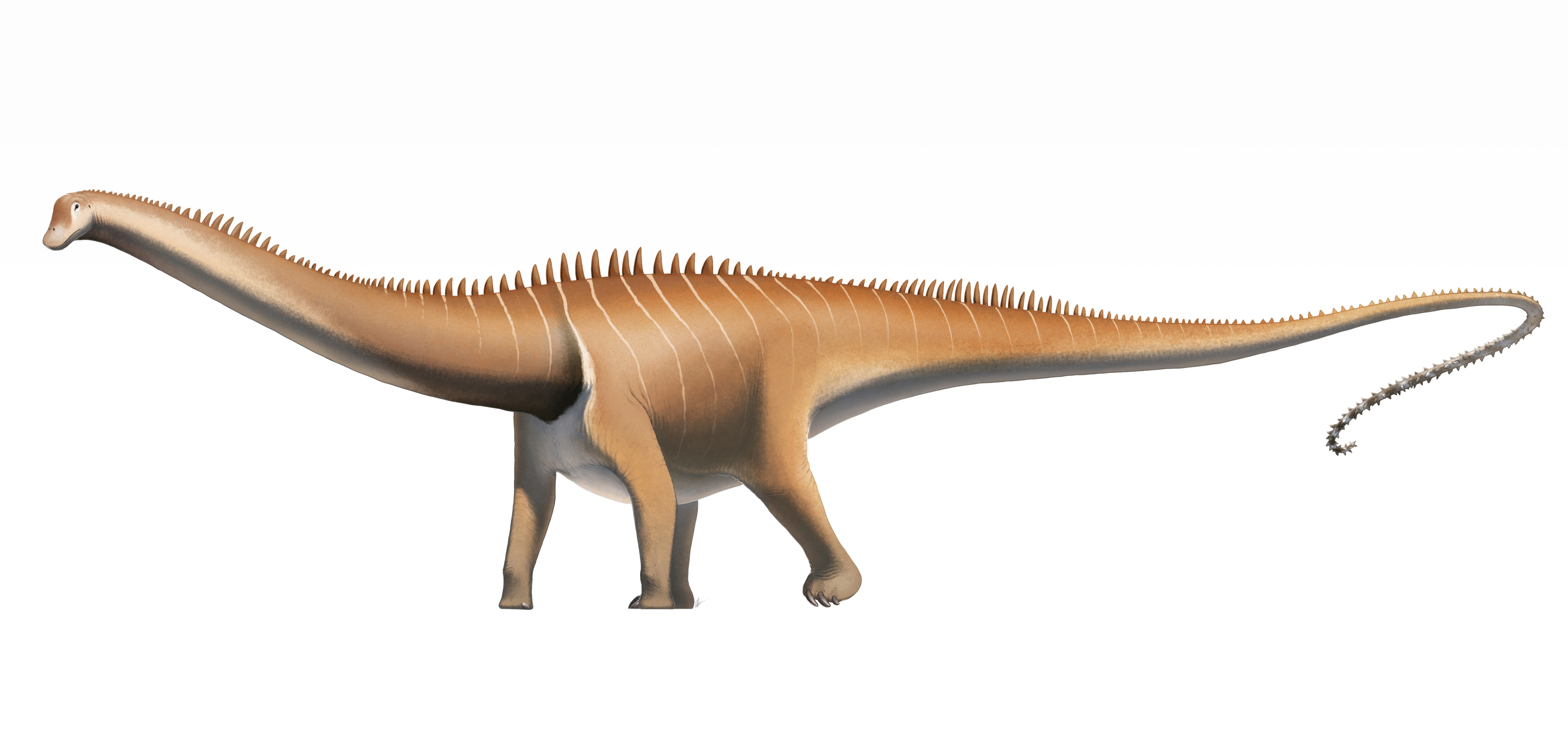
- Life restoration of the Late Jurassic long-necked dinosaur Diplodocus
  †Diplodocus
  - †Diplodocus hallorum
  - †Diplodocus longus
- Discinisca – report made of unidentified related form or using admittedly obsolete nomenclature
- †Docodon
- †Doswellia
- †Drepanocheilus
  - †Drepanocheilus ruidium
- †Dryolestes
  - †Dryolestes priscus
- †Dryosaurus
  - †Dryosaurus elderae – type locality for species
- †Dystrophaeus – type locality for genus
  - †Dystrophaeus viaemalae – type locality for species

== E ==
- †Elegantinia
- Elliptio
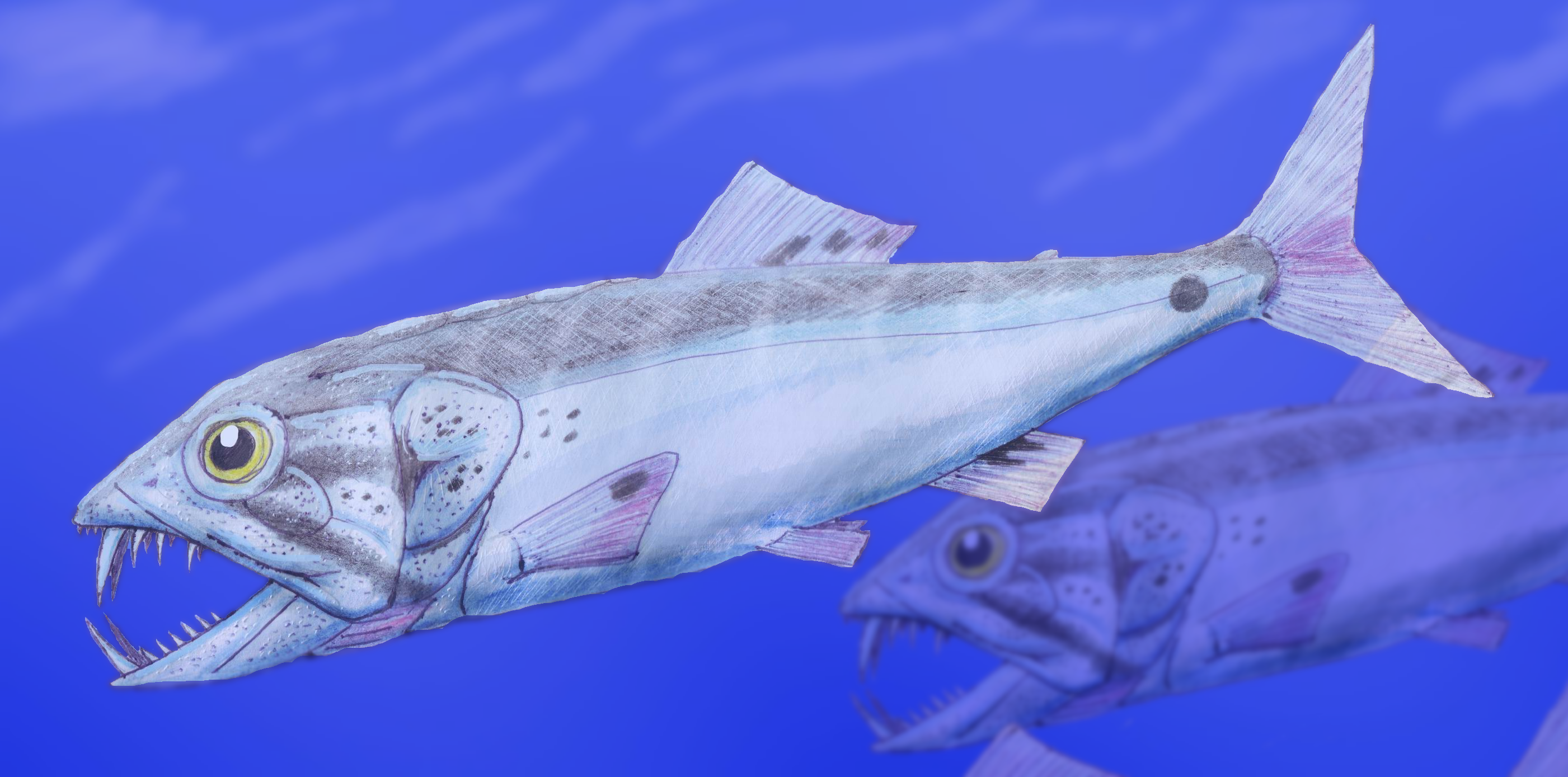
- Restoration of the Early Cretaceous-Eocene bony fish Enchodus, or the "saber-toothed herring"
  †Enchodus
- †Enneabatrachus
- †Entalophora
  - †Entalophora stokesi
- †Entolioides
- †Entolium
- †Entradasuchus – type locality for genus
  - †Entradasuchus spinosus – type locality for species
- †Eoalphadon
  - †Eoalphadon clemensi – type locality for species
  - †Eoalphadon lillegraveni – type locality for species
  - †Eoalphadon woodburnei – type locality for species
- †Eocephalites
  - †Eocephalites primus
- †Eodelphis
- †Eoginkgoites
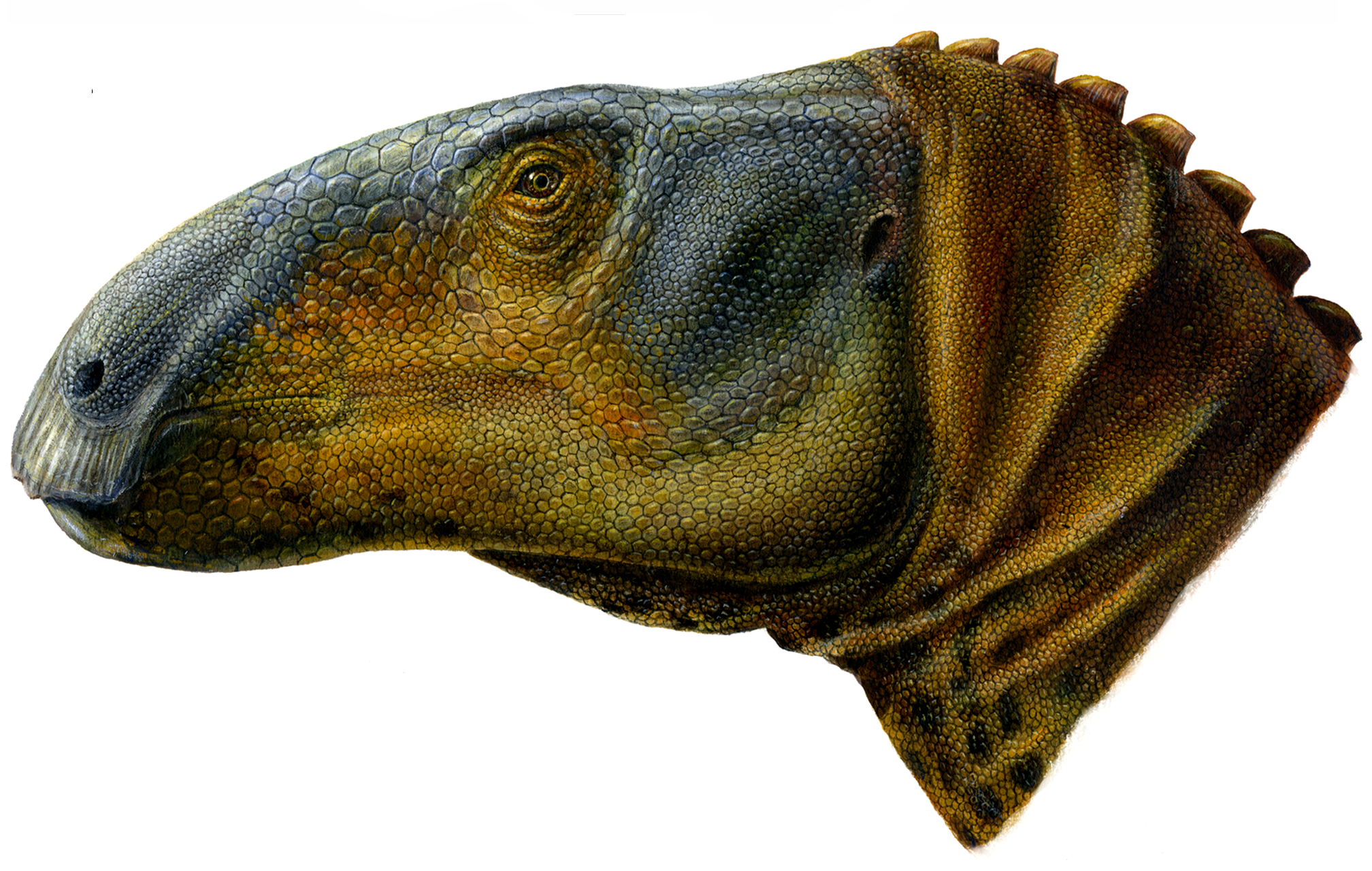
- Illustration of a reconstructed skull and restorative portrait of the Late Cretaceous primitive duck-billed dinosaur Eolambia
  †Eolambia – type locality for genus
  - †Eolambia caroljonesa – type locality for species
- †Eopolycotylus – type locality for genus
  - †Eopolycotylus rankini – type locality for species
- †Equisetites
- †Equisetum
  - †Equisetum burchardtii
  - †Equisetum UD006 – informal
- †Eryma
  - †Eryma jungostrix
- †Eucalyptus
  - †Eucalyptus dakotensis
- †Eumorphotis
  - †Eumorphotis beneckei – or unidentified comparable form
  - †Eumorphotis ericius – type locality for species
  - †Eumorphotis hinnitidea
  - †Eumorphotis multiformis
  - †Eumorphotis venetiana
  - †Eumorphotis virginensis – type locality for species
- †Eunaticina
  - †Eunaticina textilis
- †Euomphaloceras
- †Euspira
  - †Euspira concinna
- †Euthlastus
  - †Euthlastus cordiformis
- †Eutretauranosuchus
- †Evazoum
- †Exesipollenites
  - †Exesipollenites tumulosus
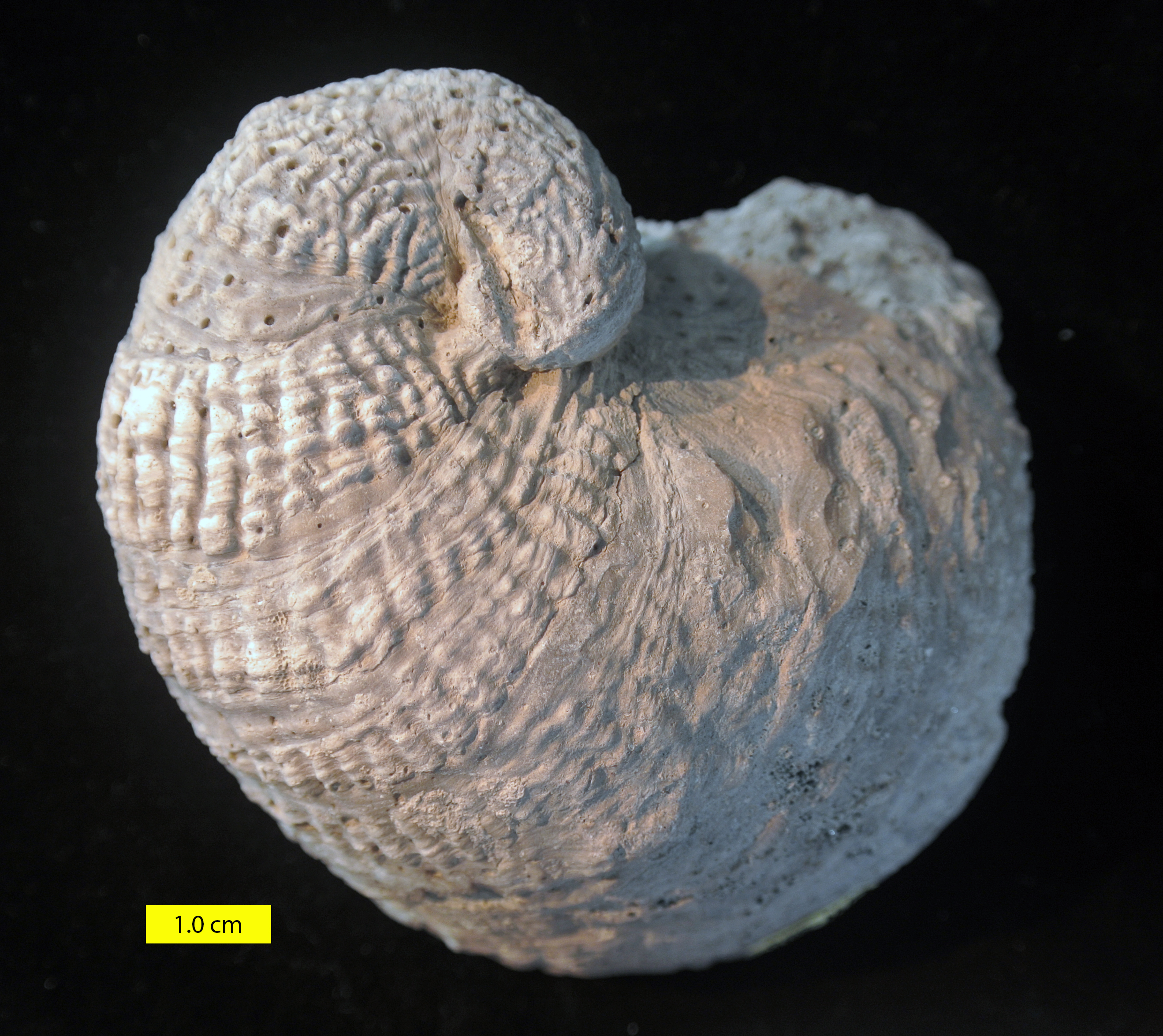
- Fossilized shell of the Jurassic-Cretaceous foam oyster Exogyra
  †Exogyra
  - †Exogyra acroumbonata
  - †Exogyra levis
- †Exostinus – or unidentified comparable form

== F ==
- †Fabrosaurus – tentative report
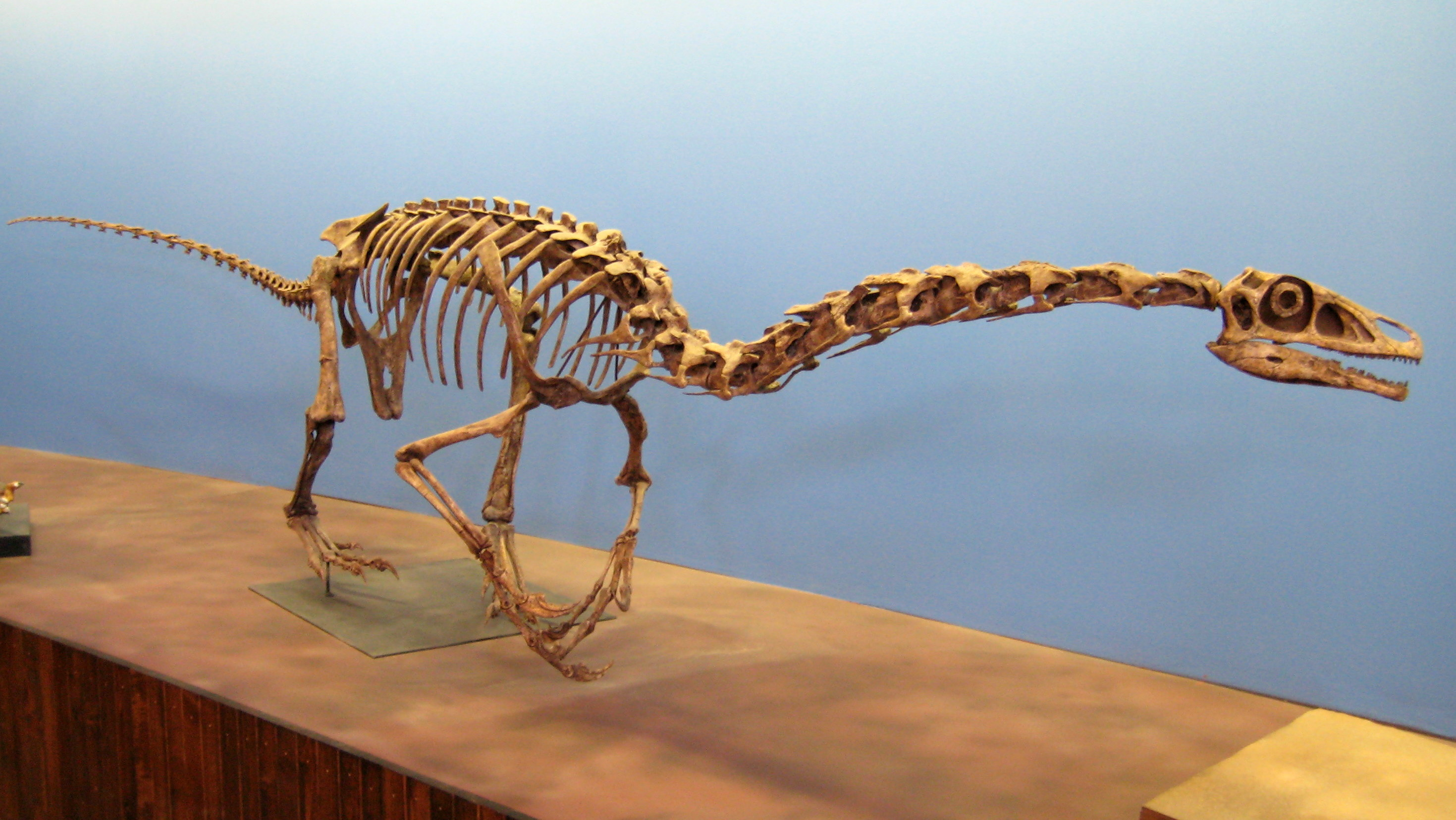
- Fossilized skeleton of the Early Cretaceous therizinossaur Falcarius
  †Falcarius – type locality for genus
  - †Falcarius utahensis – type locality for species
- Ficus
  - †Ficus daphnogenoides
- †Flemingites
- †Fona – type locality for genus
  - †Fona herzogae – type locality for species
- †Frenelopsis
  - †Frenelopsis varians
  - †Frenelopsis variens

== G ==
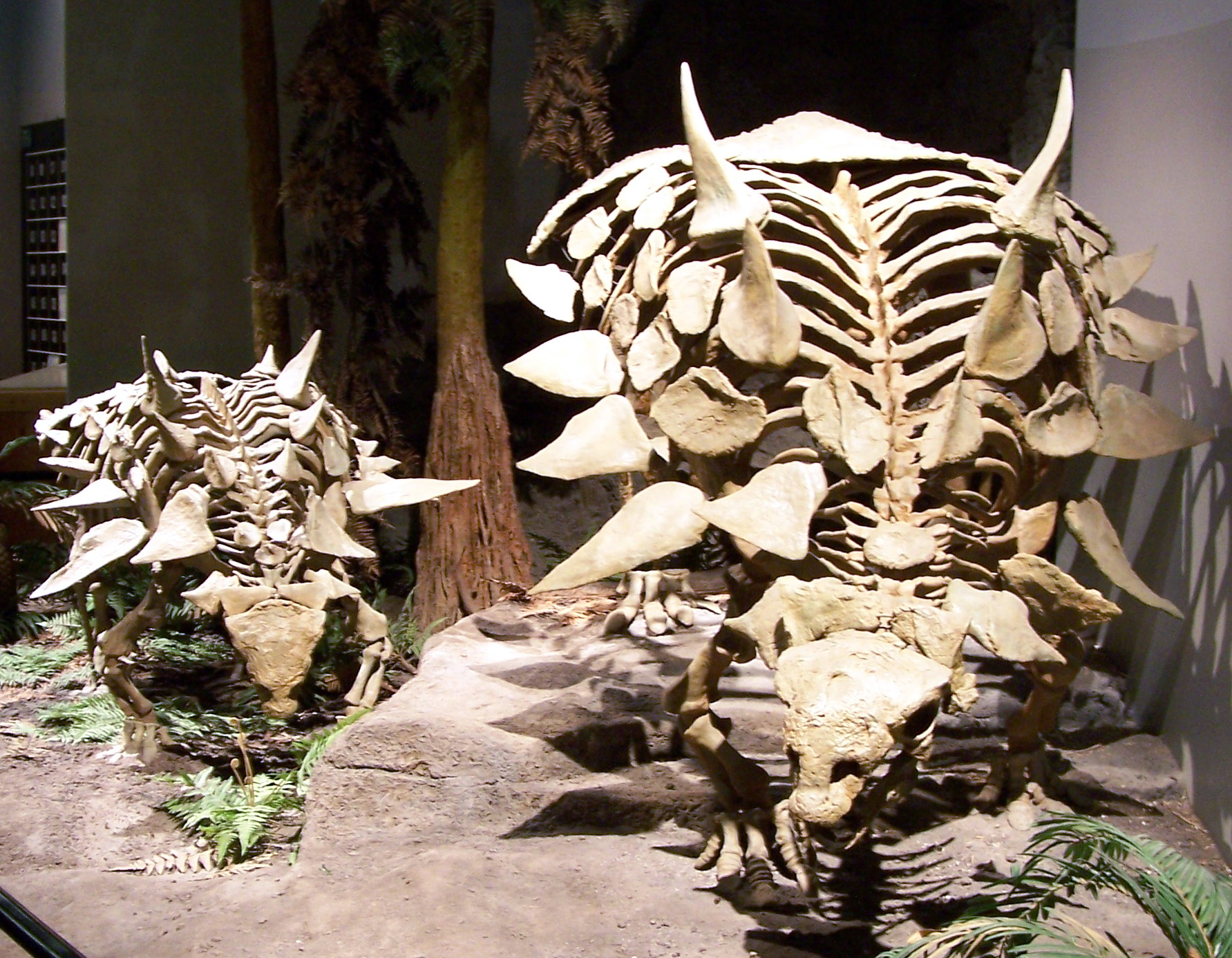
- Mounted fossilized skeletons of the Early Cretaceous armored dinosaur Gastonia
  †Gastonia – type locality for genus
  - †Gastonia burgei – type locality for species
  - †Gastonia lorriemcwhinneyae – type locality for species
- †Geltena
- †Geminiraptor
  - †Geminiraptor suarezarum
- †Germanonautilus – tentative report
- †Gervillaria
  - †Gervillaria montanaensis
- †Gervillia
- Gleichenia
  - †Gleichenia comptoniaefolia
  - †Gleichenia delicatula
- †Glirodon – type locality for genus
  - †Glirodon grandis – type locality for species
- Globularia – tentative report
- †Glyptops
  - †Glyptops plicatulus – type locality for species
- †Gondolella
  - †Gondolella planata
- †Goniobasis – tentative report
  - †Goniobasis subtortuosa
- †Goniodiscus
  - †Goniodiscus smithi
- †Goniomya
  - †Goniomya montanaensis
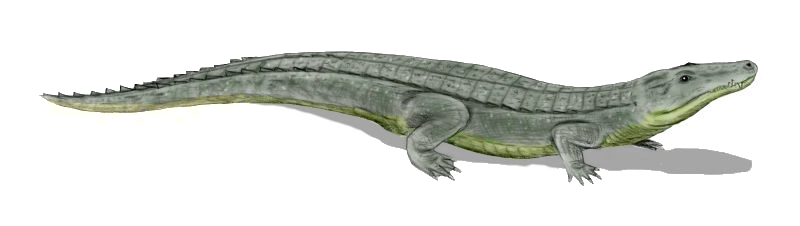
- Restoration of the Late Jurassic-Early Cretaceous crocodile relative Goniopholis
  †Goniopholis
- †Grallator
  - †Grallator cursorius
- †Grammatodon
  - †Grammatodon haguei
- †Gryphaea
  - †Gryphaea planoconvexa
- †Gryphaeostrea
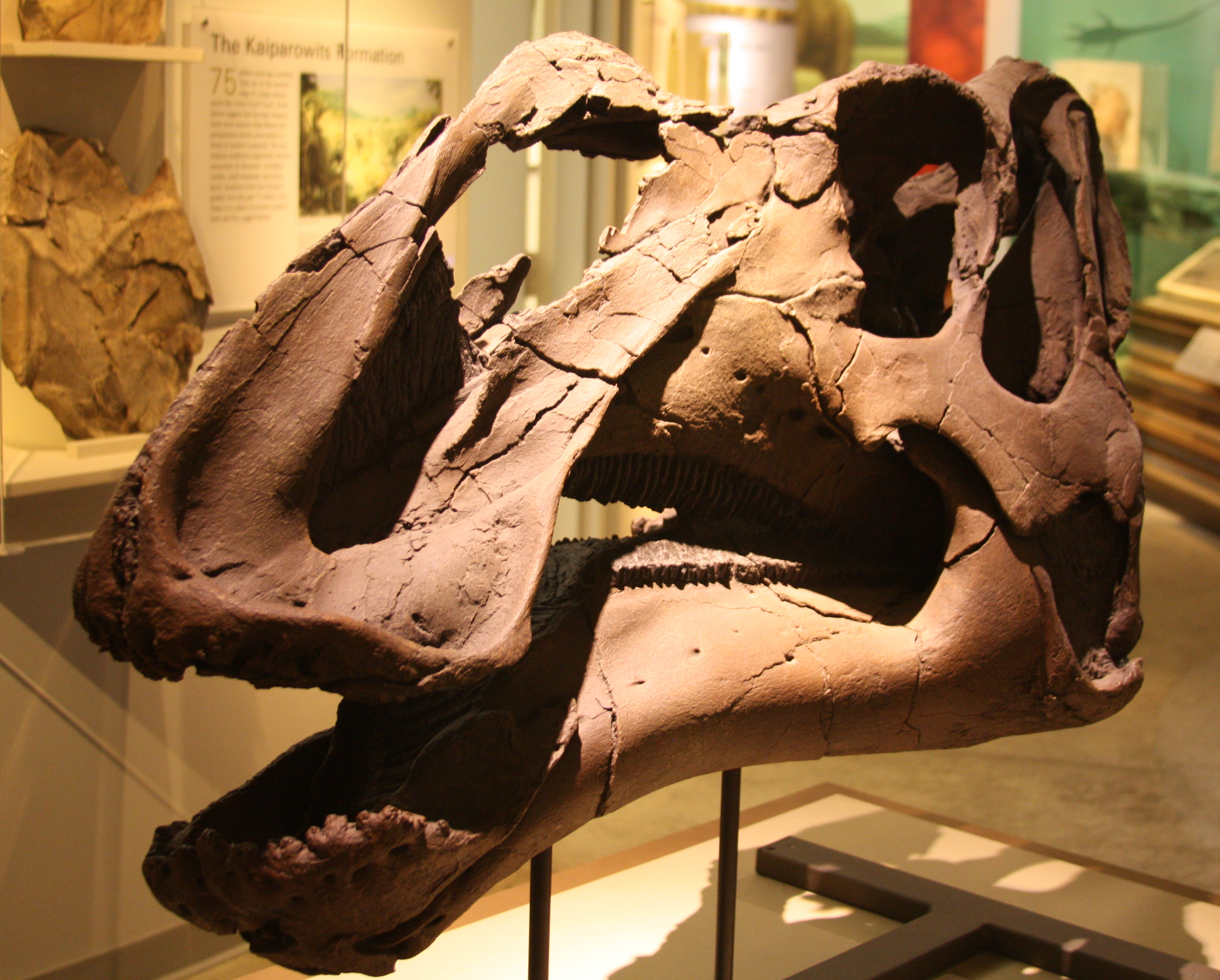
- Mounted fossilized skeleton of the Late Cretaceous duck-billed dinosaur Gryposaurus
  †Gryposaurus
  - †Gryposaurus monumentensis – type locality for species
- †Guodunites
  - †Guodunites hooveri
- †Gwyneddichnium
- †Gypsonictops

== H ==
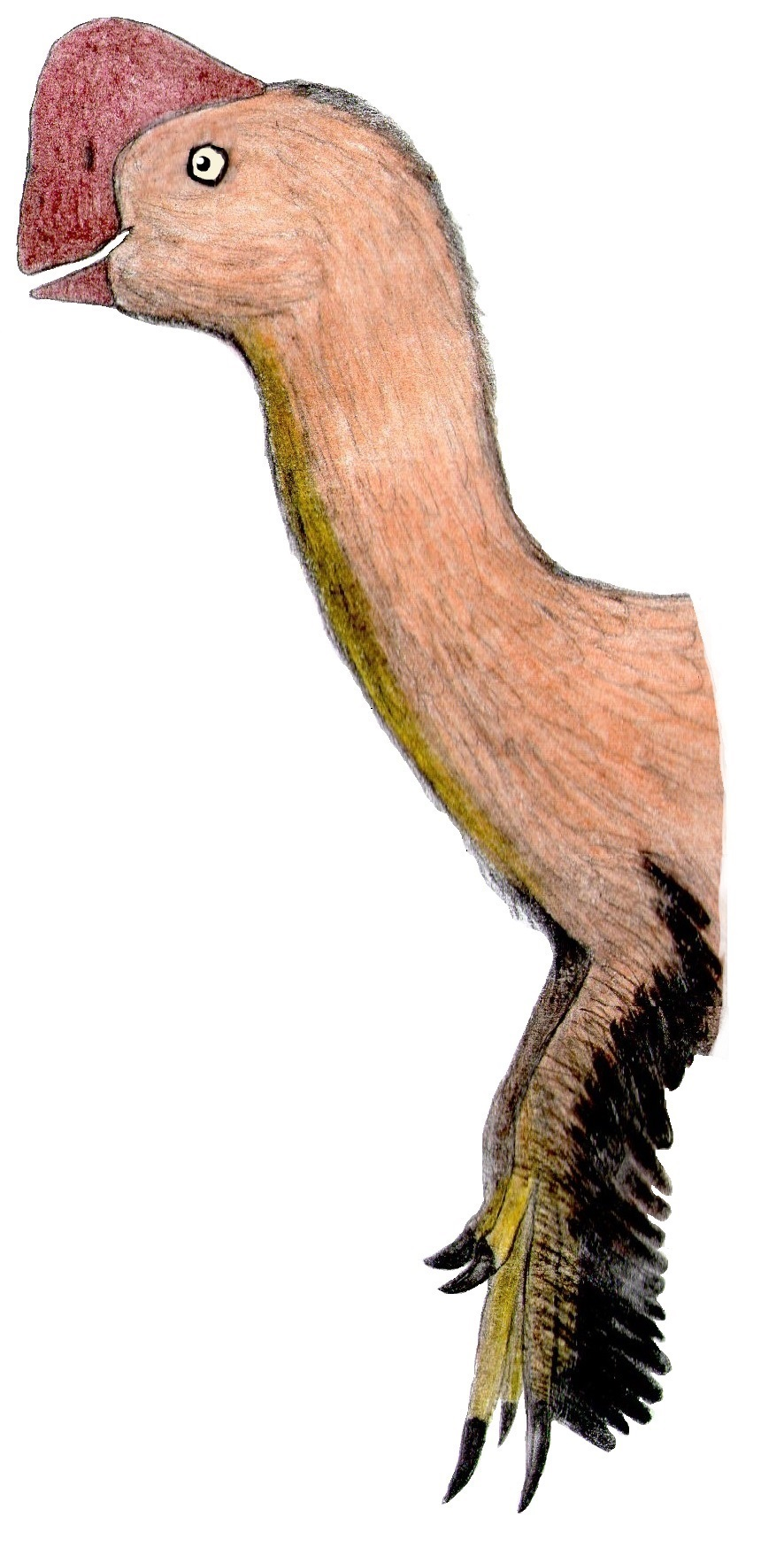
- Life restoration of the Late Cretaceous oviraptorosaur Hagryphus
  †Hagryphus – type locality for genus
  - †Hagryphus giganteus – type locality for species
- †Hamulus – tentative report
  - †Hamulus subquadratus
- †Hanielites
- †Harmodontosaurus – type locality for genus
  - †Harmodontosaurus emeryensis – type locality for species
- †Hausmania
  - †Hausmania rigida
- †Hedenstroemia
  - †Hedenstroemia kossmati
- Hemiaster
  - †Hemiaster humphreysanus
- †Hemicalypterus – type locality for genus
  - †Hemicalypterus weiri – type locality for species
- †Heminajas – tentative report
  - †Heminajas balatonis – or unidentified comparable form
- †Hemiprionites
  - †Hemiprionites typus
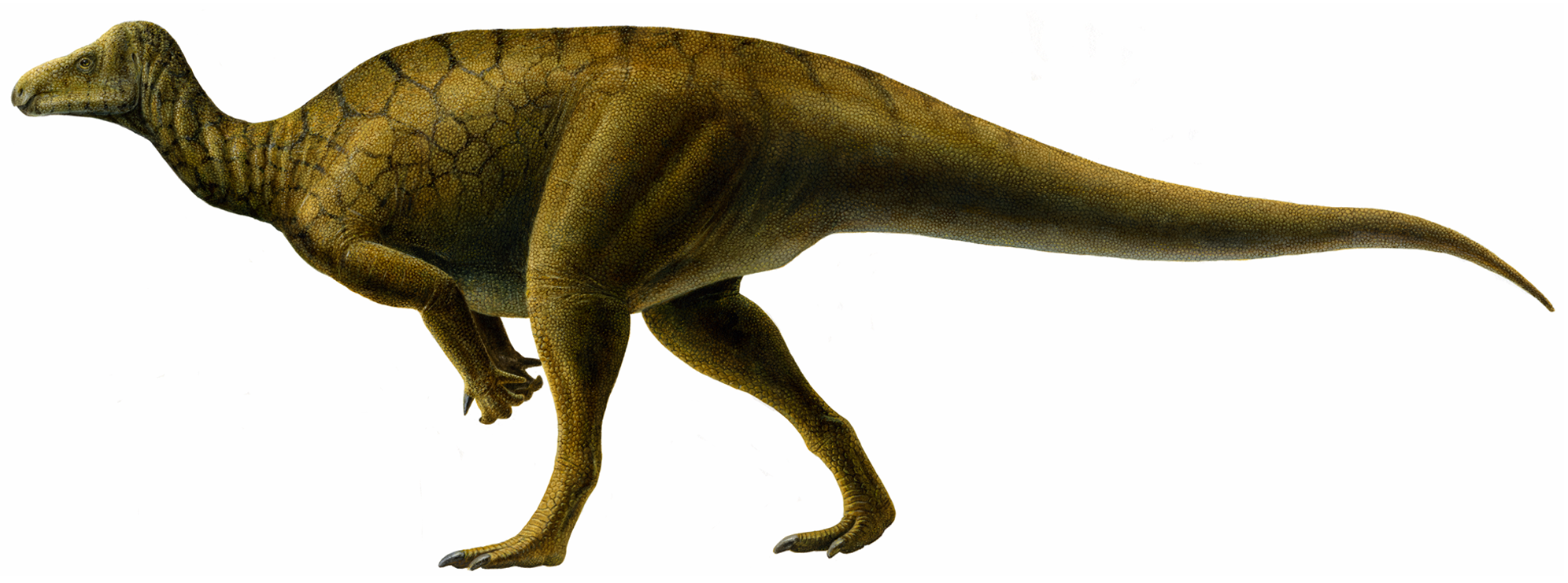
- Life restoration of the Early Cretaceous Iguanodon relative Hippodraco
  †Hippodraco – type locality for genus
  - †Hippodraco scutodens – type locality for species
- †Hispanosauropus
- †Hoernesia
- †Holocrinus
  - †Holocrinus dubius – tentative report
  - †Holocrinus smithi
- †Homalopoma
  - †Homalopoma sinbadensis – type locality for species
- †Homomya
- †Hoplitosaurus – or unidentified comparable form
- †Hoplosuchus – type locality for genus
  - †Hoplosuchus kayi – type locality for species
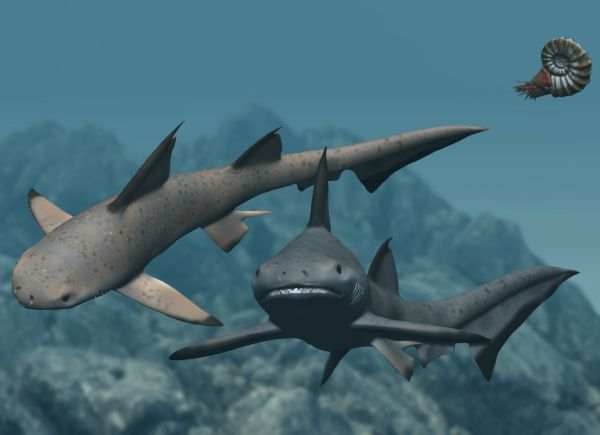
- Restoration of two of the Permian-Late Cretaceous cartilaginous fish Hybodus
  †Hybodus
- †Hyporosopora
  - †Hyporosopora nielsoni – type locality for species

== I ==
- †Iani – type locality for genus
  - †Iani smithi – type locality for species
- †Icacinoxylon
  - †Icacinoxylon pittiense – type locality for species
- †Idahocolumbites
  - †Idahocolumbites cheneyi
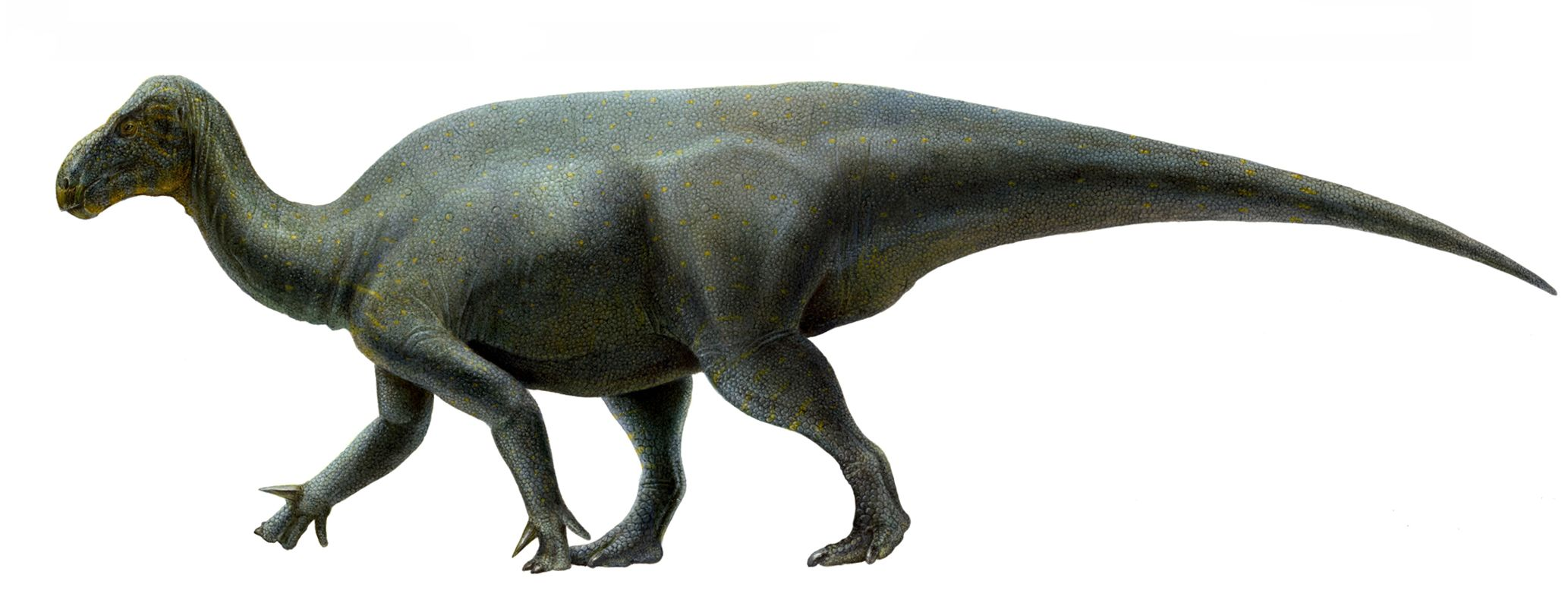
- Life restoration of the Early Cretaceous Iguanodon relative Iguanacolossus
  †Iguanacolossus – type locality for genus
  - †Iguanacolossus fortis – type locality for species
- †Iguanodon
  - †Iguanodon ottingeri – type locality for species
- Ilex
  - †Ilex serrata
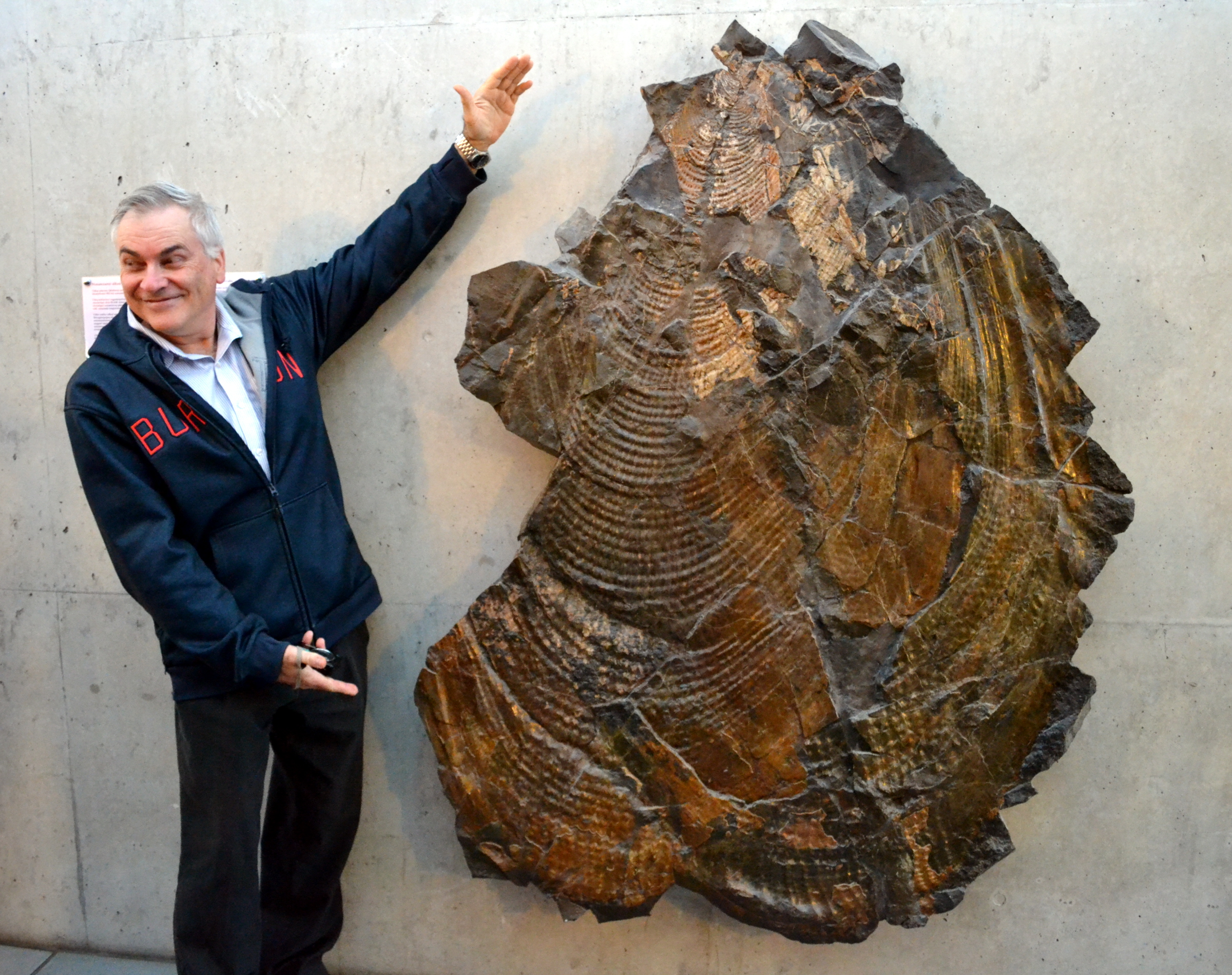
- Fossilized shell of the Early Jurassic-Late Cretaceous marine bivalve Inoceramus with a human indicating its size
  †Inoceramus
  - †Inoceramus albertensis – or unidentified comparable form
  - †Inoceramus flavus
  - †Inoceramus gilberti
  - †Inoceramus koeneni
  - †Inoceramus pictus
  - †Inoceramus tenuistriatus – tentative report
  - †Inoceramus undabundus
- †Inyoites
  - †Inyoites beaverensis – type locality for species
  - †Inyoites oweni
- †Iqualadelphis
  - †Iqualadelphis lactea
- †Iridotriton – type locality for genus
  - †Iridotriton hechti – type locality for species
- †Ischyrhiza – or unidentified comparable form
- Isocrinus
  - †Isocrinus nicoleti
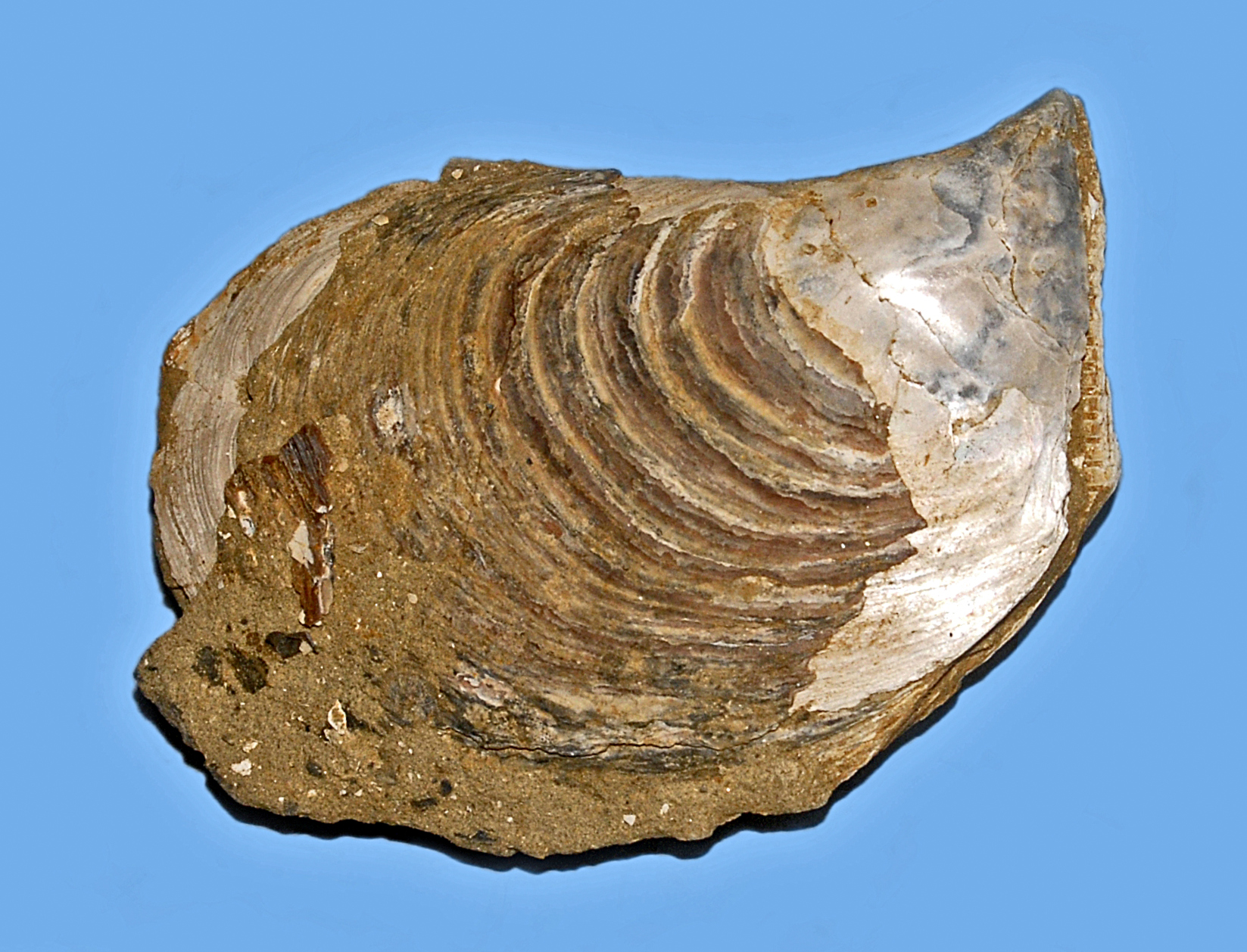
- Fossilized shell of the Permian-modern marine bivalve Isognomon
  Isognomon
  - †Isognomon perplana – or unidentified comparable form
- †Iugomortiferum – type locality for genus
  - †Iugomortiferum thoringtoni – type locality for species

== J ==
- †Janumys – type locality for genus
  - †Janumys erebos – type locality for species
  - †Janumys erebros
- †Jeanbesseiceras
  - †Jeanbesseiceras jacksoni
- †Jugulator
  - †Jugulator amplissimus
- †Juvenites
  - †Juvenites spathi – or unidentified related form
  - †Juvenites thermarum – or unidentified comparable form

== K ==
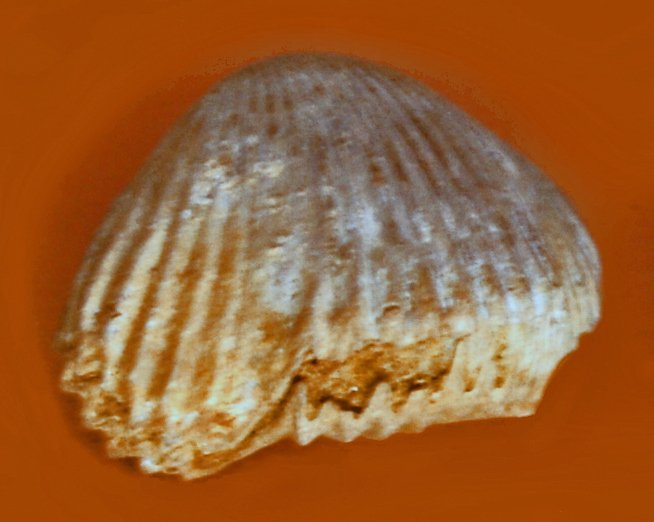
- Fossilized shells of the Jurassic brachiopod Kallirhynchia
  †Kallirhynchia
  - †Kallirhynchia myrina – type locality for species
- †Kamerunoceras
- †Kashmirites
  - †Kashmirites confusionensis
  - †Kashmirites meeki
  - †Kashmirites nivalis
  - †Kashmirites perrini
  - †Kashmirites seerleyi
  - †Kashmirites stepheni – type locality for species
  - †Kashmirites subarmatus
  - †Kashmirites utahensis – type locality for species
- †Kayentapus
- †Kokopellia – type locality for genus
  - †Kokopellia juddi – type locality for species
- †Koparion – type locality for genus
  - †Koparion douglassi – type locality for species
- †Koreanaornis
  - †Koreanaornis hamanensis – or unidentified comparable form
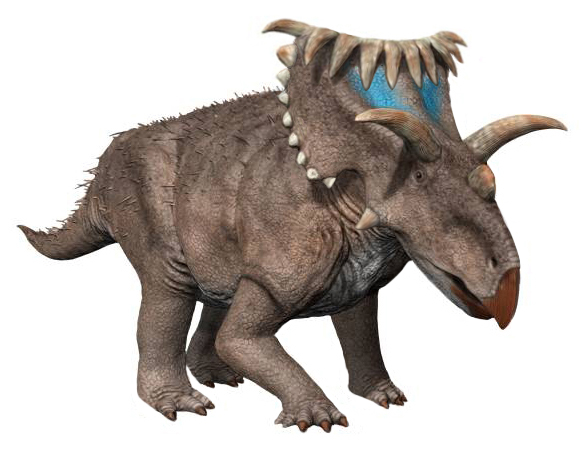
- Life restoration of the Late Cretaceous horned dinosaur Kosmoceratops
  †Kosmoceratops – type locality for genus
  - †Kosmoceratops richardsoni – type locality for species
- †Kouphichnium

== L ==
- †Ladinaticella
  - †Ladinaticella striatocostata
- †Lanceolites
  - †Lanceolites bicarinatus
  - †Lanceolites compactus
- †Lasalichthys – type locality for genus
  - †Lasalichthys hillsi – type locality for species
- †Latochara
  - †Latochara latitruncata
- †Laubopsis – tentative report
- †Legumen
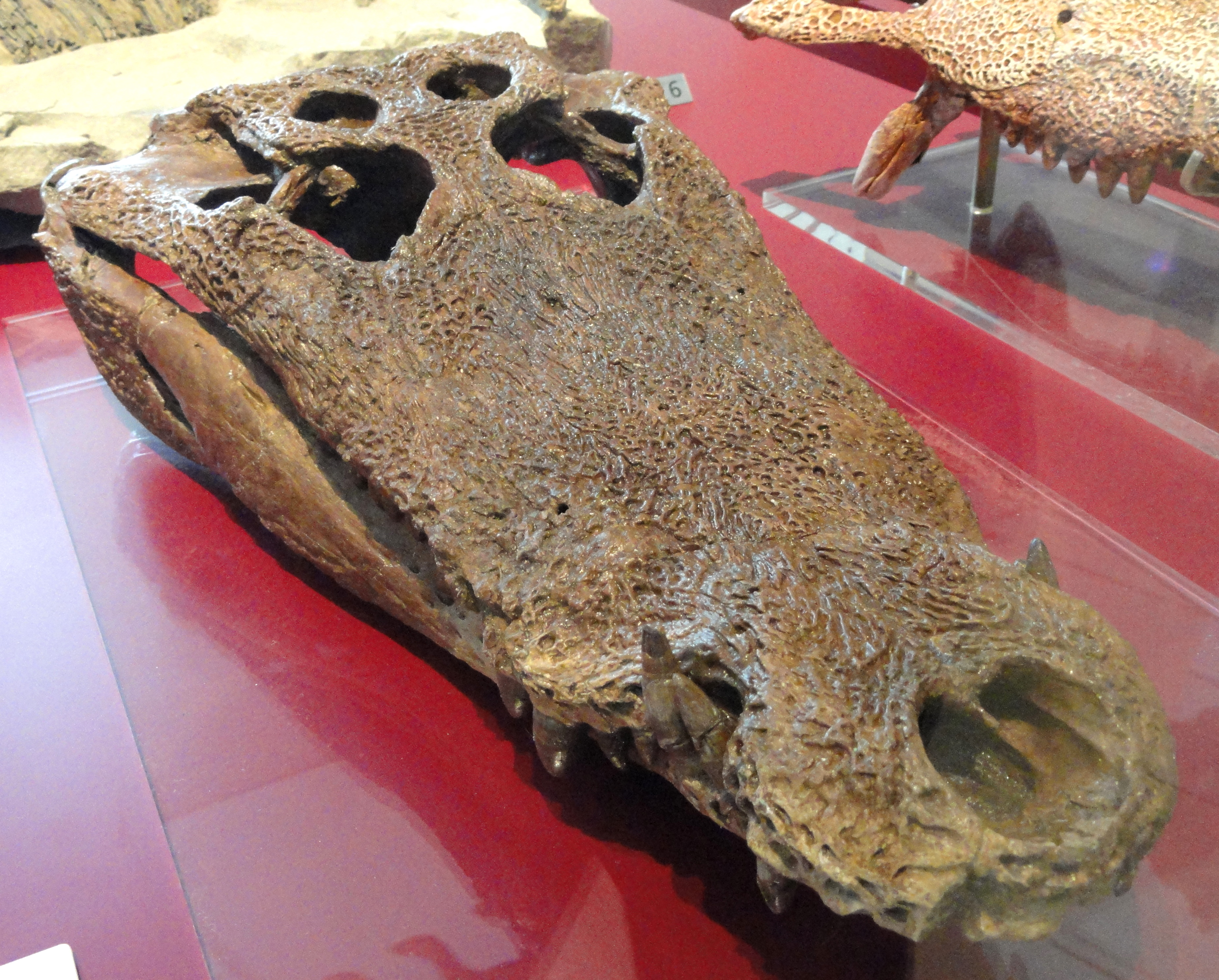
- Fossilized skull of the Late Cretaceous alligator relative Leidyosuchus
  †Leidyosuchus
- †Lenticidaris – type locality for genus
  - †Lenticidaris utahensis – type locality for species
- †Lepidotes
  - †Lepidotes walcotti – type locality for species
- Lepisosteus
- †Leptalestes
- †Leptochamops
  - †Leptochamops denticulatus
- †Leptochondria
  - †Leptochondria curtocardinalis
  - †Leptochondria nuetzeli – type locality for species
  - †Leptochondria occidanea – type locality for species
  - †Leptochondria xijinwulanensis
- Lima
- †Lingularia
  - †Lingularia borealis
- †Liopistha
  - †Liopistha meeki
- †Liostrea
  - †Liostrea strigilecula
- †Liriophyllum
  - †Liriophyllum UD012 – informal
- †Lissodus
- †Litakis
  - †Litakis gilmorei
- †Lonchidion
- Lopha
  - †Lopha engelmanni – or unidentified related form
- Lucina
- †Lyosoma
  - †Lyosoma enoda
  - †Lyosoma powelli
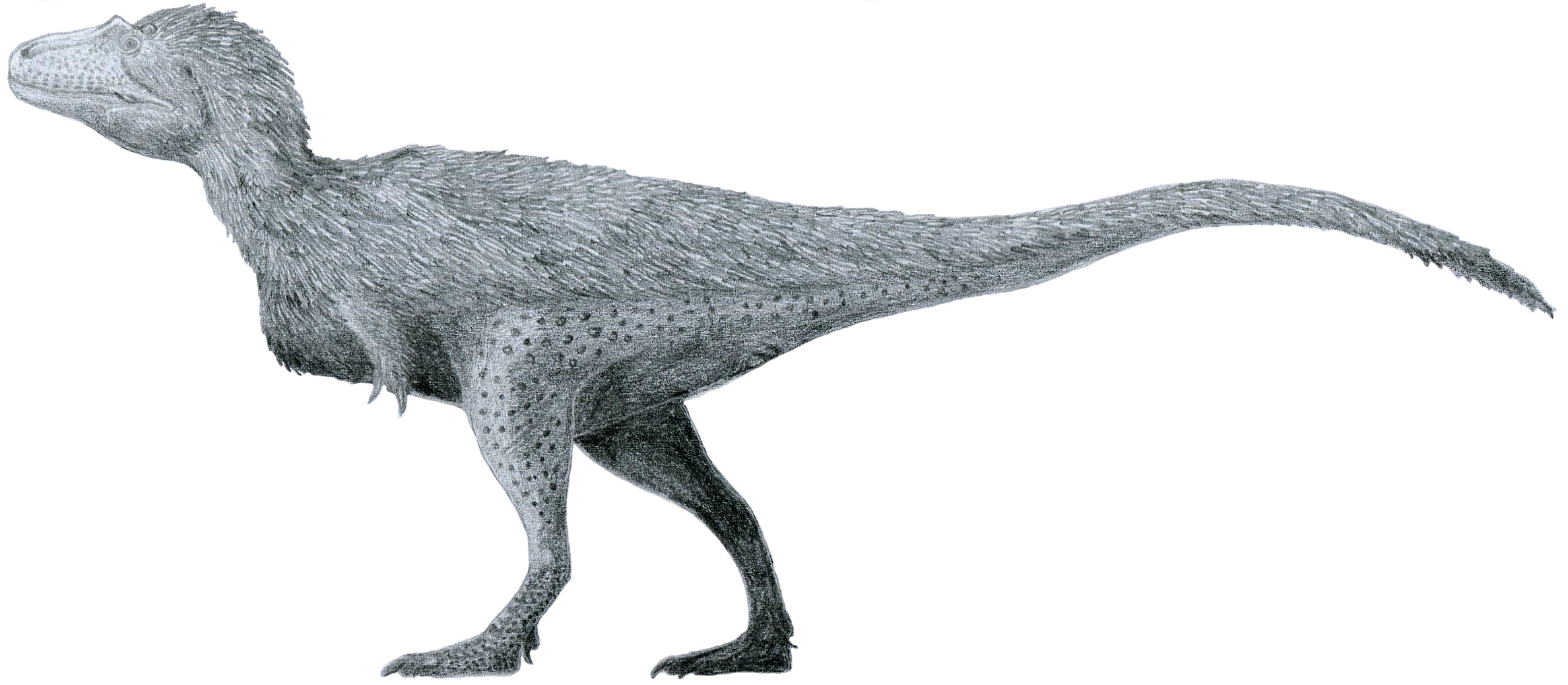
- Life restoration of the Late Cretaceous tyrannosaur Lythronax
  †Lythronax – type locality for genus
  - †Lythronax argestes – type locality for species

== M ==
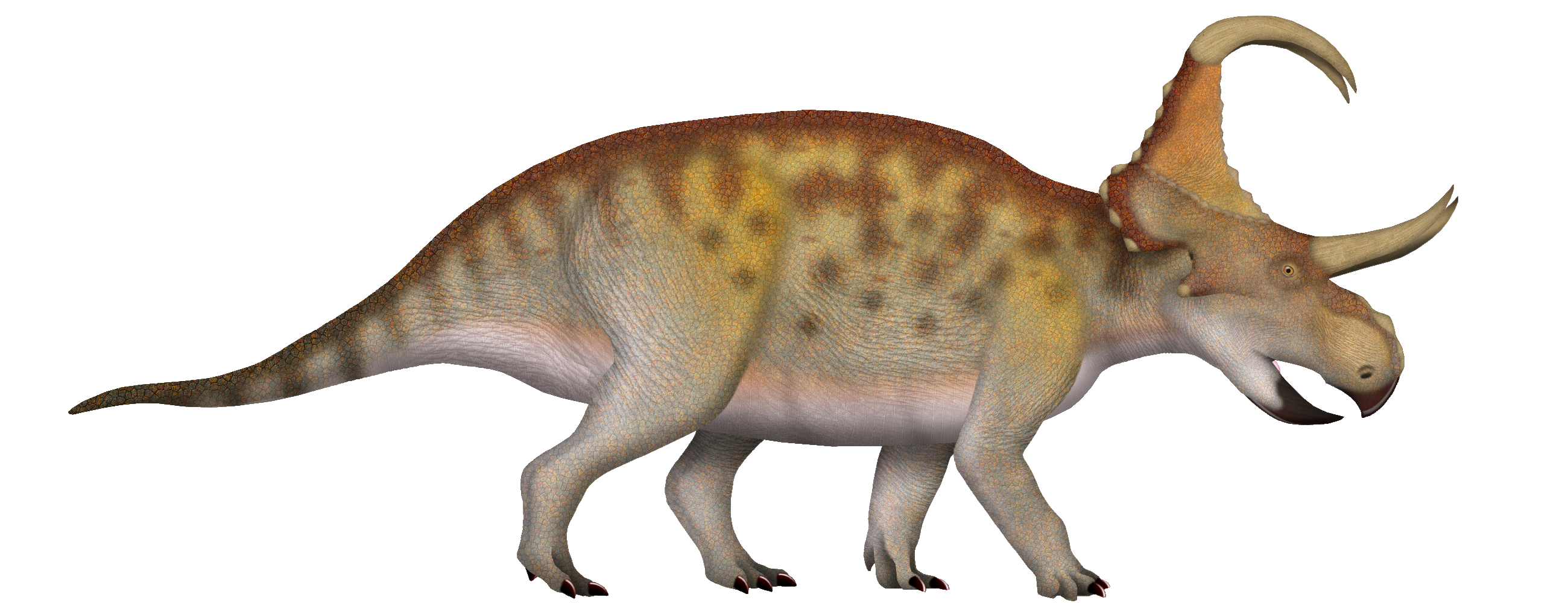
- Life restoration of the Late Cretaceous horned dinosaur Machairoceratops
  †Machairoceratops – type locality for genus
  - †Machairoceratops cronusi – type locality for species
- †Macroelongatoolithus
  - †Macroelongatoolithus carlylei – type locality for species
- †Mactromya – tentative report
- †Magadiceramus
  - †Magadiceramus crenelatus
  - †Magadiceramus crenistriatus
  - †Magadiceramus soukupi
- Magnolia
  - †Magnolia boulayana
- †Mammites
  - †Mammites nodosoides
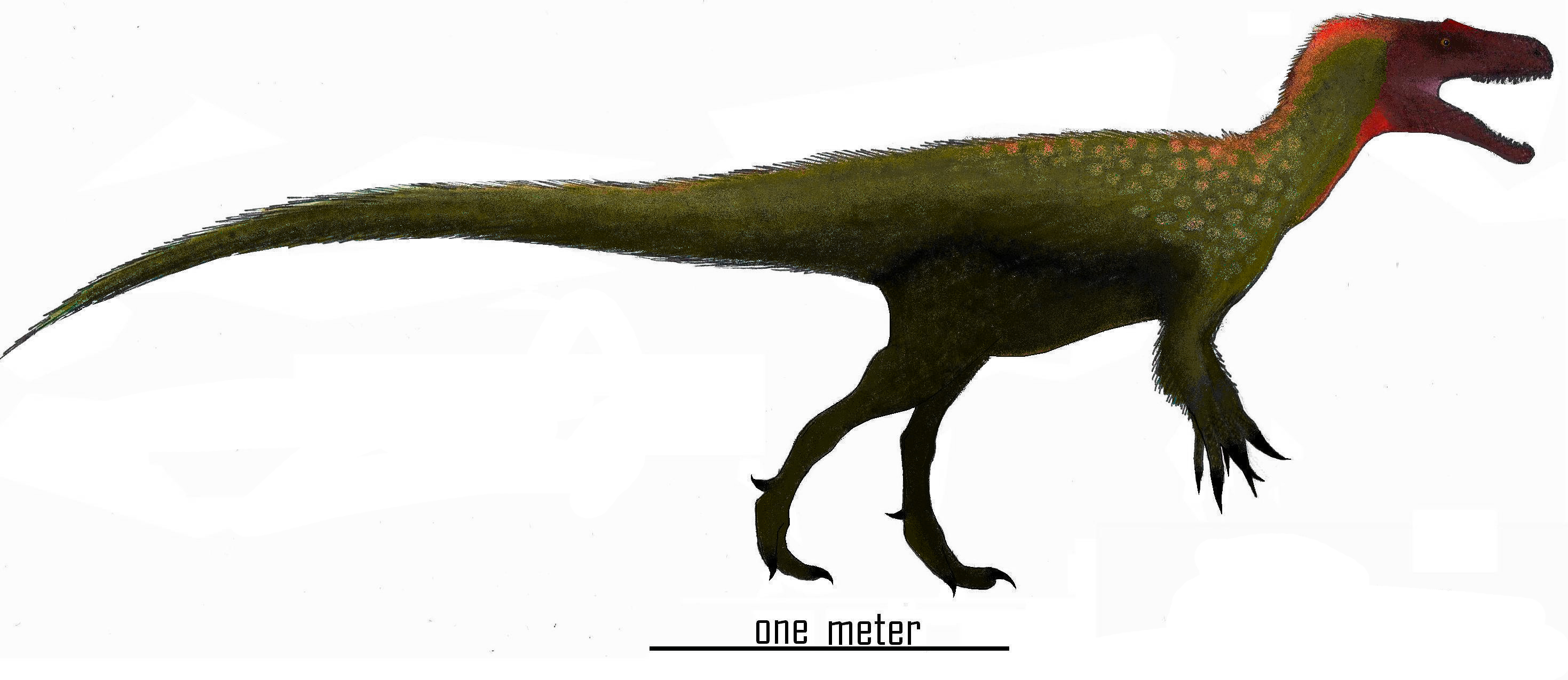
- Life restoration of the Late Jurassic megalosaur Marshosaurus
  †Marshosaurus – type locality for genus
  - †Marshosaurus bicentesimus – type locality for species
- †Martharaptor – type locality for genus
  - †Martharaptor greenriverensis – type locality for species
- †Matonidium
  - †Matonidium brownii
  - †Matonidium lancipinnulum
- †Meekoceras
  - †Meekoceras davisi
  - †Meekoceras gracilitatis
  - †Meekoceras millardense – type locality for species
  - †Meekoceras olivieri – type locality for species
- †Megalosauripus
- †Megasphaeroceras
  - †Megasphaeroceras rotundum – or unidentified comparable form
- †Melvius
  - †Melvius chauliodous – or unidentified comparable form
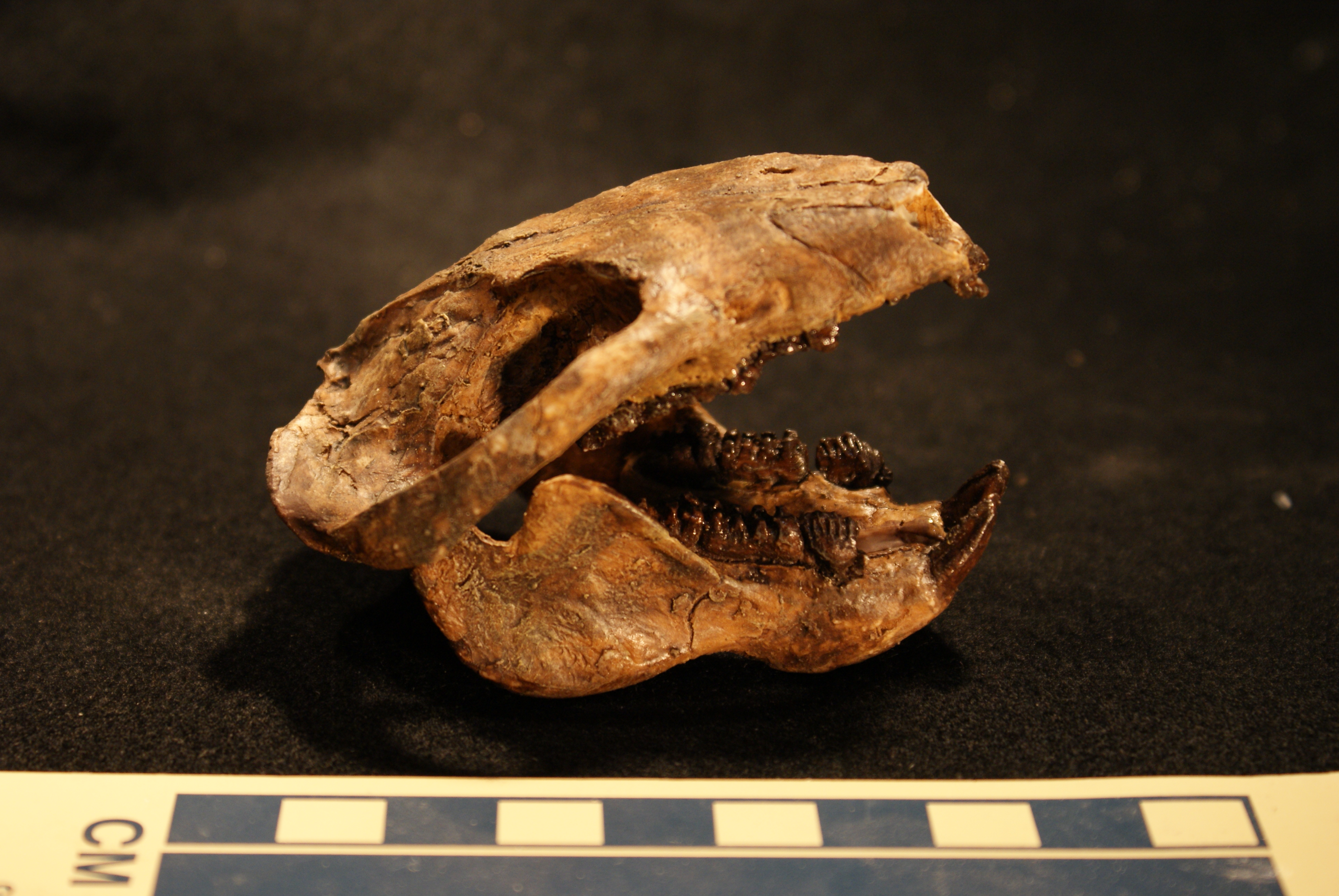
- Fossilized skull of the Late Cretaceous multituberculate mammal Meniscoessus
  †Meniscoessus
  - †Meniscoessus intermedius
- †Meniscognathus
  - †Meniscognathus altmani – or unidentified comparable form
  - †Meniscognathus molybrochoros – type locality for species
- †Mesembrioxylon
  - †Mesembrioxylon stokesi
  - †Mesembrioxylon stokesii
- †Mesembryoxylon
- †Mesodma
  - †Mesodma formosa – or unidentified comparable form
  - †Mesodma hensleighi – or unidentified comparable form
  - †Mesodma minor – or unidentified comparable form
  - †Mesodma thompsoni – or unidentified comparable form
- †Mesostoma
- †Metoicoceras
  - †Metoicoceras geslinianum
- †Microcachrydites
- †Microconchus
  - †Microconchus utahensis
- †Microeciella
  - †Microeciella duoflavina
  - †Microeciella pollostos – type locality for species
- †Minersvillites – type locality for genus
  - †Minersvillites farai – type locality for species
- †Miocidaris
  - †Miocidaris utahensis
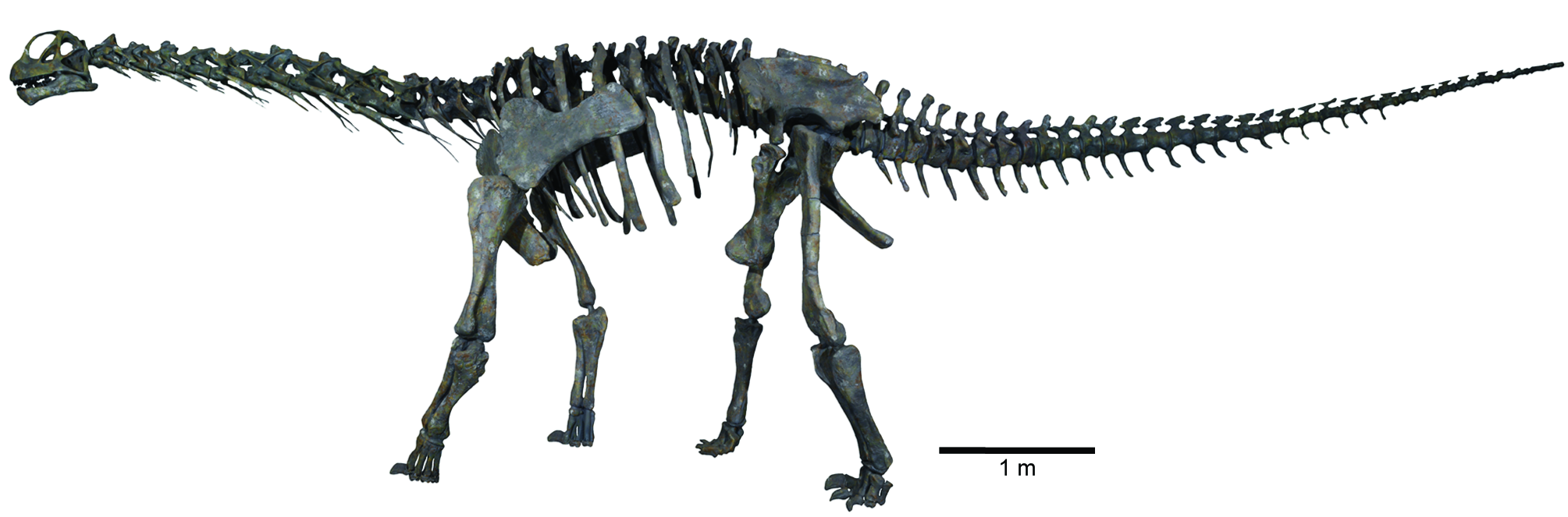
- Mounted fossilized skeletons of the Early Cretaceous long-necked dinosaur Moabosaurus
  †Moabosaurus – type locality for genus
  - †Moabosaurus utahensis – type locality for species
- Modiolus
  - †Modiolus isonemus
  - †Modiolus subimbricatus
- †Monanthesia
- †Monocnemodon – type locality for genus
  - †Monocnemodon syphakos – type locality for species
- †Moros – type locality for genus
  - †Moros intrepidus – type locality for species
- †Myalina
- †Myledaphus
  - †Myledaphus bipartitus
- †Myoconcha
  - †Myoconcha plana – or unidentified comparable form
- †Myopholas
  - †Myopholas hardyi
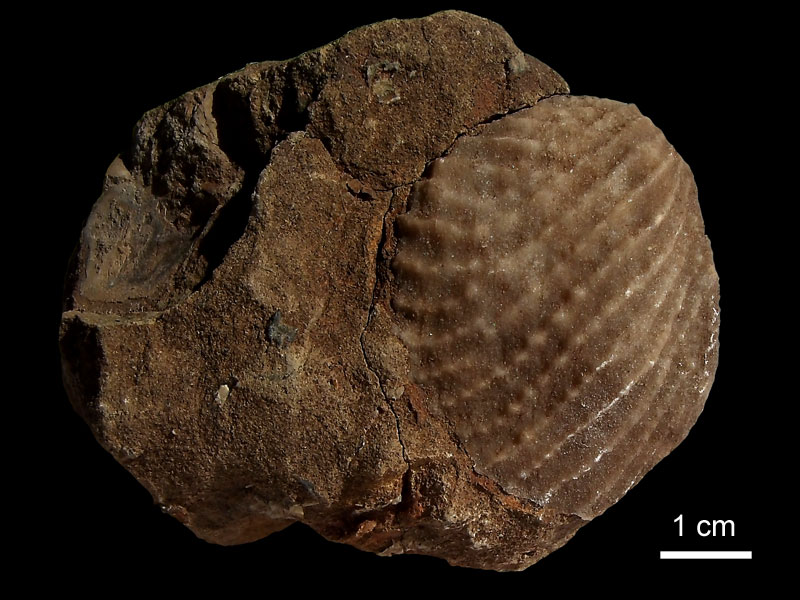
- Fossilized shell of the Jurassic-Cretaceous marine bivalve Myophorella
  †Myophorella
  - †Myophorella livinigstonensis
  - †Myophorella monatanaensis
  - †Myophorella yellowstonensis
- †Myophoria
- †Mytiloides
  - †Mytiloides submytiloides – or unidentified related form
- †Mytilus
  - †Mytilus whitei – or unidentified comparable form

== N ==
- †Naomichelys
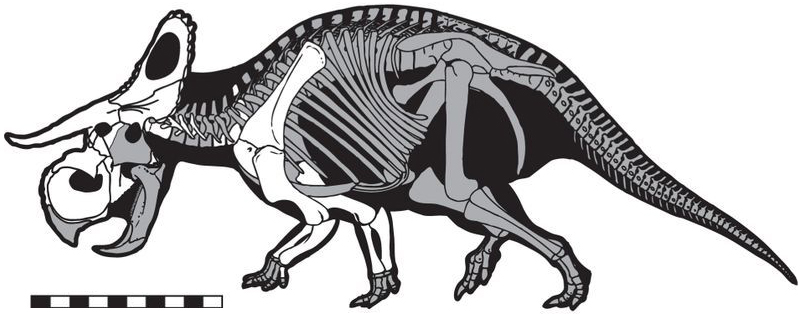
- Known material diagram of the Late Cretaceous horned dinosaur Nasutoceratops
  †Nasutoceratops – type locality for genus
  - †Nasutoceratops titusi – type locality for species
- †Naticopsis
  - †Naticopsis depressispira
  - †Naticopsis fenestravella – type locality for species
  - †Naticopsis utahensis – type locality for species
- †Natiria
  - †Natiria aequicostata – type locality for species
  - †Natiria costata – or unidentified comparable form
- †Nedcolbertia – type locality for genus
  - †Nedcolbertia justinhoffmanni – type locality for species
- †Nemodon
- †Neocardioceras
  - †Neocardioceras juddii
- †Neocrioceras
- †Neoschizodus
  - †Neoschizodus laevigatus
  - †Neoschizodus orbicularis – or unidentified comparable form
  - †Neoschizodus praeorbicularis
  - †Neoschizodus thaynesianus – type locality for species
- †Neridomus – tentative report
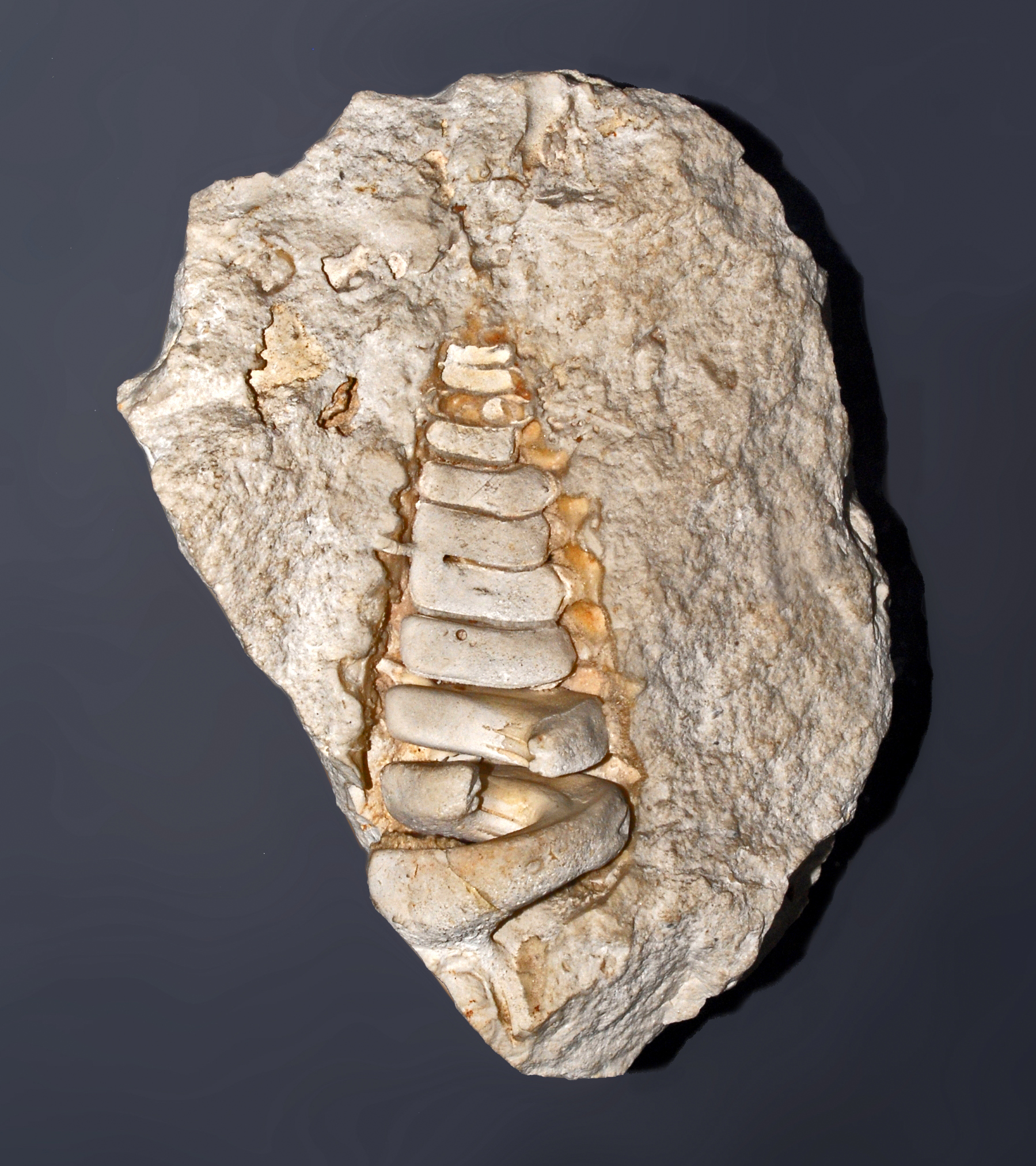
- Fossilized shell of the Jurassic-Cretaceous sea snail Nerinea
  †Nerinea – tentative report
- †Neritaria
  - †Neritaria costata – type locality for species
- Neritina
  - †Neritina phaseolaris
- †Neurankylus
- †Nezpercius
  - †Nezpercius dodsoni
- †Nilsonia
  - †Nilsonia lewisii – type locality for species
- †Nilssoniopteris
- †Nododelphinula – tentative report
- †Normannites – tentative report
  - †Normannites crickmayi – or unidentified related form
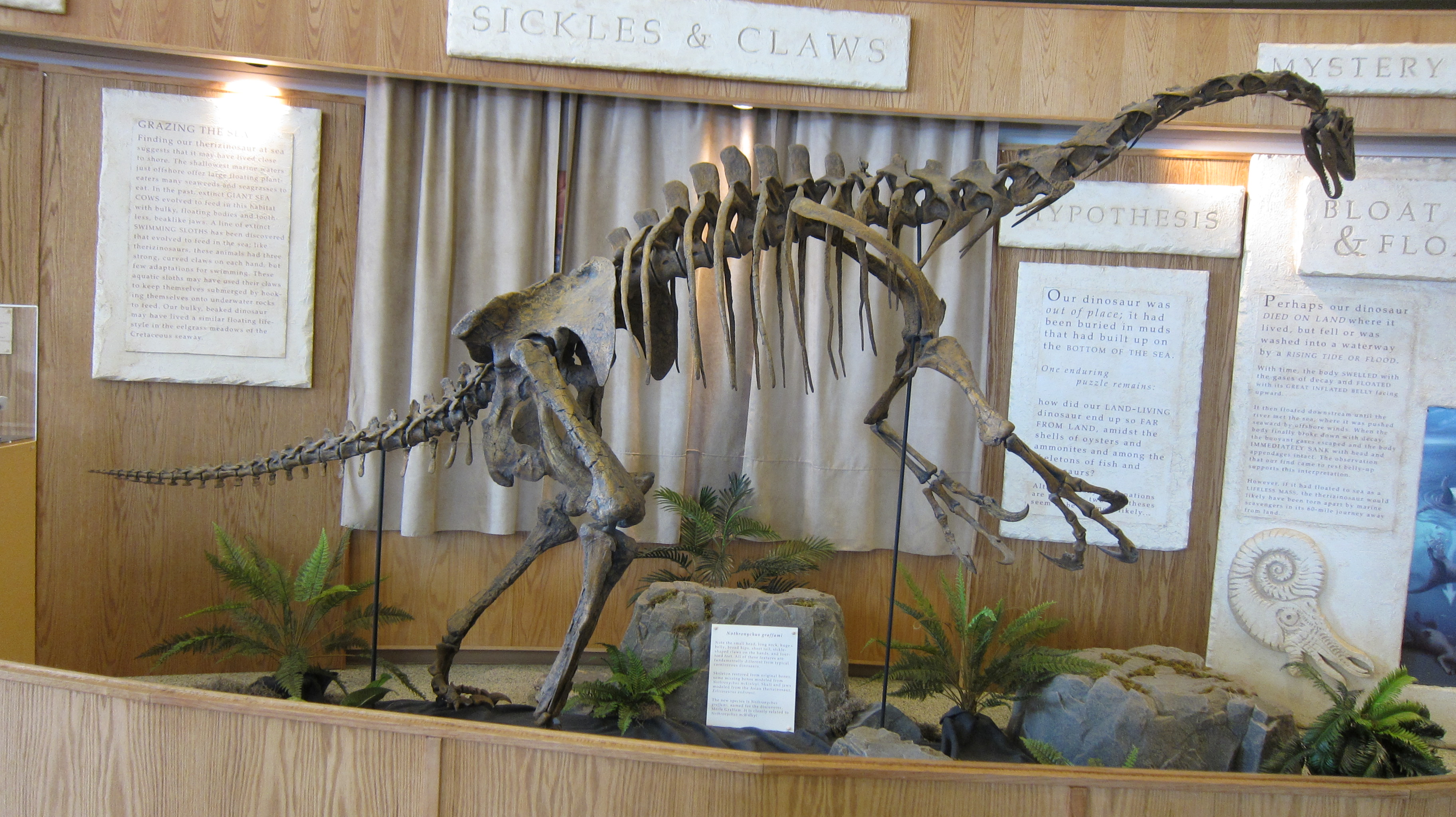
- Mounted fossilized skeleton of the Late Cretaceous Nothronychus
  †Nothronychus
  - †Nothronychus graffami – type locality for species
- Nucula
- Nuculana
  - †Nuculana mutuata – or unidentified comparable form
- †Nymphalucina
  - †Nymphalucina linearia – or unidentified related form

== O ==
- †Obnixia – type locality for genus
  - †Obnixia thaynesiana
- †Odaxosaurus
  - †Odaxosaurus piger – or unidentified comparable form
  - †Odaxosaurus priscus
  - †Odaxosaurus roosevelti – type locality for species
- †Omphaloptycha
  - †Omphaloptycha hormolira – type locality for species
- †Omphaloptychia
  - †Omphaloptychia laevisphaera – type locality for species
- Oncousoecia – tentative report
- †Ooliticia – tentative report
- †Ophioglypha
  - †Ophioglypha utahensis – type locality for species
- †Opisthias
- †Ornithomimus
- †Osteocallis
  - †Osteocallis mandibulus
- Ostrea
  - †Ostrea occidentalis
  - †Ostrea strigulecula
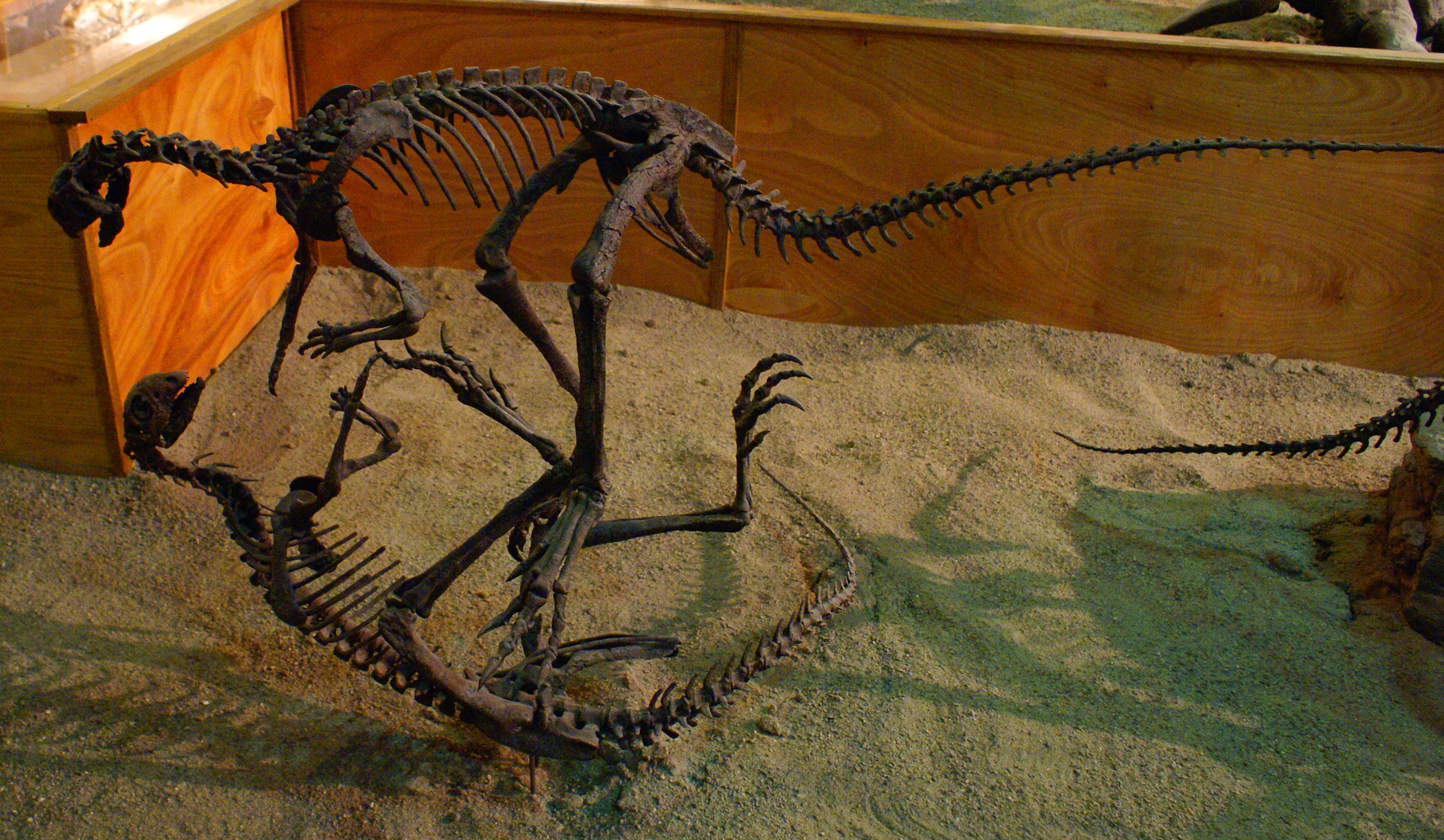
- Mounted fossilized skeleton of the Late Jurassic herbivorous dinosaur Othnielosaurus
  †Othnielosaurus
  - †Othnielosaurus consors
- †Otozoum
- †Ovaloolithus
  - †Ovaloolithus tenuisus – type locality for species
  - †Ovaloolithus utahensis – type locality for species
- †Owenites
  - †Owenites carpenteri
  - †Owenites koeneni

== P ==
- †Pachyomphalus
  - †Pachyomphalus americanus – type locality for species
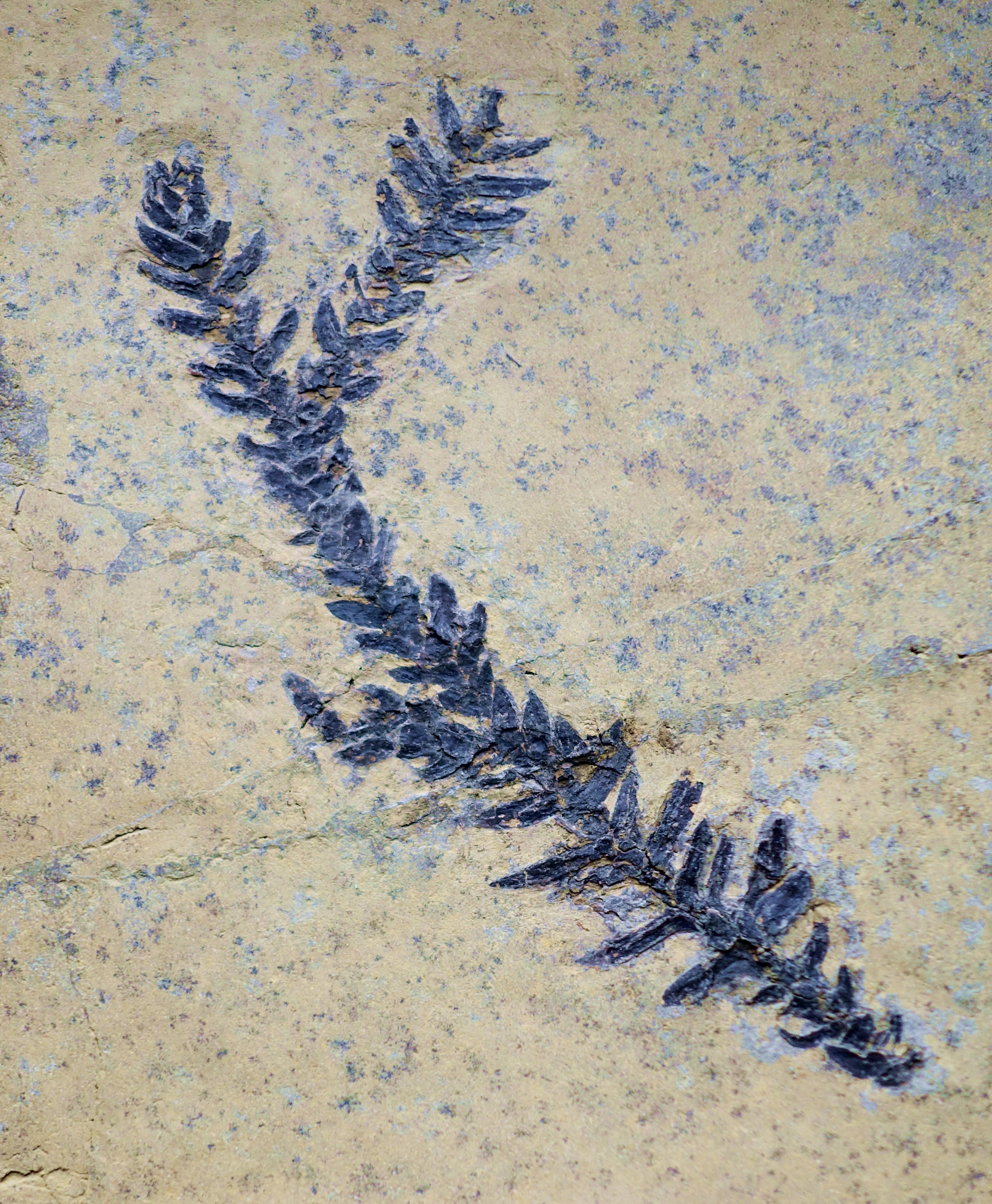
- Fossilized foliage of the Carboniferous-Late Cretaceous plant Pagiophyllum
  †Pagiophyllum
- †Paiutemys – type locality for genus
  - †Paiutemys tibert – type locality for species
- †Palaeophycus – or unidentified comparable form
- †Palaeopiceoxylon
  - †Palaeopiceoxylon thinosu
  - †Palaeopiceoxylon thinosus
- †Palaeoscincosaurus
  - †Palaeoscincosaurus pharkidodon – type locality for species
- †Paleoaster
  - †Paleoaster inquirenda
- †Palmulasaurus – type locality for genus
  - †Palmulasaurus quadratus – type locality for species
- †Parachondroceras
  - †Parachondroceras andrewsi
  - †Parachondroceras filicostatum – or unidentified comparable form
- †Paracimexomys
  - †Paracimexomys judithae – or unidentified comparable form
  - †Paracimexomys magnus
  - †Paracimexomys perplexus – type locality for species
  - †Paracimexomys priscus – or unidentified comparable form
  - †Paracimexomys robisoni – type locality for species
- †Paraglyphanodon – type locality for genus
  - †Paraglyphanodon gazini – type locality for species
  - †Paraglyphanodon utahensis – type locality for species
- †Parallelodon – tentative report
  - †Parallelodon beyrichii – or unidentified related form
- †Paramacellodus
  - †Paramacellodus oweni – or unidentified comparable form
- †Paranyctoides
- †Paraphyllanthoxylon
  - †Paraphyllanthoxylon utahense
- †Parasaniwa
  - †Parasaniwa cynochoros – type locality for species
  - †Parasaniwa wyomingensis – or unidentified comparable form
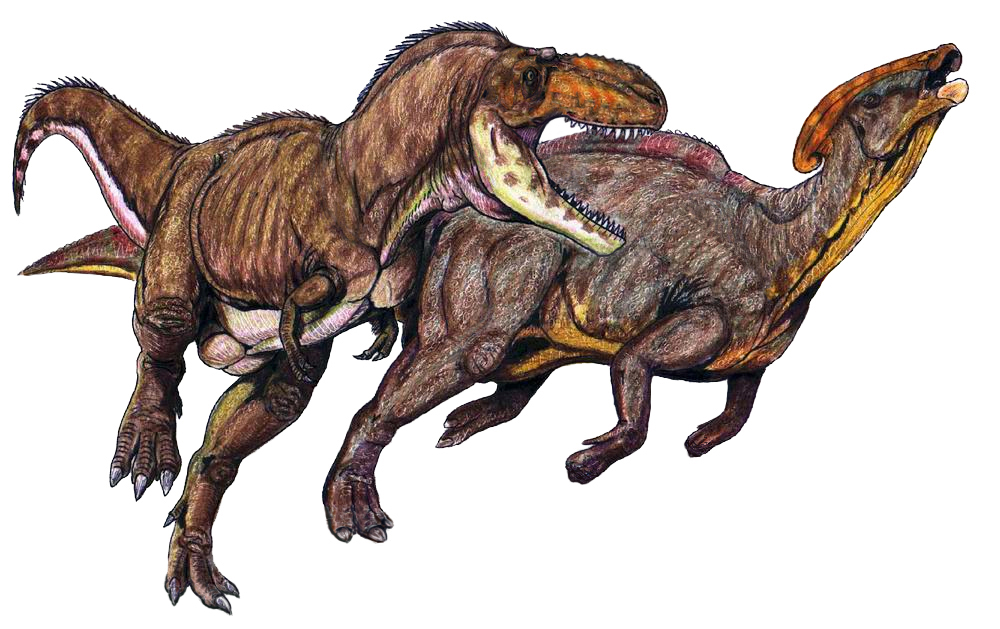
- Life restoration of the Late Cretaceous duck-billed dinosaur Parasaurolophus being preyed upon by the tyrannosaur Teratophoneus
  †Parasaurolophus
  - †Parasaurolophus cyrtocristatus
- †Pariadens
  - †Pariadens kirklandi – type locality for species
  - †Pariadens mckennai – type locality for species
- †Parmicorbula
- †Paronychodon – or unidentified comparable form
- †Parotosuchus
  - †Parotosuchus nov. spec. – informal
- †Parussuria
  - †Parussuria compressa
- †Patulopora
  - †Patulopora cutleri
- †Paullia
- †Pediomys – report made of unidentified related form or using admittedly obsolete nomenclature
- †Pegmavalvula
  - †Pegmavalvula triassica
- †Pelecypodichnus
- †Peloroplites – type locality for genus
  - †Peloroplites cedrimontanus – type locality for species
- †Peneteius – type locality for genus
  - †Peneteius saueri – type locality for species
- †Pentasauropus
- †Periallus
  - †Periallus woodsidensis
- †Perissoptera
- †Permophorus
  - †Permophorus bregeri – or unidentified comparable form
  - †Permophorus triassicus
- †Pernopecten
- †Phelopteria
  - †Phelopteria minuta – or unidentified comparable form
- †Phlebopteris
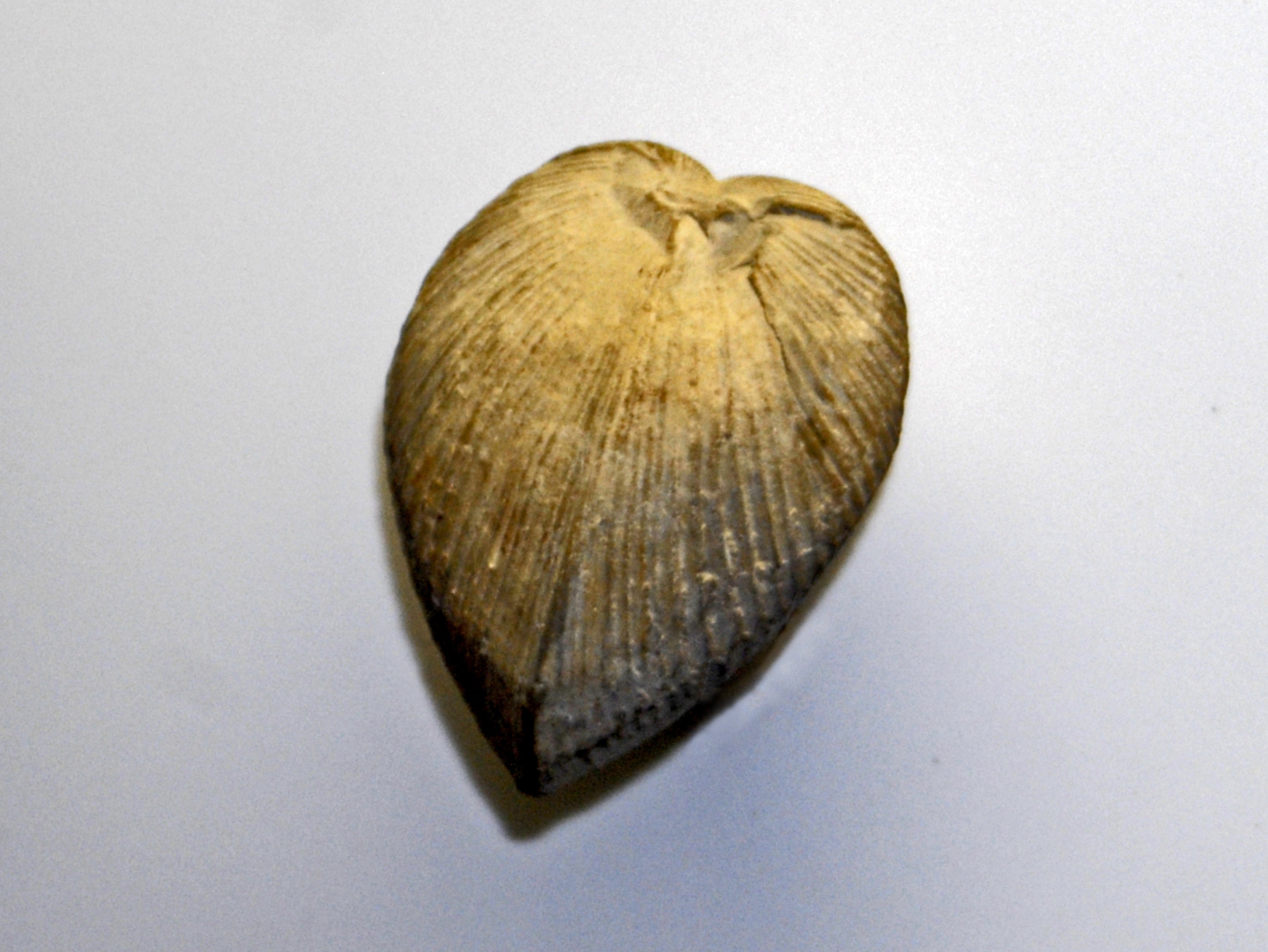
- Fossilized shell of the Early Triassic-Pliocene marine bivalve Pholadomya
  Pholadomya
  - †Pholadomya inaequiplicata
  - †Pholadomya kingi
- †Piarorhynchella
  - †Piarorhynchella triassica
  - †Piarorhynchella triassicus
- †Picopsis
- †Pinacosuchus – type locality for genus
  - †Pinacosuchus mantiensis – type locality for species
- Pinna
  - †Pinna kingi
- †Pistia – report made of unidentified related form or using admittedly obsolete nomenclature
  - †Pistia corrugata
- †Pityoxylon
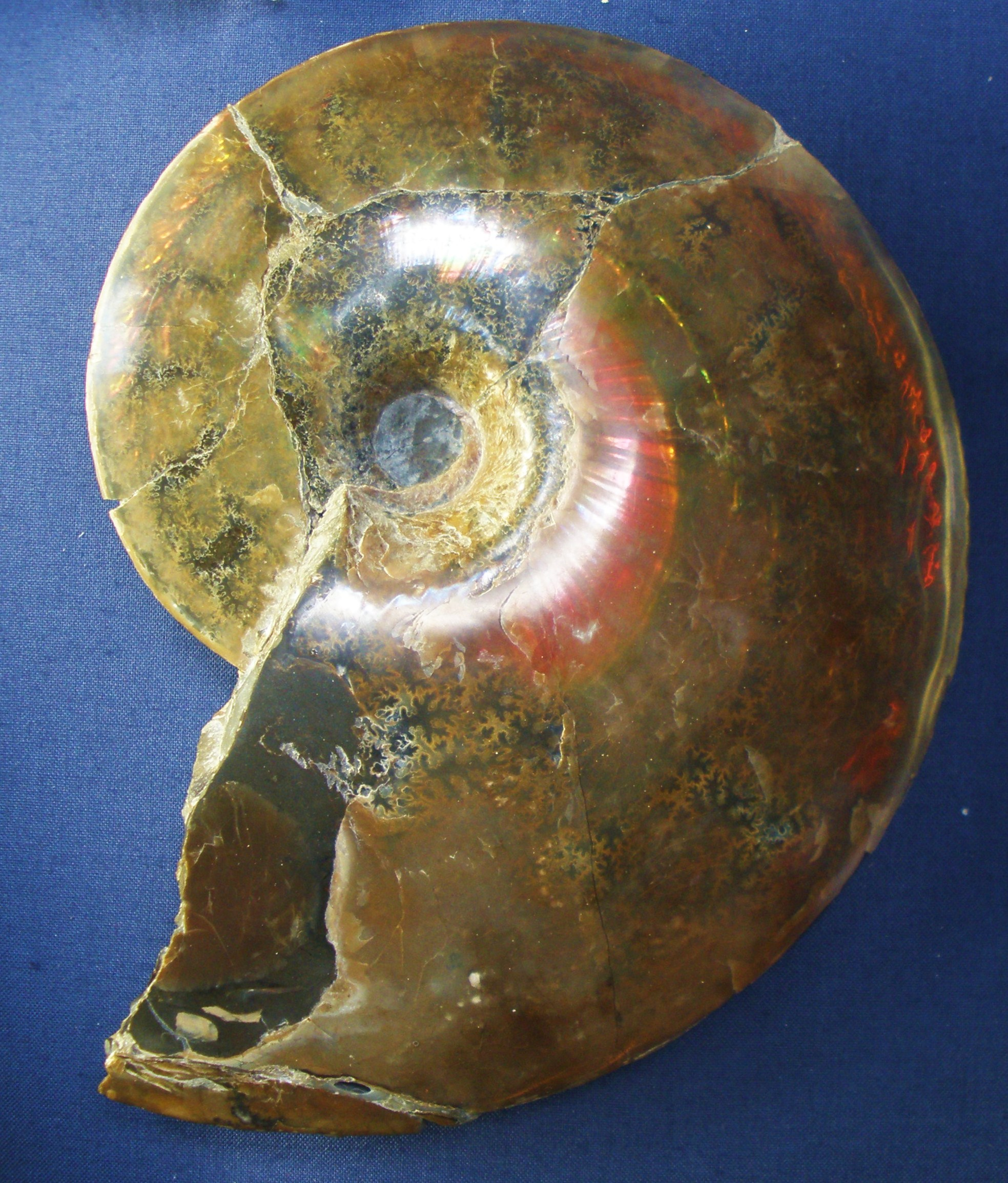
- Fossilized shell of the Late Cretaceous ammonoid cephalopod Placenticeras
  †Placenticeras
  - †Placenticeras cumminsi
- Placopsilina
- †Plagioglypta
- †Plagiostoma
  - †Plagiostoma occidentalis
  - †Plagiostoma ziona
- †Planicoxa – type locality for genus
  - †Planicoxa venenica – type locality for species
- †Planolites
- †Plataninium
- †Plesiopinna
- †Pleuromya
  - †Pleuromya musculoides – or unidentified comparable form
  - †Pleuromya prima – type locality for species
  - †Pleuromya subcompressa
- †Pleuronautilus
- †Pleuronectites
- Pleurotomaria – tentative report
- Plicatula
  - †Plicatula ferryi – or unidentified comparable form
- †Podozamites
- †Polyacrodus – tentative report
- †Polyglyphanodon – type locality for genus
  - †Polyglyphanodon sternbergi – type locality for species
- †Polygyrina
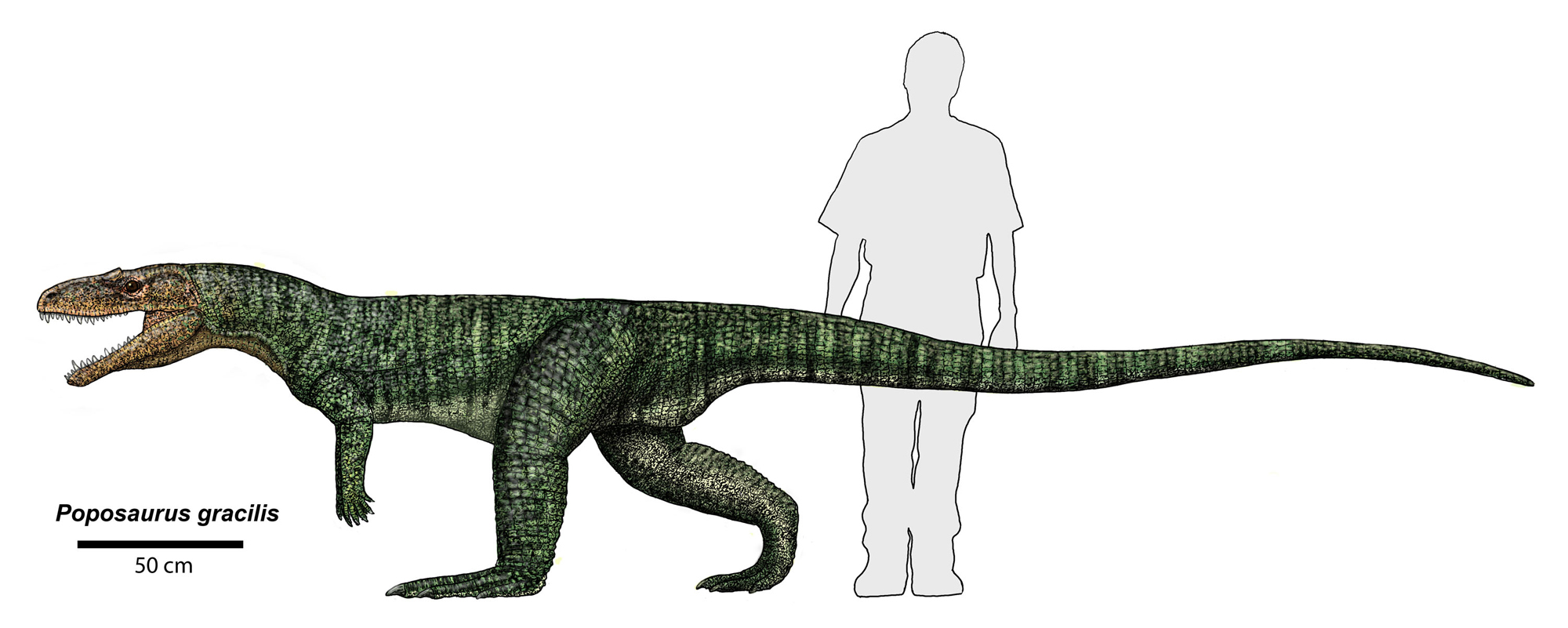
- Restoration of the Late Triassic crocodile relative Poposaurus with an anachronistic human to scale
  †Poposaurus
  - †Poposaurus gracilis
- †Preflorianites
  - †Preflorianites toulai
- †Preprismatoolithus
  - †Preprismatoolithus coloradensis
- †Priacodon
- †Primaderma – type locality for genus
  - †Primaderma nessovi – type locality for species
- †Prismatoolithus
  - †Prismatoolithus jenseni – type locality for species
- †Procerithium – tentative report
- †Promathildia
  - †Promathildia spirocostata – type locality for species
- †Promyalina
  - †Promyalina putiatinensis
  - †Promyalina spathi
- †Promysidiella
- †Pronoella
  - †Pronoella cinnabarensis – or unidentified comparable form
  - †Pronoella uintahensis
- †Proplacenticeras
  - †Proplacenticeras stantoni
- †Prorokia
  - †Prorokia fontenellensis
- †Protalphadon
- †Protocardia
- †Protogusarella
  - †Protogusarella smithi
- †Protolambda
  - †Protolambda hatcheri - North Horn Formation
- †Protopis
  - †Protopis waageni – or unidentified related form
- †Protovirgularia
- †Psalandon – tentative report
- †Pseudaspidoceras
- †Pseudocalycoceras
- †Pseudocorbula
- †Pseudohypolophus
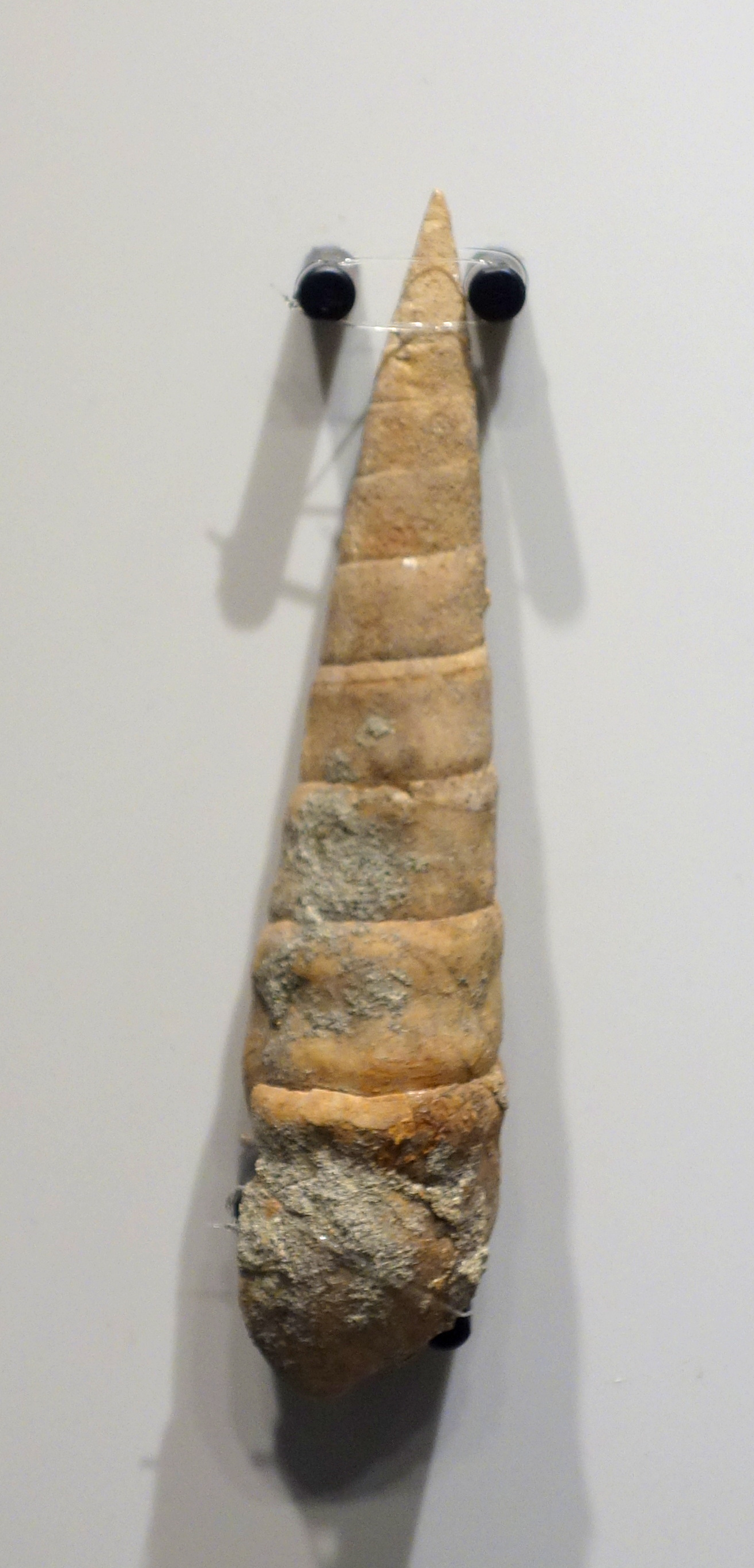
- Fossilized shell of a Pseudomelania sea snail
  †Pseudomelania
- †Pseudomyoconcha – tentative report
- †Pseudoptera
- †Pseudosageceras
  - †Pseudosageceras multilobatum
- †Pseudosaurillus – or unidentified comparable form
- †Pseudotetrasauropus
- †Pseudotritonium
  - †Pseudotritonium sciaphosterum – type locality for species
- †Psilomya
  - †Psilomya concentrica – or unidentified related form
  - †Psilomya elongata – or unidentified related form
- †Pteraichnus
  - †Pteraichnus saltwashensis – or unidentified comparable form
  - †Pteraichnus stokesi – or unidentified comparable form
- †Ptychotrigon
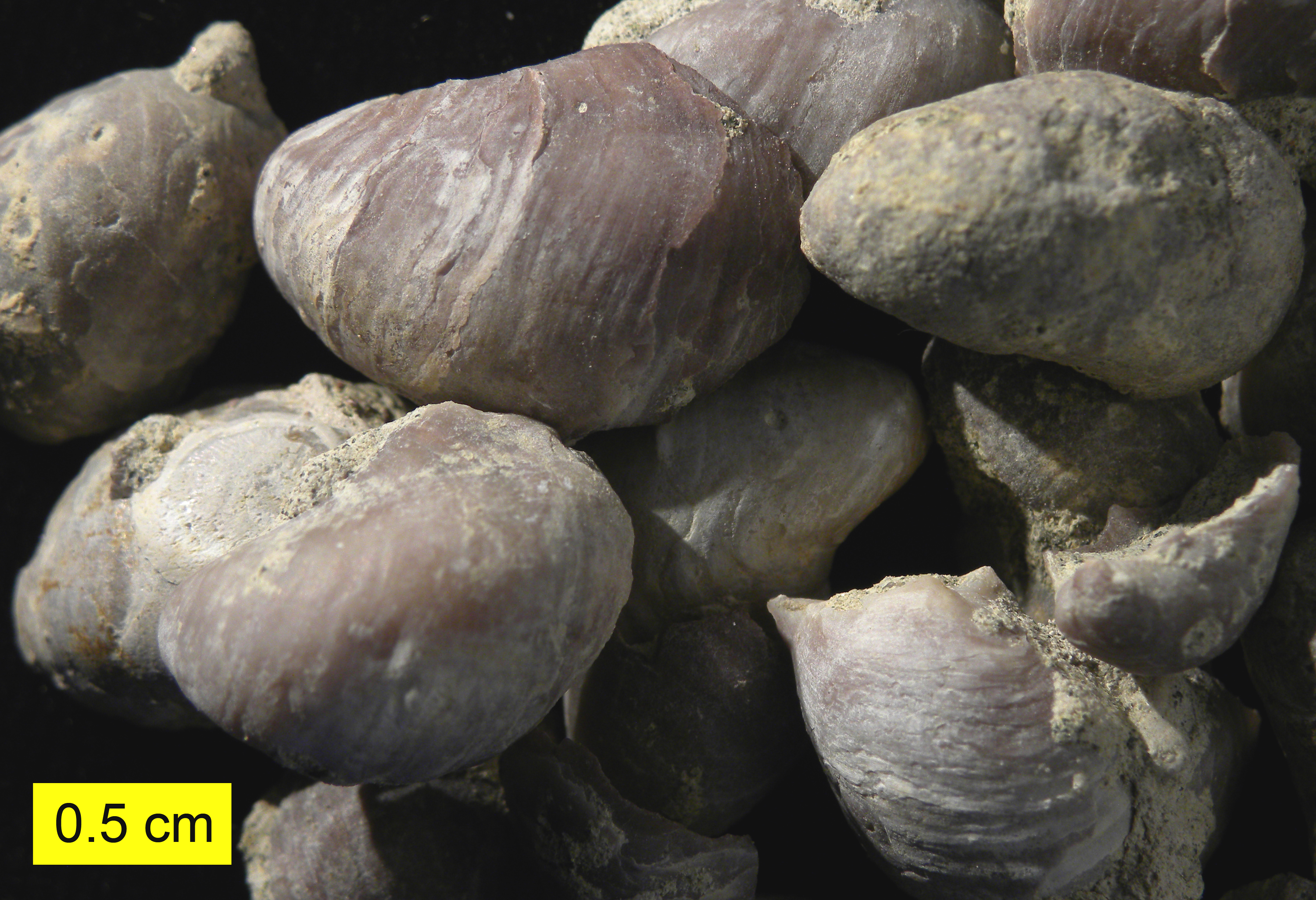
- Assemblage of fossilized shells of the Cretaceous-Pleistocene oyster Pycnodonte
  Pycnodonte
  - †Pycnodonte newberryi

== Q ==
- †Quenstedtia
  - †Quenstedtia bathonica – or unidentified related form

== R ==
- †Radioceras
  - †Radioceras evolvens – or unidentified related form
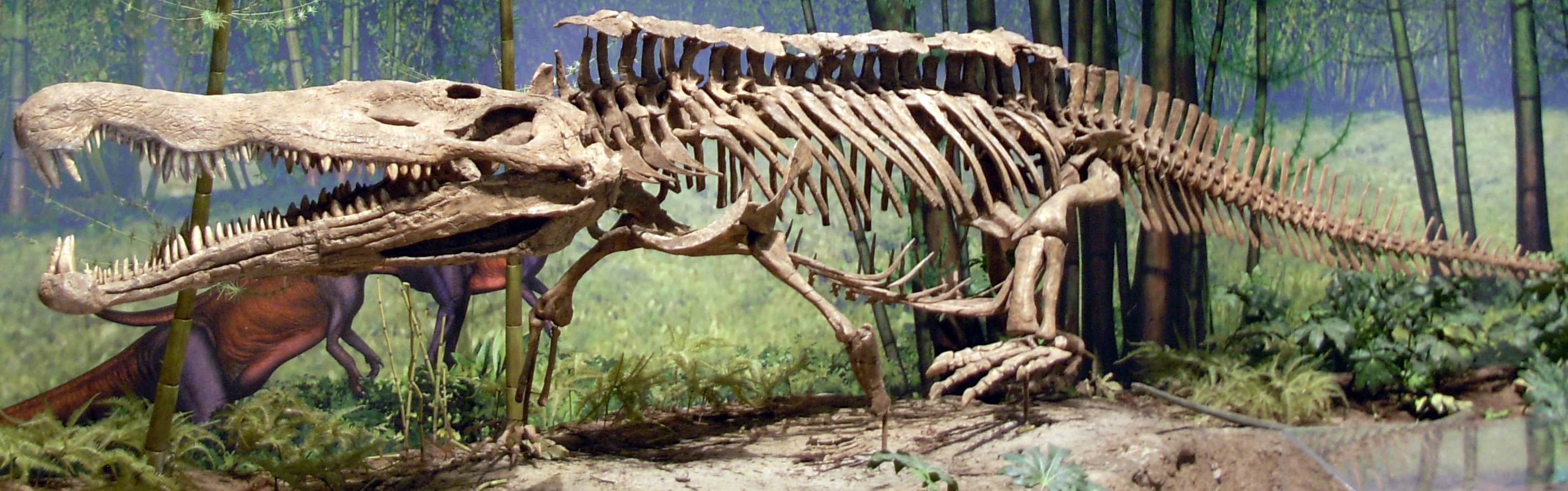
- Fossilized skeleton of the Late Triassic phytosaur Redondasaurus
  †Redondasaurus
  - †Redondasaurus gregorii
- Rhabdocolpus
  - †Rhabdocolpus viriosus
- †Rhadinosteus – type locality for genus
  - †Rhadinosteus parvus – type locality for species
- †Rhynchonella – report made of unidentified related form or using admittedly obsolete nomenclature
- †Rhynchosauroides
  - †Rhynchosauroides schochardti
- †Rhynchostreon
  - †Rhynchostreon levis
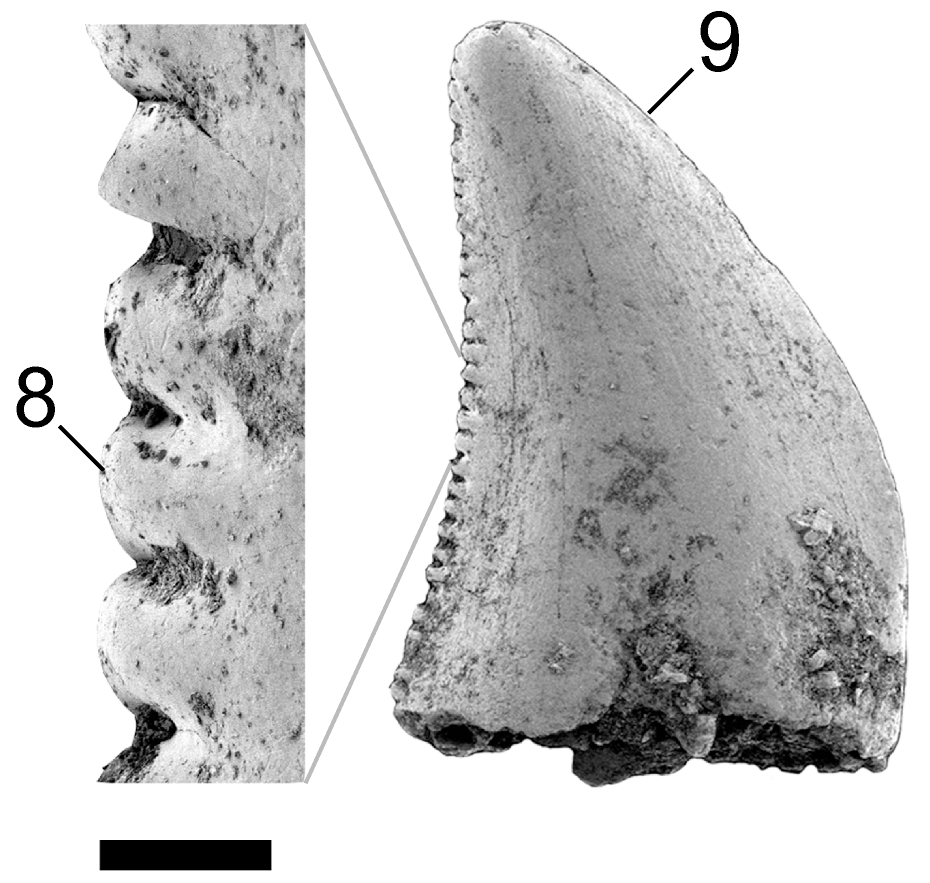
- Micrograph with magnified inset of a fossilized tooth of the Late Cretaceous theropod dinosaur Richardoestesia
  †Richardoestesia
  - †Richardoestesia isosceles – or unidentified comparable form
- Rogerella
- †Rotodactylus
  - †Rotodactylus cursorius – type locality for species

== S ==
- †Sabalites
  - †Sabalites NE008 – informal
- Salix
  - †Salix newberryana
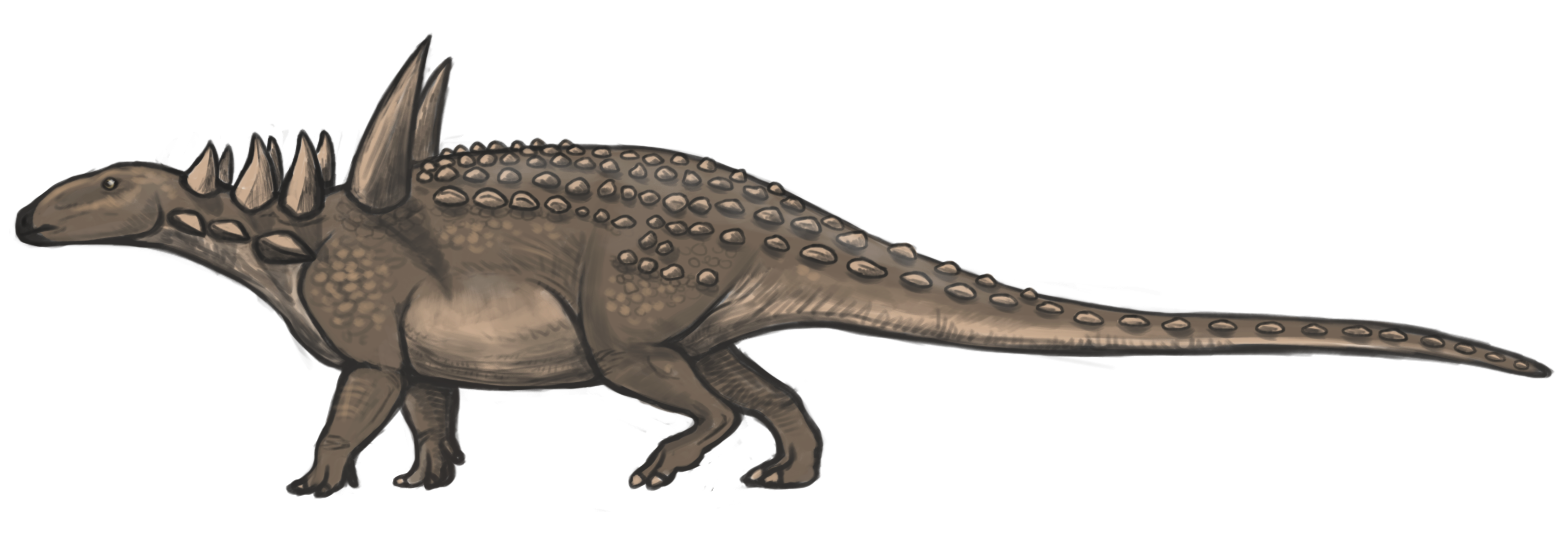
- Life restoration of the Early Cretaceous armored dinosaur Sauropelta
  †Sauropelta – or unidentified comparable form
- †Scalamagnus
  - †Scalamagnus tropicensis – type locality for species
- †Scapherpeton
- †Schillerosaurus – type locality for genus
  - †Schillerosaurus utahensis – type locality for species
- †Sciponoceras
  - †Sciponoceras gracile
- †Scotiophryne
  - †Scotiophryne pustulosa
- †Scoyenia
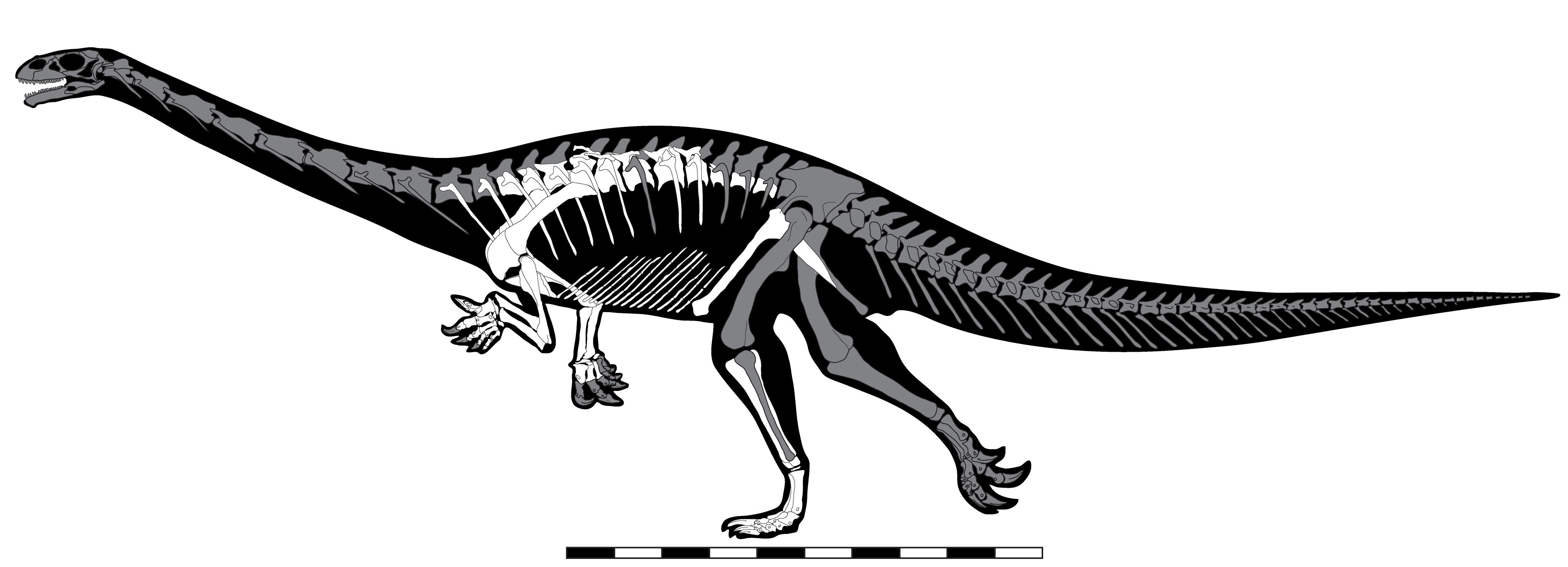
- Known material diagram of the Early Jurassic primitive long-necked dinosaur Seitaad
  †Seitaad – type locality for genus
  - †Seitaad ruessi – type locality for species
- †Sementiconcha – type locality for genus
  - †Sementiconcha recuperator – type locality for species
- †Semionotus
  - †Semionotus kanabensis – type locality for species
- Serpula
  - †Serpula intrica
  - †Serpula large
- †Sexta
  - †Sexta navicula – or unidentified related form
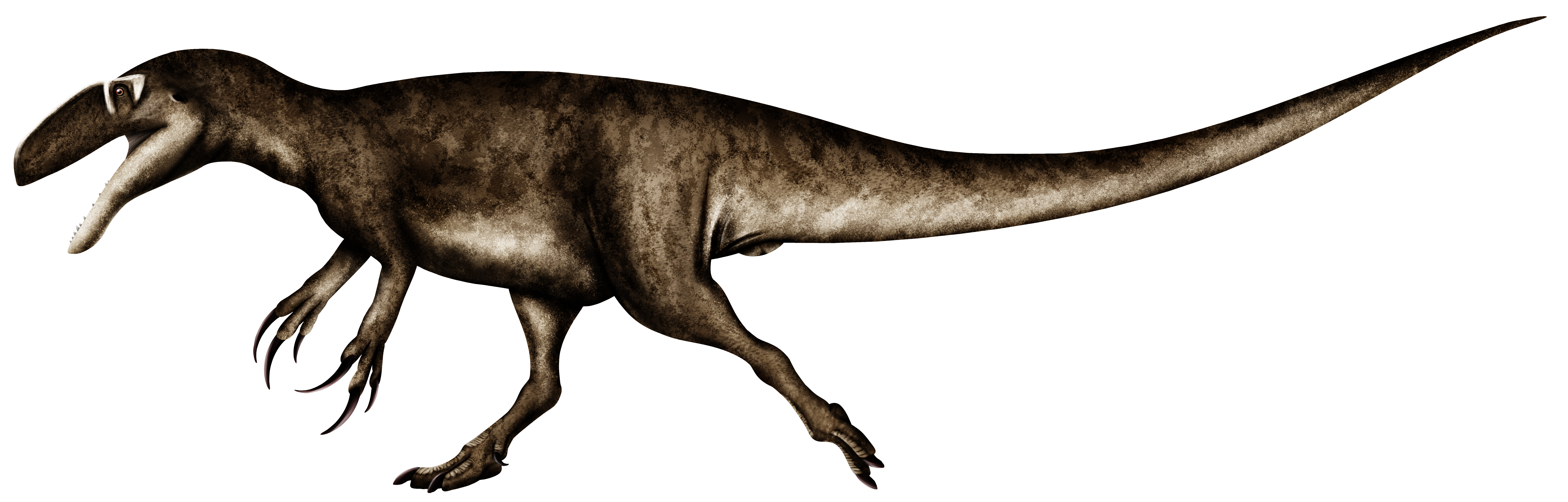
- Life restoration of the Late Cretaceous theropod dinosaur Siats
  †Siats – type locality for genus
  - †Siats meekerorum – type locality for species
- †Simplicidium
- †Sinbadelphys
  - †Sinbadelphys schmidti
- †Sinbadiella – type locality for genus
  - †Sinbadiella pygmaea – type locality for species
- †Skolithos
- †Sohlites
  - †Sohlites spinosus
- Solemya
  - †Solemya obscura
- †Soleniscus
- †Spalacolestes
  - †Spalacolestes cretulablatta
  - †Spalacolestes inconcinnus – type locality for species
- †Spalacotheridium – type locality for genus
  - †Spalacotheridium mckennai – type locality for species
  - †Spalacotheridium noblei
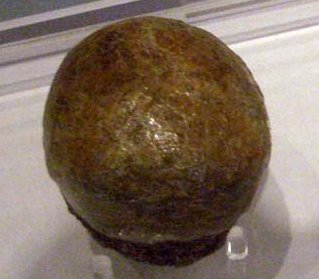
- Fossils of the dinosaur egg oogenus Spheroolithus
  †Spheroolithus
- †Spheruprismatoolithus – type locality for genus
  - †Spheruprismatoolithus condensis
  - †Spheruprismatoolithus condensus – type locality for species
- Spirorbis – report made of unidentified related form or using admittedly obsolete nomenclature
  - †Spirorbis valvata – or unidentified comparable form
- †Spongioolithus – type locality for genus
  - †Spongioolithus hirschi – type locality for species
- †Squatirhina
  - †Squatirhina americana
- †Stagonolepis
- †Stegopodus – type locality for genus
  - †Stegopodus czerkasi – type locality for species
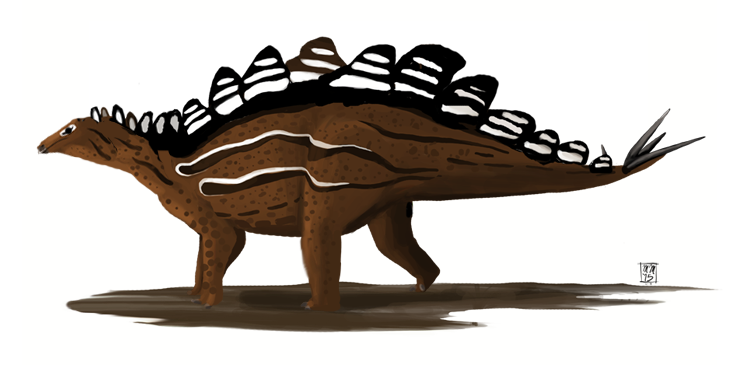
- Restoration of the Late Jurassic stegosaur Stegosaurus
  †Stegosaurus
  - †Stegosaurus stenops – or unidentified comparable form
  - †Stegosaurus ungulatus
- †Stellatochara
  - †Stellatochara obovata
- †Stemmatoceras
  - †Stemmatoceras albertense – or unidentified related form
  - †Stemmatoceras arcicostum
- †Stephanoceras
  - †Stephanoceras nodosum – or unidentified related form
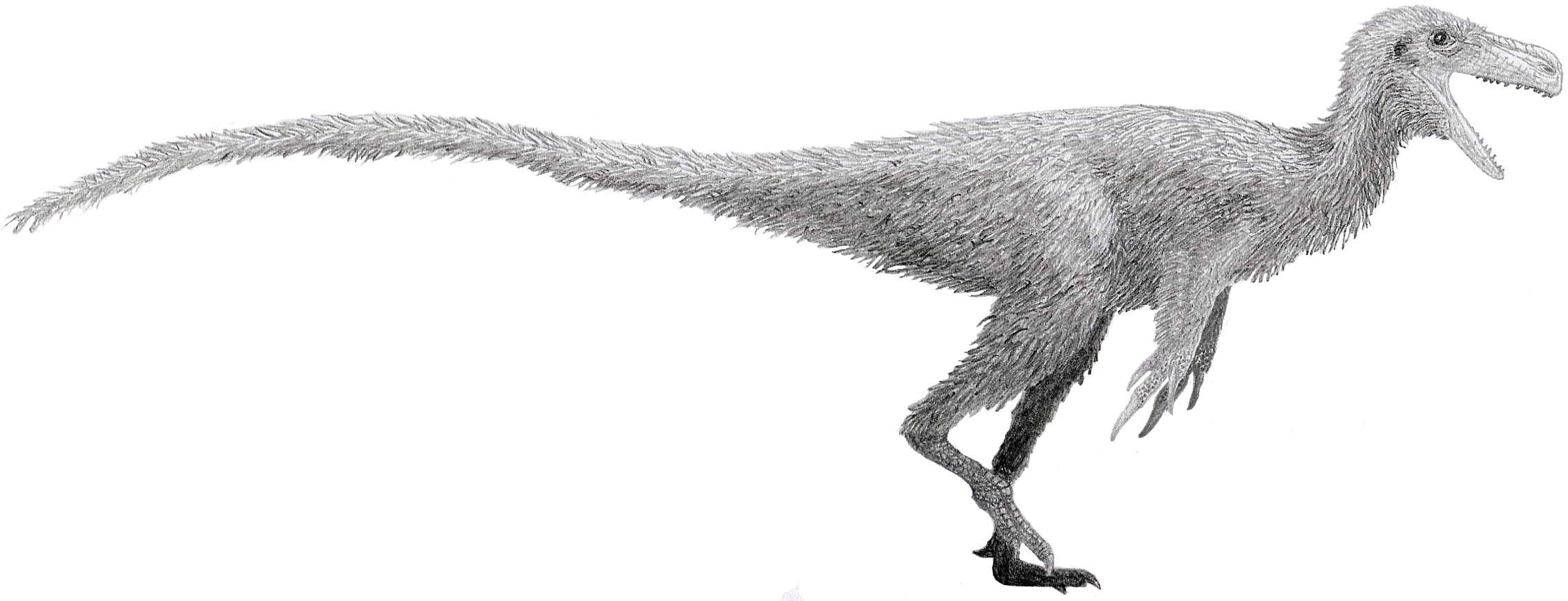
- Life restoration of the primitive tyrannosaur Stokesosaurus
  †Stokesosaurus – type locality for genus
  - †Stokesosaurus clevelandi – type locality for species
- Stomatopora
- †Stomohamites
- †Strobeus
  - †Strobeus batteni
- †Submeekoceras
  - †Submeekoceras mushbachanum
- †Symmetrocapulus – tentative report
  - †Symmetrocapulus corrugatus
- †Symmetrodontoides
  - †Symmetrodontoides foxi – type locality for species
  - †Symmetrodontoides oligodontos – type locality for species
- †Syncyclonema
- †Synorichthys
  - †Synorichthys stewarti

== T ==
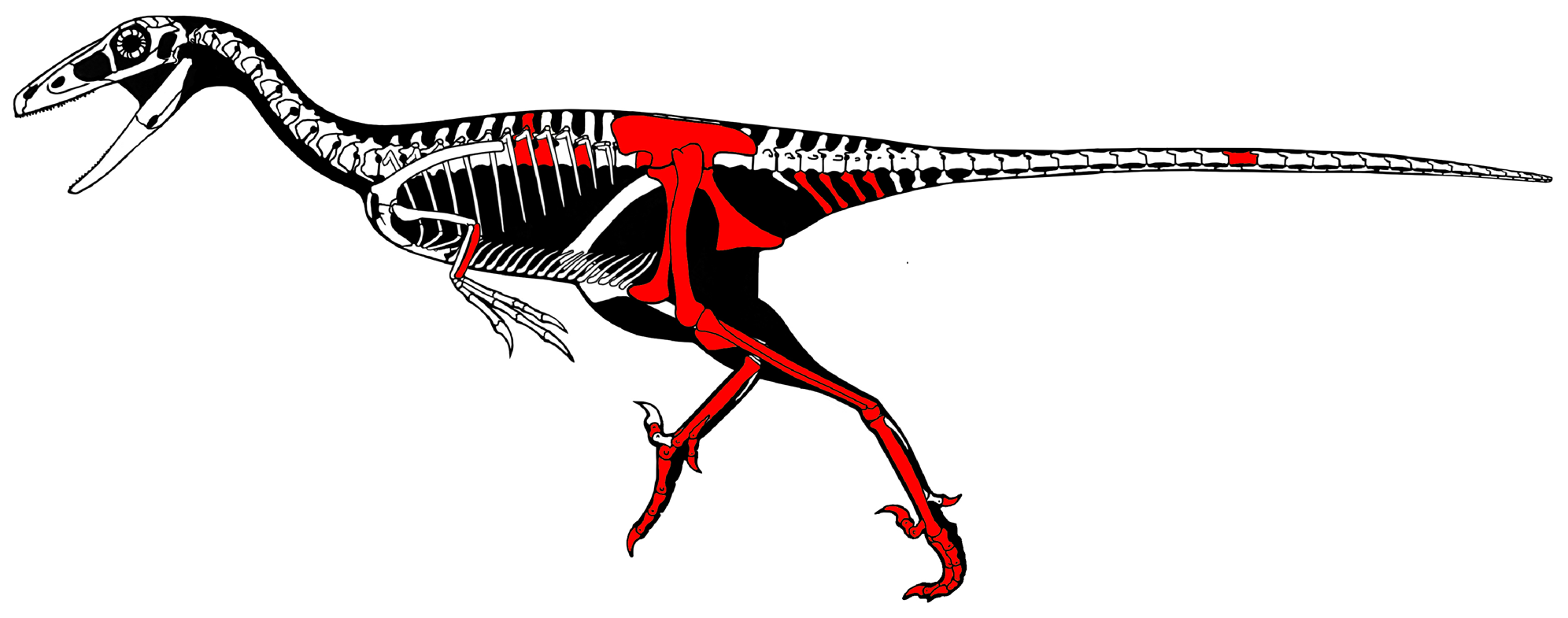
- Known material diagram of the Late Cretaceous troodontid Talos
  †Talos – type locality for genus
  - †Talos sampsoni – type locality for species
- †Tancredia – tentative report
- †Tanycolagreus
  - †Tanycolagreus topwilsoni
- †Teinostomopsis – tentative report
- †Tempskya
  - †Tempskya jonesii – type locality for species
  - †Tempskya knowltoni
  - †Tempskya minor
  - †Tempskya superba
  - †Tempskya whiteheadi – type locality for species
- †Tenontosaurus
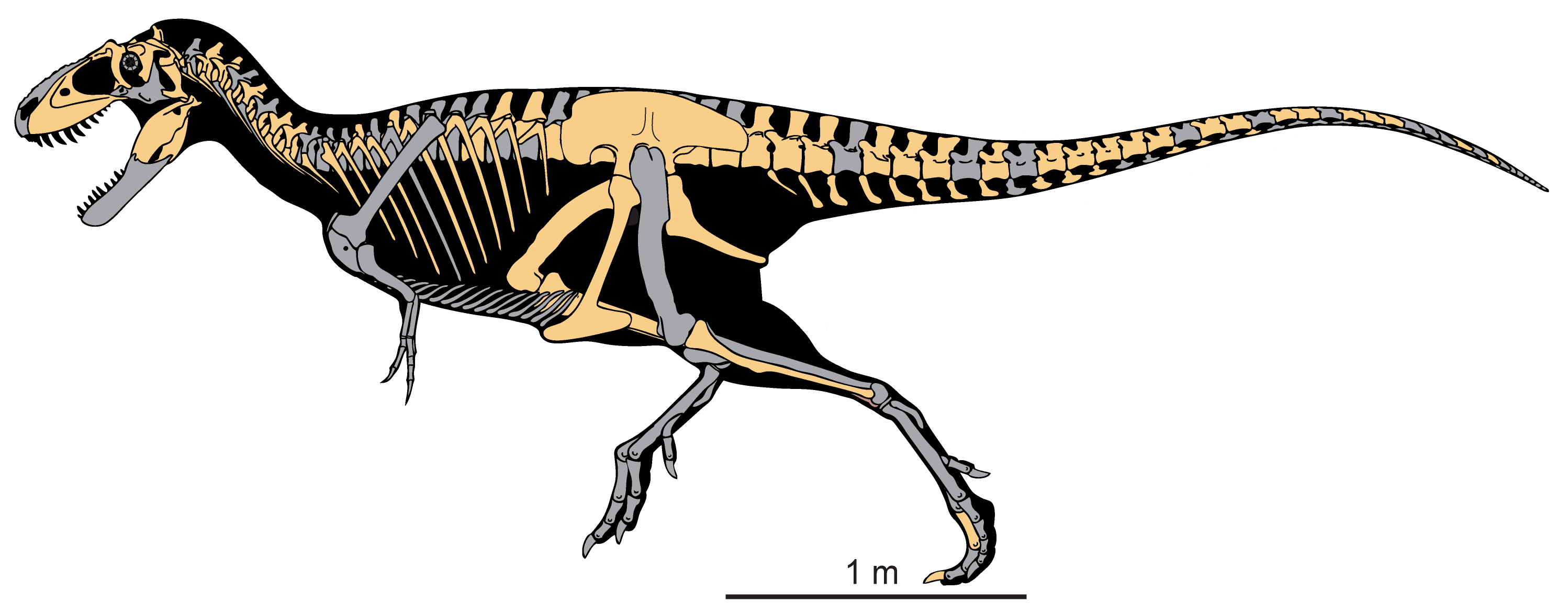
- Known material diagram of the Late Cretaceous tyrannosaur Teratophoneus
  †Teratophoneus – type locality for genus
  - †Teratophoneus curriei – type locality for species
- Teredolites
  - †Teredolites clavatus
- †Tethyaster
  - †Tethyaster jurassicus – type locality for species
- †Tetrasauropus
- †Thalassinoides
- †Therangopodus – tentative report
- †Therangospodus – type locality for genus
  - †Therangospodus pandemicus – type locality for species
- †Theretairus
- †Thescelus
  - †Thescelus insiliens
- Thracia
  - †Thracia weedi
- †Tirolites
  - †Tirolites carniolicus – tentative report
  - †Tirolites smithi – or unidentified related form
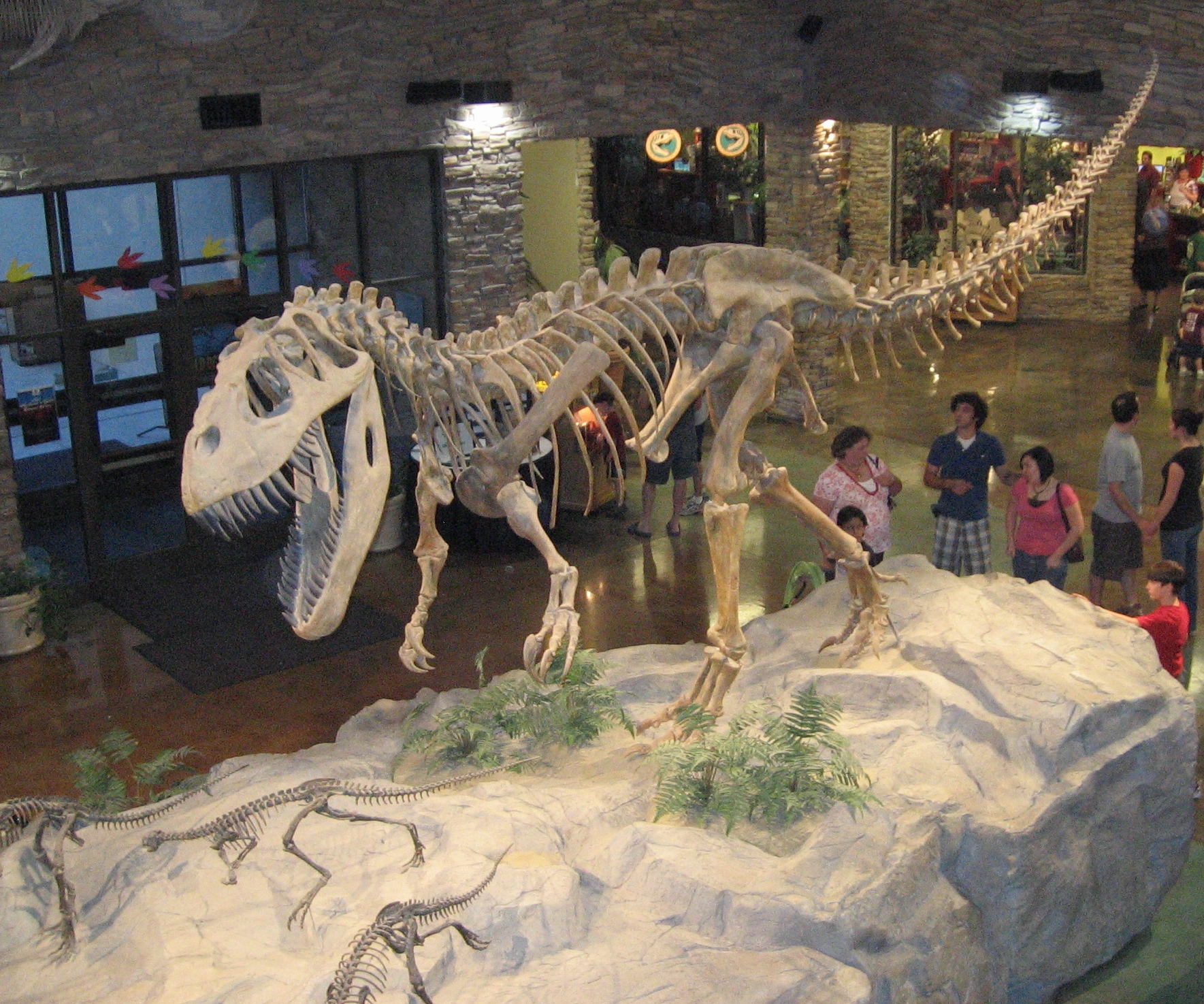
- Mounted fossilized skeleton of the Late Jurassic megalosaur Torvosaurus
  †Torvosaurus
- †Toxolophosaurus – or unidentified comparable form
- †Trachodon
- †Torosaurus
  - †Torosaurus utahensis
- †Triconolestes – type locality for genus
  - †Triconolestes curvicuspis – type locality for species
- †Trigonia
  - †Trigonia americana
  - †Trigonia elegantissima
  - †Trigonia montanaensis
- †Trigonodus
  - †Trigonodus orientalis – or unidentified comparable form
  - †Trigonodus sandbergeri – or unidentified comparable form
  - †Trigonodus sandbergi – or unidentified comparable form
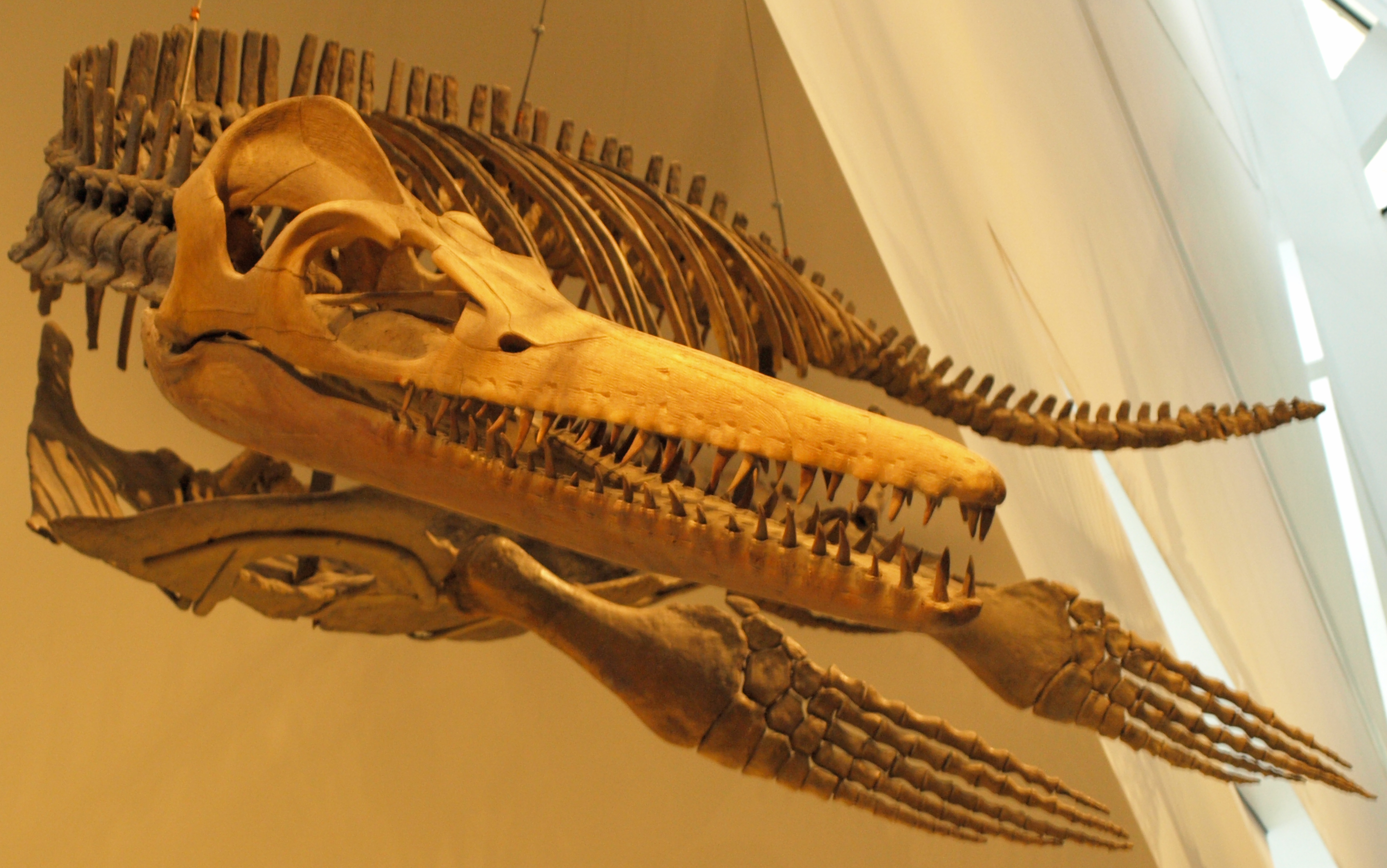
- Fossilized skeleton of the Late Cretaceous polycotylid plesiosaur Trinacromerum
  †Trinacromerum
  - †Trinacromerum bentonianum – tentative report
- †Tripennaculus – type locality for genus
  - †Tripennaculus eatoni – type locality for species
- †Trisauropodiscus
  - †Trisauropodiscus moabensis – type locality for species
- Trochocyathus
- †Trochosmilia
  - †Trochosmilia moorei – type locality for species
- †Tulotomops
  - †Tulotomops laevibasalis
- †Turgidodon – type locality for genus
  - †Turgidodon lillegraveni – type locality for species
  - †Turgidodon madseni – type locality for species
  - †Turgidodon russelli – or unidentified comparable form
- Turritella
  - †Turritella whitei
- †Tylostoma – tentative report
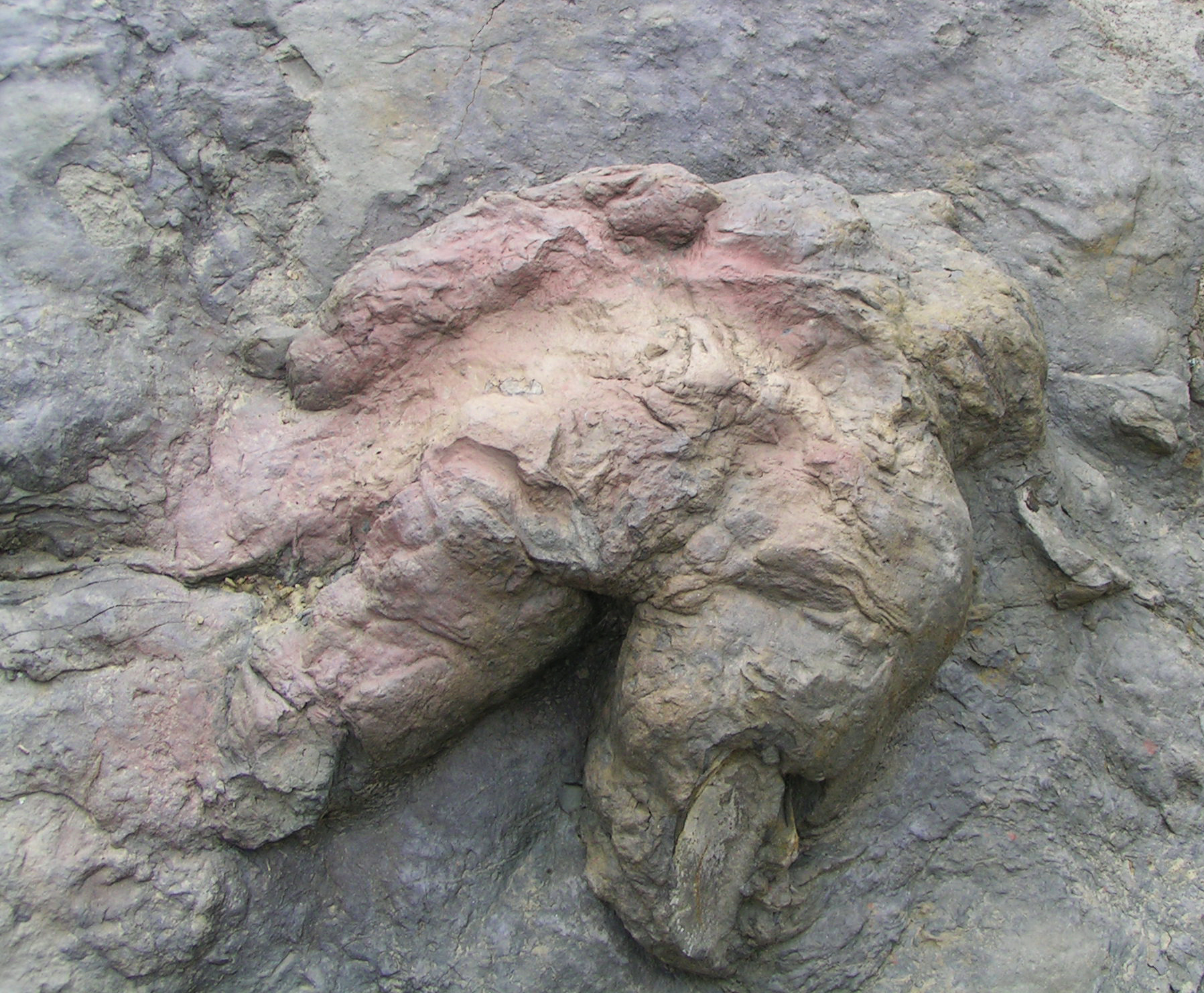
- Fossil of the Late Cretaceous tyrannosaur footprint ichnogenus Tyrannosauripus
  †Tyrannosauripus – type locality for genus
  - †Tyrannosauripus petersoni – type locality for species
- †Tyrannosaurus

== U ==
- †Undichnia
- †Unicardium
- †Unionites
  - †Unionites borealis – or unidentified comparable form
  - †Unionites fassaensis
- †Ussurites
  - †Ussurites hosei
- †Utahceratops – type locality for genus
  - †Utahceratops gettyi – type locality for species
- †Utahgenys – type locality for genus
  - †Utahgenys antongai – type locality for species
  - †Utahgenys evansi – type locality for species
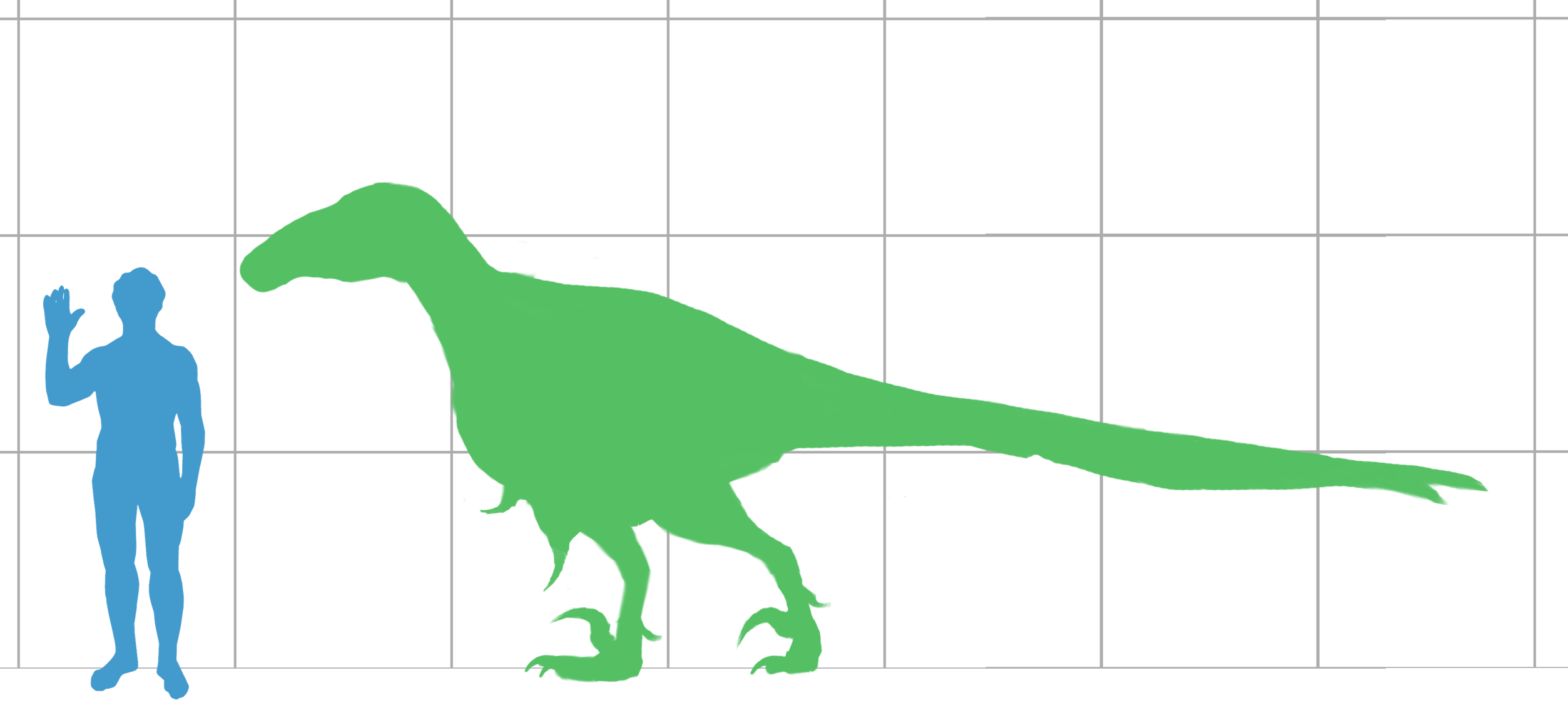
- Diagram illustrating the Early Cretaceous dromaeosaurid ("raptor") Utahraptor with an anachronistic human to scale
  †Utahraptor – type locality for genus
  - †Utahraptor ostrommaysi – type locality for species
- †Uteodon – type locality for genus
  - †Uteodon aphanoecetes – type locality for species
  - †Utetitan – type locality for genus
    - †Utetitan zellaguymondeweyae – type locality for species

== V ==
- Valvata
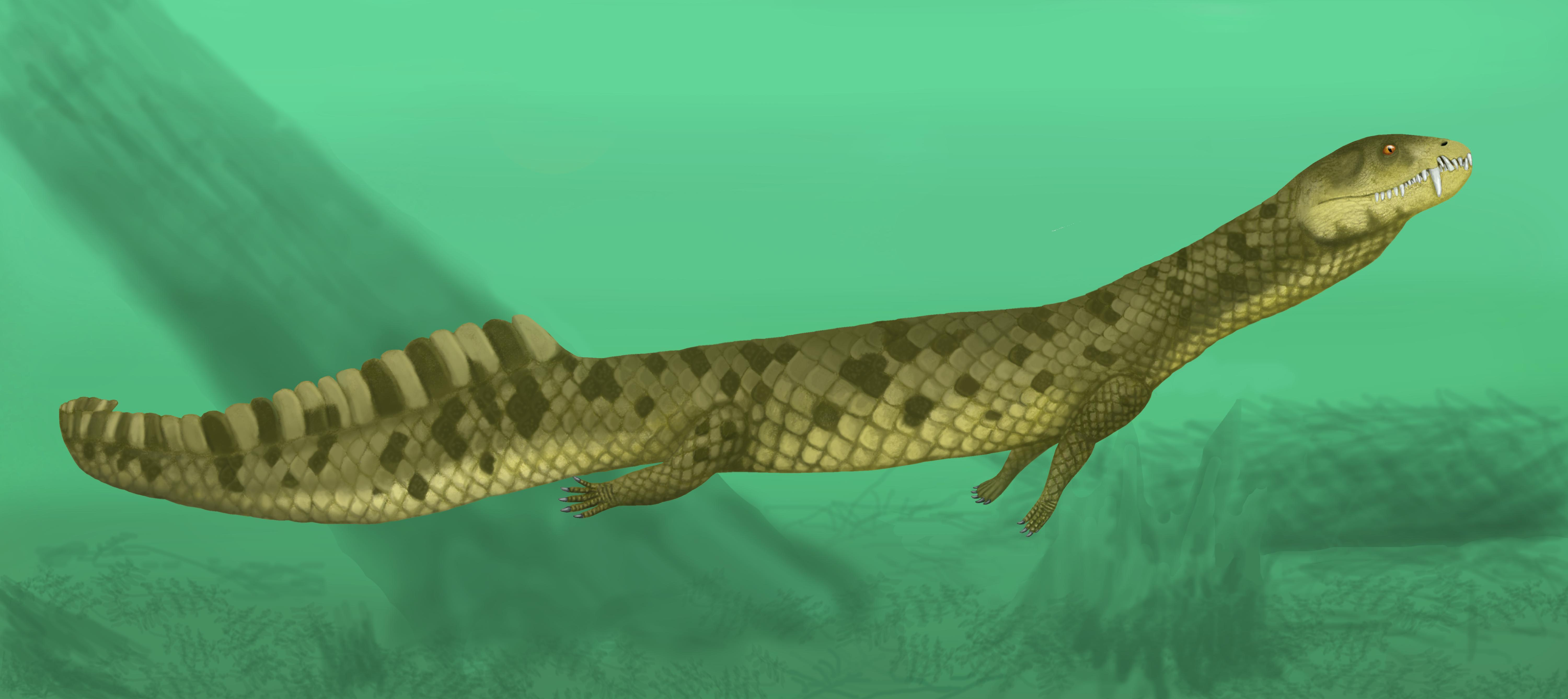
- Life restoration of the Late Triassic reptile Vancleavea
  †Vancleavea
  - †Vancleavea campi
- †Varalphadon – type locality for genus
  - †Varalphadon crebreforme – type locality for species
  - †Varalphadon wahweapensis – type locality for species
- †Vaugonia
  - †Vaugonia conradi
  - †Vaugonia utahensis
- †Venenosaurus – type locality for genus
  - †Venenosaurus dicrocei – type locality for species
- †Vercherites
  - †Vercherites undulatus – type locality for species
- †Vex
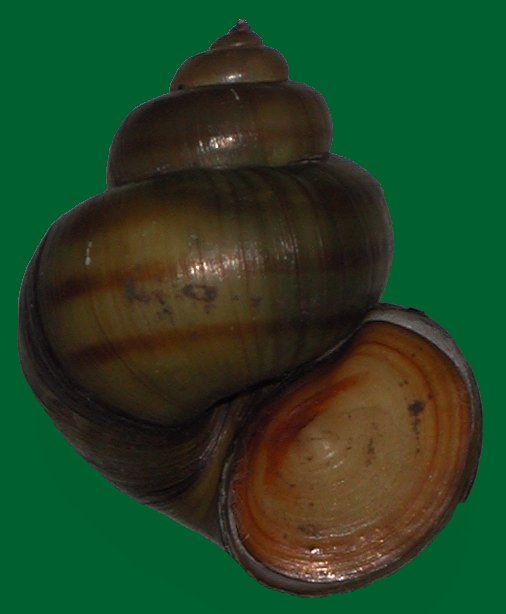
- Shell of a Viviparus freshwater snail
  Viviparus

== W ==
- †Wailiceras
  - †Wailiceras aemulus – or unidentified comparable form
- †Wasatchites
  - †Wasatchites perrini
- †Webbsaurus – type locality for genus
  - †Webbsaurus lofgreni – type locality for species
- †Worthenia
  - †Worthenia windowblindensis – type locality for species
- †Wortheniella
  - †Wortheniella canalifera – or unidentified comparable form
- †Worthoceras
- †Wyomingites
  - †Wyomingites aplanatus – or unidentified comparable form

== X ==
- †Xenoceltites
  - †Xenoceltites cordilleranus
  - †Xenoceltites subevolutus
- †Xiaoqiaoceras – tentative report
  - †Xiaoqiaoceras americanum – type locality for species

== Y ==
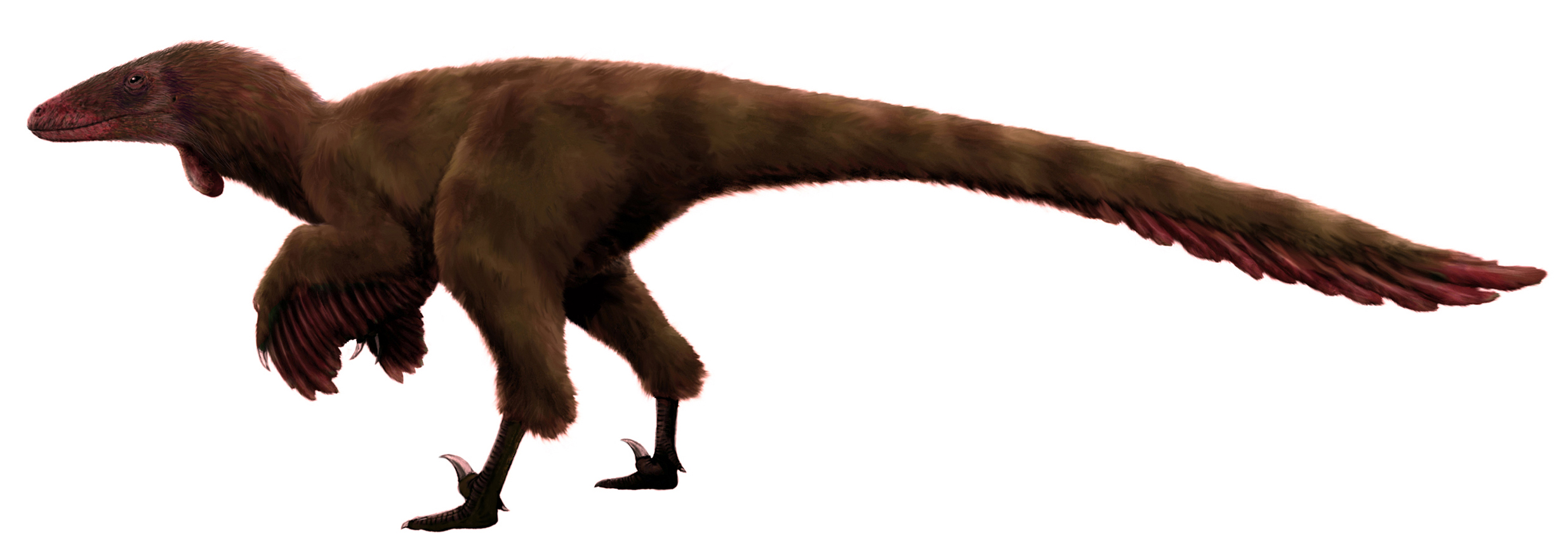
- Life restoration of the Early Cretaceous dromaeosaurid ("raptor") Yurgovuchia
  †Yurgovuchia – type locality for genus
  - †Yurgovuchia doellingi – type locality for species

== Z ==
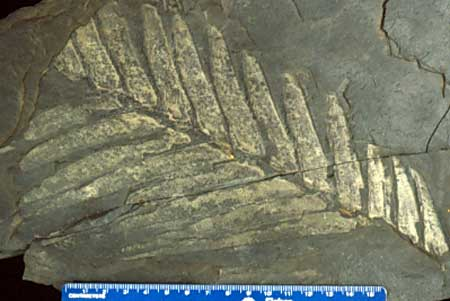
- Fossil of the Early Triassic-Eocene cycad-like frond Zamites
  †Zamites
  - †Zamites powelli
  - †Zamites tidwellii – type locality for species
- †Zygiocuspis – type locality for genus
  - †Zygiocuspis goldingi – type locality for species
- †Zygopleura
  - †Zygopleura haasi – type locality for species
