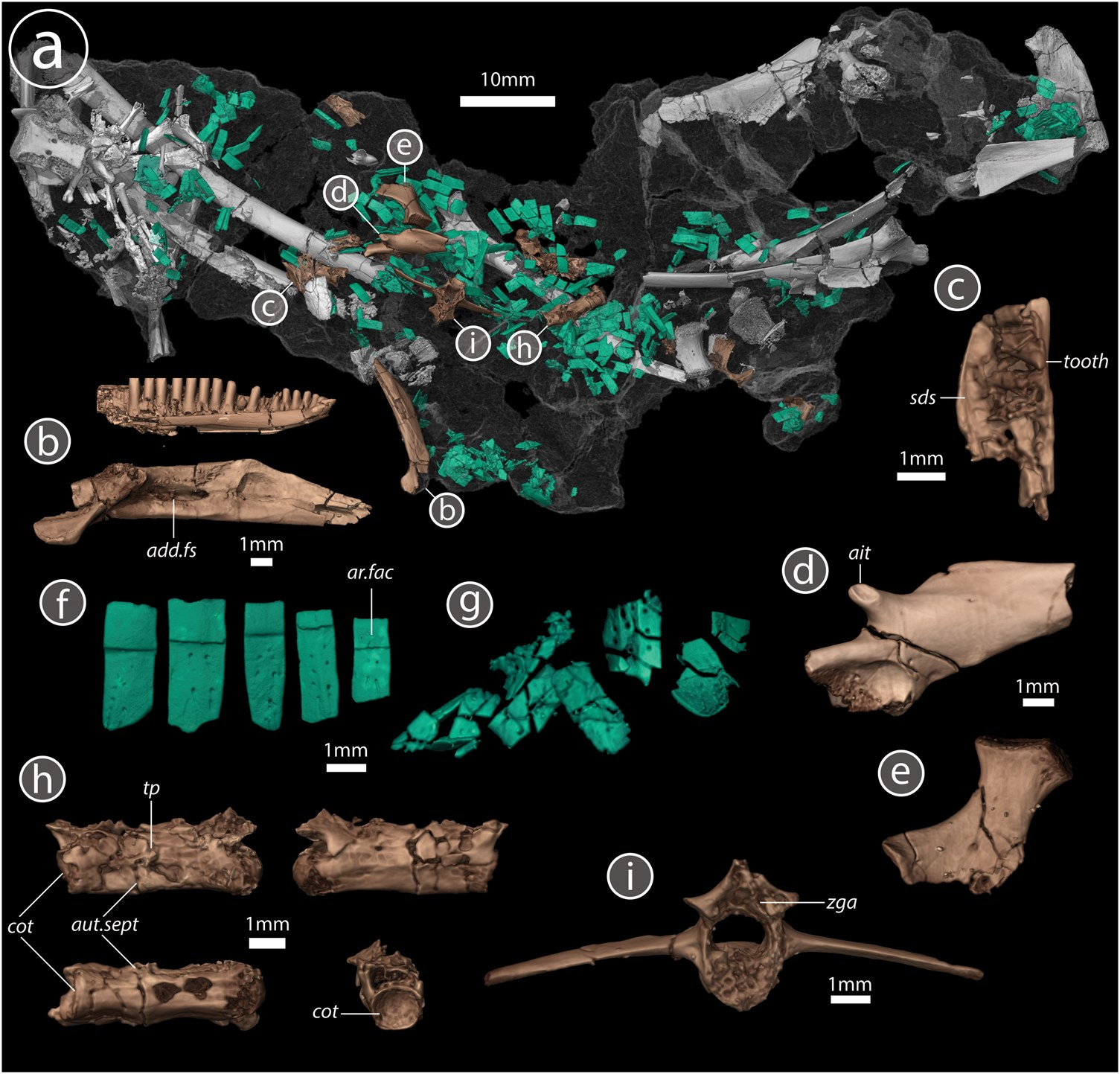
- Micro-CT data of the holotype (note scattered osteoderms in teal)

Scientific classification
- Kingdom: Animalia
- Phylum: Chordata
- Class: Reptilia
- Order: Squamata
- Family: Gerrhosauridae
- Subfamily: Zonosaurinae
- Genus: †Konkasaurus; Krause et al., 2003
- Species: †K. mahalana

Binomial name
- †Konkasaurus mahalana Krause et al., 2003

= Konkasaurus =

Konkasaurus Temporal range: Late Cretaceous, Maastrichtian

Genus of extinct lizard

Konkasaurus (lit. 'very old lizard') is an extinct genus of plated lizard (family Gerrhosauridae), known from the Late Cretaceous (Maastrichtian age) Maevarano Formation of Madagascar. The genus contains a single species, Konkasaurus mahalana, known from a partial skeleton and several osteoderms. Konkasaurus was named and first described in 2003, at which point it was tentatively identified as a member of the family Cordylidae (girdled lizards). A more detailed analysis in 2026 using micro-CT scans of the available fossils instead suggested affinities with the cordylid sister group, Gerrhosauridae. Konkasaurus was the first lizard fossil identified from the Late Cretaceous of Africa, and is the oldest known lizard taxon from Madagascar.

== History ==
=== Discovery ===
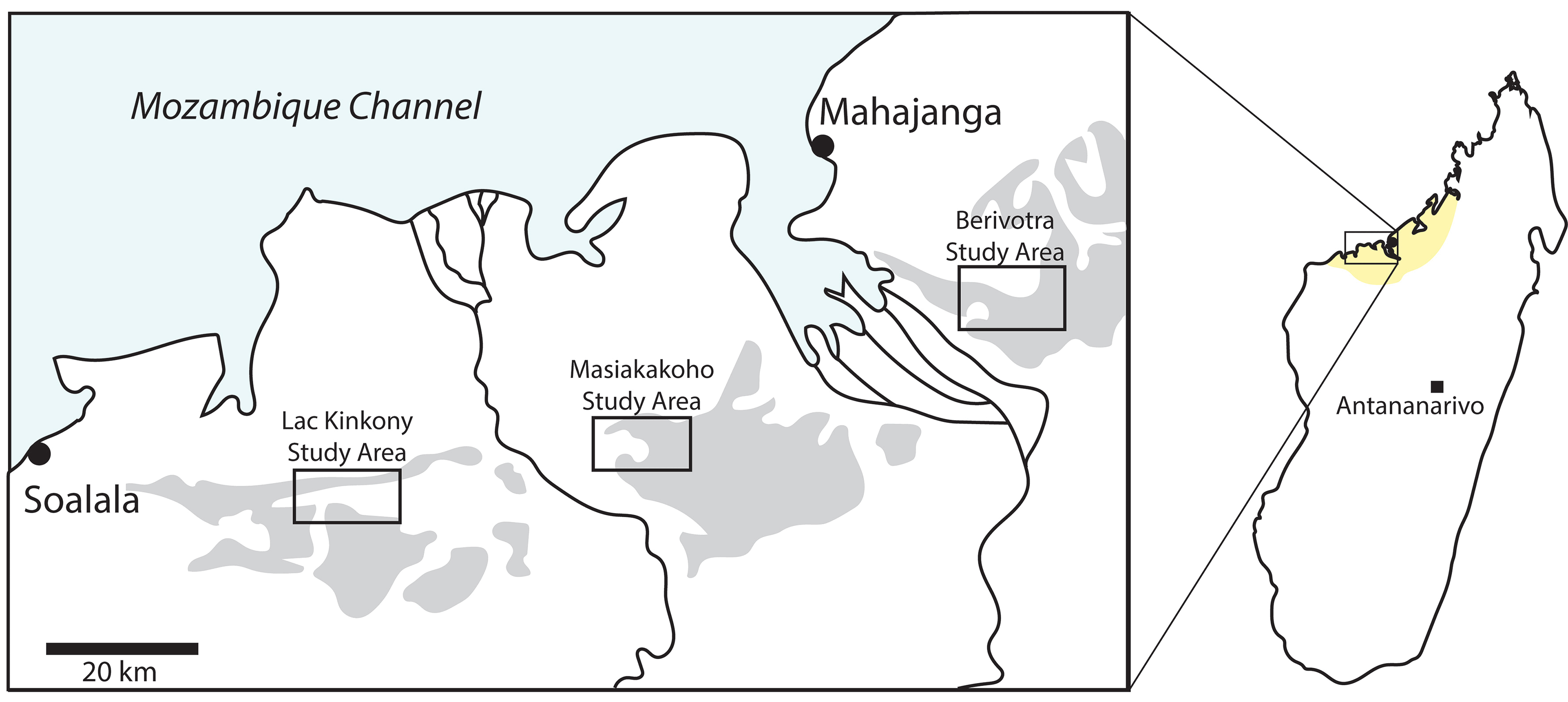
Maevarano Formation outcrop localities, including the Berivotra study site (right)

In August 1993, a joint expedition between Stony Brook University and the University of Antananarivo was conducted to the Maevarano Formation (Mahajanga Basin) of northwestern Madagascar. During fieldwork at the MAD93-33 locality near Berivotra, representing the Anembalemba Member of the formation, Joseph A. Rabarison discovered a jumbled assemblage of several skeletons of the crocodyliform Araripesuchus tsangatsangana. These fossils were collected in two plaster jackets and transported to Stony Brook University, where they were prepared over the following years.

In August 2001, Virginia Heisey, a technician working on the preparation, discovered the dentary (lower jaw bone) of a lizard amongst the Araripesuchus bones. Further preparation in this region revealed the presence of several additional lizard bones of a comparable size. The fossil contents of these jackets were then transferred to the University of Antananarivo (UA), where they were permanently accessioned. The lizard material was catalogued as specimen UA 8715. The bones identified included almost all of the left lower jaw (comprising the dentary, surangular, articular, and prearticular), part of the left clavicle and pelvic girdle (left ilium and both ischia), various ribs, several vertebrae (including a trunk vertebra and several caudal (tail) vertebrae), various manual and pedal (hand and foot) bones, and more than 400 osteoderms. The somewhat disarticulated nature of the bones, and their placement amid better-articulated skeletons of larger predators, may suggest this lizard was part of the gut contents of one of the Araripesuchus individuals, though this can not be proven or rigorously tested.

=== Naming and early research ===
In 2003, David W. Krause, Susan E. Evans, and Ke-Qin Gao described Konkasaurus mahalana as a new genus and species of scincoid lizard based on these fossil remains, designating UA 8715 as the holotype specimen. They confidently referred it to the scincoid clade Cordyliformes, which is composed of the two families Cordylidae and Gerrhosauridae. Between these two, they tentatively regarded it as a cordylid. The generic name, Konkasaurus, combines the Malagasy word konka, meaning 'very old', with the Ancient Greek σαῦρος (saûros), meaning 'lizard'. The specific name, mahalana, is a Malagasy word meaning 'scarce', referencing the rarity of lizard fossils in the Maevarano fauna.

Although Krause and colleagues did not conduct a phylogenetic analysis to quantitatively assess the relationships of Konkasaurus, later researchers followed its classification as a cordylid or cordyliform. Recognizing its importance as the oldest member of the Cordyliformes, multiple researchers in the following years used Konkasaurus as a calibration point for the origination of these clades in molecular phylogenies.

=== Reassessment ===
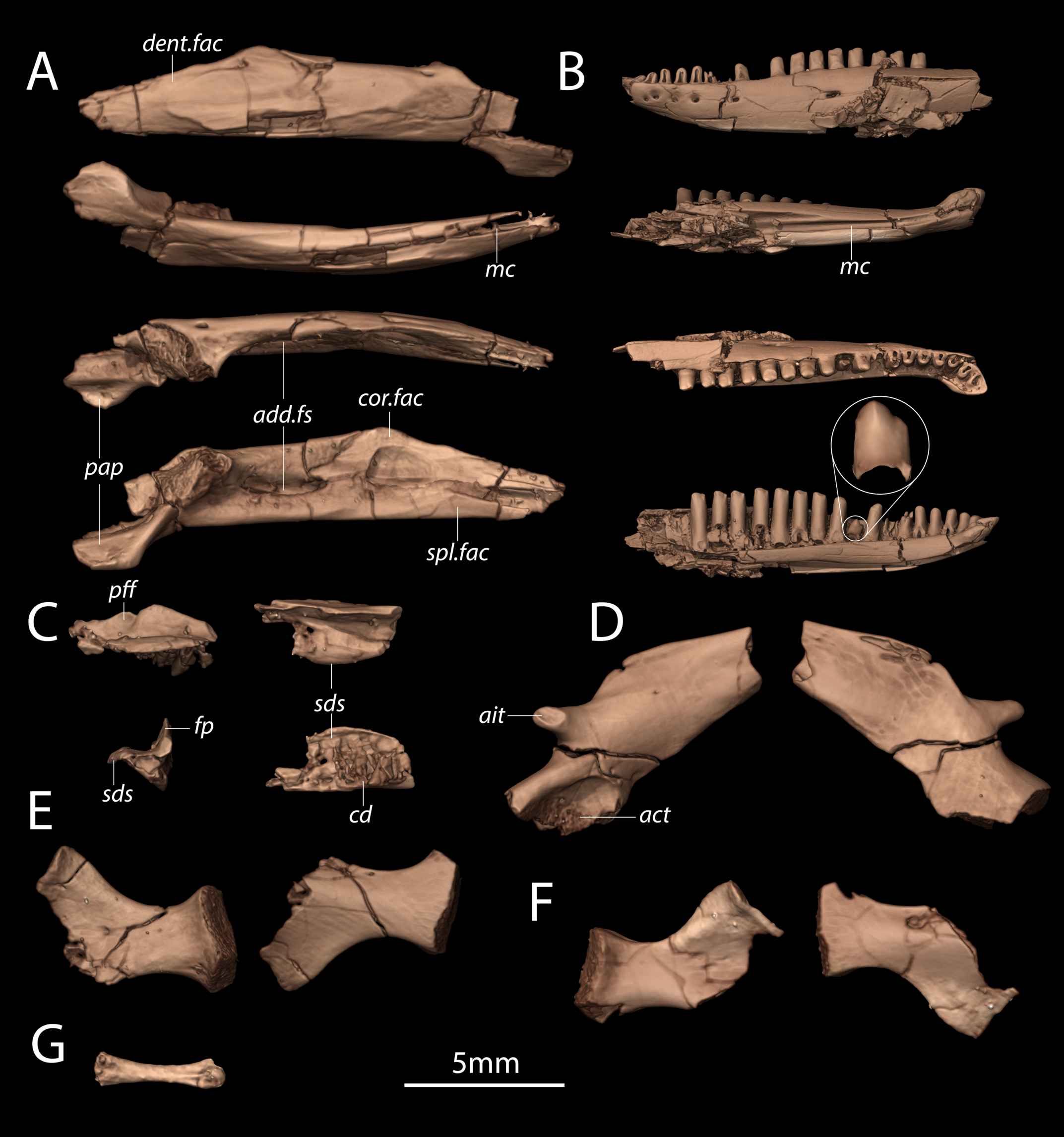
Mandible (A, B), maxilla (C), pelvic bones (D–F), and phalanx (G) of Konkasaurus

In his 2013 PhD thesis, Edward L. Stanley conducted an initial reassessment of the K. mahalana holotype using CT scans obtained at the American Museum of Natural History. Stanley concluded that Konkasaurus was not a cordylid, but a gerrhosaurid. A more comprehensive analysis of Konkasaurus was formally published by Stanley and colleagues in 2026. These researchers used micro-CT scans from the University of Florida to study the K. mahalana holotype and two other, more recently discovered, specimens of this species in greater detail. These additional specimens were found in the same stratigraphic layer of the Maevarano Formation as the holotype, but in different localities. UA 12943, a single isolated osteoderm, was collected from locality MAD93-25 (also near Berivotra). DMNH EPV.142201, accessioned at the Denver Museum of Nature & Science, consists of several osteoderms from the locality MAD07-20 (Masiakakoho area). The new scans of the holotype revealed many new anatomical features that are otherwise obscured, in addition to a previously unrecognized fragmentary left maxilla (upper jaw bone) and additional distal caudal vertebrae (at least four were recognized by Krause et al., but Stanley et al. identified nine).

== Description ==
Konkasaurus is a small scincomorph lizard, with a head length of around 15–20 millimetres (0.59–0.79 in) and an estimated snout–vent length of 110 millimetres (4.3 in). Its body was entirely covered in osteoderms (bony plates). The mandibular dentition is heterodont; the teeth at the front of the mouth are small, with circular cross-sections, while the teeth toward the back of the jaw are larger, with rectangular cross-sections. These rear teeth range from bicuspid to faintly tricuspid. The front teeth are heavily worn. Deccansaurus, a possible cordyliform from the Intertrappean Beds (latest Cretaceous to earliest Paleocene) of India, is known from jaws and teeth that are similar in many respects to those of Konkasaurus. However, Deccansaurus has taller teeth with more pointed crowns. The teeth of Konkasaurus exhibit pleurodont implantation (outer surface of teeth fused to inner surface of jaw bone). The mandibular ramus is slender, tapering toward the symphysis, with minimal curvature along the ventral margin.

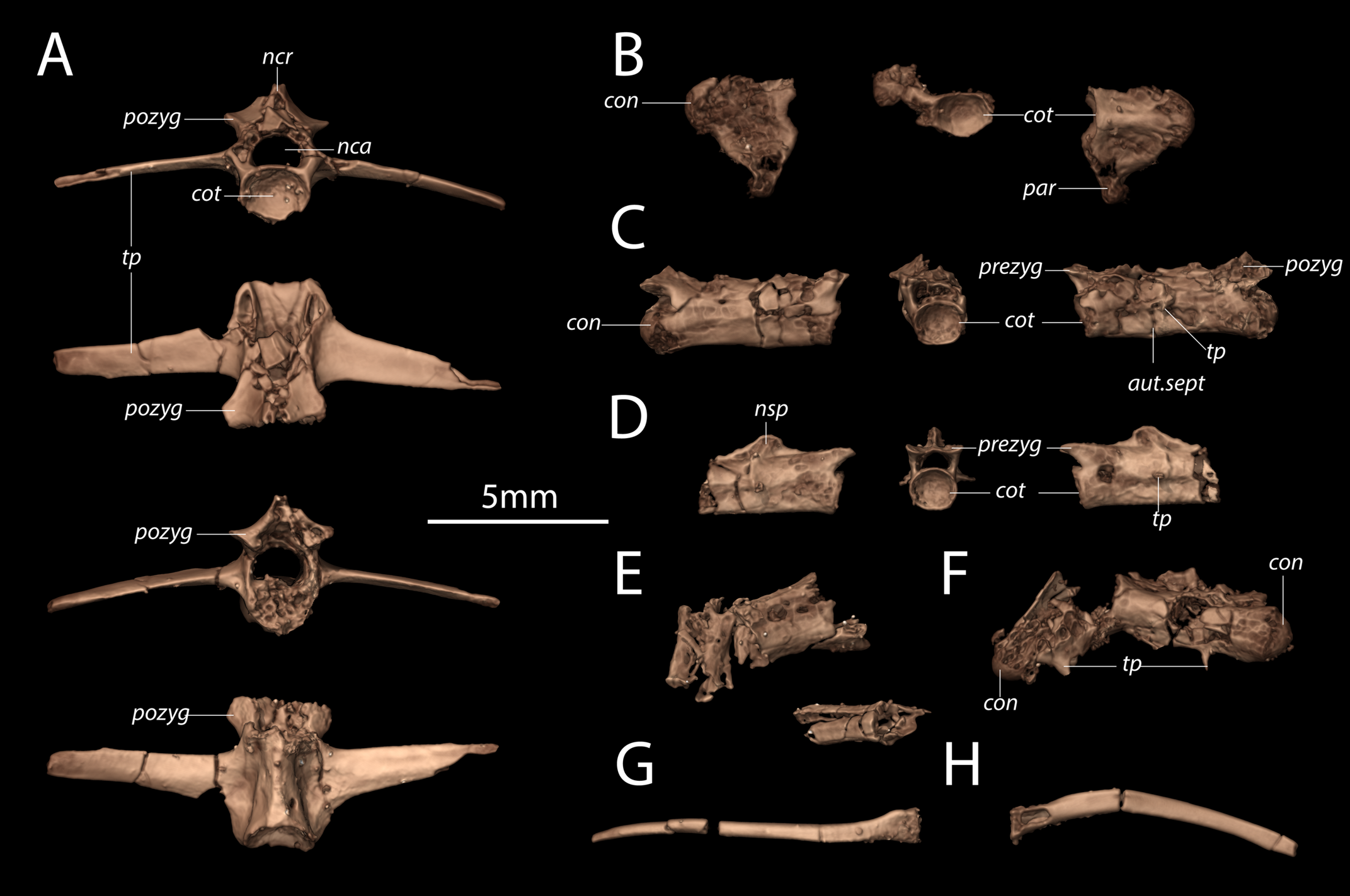
Vertebrae (A–F) and ribs (G, H) of Konkasaurus. Note the autotomal septum (aut.sept) in C.

The ilium has a deep, short blade, and the anterior iliac tubercle is pronounced. The caudal (tail) vertebrae have a weakly developed zygosphene–zygantrum accessory articulation. Furthermore, the tail vertebrae have autotomal septa which run dorsoventrally (from top to bottom) in front of the transverse processes. These septa can facilitate caudal autotomy (tail shedding). The osteoderms of Konkasaurus are simple and rectangular in shape. Most of them are around 2–3 mm (0.079–0.118 in) long and 1–1.5 mm (0.039–0.059 in) wide. The osteoderms can generally be separated into two morphotypes: shorter forms with articular facets about one-third the total length, and longer, narrower forms with shorter facets about one-sixth the total length. Based on the arrangement of similar plate-like osteoderms in extant (modern) lizards, the broader osteoderms were likely positioned on the trunk and limbs, while the more narrow osteoderms covered the tail.

== Classification ==
To test the affinities and relationships of Konkasaurus, Stanley et al. (2026) included it in a phylogenetic matrix combining molecular and morphological data for 83 extant lepidosaurs (including the tuatara, a rhynchocephalian) and morphological data only for 32 fossil squamates. Among these are four members of the Cordyliformes: two gerrhosaurids (Cordylosaurus subtessellatus, a gerrhosaurine, and Zonosaurus ornatus, a zonosaurine) and two cordylids. The phylogenetic analysis recovered Konkasaurus as the sister taxon to Zonosaurus, indicating a placement within the gerrhosaurid subfamily Zonosaurinae. These results are displayed in the cladogram below. ⊞ symbols can be clicked to expand nodes.

- Pan-Scincoidea
  - †Paramacellodidae
    ⊞
    - - †Microteras
      - †Parmeosaurus
    - - †Becklesius
      - †Eoscincus
    ⊟
  - Scincoidea
    - Cordyloidea
      - Cordyliformes
        - Cordylidae (girdled lizards)
          - Platysaurus
          - Smaug
        - Gerrhosauridae (plated lizards)
          - Gerrhosaurinae
            Cordylosaurus
          - Zonosaurinae
            - †Konkasaurus
            - Zonosaurus
      - Pan-Xantusiidae (night lizard total group)
        ⊞
        - †Retinosaurus
        - - †Tepexisaurus
          - Xantusiidae (night lizards)
            - Cricosaura
            - - †Catactegenys
              - - Xantusia
                - - †Palepidophyma
                  - - Lepidophyma
                    - †Palaeoxantusia
        ⊟
    - Scincidae (skinks)
      ⊞
      - - †Carusia
        - †Myrmecodaptria
      - - - †Eoxanta
          - - †Globaura
            - †Hymenosaurus
        - - - Acontias
            - †Electroscincus
          - - - - Eugongylus
                - Sphenomorphus
              - - Tiliqua
                - Trachylepis
            - - Brachymeles
              - - - Amphiglossus
                  - Feylinia
                - - Plestiodon
                  - Scincus
      ⊟

Krause et al. (2003) had tentatively placed Konkasaurus within Cordylidae (the sister group to Gerrhosauridae) based on the combination of simple imbricating osteoderms and the lack of compound osteoderms. Compound osteoderms are present in skinks (Scincidae) and gerrhosaurids, but are loosely associated with the rest of the integument, making it less likely for them to be preserved in a disarticulated specimen. This would be especially applicable if the K. mahalana holotype is the partially-digested gut contents of a larger animal. As such, Konkasaurus likely would have had compound osteoderms on its underside, like in gerrhosaurids, that are not readily apparent in the available specimens. Small fragments observed in the matrix of the holotype may be parts of compound osteoderms, but they could also be distorted simple osteoderms or fragments of other bones.

== Palaeoenvironment ==
Palaeoenvironmental reconstructions of the Maevarano Formation

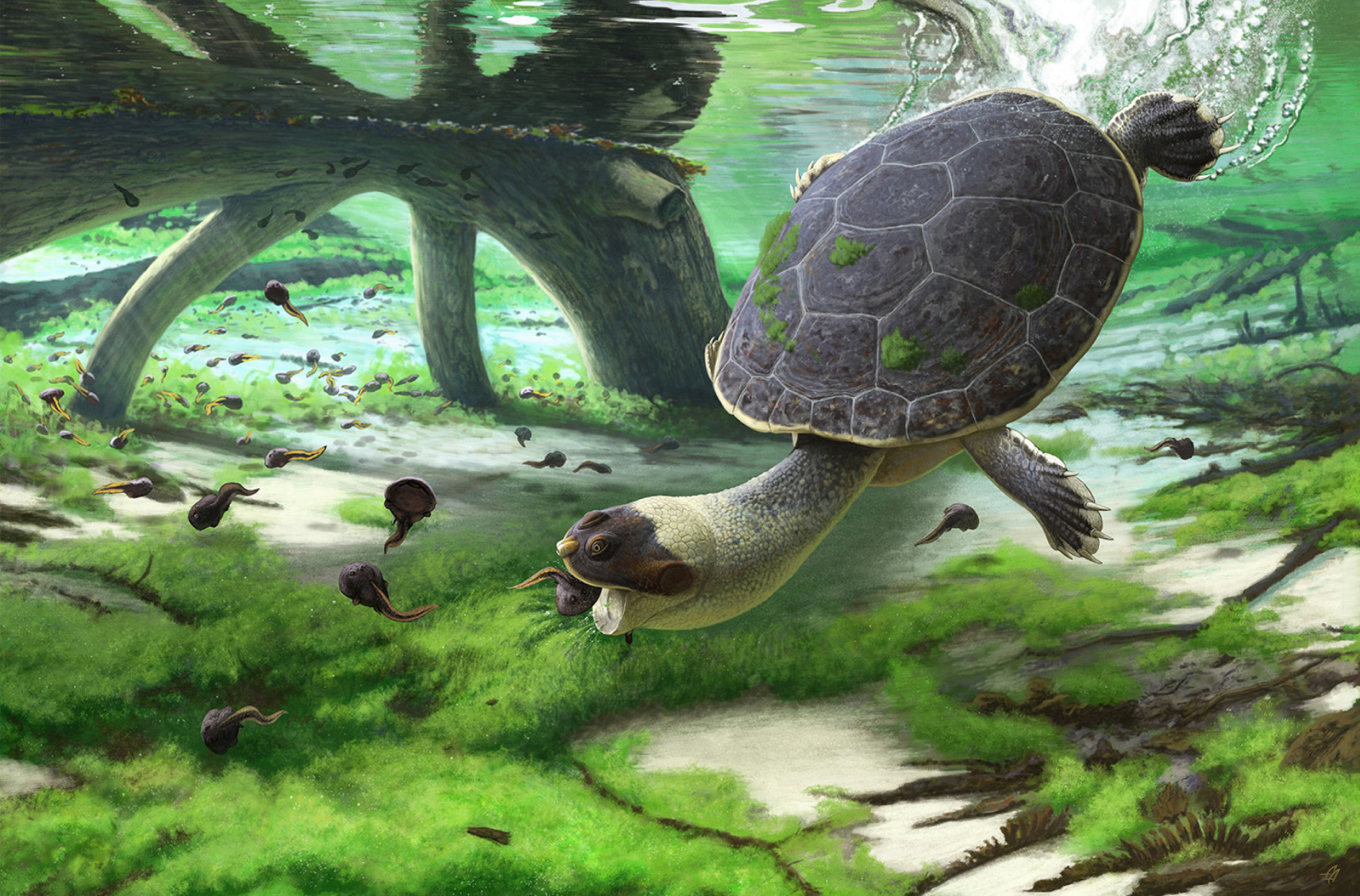
Aquatic reconstruction of the turtle Sahonachelys with Beelzebufo tadpoles

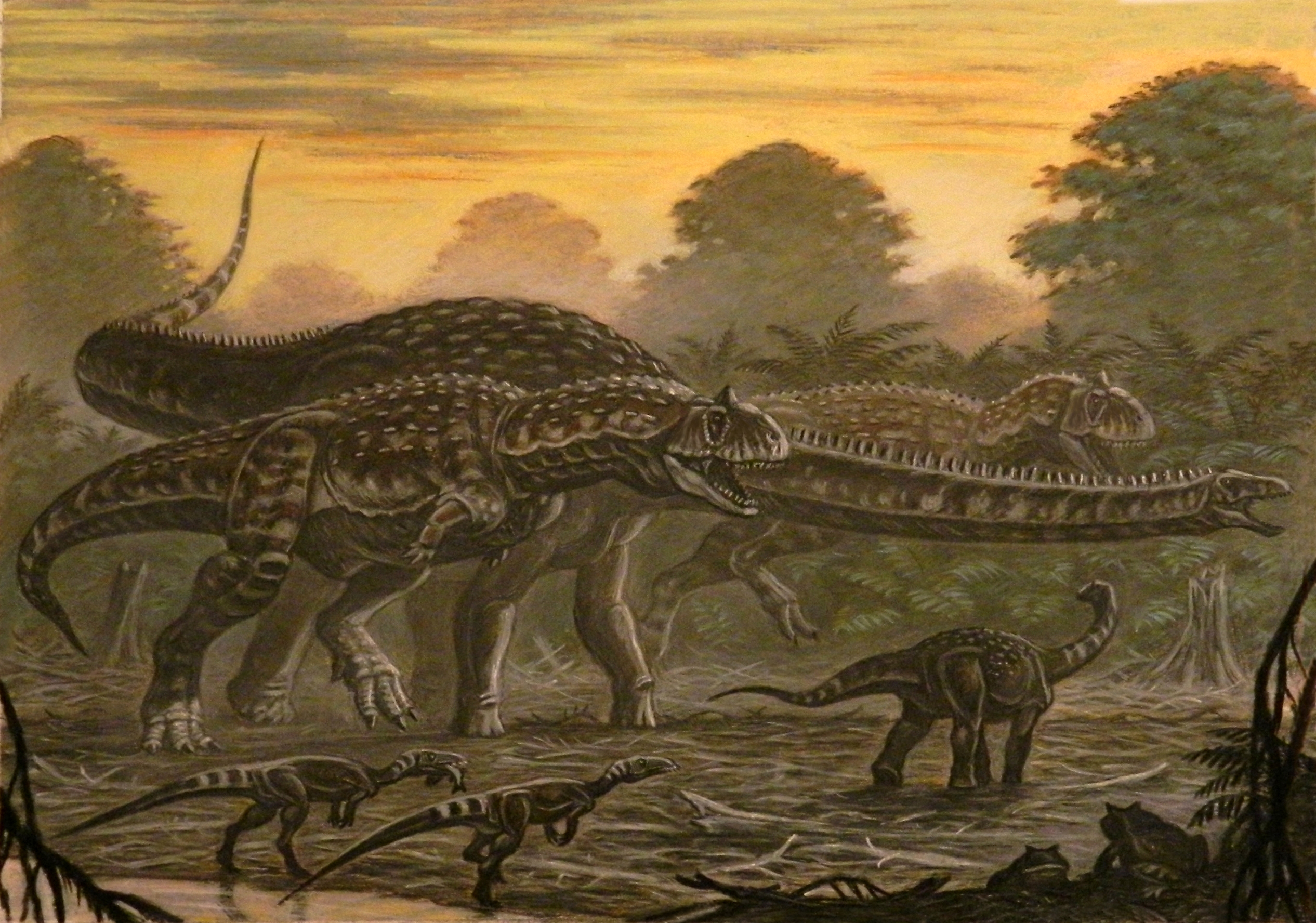
Terrestrial reconstruction of the dinosaurs Majungasaurus, Masiakasaurus, and Rapetosaurus

Konkasaurus is known from the Maevarano Formation, which dates to the Maastrichtian age of the late Cretaceous period. Marine incursions (rising sea levels and tectonic activity resulting in the inundation of continental land) during the Maastrichtian resulted in much of the Maevarano alluvial plain being covered by water over time. The climate was semiarid and paleosols suggest vegetation was abundant, likely fluctuating with the seasons.

A diverse fauna has been recovered from the Maevarano Formation, including many fish, various reptiles, amphibians, and mammals, and several dinosaurs (including birds). Among the named squamates, Konkasaurus is the only lizard, though several snakes have been described. These include the madtsoiids Adinophis, Madtsoia, and Menarana, and the nigerophiids Indophis and Kelyophis. Other herpetofauna include the turtles Kinkonychelys, Sahonachelys, and Sokatra (all pleurodires, or side-necked turtles), the crocodylomorphs Araripesuchus, Mahajangasuchus, Miadanasuchus, and Simosuchus, and the giant frog Beelzebufo. Three mammals have been named from the Maevarano Formation, all of which are classified as gondwanatherians: Adalatherium, Lavanify, and Vintana. All of the dinosaurs named from the Maevarano Formation belong to the group Saurischia, comprising two titanosaurian sauropods (Rapetosaurus and Vahiny), the non-avian theropods Majungasaurus and Masiakasaurus, and the paravian (closer to birds) theropods Falcatakely, Rahonavis, and Vorona.
