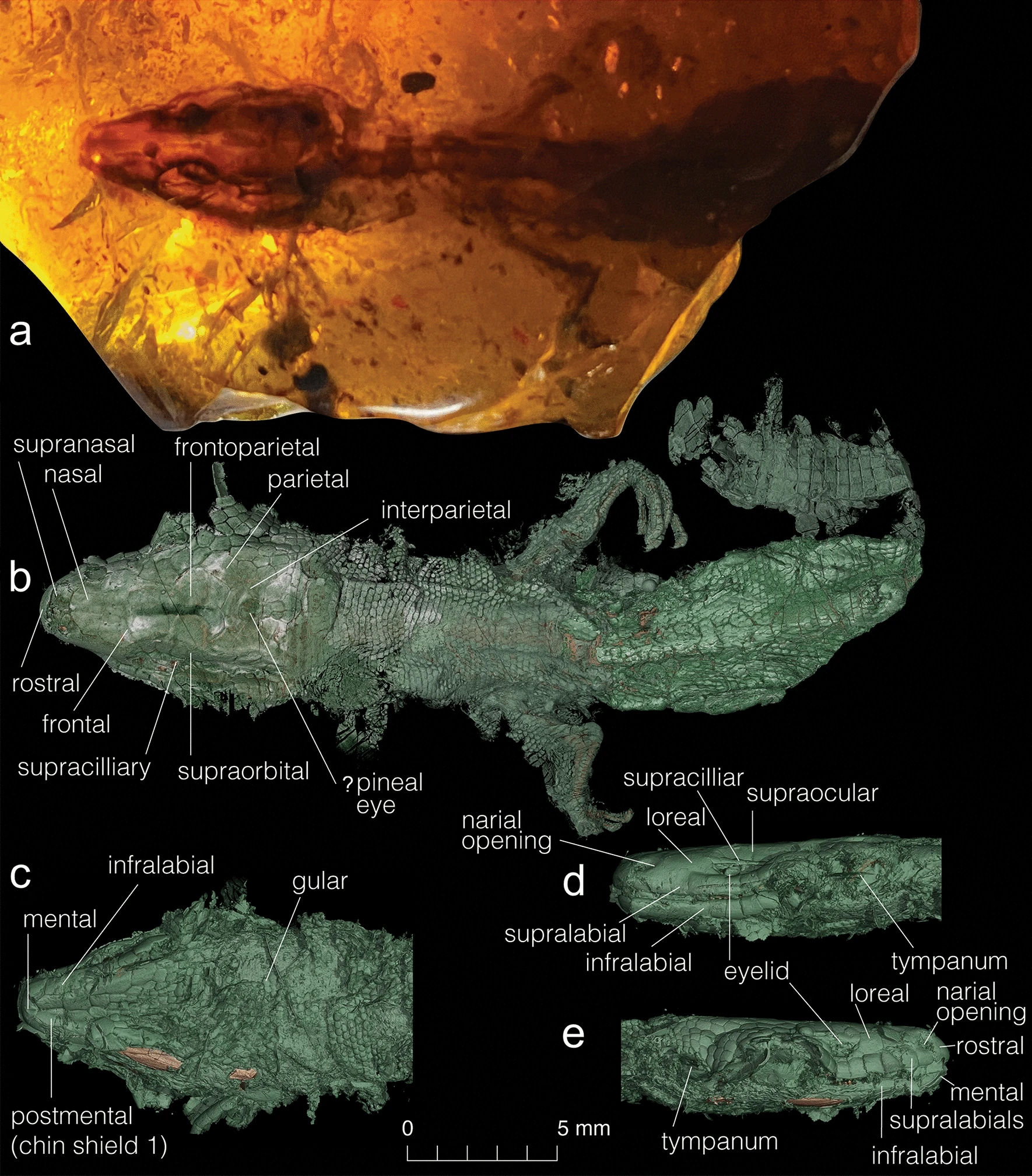
- (a) Photograph of the specimen in amber and (b-e) HRCT rendering of the integument

Scientific classification
- Kingdom: Animalia
- Phylum: Chordata
- Order: Squamata
- Infraorder: Scincomorpha
- Genus: †Retinosaurus; Čerňanský et al., 2022
- Species: †R. hkamtiensis

Binomial name
- †Retinosaurus hkamtiensis Čerňanský et al., 2022

= Retinosaurus =

Retinosaurus Temporal range: Early Cretaceous, (early Albian), 110 Ma

Genus of extinct lizard

Retinosaurus (meaning "amber lizard") is an extinct genus of scincomorph lizard from the Early Cretaceous of Myanmar. The genus contains a single species, Retinosaurus hkamtiensis, known from a specimen preserved in amber.

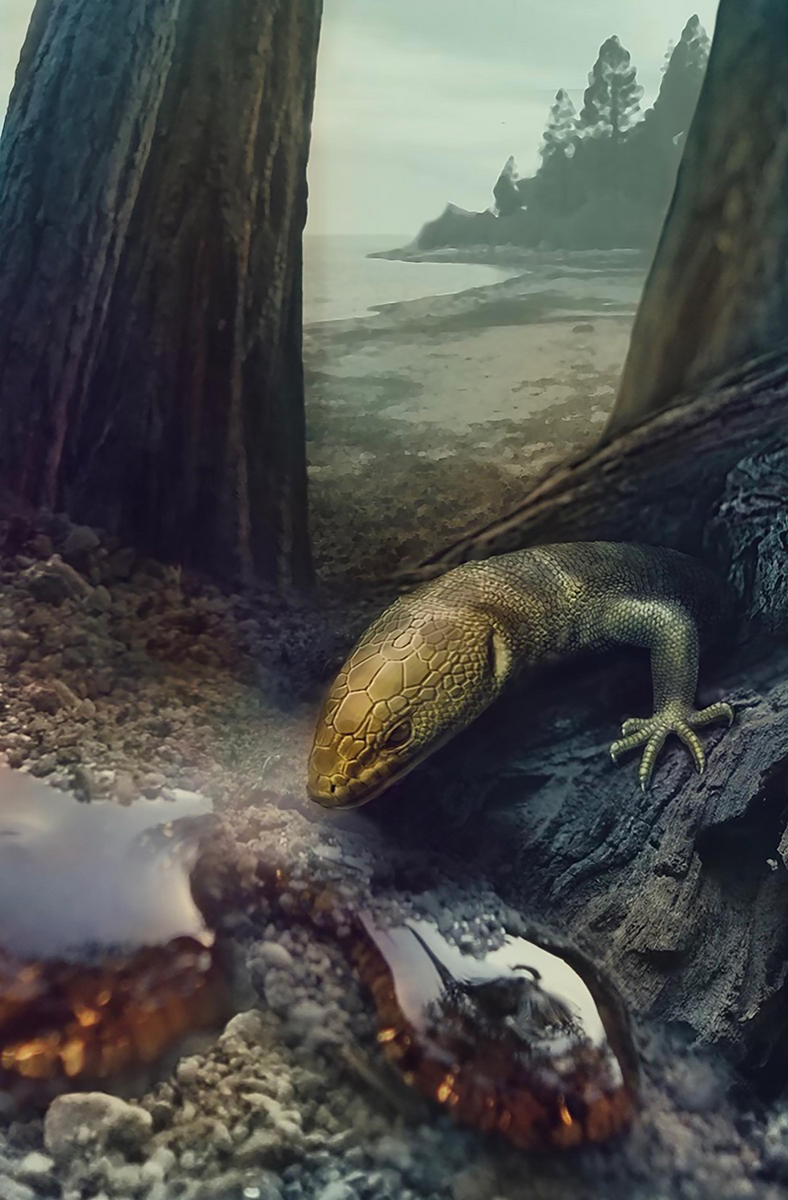
Life restoration of the holotype individual before being trapped in amber

== Discovery and naming ==
The holotype specimen, GRS 29689, was legally obtained from a Myanmar gem dealer in 2019. It was subsequently announced in a preprint by Čerňanský et al. in October 2021, and validly described as a new genus and species of lizard upon publication in January 2022.

The fossil was discovered in the Hkamti amber site of Myanmar, which dates to the early Albian, approximately 110 million years ago. The holotype, which represents a juvenile individual, includes a well-preserved articulated skull, partial postcrania, and skin impressions. In addition to the lizard fossil material, the amber also contains several coleopterans.

The generic name, "Retinosaurus", is derived from the Greek words "retine", referring to liquid resins created by trees, and "saurus", meaning "lizard". The specific name, "hkamtiensis", references Hkamti, the type locality.

== Classification ==
In all but one of the phylogenetic analyses performed by Čerňanský et al. (2022), Retinosaurus was recovered as a Pan-xantusiid. Most phylogenies resulted with Retinosaurus as a sister taxon to a clade formed by Tepexisaurus + Xantusiidae. Because the holotype represents an immature individual, the authors explain that any phylogenetic results should be treated with caution. Their results are displayed in the cladogram below:

- - - Lacertoidea
    - Toxicofera
  - - †Parmeosaurus scutatus
    - - †Paramacellodus oweni
      - - - †Carusia intermedia
          - †Myrmecodaptria microphagosa
        - - - †Eoxanta lacertifrons
            - - †Globaura venusta
              - †Hymenosaurus clarki
          - - Scincidae
            - - Cordyloidea
              - - †Retinosaurus hkamtiensis
                - - †Tepexisaurus tepexii
                  - Xantusiidae
                    - Cricosaura typica (Cuban night lizard)
                    - - Lepidophyma flavimaculatum (Yellow-spotted tropical night lizard)
                      - Xantusia vigilis (Desert night lizard)
                      - †Palaeoxantusia fera
                      - †Palepidophyma kyrentos
                      - †Catactegenys solaster
