= Lepidophyma gaigeae =

Conservation status
- Vulnerable (IUCN 3.1)

Scientific classification
- Kingdom: Animalia
- Phylum: Chordata
- Class: Reptilia
- Order: Squamata
- Family: Xantusiidae
- Genus: Lepidophyma
- Species: L. gaigeae

Binomial name
- Lepidophyma gaigeae Mosauer, 1936

Synonyms
- Lepidophyma gaigeae Mosauer, 1936; Gaigeia gaigeae — H.M. Smith, 1939; Lepidophyma gaigeae — Savage, 1963; Lepidophyma (Gaigeia) gaigeae — H.M Smith, 1973; Lepidophyma gaigeae — Liner, 2007

Species of lizard

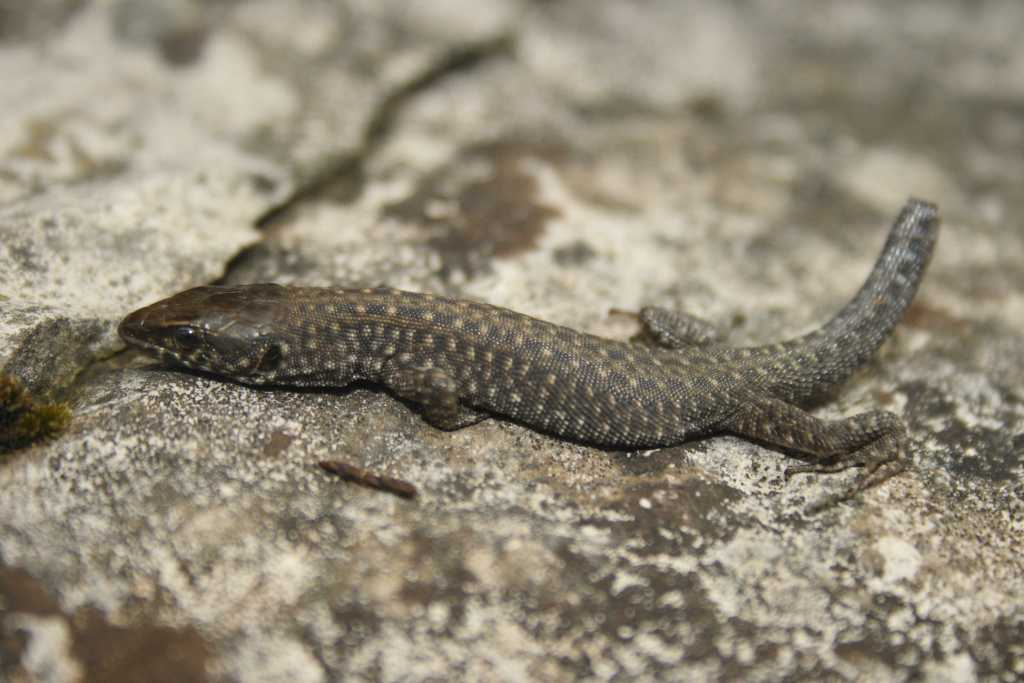
Gaige's Tropical Night Lizard (Lepidophyma gaigeae) in Mexico.

Lepidophyma gaigeae, also known commonly as Gaige's tropical night lizard and la lagartija nocturna de Gaige in Mexican Spanish, is a small species of lizard in the family Xantusiidae. The species is native to eastern Mexico.

== Etymology ==
The specific name, gaigeae, is in honor of American herpetologist Helen Beulah Thompson Gaige.

== Geographic range ==
L. gaigeae is native to the Sierra Madre Oriental of northern Querétaro state and adjacent northwestern Hidalgo state, between 1,800 and 2,200 m (5,900 and 7,200 ft) elevation.

== Habitat ==
The preferred natural habitat of L. gaigeae is rocky areas of forest or shrubland.

== Reproduction ==
L. gaigeae is viviparous. Litter size may be as small as one newborn.
