= Lepidophyma lowei =

Conservation status
- Data Deficient (IUCN 3.1)

Scientific classification
- Kingdom: Animalia
- Phylum: Chordata
- Class: Reptilia
- Order: Squamata
- Family: Xantusiidae
- Genus: Lepidophyma
- Species: L. lowei

Binomial name
- Lepidophyma lowei Bezy & Camarillo, 1997

Species of lizard

Lepidophyma lowei, also known commonly as Lowe's tropical night lizard and la lagartija nocturna de Lowe in Mexican Spanish, is a species of small lizard in the subfamily Lepidophyminae of the family Xantusiidae. The species is native to Mexico.

== Etymology ==
The specific name, lowei, is in honor of American herpetologist Charles Herbert Lowe

== Geographic range ==
Lepidophyma lowei is known only from San Bartolomé Zoogocho, in the municipality of San Bartolomé Zoogocho, in the Sierra Madre de Oaxaca, in the northern part of the Mexican state of Oaxaca, at 2,200 m (7,200 ft) elevation.

== Habitat ==
The preferred natural habitat of Lepidophyma lowei is forest.

== Reproduction ==
Lepidophyma lowei is viviparous. Litter size is four newborns.
