= Lepidophyma micropholis =

Conservation status
- Vulnerable (IUCN 3.1)

Scientific classification
- Kingdom: Animalia
- Phylum: Chordata
- Class: Reptilia
- Order: Squamata
- Suborder: Scinciformata
- Infraorder: Scincomorpha
- Family: Xantusiidae
- Genus: Lepidophyma
- Species: L. micropholis

Binomial name
- Lepidophyma micropholis Walker, 1955

Species of lizard

Lepidophyma micropholis, the cave tropical night lizard, is a species of lizard in the family Xantusiidae. It is a small lizard found in Mexico. It is native to caves in the Sierra del Abra Tanchipa, part of the Sierra Madre Oriental in eastern San Luis Potosí and adjacent southern Tamaulipas states.
