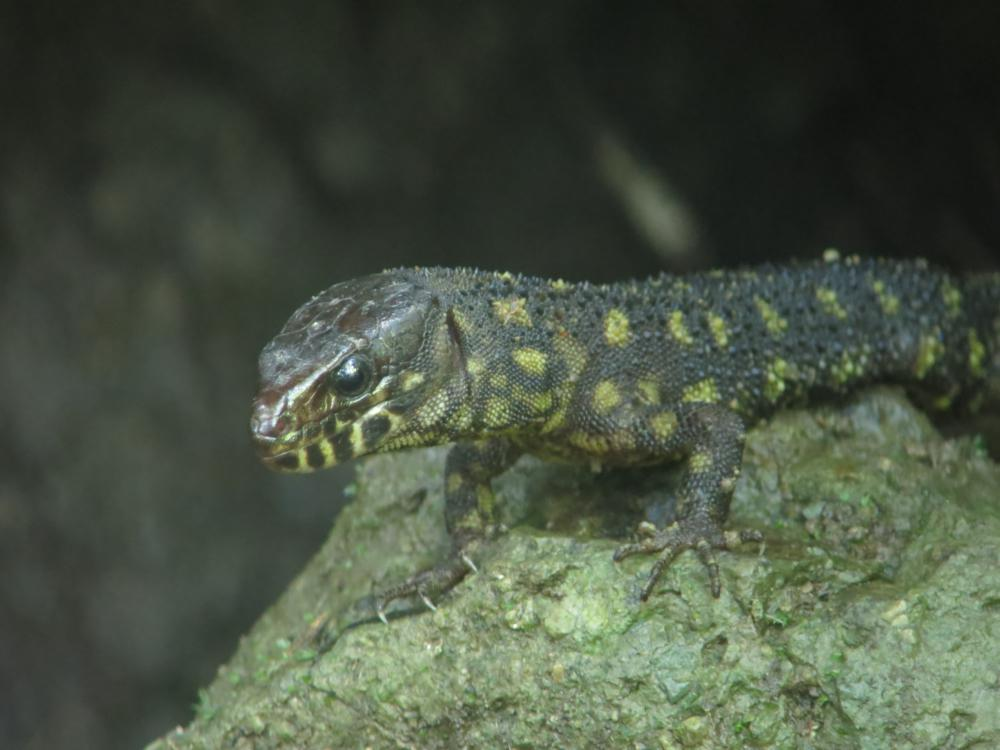

Conservation status
- Least Concern (IUCN 3.1)

Scientific classification
- Kingdom: Animalia
- Phylum: Chordata
- Class: Reptilia
- Order: Squamata
- Suborder: Scinciformata
- Infraorder: Scincomorpha
- Family: Xantusiidae
- Genus: Lepidophyma
- Species: L. reticulatum

Binomial name
- Lepidophyma reticulatum Taylor, 1955

= Lepidophyma reticulatum =

Species of lizard

Lepidophyma reticulatum, the Costa Rican tropical night lizard, is a species of lizard in the family Xantusiidae. It is a small lizard found in Costa Rica and Panama.
