= Lepidophyma pajapanensis =

Conservation status
- Least Concern (IUCN 3.1)

Scientific classification
- Kingdom: Animalia
- Phylum: Chordata
- Class: Reptilia
- Order: Squamata
- Suborder: Scinciformata
- Infraorder: Scincomorpha
- Family: Xantusiidae
- Genus: Lepidophyma
- Species: L. pajapanensis

Binomial name
- Lepidophyma pajapanensis Werler, 1957

Species of lizard

Lepidophyma pajapanensis, the Pajapan tropical night lizard, is a species of lizard in the family Xantusiidae. It is a small lizard found in Mexico. It is native to the coastal Sierra de los Tuxtlas, and to the southeast near Jesús Carranza on the Coatzacoalcos River in the Isthmus of Tehuantepec. It ranges from sea level up to 1,500 meters elevation.
