= Lepidophyma mayae =

Conservation status
- Near Threatened (IUCN 3.1)

Scientific classification
- Kingdom: Animalia
- Phylum: Chordata
- Class: Reptilia
- Order: Squamata
- Family: Xantusiidae
- Genus: Lepidophyma
- Species: L. mayae

Binomial name
- Lepidophyma mayae Bezy, 1973

Species of lizard

Lepidophyma mayae, also known commonly as the Mayan tropical night lizard and el escorpión nocturno maya in New World Spanish, is a small species of lizard in the family Xantusiidae. The species is native to Middle America.

== Etymology ==
The specific name, mayae, is in honor of the Maya, an indigenous people of the Yucatán Peninsula.

== Geographic distribution ==
Lepidophyma mayae is found in Belize, Guatemala, Honduras, and southern Mexico.

== Habitat ==
The preferred natural habitat of Lepidophyma mayae is forest, at altitudes of 100–800 m (330–2,620 ft).

== Behavior ==
Lepidophyma mayae is nocturnal, to which its common names refer.

== Reproduction ==
Lepidophyma mayae is ovoviviparous.
