= Lepidophyma smithii =

Conservation status
- Least Concern (IUCN 3.1)

Scientific classification
- Kingdom: Animalia
- Phylum: Chordata
- Class: Reptilia
- Order: Squamata
- Suborder: Scinciformata
- Infraorder: Scincomorpha
- Family: Xantusiidae
- Genus: Lepidophyma
- Species: L. smithii

Binomial name
- Lepidophyma smithii Bocourt, 1876

Species of lizard

Lepidophyma smithii, Smith's tropical night lizard, is a species of lizard in the family Xantusiidae. It is a small lizard found in Mexico, Guatemala, and El Salvador. They live in small caves with scarce levels of food and nutrients. Due to their habitat, Lepidophyma smithii is rather elusive. Smith's tropical night lizard is an omnivore, with a diet consisting of mostly fig tree fruit and vegetation, and insects. These lizards confine their movement to remain within the shelter of their caves, and do not emerge in during the day or night. All adult L.smithii are approximately 25 grams, but males have a slightly larger body size, wider heads and tails, and longer snouts, when compared to their female counterparts. Lepidophyma smithii reside in close quarters to other Lepidophyma species, often living via parapatric speciation.

== Reproduction ==
Xantusiidae are viviparous with internal syngamy. The Lepidophyma genus has had three separate occurrences in which they have evolved obligate parthenogenesis without hybridization. Lepidophyma smithii is the only known species with this genus to reproduce through regular facultative parthenogenesis. The female tropical night lizards are able to simultaneously reproduce parthenogenetically and sexually within the same clutch. Female Lepidophyma smithii carry out regular facultative parthenogenesis, even when in excess supply of sperm. The male and female offspring of these clutches are both viable and fertile.
