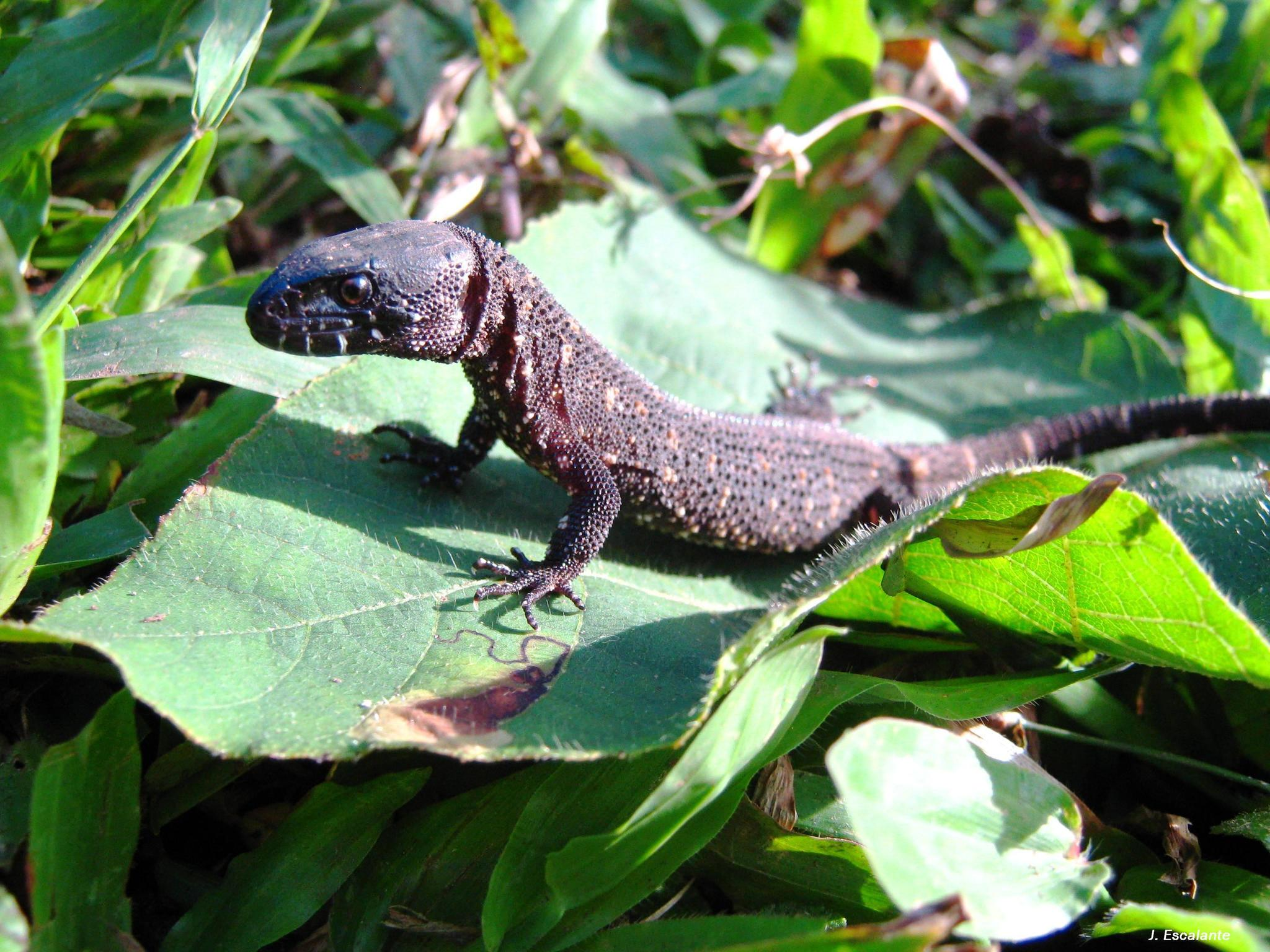

Conservation status
- Data Deficient (IUCN 3.1)

Scientific classification
- Kingdom: Animalia
- Phylum: Chordata
- Class: Reptilia
- Order: Squamata
- Suborder: Scinciformata
- Infraorder: Scincomorpha
- Family: Xantusiidae
- Genus: Lepidophyma
- Species: L. tuxtlae

Binomial name
- Lepidophyma tuxtlae Werler & Shannon, 1957

= Lepidophyma tuxtlae =

Species of lizard

Lepidophyma tuxtlae, the Tuxtla tropical night lizard, is a species of lizard in the family Xantusiidae. It is a small lizard found in Mexico. It is native to the Sierra de los Tuxtlas in coastal Veracruz and south and west into northern Oaxaca, southern Veracruz, and northern Chiapas. It is found from 150 to 1,500 meters elevation.
