= Lepidophyma ramirezi =

Scientific classification
- Kingdom: Animalia
- Phylum: Chordata
- Class: Reptilia
- Order: Squamata
- Family: Xantusiidae
- Genus: Lepidophyma
- Species: L. ramirezi

Binomial name
- Lepidophyma ramirezi Lara-Tufiño, Daniel, & Nieto-Montes de Oca, 2022

Species of lizard

Lepidophyma ramirezi is a species of lizard in the family Xantusiidae. It is a small lizard found in Mexico.
