= Lepidophyma lineri =

Conservation status
- Data Deficient (IUCN 3.1)

Scientific classification
- Kingdom: Animalia
- Phylum: Chordata
- Class: Reptilia
- Order: Squamata
- Family: Xantusiidae
- Genus: Lepidophyma
- Species: L. lineri

Binomial name
- Lepidophyma lineri H.M. Smith, 1973

Synonyms
- Lepidophyma flavimaculatum lineri H.M. Smith, 1973

Species of lizard

Lepidophyma lineri, also known commonly as Liner's tropical night lizard and la lagartija nocturna de Liner in Mexican Spanish, is a species of lizard in the subfamily Lepidophyminae of the family Xantusiidae. The species is native to southern Mexico.

== Etymology ==
The specific name, lineri, is in honor of American herpetologist Ernest A. Liner.

== Geographic range ==
L. lineri is native to the Sierra de Miahuatlán, a sub-range of the Sierra Madre del Sur in south-central Oaxaca, Mexico.

== Habitat ==
The preferred natural habitat of L. lineri is unknown because all specimens have been collected from coffee plantations.

== Reproduction ==
L. lineri is ovoviviparous.
