= Lepidophyma zongolica =

Scientific classification
- Domain: Eukaryota
- Kingdom: Animalia
- Phylum: Chordata
- Class: Reptilia
- Order: Squamata
- Family: Xantusiidae
- Genus: Lepidophyma
- Species: L. zongolica

Binomial name
- Lepidophyma zongolica Garcia-Vazquez, Canseco-Marquez, & Aguilar-Lopez, 2010

Species of lizard

Lepidophyma zongolica is a species of lizard in the family Xantusiidae. It is a small lizard found in Mexico.
