= Lepidophyma lusca =

Scientific classification
- Domain: Eukaryota
- Kingdom: Animalia
- Phylum: Chordata
- Class: Reptilia
- Order: Squamata
- Family: Xantusiidae
- Genus: Lepidophyma
- Species: L. lusca

Binomial name
- Lepidophyma lusca Arenas-Moreno, Munoz-Nolasco, Bautista del Moral, Rodriguez-Miranda, Dominguez-Guerrero, & Mendez de la Cruz, 2021

Species of lizard

Lepidophyma lusca is a species of lizard in the family Xantusiidae. It is a small lizard found in Mexico.
