= Lepidophyma tarascae =

Conservation status
- Data Deficient (IUCN 3.1)

Scientific classification
- Kingdom: Animalia
- Phylum: Chordata
- Class: Reptilia
- Order: Squamata
- Suborder: Scinciformata
- Infraorder: Scincomorpha
- Family: Xantusiidae
- Genus: Lepidophyma
- Species: L. tarascae

Binomial name
- Lepidophyma tarascae Bezy, Webb, & Alvarez, 1982

Species of lizard

Lepidophyma tarascae, the Tarascan tropical night lizard, is a species of lizard in the family Xantusiidae. It is a small lizard found in Mexico. It is currently known from two widely-separated locations in the State of Michoacán – near Playa Mexiquillo on the Pacific coast, and inland to the north in the Sierra de Coalcomán, a northwestern sub-range of the Sierra Madre del Sur. It inhabits forests and rocky areas.
