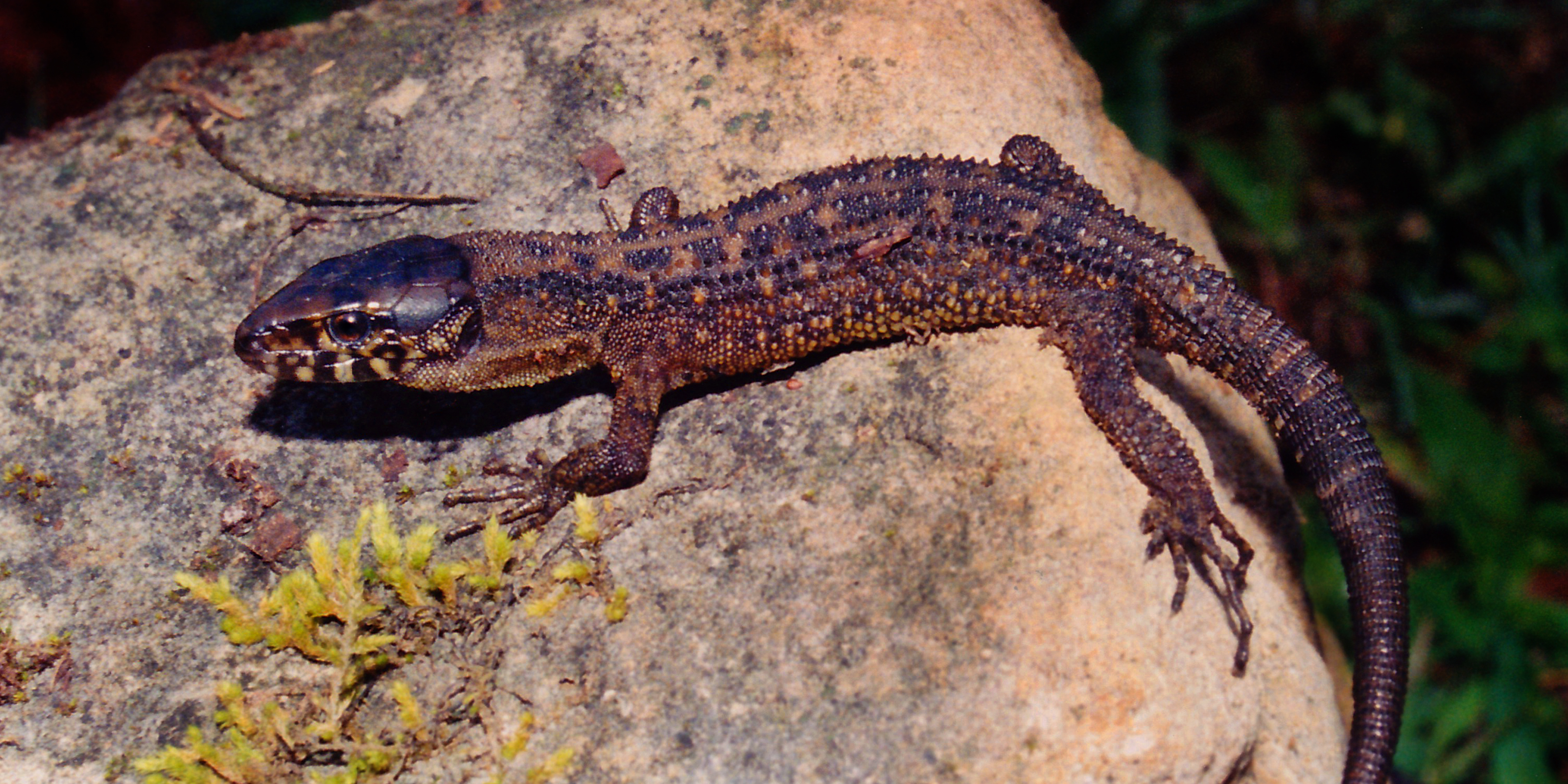

Conservation status
- Least Concern (IUCN 3.1)

Scientific classification
- Kingdom: Animalia
- Phylum: Chordata
- Class: Reptilia
- Order: Squamata
- Suborder: Scinciformata
- Infraorder: Scincomorpha
- Family: Xantusiidae
- Genus: Lepidophyma
- Species: L. sylvaticum

Binomial name
- Lepidophyma sylvaticum Taylor, 1939

= Lepidophyma sylvaticum =

Species of lizard

Lepidophyma sylvaticum, the Madrean tropical night lizard, is a species of lizard in the family Xantusiidae. It is a small lizard found in Mexico.
