= Lepidophyma lipetzi =

Conservation status
- Endangered (IUCN 3.1)

Scientific classification
- Kingdom: Animalia
- Phylum: Chordata
- Class: Reptilia
- Order: Squamata
- Family: Xantusiidae
- Genus: Lepidophyma
- Species: L. lipetzi

Binomial name
- Lepidophyma lipetzi H.M. Smith & Álvarez del Toro, 1977

Species of lizard

Lepidophyma lipetzi, also known commonly as Lipetz's tropical night lizard and la lagartija nocturna del Ocote in Mexican Spanish, is a species of lizard in the family Xantusiidae. It is a small lizard which is native to Mexico.

== Etymology ==
The specific name, lipetzi, is in honor of American biochemist Milton L. Lipetz.

== Geographic range ==
L. lipetzi is endemic to the Mexican state of Chiapas.

== Habitat ==
The preferred natural habitat of L. lipetzi is forest, at altitudes around 600 m (2,000 ft).

== Reproduction ==
L. lipetzi is ovoviviparous.
