= Lepidophyma jasonjonesi =

Scientific classification
- Kingdom: Animalia
- Phylum: Chordata
- Class: Reptilia
- Order: Squamata
- Family: Xantusiidae
- Genus: Lepidophyma
- Species: L. jasonjonesi

Binomial name
- Lepidophyma jasonjonesi Grünwald, Reyes-Velasco, Ahumada-Carrillo, Montaño-Ruvalcaba, Franz-Chávez, La Forest, Ramírez-Chaparro, Terán-Juárez, & Borja-Jiménez, 2023

Species of lizard

Lepidophyma jasonjonesi, Jones's night lizard, is a species of lizard in the family Xantusiidae. It is a small lizard found in Mexico.

== Taxonomy ==
Lepidophyma jasonjonesi was formally described in 2021 based on an adult male specimen collected from near Jaumave in the municipality of Victoria in Tamaulipas, Mexico. The species is named after Jason Michael Jones, an American-Mexican herpetologist who collected the type series of the new species. The species has the English common name Jones' night lizard and the Spanish common name Lagartija Nocturna de Jones.

== Description ==
The adult male holotype has a yellowish-cream dorsum with an unmarked pale yellowish-cream stripe down mid-dorsal region. There is black reticulation on the lateral portions of dorsum and flanks, with pale yellow highlights forming indistinct occelli. The head is chocolate brown dorsally with a greenish tinge on the frontonasals, prefrontals, and frontoparietals. The interparietal, occipitals and supratemporals are chocolate brown, while the upper labials are yellow. There is a dark brown irregular loreal stripe which runs from the tip of the snout to the lower posterior edge of the occipitals. The tail is pale gray with black blotches. The head is yellowish-cream ventrally with brown spots. The venter is white with grey spots on throat and tail. The iris is brass-copper colored. Other individuals vary slightly in the amount and shape of the dark dorsal blotches and pale yellow dorsal ocelli.

== Distribution and habitat ==
Lepidophyma jasonjonesi is known from semi-arid tropical deciduous forest on the lower leeward slopes of the Sierra Madre Oriental between Ciudad Victoria and Jaumave, Tamaulipas. The thorn scrub vegetation of the tropical deciduous forest in the Jaumave Valley grows to a low height. The species is known with certainty only from an elevation of 1005 m. Lepidophyma from Gomez Farías in Tamaulipas and San Roque in Nuevo León may also represent this species, but this identification is not confirmed.
