= Lepidophyma chicoasensis =

Conservation status
- Data Deficient (IUCN 3.1)

Scientific classification
- Kingdom: Animalia
- Phylum: Chordata
- Class: Reptilia
- Order: Squamata
- Suborder: Scinciformata
- Infraorder: Scincomorpha
- Family: Xantusiidae
- Genus: Lepidophyma
- Species: L. chicoasensis

Binomial name
- Lepidophyma chicoasensis Alvarez & Valentin, 1988

Species of lizard

Lepidophyma chicoasensis, the Sumidero tropical night lizard, is a species of lizard in the family Xantusiidae. It is a small lizard found in Sumidero Canyon in Chiapas, Mexico, at 600 meters elevation.
