= Lepidophyma dontomasi =

Conservation status
- Data Deficient (IUCN 3.1)

Scientific classification
- Kingdom: Animalia
- Phylum: Chordata
- Class: Reptilia
- Order: Squamata
- Family: Xantusiidae
- Genus: Lepidophyma
- Species: L. dontomasi

Binomial name
- Lepidophyma dontomasi (H.M. Smith, 1942)

Synonyms
- Gaigeia dontomasi H.M. Smith, 1942; Lepidophyma (Gaigeia) dontomasoi (H.M. Smith, 1942)

Species of lizard

Lepidophyma dontomasi, also known commonly as MacDougall's tropical night lizard and la lagartija nocturna de MacDougall in Mexican Spanish, is a small species of lizard in the family Xantusiidae. The species is endemic to Mexico.

== Etymology ==
The specific name, dontomasi, is in honor of the collector of the holotype, naturalist Thomas Baillie MacDougall, who was called Don Tomás by the local Mexicans.

== Geographic range ==
Lepidophyma dontomasi is known only from the type locality on Cerro Lachiguiri in the Mexican state of Oaxaca, where it was collected at 2,200 m (7,200 ft) elevation. However, it may be more widespread.

== Habitat ==
The preferred natural habitats of Lepidophyma dontomasi are pine forest and grassland.

== Reproduction ==
Lepidophyma dontomasi is ovoviviparous.
