= Lepidophyma radula =

Conservation status
- Data Deficient (IUCN 3.1)

Scientific classification
- Kingdom: Animalia
- Phylum: Chordata
- Class: Reptilia
- Order: Squamata
- Suborder: Scinciformata
- Infraorder: Scincomorpha
- Family: Xantusiidae
- Genus: Lepidophyma
- Species: L. radula

Binomial name
- Lepidophyma radula Smith, 1942

Species of lizard

Lepidophyma radula, the Yautepec tropical night lizard, is a species of lizard in the family Xantusiidae. It is a small lizard found in Mexico. It is known from only from two locations in the Valley of Oaxaca in central southern and central Oaxaca state – San Jose Manteca, five km from San Carlos Yautepec, and on the road between Mitla and Ayutla. It inhabits shrubland between 1,750 and 1,800 meters elevation.
