= Lepidophyma inagoi =

Scientific classification
- Domain: Eukaryota
- Kingdom: Animalia
- Phylum: Chordata
- Class: Reptilia
- Order: Squamata
- Family: Xantusiidae
- Genus: Lepidophyma
- Species: L. inagoi

Binomial name
- Lepidophyma inagoi Palacios-Aguilar, Santos-Bibiano, & Flores-Villela, 2018

Species of lizard

Lepidophyma inagoi is a species of lizard in the family Xantusiidae. It is a small lizard found in Mexico.
