= Lepidophyma cuicateca =

Scientific classification
- Kingdom: Animalia
- Phylum: Chordata
- Class: Reptilia
- Order: Squamata
- Family: Xantusiidae
- Genus: Lepidophyma
- Species: L. cuicateca

Binomial name
- Lepidophyma cuicateca Canseco-Márquez, Gutiérrez-Mayén, & Mendoza-Hernandez, 2008

Species of lizard

Lepidophyma cuicateca, the Sunidero tropical night lizard, is a species of lizard in the family Xantusiidae. It is a small lizard found in Santa María Texcatitlán, Oaxaca, Mexico at 1180 meters elevation.
