= Lepidophyma occulor =

Conservation status
- Least Concern (IUCN 3.1)

Scientific classification
- Kingdom: Animalia
- Phylum: Chordata
- Class: Reptilia
- Order: Squamata
- Family: Xantusiidae
- Genus: Lepidophyma
- Species: L. occulor

Binomial name
- Lepidophyma occulor Smith, 1942

Species of lizard

Lepidophyma occulor, the Japlan tropical night lizard, is a species of lizard in the family Xantusiidae. It is a small lizard found in Mexico. This species is native to the Valle de Jalpan in the Sierra Madre Oriental of northern Querétaro and adjacent San Luis Potosí states, from 900 to 1,400 meters elevation.
