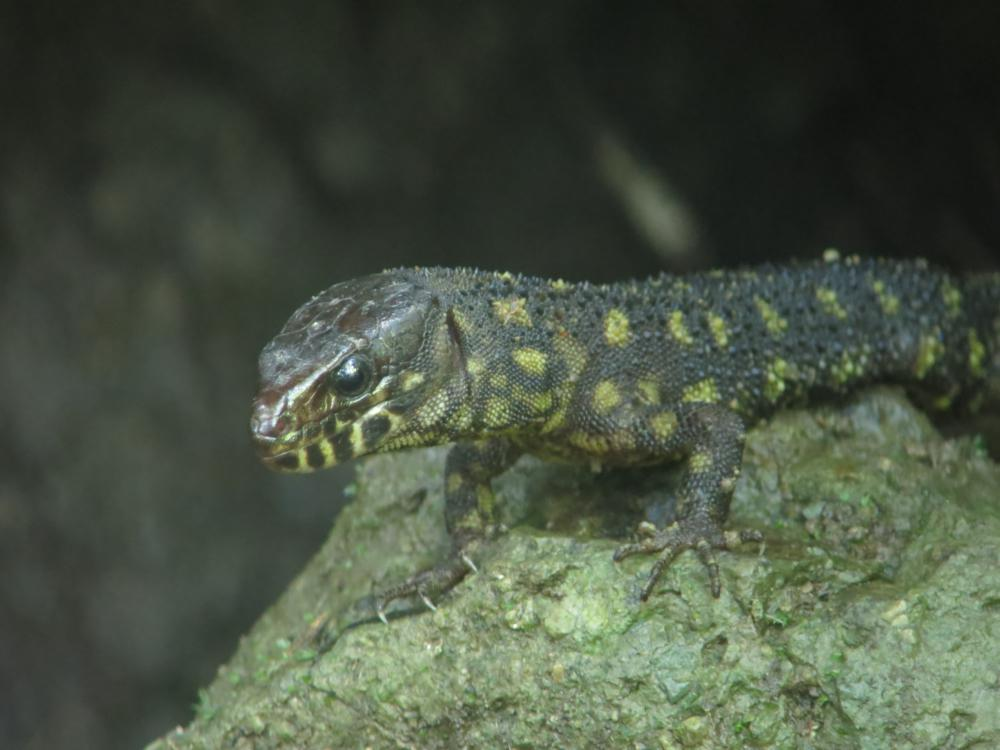
- Lepidophyma reticulatum

Scientific classification
- Kingdom: Animalia
- Phylum: Chordata
- Class: Reptilia
- Order: Squamata
- Family: Xantusiidae
- Genus: Lepidophyma; A.H.A. Duméril, 1851

Species
- 23, see text.

= Lepidophyma =

Genus of lizards

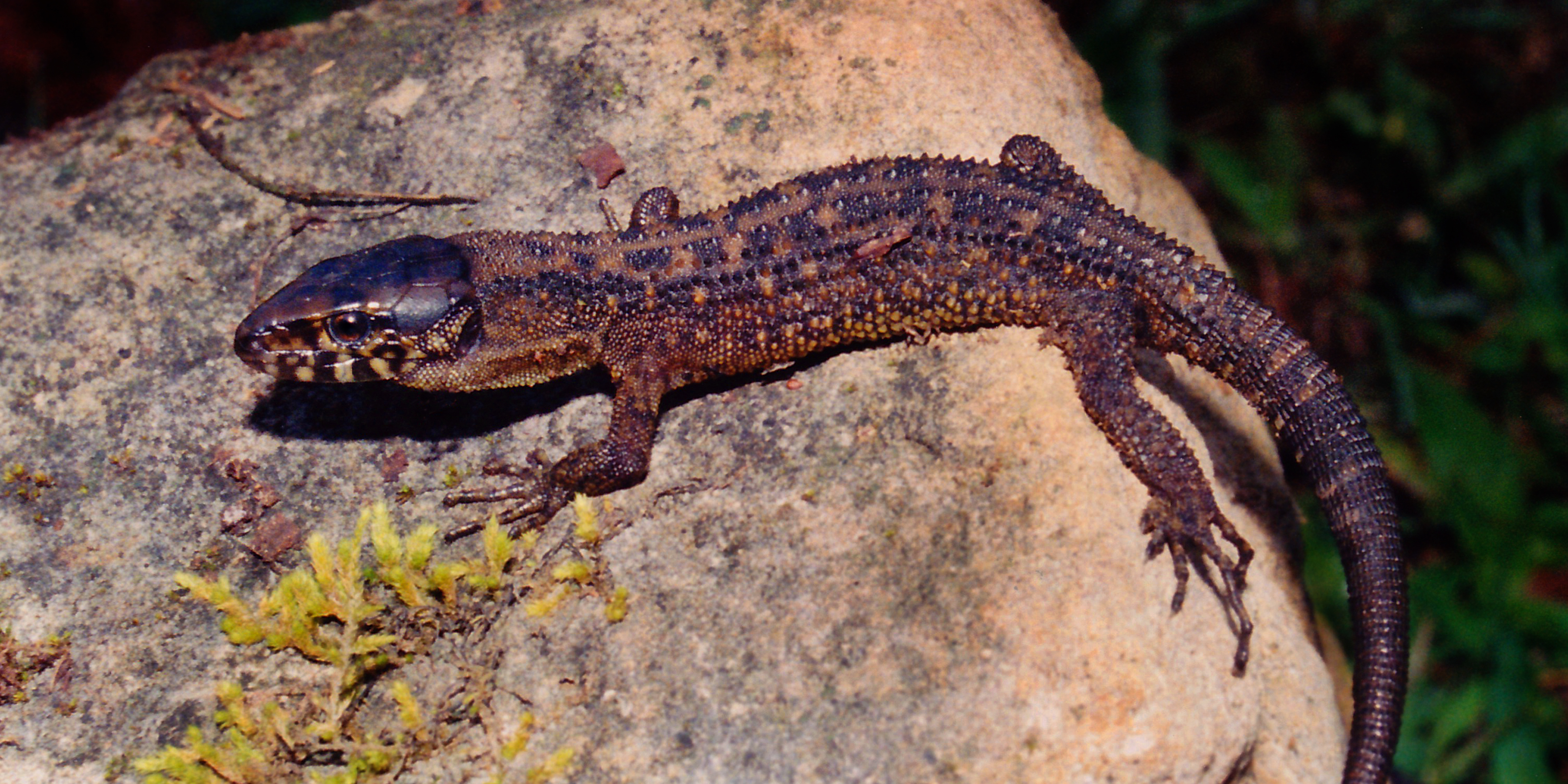
Madrean tropical night lizard (Lepidophyma sylvaticum) El Cielo Biosphere Reserve, municipality of Gómez Farías, Tamaulipas, Mexico (24 May 2005).

Lepidophyma is a genus of lizards, commonly called tropical night lizards. The genus Lepidophyma (Greek for "warty scales") is one of three genera of night lizards (family Xantusiidae), which are a group of viviparous (live-bearing) lizards. There are 20 species of tropical night lizards in the genus Lepidophyma, making it the most populous night lizard genus. Species of the genus Lepidophyma are distributed throughout Central America, found anywhere from central Mexico to Panama, depending on the particular species. Tropical night lizards, particularly the yellow-spotted species, are sometimes called Central American bark lizards by pet dealers and owners.

== Species ==
The following 23 species are recognized as being valid.

- Lepidophyma chicoasensis Álvarez & Valentín, 1988 – Sumidero tropical night lizard
- Lepidophyma cuicateca Canseco-Márquez et al., 2008 – Sunidero tropical night lizard
- Lepidophyma dontomasi (H.M. Smith, 1942) – MacDougall's tropical night lizard
- Lepidophyma flavimaculatum A.H.A. Duméril, 1851 – Yellow-spotted tropical night lizard
- Lepidophyma gaigeae Mosauer, 1936 – Gaige's tropical night lizard
- Lepidophyma inagoi Palacios-Aguilar, Santos-Bibiano & Flores-Villela, 2018
- Lepidophyma jasonjonesi Grünwald, Reyes-Velasco, Ahumada-Carrillo, Montaño-Ruvalcaba, Franz-Chávez, La Forest, Ramírez-Chaparro, Terán-Juárez & Borja-Jiménez, 2023
- Lepidophyma lineri H.M. Smith, 1973 – Liner's tropical night lizard
- Lepidophyma lipetzi H.M. Smith & Álvarez del Toro, 1977– Lipetz's tropical night lizard
- Lepidophyma lowei Bezy & Camarillo, 1997 – Lowe's tropical night lizard
- Lepidophyma lusca Arenas-Moreno, Muñoz-Nolasco, Bautista-Del Moral, Rodríguez-Miranda, Domínguez-Guerrero & Méndez-de la Cruz, 2021
- Lepidophyma mayae Bezy, 1973 – Mayan tropical night lizard
- Lepidophyma micropholis Walker, 1955 – cave tropical night lizard
- Lepidophyma occulor H.M. Smith, 1942 – Jalpan tropical night lizard
- Lepidophyma pajapanensis Werler, 1957 – Pajapan tropical night lizard
- Lepidophyma radula (H.M. Smith, 1942) – Yautepec tropical night lizard
- Lepidophyma ramirezi Lara-Tufiño & Nieto-Montes de Oca, 2022
- Lepidophyma reticulatum Taylor, 1955 – Costa Rican tropical night lizard
- Lepidophyma smithii Bocourt, 1876 – (Andrew) Smith's tropical night lizard
- Lepidophyma sylvaticum Taylor, 1939 – Madrean tropical night lizard
- Lepidophyma tarascae Bezy, Webb & Álvarez, 1982 – Tarascan tropical night lizard
- Lepidophyma tuxtlae Werler & Shannon, 1957 – Tuxtla tropical night lizard
- Lepidophyma zongolica García-Vázquez, Canseco-Márquez & Aguilar-López, 2010

Nota bene: A binomial authority in parentheses indicates that the species was originally described in a genus other than Lepidophyma.
