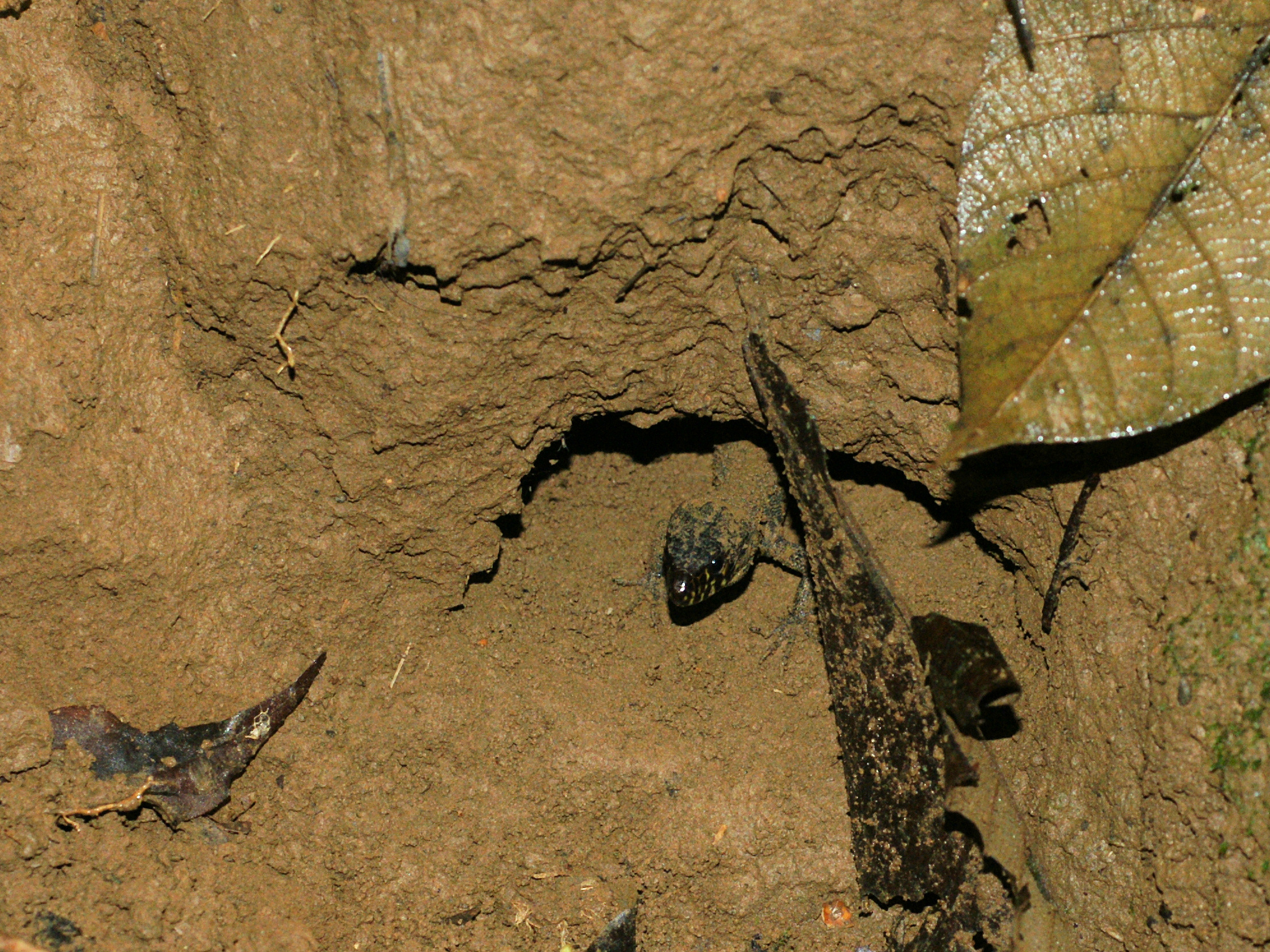

Conservation status
- Least Concern (IUCN 3.1)

Scientific classification
- Kingdom: Animalia
- Phylum: Chordata
- Class: Reptilia
- Order: Squamata
- Family: Xantusiidae
- Genus: Lepidophyma
- Species: L. flavimaculatum

Binomial name
- Lepidophyma flavimaculatum A.H.A. Duméril, 1851

Synonyms
- Lepidophyma flavimaculatum A.H.A. Duméril, 1851; Poriodogaster grayii A. Smith in Gray, 1863; Lepidophyma flavomaculatum A.H.A. Duméril & Bocourt, 1878; Lepidophyma flavimaculatum obscurum Barbour, 1924; Lepidophyma tehuanae H.M. Smith, 1942; Lepidophyma flavimaculatum tenebrarum Walker, 1955; Lepidophyma anomalum Taylor, 1955; Lepidophyma ophiophthalmum Taylor, 1955; Lepidophyma flavimaculata — Liner, 1994

= Yellow-spotted tropical night lizard =

Species of lizard

The yellow-spotted tropical night lizard or yellow-spotted night lizard (Lepidophyma flavimaculatum) is a species of night lizard (family Xantusiidae). The species is distributed from central Mexico, through Central America, south to Panama. It includes two subspecies.

== Subspecies ==
Two subspecies are recognized as being valid, including the nominotypical subspecies.

- Lepidophyma flavimaculatum flavimaculatum A.H.A.Duméril, 1851
- Lepidophyma flavimaculatum ophiophthalmum Taylor, 1955

== Reproduction ==
L. flavimaculatum reproduces parthenogenetically. The female gives birth to live, fully developed young lizards. Before birth the egg cells are not fertilized.

== Habitat and ecology ==
L. flavimaculatum is a secretive, terrestrial and nocturnal lizard of tropical wet and moist forests, at altitudes from sea level to 1,500 m (4,900 ft). Mostly found on the ground, it is occasionally found on tree trunks or beneath bark on standing trees. It feeds on small invertebrates.

== Fiction ==
The yellow-spotted night lizard is sometimes suggested to be the inspiration for the "yellow-spotted lizards" in the children's novel Holes by Louis Sachar. However, in the making of the movie adaptation of the novel, the filmmakers used bearded dragons and painted yellow spots on them, rather than using actual yellow-spotted night lizards. In both versions, the lizards are portrayed as animals that are aggressive toward humans and produce deadly venom, which is not true of either species.
