= Miguel Alvarez del Toro =

Mexican biologist (1917–1996)

Miguel Álvarez del Toro
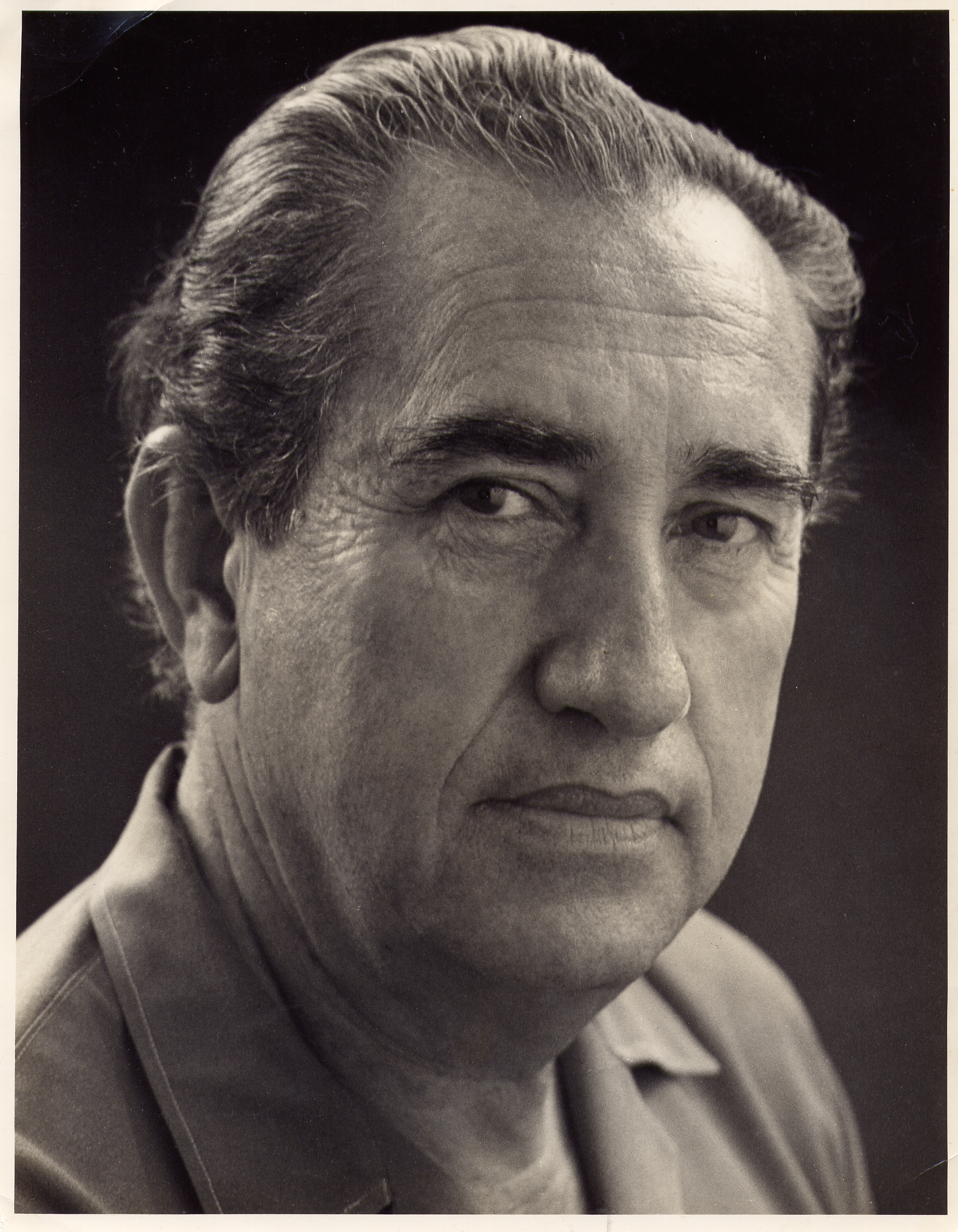
- Born: August 23, 1917; Colima, Mexico
- Died: August 2, 1996 (aged 78); Chiapas, Mexico
- Website: www.miguelalvarezdeltoro.com

Miguel Álvarez del Toro (Colima, Colima, August 23, 1917 – August 2, 1996, Tuxtla Gutiérrez, Chiapas, Mexico) was a scientist cataloged by the international community as the last naturalist of the 20th century, recognized for his outstanding work in the field of zoology and nature conservation.

His interest in nature, particularly that of the tropics, led him to accept a job offer in the state of Chiapas, where he stayed forever, doing a work that has become an obligatory reference for both biologists and conservationists.

Dr. Álvarez del Toro was self-taught. He never attended a university, but few naturalists have reached – by direct experience – the level of knowledge that he achieved in both animal and plant groups. Many of his observations remain the only information available on the natural history of certain species.

== Career ==
Miguel Álvarez del Toro was born in the state of Colima, in central western Mexico. He spent his childhood observing and collecting animals in that tropical region. When he was 15 years old, he and his family moved to Mexico City where he finished his secondary education. With a solid self-taught background, shortly after he began working as an independent zoologist.

In 1938 he collaborated as scientific collector of the Philadelphia Academy of Natural Sciences. A year later -and until 1942- he worked as a taxidermist technician at the Museo de la Flora y Fauna del Departamento Autónomo Forestal y de Caza y Pesca (Museum of Flora and Fauna of the Autonomous Department of Forestry and Hunting and Fishing) in Mexico City. Museum of which he was also deputy director.

In 1942, responding to a summons issued by Dr. Rafael Pascacio Gamboa, then governor of the state of Chiapas, Álvarez del Toro traveled to Tuxtla Gutiérrez where he held the position of taxidermist and general zoologist in the recently created Department of Tropical Nurseries and Museum of Natural History, there, he collaborated with Professor Eliseo Palacios Aguilera, its director.

Two years after his arrival in Chiapas, and following the premature death of Professor Palacios Aguilera in 1944, Álvarez del Toro held that position, and did so continuously for more than 50 years. Under his leadership, the Departmento became the Instituto de Historia Natural (today integrated into the Ministry of the Environment and Natural History).

In the same year (1944), Álvarez del Toro designed and built the first regional zoo; later, in 1949, the zoo moved to more suitable land in Parque Madero, also setting up a Museum of Natural History. In 1979 Animal Kingdom magazine designated it as one of the best zoos in Latin America, among other things, for the design of its enclosures, which, to date, try to be similar to a natural habitat. Another important characteristic that earned this nomination is the type of fauna, since Álvarez del Toro, a visionary man, considered more important to exhibit only regional fauna, thus helping to spread knowledge and appreciation for the biodiversity of Chiapas.

Between 1979 and 1980, he designed and coordinated the construction of the current zoo, located in the El Zapotal reserve. In recognition of his work, the Government of the State of Chiapas determined in 1980 that the Zoo be called "Zoológico Regional Miguel Alvarez del Toro" (now known, by its acronym, as ZOOMAT).

Under his leadership, the zoo had such important achievements as the first captive reproduction – worldwide – of Morelet's crocodile (Crocodylus moreletii) in 1969; at the national level, for the first time, the spectacled caiman (Caiman crocodilus) in 1966, and the American crocodile (Crocodylus acutus) in 1993; the Central American tapir (Tapirus bairdii), the greater grison (Galictis vittata), the viejo de monte (Eira barbara), as well as the longevity record of the harpy eagle (Harpia harpyja) (47 years).

== Books authored ==
He was the author of seven books and co-author of two more. His work is required reading for any researcher who intends to study Chiapas biodiversity. His main works are classic works in specialized libraries:

- Los animales silvestres de Chiapas. Ed. 1952
- Los reptiles de Chiapas. 1ª Ed. 1960, 2ª Ed. 1982
- Las aves de Chiapas. Ed. 1971
- Los crocodylia de México. Ed. 1974
- Los mamíferos de Chiapas. 1ª Ed. 1977, 2ª Ed. 1991
- ¡Así era Chiapas! 1ª Ed. 1985, 2ª Ed. 1990
- Las arañas de Chiapas. Ed. 1992
- Chiapas y su biodiversidad. Ed. 1993
- Comitán, la puerta del sur. Ed. 1994

== Scientific societies ==
- Sociedad Mexicana de Historia Natural: Socio Numerario (1939)
- American Ornithologists’ Union: Fellow (1947).
- Cooper Ornithological Society: Elective Member (1948).
- Herpetologists’ League: Fellow (1949).
- Turtle and Tortoise Internacional Society: Miembro Numerario (1969).
- International Cocodrilian Society: Miembro Numerario (1971).
- Member of the Species Survival Commission of International Union for the Conservation of Nature (IUCN), Sección Primates.
- Member of the Species Survival Commission of International Union for the Conservation of Nature, Sección Aves Rapaces.
- Miembro Honorario de la Sociedad Mexicana de Ornitología.
- Miembro Honorario de la Sociedad Mexicana de Zoología.

== New species and subspecies of reptiles described by Álvarez del Toro ==
- Abronia lythrochila
- Anolis parvicirculatus
- Anolis pygmaeus
- Anolis rodriguezi microlepis
- Anolis tyopidonotus spilochipsis
- Lepidophyma lipetzi

== Some recognitions and awards ==
His outstanding work in the field of zoology and nature conservation made Miguel Alvarez del Toro worthy of 30 awards and decorations, among which are:

- Chiapas Award, 1952, for his contribution to the knowledge of wild animals.
- Diploma of Recognition, 1977, by The American Association of Zoological Parks and Aquariums, for his work in favor of crocodile conservation.
- Medal of Merit in Ecology Alfonso L. Herrera 1985, by the Mexican Institute of Renewable Resources and the Mexican Ecological Federation.
- Recognition of Ecological Merit and Conservation, 1989, by the Chicago Zoological Society.
- Paul Getty Award for Nature Conservation, 1989, awarded by the World Wildlife Fund.
- 1992, selected by the United Nations Environment Program (UNEP), to be part of The Roll of Honor for Environmental Achievement, 1992.
- Doctor Honoris Causa by the Postgraduate College of the Autonomous University of Chapingo in 1992 and by the Autonomous University of Chiapas in 1993.
- Fifteen species and subspecies dedicated after his name by different scientists.

== Species and subspecies named after Álvarez del Toro ==
- Heloderma horridum alvarezi Martín del Campo & C.M. Bogert, 1956
- Pulex alvarezi Barrera, 1958
- Piranga bidentata alvarezi A.R. Phillips, 1975
- Lepidophima alvarezi H.M. Smith, 1975
- Dismorphia crisia alvarezi J. de la Maza & R. de la Maza, 1984
- Diaethria mixteca alvarezi J. de la Maza & R. de la Maza, 1985
- Troglopedetes toroi J.G. Palacios-Vargas, 1985
- Nototriton alvarezdeltoroi T.J. Papenfuss & D.B. Wake, 1987
- Coniophanes alvarezi J.A. Campbell, 1990
- Anolis alvarezdeltoroi A. Nieto Montes de Oca, 1996
- Ceratozamia alvarezii M. Pérez-Farrera, A.P. Vovides & C. Iglesias, 1996
- Epidendrum alvarezdeltoroi E. Hágsater, 2001
- Phyllophaga alvareztoroi M.A. Morón & M. Blas, 2006
- Plectropsyche alvarezi W. Wichard, M.M. Solórzano Kraemer & C. Luer, 2006
- Modisimus deltoroi A. Valdez-Mondragón & O.F. Francke, 2009

== Miscellaneous distinctions ==
- 1955 Guest of the US Department of State, to visit Universities, Museums and Zoos.
- 1959 Elected Member of the Committee for the Center for Tropical Studies, dependent on the University of Michigan, USA, scheduled for the State of Chiapas.
- 1964 Selected for the publication 'Who's Who in Mexico'.
- 1968 'America's Distinguished Person', designated by the Community Leaders of America publication.
- 1968 Special Guest of the Advisory Council of the Society for Zoological Education. Houston, Texas, USA.
- 1968 Principal Investigator of the project 'Controlled Reproduction of the Swamp Crocodile' appointed by the World Wildlife Fund, Switzerland, and the Mexican Institute of Renewable Natural Resources (IMERNAR).
- 1972 Member of the Committee for the Conservation of Birds, appointed by the American Ornithologists' Union.
- 1972 Collaborator-Field Researcher, appointed by Cornell University, Ithaca, New York, USA.
- 1975 Member of the technical council of the Southeast Ecological Research Center, San Cristóbal, L.C., Chiapas.
- 1977 Honorary Member of the Mexican Ornithological Society, A.C. Mexico.
- 1977 Recognition Diploma. 1st National Congress of Zoology. Chapingo, Edo. from Mexico.
- 1977 Honorary Member of the Association for Research and Protection of Birds of Prey and Institute of Falconology, A.C. Mexico.
- 1981 President of the Advisory Council for Wildlife of the Secretariat of Agriculture and Hydraulic Resources. Mexico.
- 1982 Member of the Technical Council for the Conservation of the 'Montes Azules' reserve, Chiapas.
- 1987 Recognition Diploma. Mexican Doctors for the Prevention of Nuclear War, A.C., Chiapas Chapter, and the Autonomous University of Chiapas.
- 1990 Appointed Honorary President for Life of the Natural History Society 'Soconusco, A.C.'. Tapachula, Chiapas.
- 1992 Diploma in recognition of his scientific work and his human quality. Commemoration of the 50 years of the Institute of Natural History and of Dr. Álvarez del Toro himself as its director.
- 1994 President of the Technical Council for the Conservation of the Biosphere Reserve 'El Triunfo', Chiapas.

== Consulting ==
- 1974 Principal Advisor of the FAUNAM Group, Faculty of Sciences, UNAM, Mexico, D. F.
- 1975 Advisor to the Herpetological Research Laboratory, Faculty of Sciences, UNAM.
- 1982 Advisor to the Fisheries Delegation for the construction of crocodile farms, Mexico.
- 1983 Advisor and Member of the Career Committee. Faculty of Biology. Institute of Sciences and Arts of Chiapas.
- 1984 Advisor to the Gladys Porter Zoo in Brownsville, Texas. USA.
- 1984 Adviser of the project 'Company for the Reproduction of Flora and Fauna' of the Government of Cuba.
- 1984 Advisor to the Undersecretariat of Ecology (Secretary of Ecology, Urban Development and Ecology) in the preparation of a legislative proposal related to wild Fauna and Flora. Mexico.

Technical Advisor to countless government agencies, non-governmental organizations, research centers, zoos, universities and wildlife breeding centers. Frequent adviser of various professional thesis works and research projects with topics related to Biology, Veterinary Medicine and natural resources in general.

== Published articles ==
- 1948 POLYGAMY AT GROOVE-BILLED ANI NEST. The Auk, Vol.65 (3): 449–450.
- 1948 THE WHITE PELICAN IN THE INTERIOR OF CHIAPAS, MEXICO. The Auk, Vol.65 (3): 457–458.
- 1949 STRIPED HORNED OWL IN SOUTHERN MEXICO.The Condor, Vol. 51 (5):232.
- 1949 A GUERRERO WHIP-POOR-WILL IMPALED BY AN INSECT. The condor, Vol. 51 (6) : 272.
- 1950 A SUMMER TANAGER, Piranga rubra, ANNIHILATES A WASP NEST. The Auk, Vol. 67 (3): 397.
- 1950 THE ENGLISH SPARROW IN CHIAPAS. The Condor, Vol. 52 (4): 166.
- 1952 CONTRIBUCIÓN A LA OOLOGÍA Y NIDOLOGÍA DE LAS AVES CHIAPANECAS. Revista Ateneo, Estado de Chiapas. 4: 11–22.
- 1952 NEW RECORDS OF BIRDS FROM CHIAPAS, MEXICO. The condor, Vol. 54 (2): 112–114.
- 1954 NOTES ON THE OCCURRENCE OF BIRDS IN CHIAPAS, MEXICO. The Condor, Vol. 56 (6): 365.
- 1955 FRIGATE BIRDS CROSSING THE ISTHMUS OF TEHUANTEPEC The Condor, Vol. 57 (1): 62.
- 1955 THE RUFESCENT MOURNER IN CHIAPAS, MEXICO. The Condor, Vol. 58 (2): 370–371.
- 1956 A HYBRID JAY FROM CHIAPAS, MEXICO. The Condor, Vol. 58 (2): 98–106, con F.A. Pitelka y R.K. Selander.
- 1956 NOTULAE HERPETOLOGICAE CHIAPASEAE I. Herpetologica, 12 (1): 3–17, con H. Smith.
- 1957 BLUE AND WHITE SWALLOW IN MEXICO. The Condor, 59: 268, con R.A. Paynter Jr.
- 1958 LISTA DE LAS ESPECIES DE AVES QUE HABITAN EN CHIAPAS. ENDÉMICAS, EMIGRANTES Y DE PASO. Revista de la Sociedad Mexicana de Historia Natural, 19 (1-4): 73–113.
- 1958 NOTULAE HERPETOLOGICAE CHIAPASEAE II. Herpetologica, 14 (1): 15–17, con H. Smith.
- 1959 REPTILES VENENOSOS DE CHIAPAS (FALSOS Y VERDADEROS). Revista ICACH (Instituto de Ciencias y Artes de Chiapas), Primera Época, 2: 10–22.
- 1959 ACUARIOS, TERRARIOS Y MUSEOS ESCOLARES. Revista ICACH, Primera Época, 3 : 42–68.
- 1960 EL CAÑÓN DEL SUMIDERO. IMPONENTE MARAVILLA NATURAL. Revista México Forestal, 34 (2): 22–24.
- 1961 NOTAS ZOOGEOGRÁFICAS DE CHIAPAS. VII Mesa Redonda, Sociedad Mexicana de Antropología. 21-37
- 1962 NOTULAE HERPETOLOGICAE CHIAPASEAE III. Herpetologica, 18 (2): 101–107, con H. Smith.
- 1963 MISCELÁNEA ORNITOLÓGICA. Revista ICACH, Primera Época, 10 :5-13.
- 1963 NOTULAE HERPETOLOGICAE CHIAPASEAE IV. Herpetologica, 19 (2): 100–105, con H. Smith.
- 1964 LA CRÍTICA SITUACIÓN DE LA FAUNA SILVESTRE DEL PAÍS. Memoria de la 1a. Convención Nacional de Caza. 45–51. · * * * 1965 THE NESTING OF THE BELTED FLYCATCHER. The Condor, 67 (4): 339–343.
- 1965 LAS AVES Y SUS RELACIONES CON EL HOMBRE. Revista ICACH, Primera Época, 15: 143–151.
- 1965 NOTAS SOBRE EL PAPAMOSCAS FAJADO. Revista ICACH, Primera Época, 15: 153–156.
- 1966 ALGUNAS AVES DE LAS CERCANÍAS DE TUXTLA GUTIÉRREZ (Ictéridas, Traúpidas y Fringílidas). Revista ICACH, Primera Época, 16/17: 57–86.
- 1966 A NOTE ON THE BREEDING OF BAIRD’S TAPIR (Tapirus bairdii), AT TUXTLA GUTIÉRREZ ZOO. International Zoo Yearbook, 6: 196–197.
- 1967 A NOTE ON THE BREEDING OF THE MEXICAN TREE PORCUPINE (Coendou mexicanus), AT TUXTLA GUTIÉRREZ ZOO. International Zoo Yearbook, 7: 118.
- 1968 AVES NOTABLES DE CHIAPAS Y SU CONSERVACIÓN. Las aves de México, IMERNAR, 27 -34.
- 1969 BREEDING THE SPECTACLED CAIMAN (Caiman crocodylus), AT TUXTLA GUTIERREZ ZOO. International Zoo Yearbook, 9: 35–36.
- 1970 NOTAS PARA LA BIOLOGÍA DEL PÁJARO CANTIL (Heliornis fulica). Revista ICACH, Segunda Época, 1: 7–13.
- 1970 RELACIÓN DE LAS AVES DE CHIAPAS. Revista Chiapas y sus Bosques. 10 Capítulos.1970-1971.
- 1971 EL BIEMPARADO O PÁJARO ESTACA (Nyctibius griseus mexicanus Nelson) Revista ICACH, Segunda Época, 2/3: 7–13. · * 1971 CENTRO DE REPOBLACIÓN DEL COCODRILO DE PANTANO (Cocodrylus moreletii). Revista ICACH, Segunda Época, 2/3: 15–17.
- 1971 ON THE BIOLOGY OF THE AMERICAN FINFOOT IN SOUTHERN MEXICO. The Living Bird, Cornell Laboratory of Ornithology. 79–88.
- 1972 EL ÚLTIMO TURQUITO. Revista ICACH, segunda Época, 5/6: 19–23.
- 1972 TRABAJOS PARA LA PROTECCIÓN DE LOS COCODRILIANOS EN CHIAPAS. Aspectos Internacionales de los Recursos Renovables de México. IMERNAR. 87–95.
- 1972 THE WWF PROJECT ON CROCODILES IN CHIAPAS. 37th North American Wildlife Conference. Wildlife Management Institute. 81–86.
- 1973 KROKODILE VOM AUSSTERBEN BEDROHT! UMSCHAU, 73 (20): 629–630.
- 1973 CONSTRUCCIÓN Y MANTENIMIENTO DE UN ACUARIO ESCOLAR. Secretaría de Educación Pública, Estado Chiapas. 20 pp.
- 1973 CÓMO HACER UNA COLECCIÓN DE INSECTOS. Dirección General de Educación Pública. Estado de Chiapas. No.7, 20 pp.
- 1975 EL ÚLTIMO TURQUITO. Revista Supervivencia, 1 (4): 41–42.
- 1975 PANORAMA ECOLÓGICO DE CHIAPAS. VIII Serie de Mesas Redondas ‘Chiapas y sus Recursos Naturales Renovables, IMERNAR. 3–19.
- 1976 DATOS BIOLÓGICOS DEL PAVÓN (Oreophasis derbianus G.R. Gray). Revista de la UNACH, 1 (1): 43–54.
- 1977 LA POCO CONOCIDA BIOLOGÍA DE LAS ARAÑAS. Revista de la Universidad Autónoma de Chiapas, 1 (13): 51–79.
- 1977 A NEW TROGLODYTIC LIZARD (Reptilia, Lacertilia, Xantusidae) FROM MEXICO. Journal of Herpetology, 11 (1): 37–40, con H. Smith.
- 1978 AVES NOTABLES DE CHIAPAS Y PROBLEMAS PARA LA CONSERVACIÓN DE LA AVIFAUNA LOCAL. Memorias del 1.er Simposio Nacional de Ornitología, U.A.CH. 12–22.
- 1979 RIVER TURTLE IN DANGER. Oryx, 15 (2): 170–173, con R.A.Mittermier y J.B. Inverson.
- 1979 THE LAST TURQUITO. Animal Kingdom, 82 (1): 23–25.
- 1980 A RANGE EXTENSION FOR Thecadactylus rapicaudus (Gekkonidae) IN MEXICO, AND NOTES ON TWO ANAKES FROM CHIAPAS.Bulletim, Maryland Herpetological Society, 16 (2): 49–51, con O. Sánchez Herrera.
- 1981 SITUACIÓN ACTUAL DE LOS CRÁCIDOS EN CHIAPAS.Memoria del Primer Simposio Internacional de la Familia Cracidae, UNAM, 89–91.

In addition to this material, Dr. Álvarez del Toro wrote a large number of dissemination, opinion and reflection articles about the natural resources of Chiapas and nature in general, published over the years in various media.

== Impact on zoology ==
Álvarez del Toro's work had an enormous impact on different branches of knowledge in zoology, at the same time sowing the seeds for the conservation of biodiversity in Chiapas:

=== Paleontology ===
Giving continuity to the work initiated by Professor Eliseo Palacios Aguilera in the 40s of the 20th century, Álvarez del Toro was in charge of safeguarding the fossil pieces of Chiapas and the Paleontological Collection. Currently, this Collection has national recognition, being the basis for the generation of paleobiological and geological knowledge of the state.

=== Entomology ===
In addition to starting the institute's Entomological Collection, in the mid-1970s he designed and installed the first vivarium of the zoo. In recognition of his contribution in this field, various specialists dedicated several species and subspecies of Arthropods to his name.

=== Herpetology ===
For herpetologists, his work Los Reptiles de Chiapas is still valid because it includes a large number of field observations. It is probably the most consulted and cited book on Mexican reptiles. Among many other contributions, his studies and actions to repopulate Morelet's crocodile (Crocodylus moreletii) possibly prevented the extinction of this species.

=== Ornithology ===
In the ornithological field, he made known the distribution of birds within the Chiapas geography and contributed with new records of species. Many of his works were published in recognized magazines worldwide, such as The Auk, The Condor, and The Living Bird. The most prestigious ornithological scientific societies recognized his trajectory, such is the case of the American Ornithologists' Union, the Cooper Ornithological Society and the Group of Specialists in Birds of Prey. In 1942, Álvarez del Toro began what is currently the largest ornithological collection in Southeast Mexico, with a representativeness of more than eighty percent of the species registered in Chiapas.

=== Mastozoology ===
Álvarez del Toro's investigations started in 1942 allowed the knowledge of the wild fauna of the state of Chiapas. His observations, reflected in his book Mammals of Chiapas, are the basis for mammalian studies in the region. His articles were published in recognized media such as the International Zoo Yearbook.

=== Conservation ===
Álvarez del Toro was a promoter of the protection of natural resources and the current existence of a system of protected areas in the state of Chiapas is due to him, such as the Selva El Ocote, El Triunfo, La Encrucijada, and La Sepultura Biosphere Reserves, and the Laguna Bélgica Educational Park. All are areas that shelter a representative sample of the fauna and flora of southern Mexico.

== Bibliography ==
- This was Chiapas: 42 years of adventures through mountains, jungles and roads in the State. Alvarez del Toro, Miguel. Autonomous University of Chiapas, 1985. PV 917.275 A473a
- Against the tide. The conservationists' crusade. Lane Simonian. 7th Chapter of the book The defense of the land of the jaguar: A history of conservation in Mexico. Mexico. SEMARNAP, National Institute of Ecology, Mexican Institute of Renewable Natural Resources. 1999. Original title: Defending the land of jaguar. A history of conservation in Mexico. ISBN 970-9000-09-8
- Sea and jungle roots. Curriculum vitae of a self-taught. 1996. Alvarez Rincon, Becky. Institute of Natural History. Chiapas. Mexico.
