= Deccansaurus =

Deccansaurus Temporal range: Latest Maastrichtian or earliest Danian, 66.5–65.5 Ma

Scientific classification
- Kingdom: Animalia
- Phylum: Chordata
- Class: Reptilia
- Order: Squamata
- Suborder: Scinciformata
- Infraorder: Scincomorpha
- Clade: Cordyliformes
- Genus: †Deccansaurus; Yadav et al, 2023
- Species: †D. paleoindicus

Binomial name
- †Deccansaurus paleoindicus Yadav, Bajpai, Maurya & Čerňanský, 2023

Extinct genus of scincomorphan (potentially a stem-cordyliform) lizard

Deccansaurus ("Deccan Traps lizard") is an extinct genus of scincomorphan (potentially a stem-cordyliform) lizard from the latest Cretaceous or earliest Paleocene of India. A single species is known, D. paleoindicus, represented by jaws and some osteoderm fragments from the Intertrappean Beds of the Dhar district in Madhya Pradesh.

The morphology of Deccansaurus suggests that it was a distant relative of modern skinks. In addition, it shares close similarities with members of the clade Cordyliformes (represented in the modern day by Cordylidae and Gerrhosauridae from mainland Africa and Madagascar), which would potentially mark the first occurrence of this group from the Indian subcontinent, which at the time was an island continent that had split from Madagascar several million years prior. An extinct cordyliform, Konkasaurus, is also known from the latest Cretaceous of Madagascar and shares many features with Deccansaurus, indicating close similarities between the faunas of India and Madagascar at the time and their shared ancestries.
