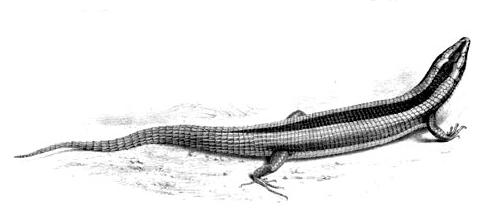

Conservation status
- Least Concern (IUCN 3.1)

Scientific classification
- Kingdom: Animalia
- Phylum: Chordata
- Class: Reptilia
- Order: Squamata
- Family: Gerrhosauridae
- Subfamily: Gerrhosaurinae
- Genus: Cordylosaurus; JE Gray, 1866
- Species: C. subtessellatus

Binomial name
- Cordylosaurus subtessellatus (Smith, 1844)

= Cordylosaurus =

Genus of lizards

Cordylosaurus (from Greek: κορδῡ́λη kordū́lē, 'club' and Greek: σαῦρος saûros, 'lizard') is a monotypic genus of lizards. Only a single species is assigned to this genus, the blue-black plated lizard (Cordylosaurus subtessellatus).
