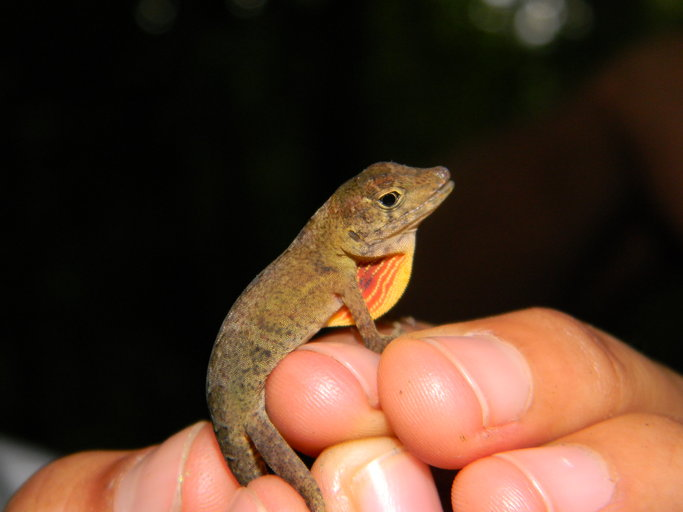

Conservation status
- Least Concern (IUCN 3.1)

Scientific classification
- Kingdom: Animalia
- Phylum: Chordata
- Class: Reptilia
- Order: Squamata
- Suborder: Iguania
- Family: Dactyloidae
- Genus: Anolis
- Species: A. parvicirculatus

Binomial name
- Anolis parvicirculatus Álvarez Del Toro & Smith, 1956

= Anolis parvicirculatus =

Species of lizard

Anolis parvicirculatus, the Berriozabal anole, is a species of lizard in the family Dactyloidae. The species is endemic to Chiapas, Mexico
