= Tepexisaurus =

Tepexisaurus Temporal range: Late Albian, 105 Ma

Scientific classification
- Kingdom: Animalia
- Phylum: Chordata
- Class: Reptilia
- Order: Squamata
- Suborder: Scinciformata
- Infraorder: Scincomorpha
- Genus: †Tepexisaurus; Reynoso & Callison, 2000

Type species
- †Tepexisaurus tepexii Reynoso & Callison, 2000

Extinct genus of reptiles

Tepexisaurus is a genus of extinct scincomorph lizard from the Early Cretaceous (late Albian) Tlayúa Formation, a Lagerstätte near Tepexi de Rodríguez, Central Mexico. One species, T. tepexii, is known. It was likely related to Scincidae (skinks), Cordylidae (girdled lizards), and Paramacellodus.

== Taxonomy ==
=== Discovery and formal description ===
The holotype of Tepexisaurus (IGM 7466), a well-preserved skeleton with a disarticulated head/neck and part of the tail missing, was recovered from the Tlayúa Quarry, near Tepexi de Rodríguez in Central Mexico. The specific locality in which it was discovered, represent the Middle Member of the Tlayúa Formation, a Lagerstätte rich in vertebrate fossils. The depositional environment of the Middle Member was a shallow lagoon fringed by a peneplain. On collection, the specimen was transported to the Geological Institute of the National Autonomous University of Mexico. In 2000, it was formally described by Victor-Hugo Reynoso and George Callison. The generic name derives from Tepexi de Rodríguez and the Latin saurus ("reptile").

=== Classification ===
In their paper describing Tepexisaurus, Reynoso and Callison performed several phylogenetic analyses. The strict consensus tree they recovered nested Tepexisaurus within Scincomorpha, as the sister taxon of a clade including Cordylidae, Paramacellodus, and Scincidae.

== Description ==
The skull length of Tepexisaurus' holotype, measured from the tip of the premaxilla to the occipital condyle, is 2.33 cm (0.92 in). The total length of the holotype, as preserved, is around 18.6 cm (7.3 in).

=== Anatomy ===
Tepexisaurus' snout measured about one-third of its total skull length. Due to the manner in which the holotype was preserved, many details of the skull are obscured. It is not known whether the premaxillae are fused. The parietal bones bear two crest-like processes that form part of the braincase wall. Their ends are swollen, similar to the condition seen in cordylids. Tepexisaurus' teeth are pleurodont, the typical condition among squamates, and closely resemble those of the European paramacellodid Becklesius. The teeth of the mandible were long and peg-like. The overall morphology of the mandible resembles extant xantusiids. Most of the presacral vertebral column (the cervical and dorsal vertebrae) is preserved, as are two sacral vertebrae, though only six caudal vertebrae are present. Soft tissue traces indicate that the rest of the tail was autotomised.

== Palaeoenvironment ==
The palaeoenvironment of the Tlayúa Formation, from which all specimens of Tepexisaurus are known, was likely a shallow coastal lagoon. It may have formed part of an island, though a connection to the North American mainland cannot be ruled out. A certain degree of influence from freshwater environments is indicated by the presence of fossils from crocodilians and freshwater turtles.
