= Catactegenys =

Catactegenys Temporal range: Late Cretaceous (late Campanian)

Scientific classification
- Kingdom: Animalia
- Phylum: Chordata
- Class: Reptilia
- Order: Squamata
- Family: Xantusiidae
- Genus: †Catactegenys; Nydam et al., 2013

Type species
- †Catactegenys solaster Nydam et al., 2013

Extinct genus of lizards

Catactegenys is an extinct genus of xantusiid lizard from the Late Cretaceous of Texas. It is thought that this genus is likely the direct ancestor of modern Desert Night Lizards found in the western desert regions of the United States. The type species, Catactegenys solaster, was named in 2013 from the late-Campanian-age Aguja Formation in Brewster County. The genus name means "breaker jaw" in Greek, a reference to its inferred ability to break hard shells with its jaws as an adaptation for a durophagous diet, and the species name means "lone star", a reference to Texas, the "lone star state". Catactegenys is known only from jaw bones, but the size of these bones indicates that it was larger than all other known xantusiids. The teeth are robust and heavily worn, suggesting that Catactegenys may have eaten hard-shelled molluscs, which are common in the Aguja Formation.
