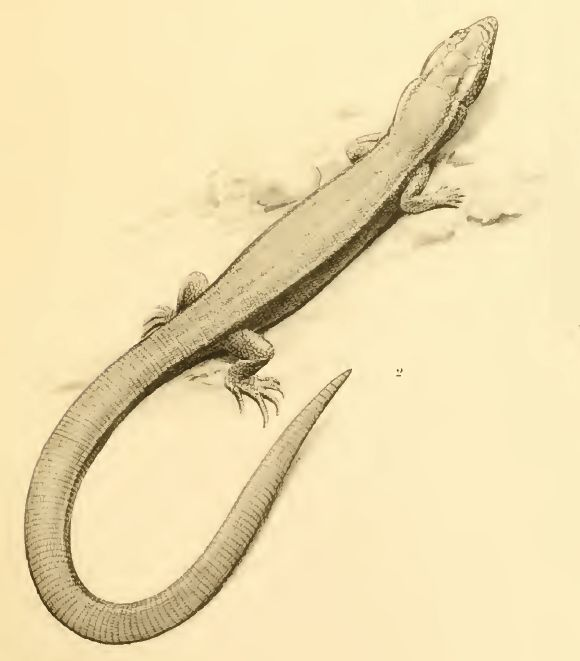

Scientific classification
- Kingdom: Animalia
- Phylum: Chordata
- Class: Reptilia
- Order: Squamata
- Family: Xantusiidae
- Subfamily: Cricosaurinae
- Genus: Cricosaura; Gundlach & Peters, 1863
- Species: C. typica

Binomial name
- Cricosaura typica Gundlach & Peters, 1863

= Cuban night lizard =

Species of lizard

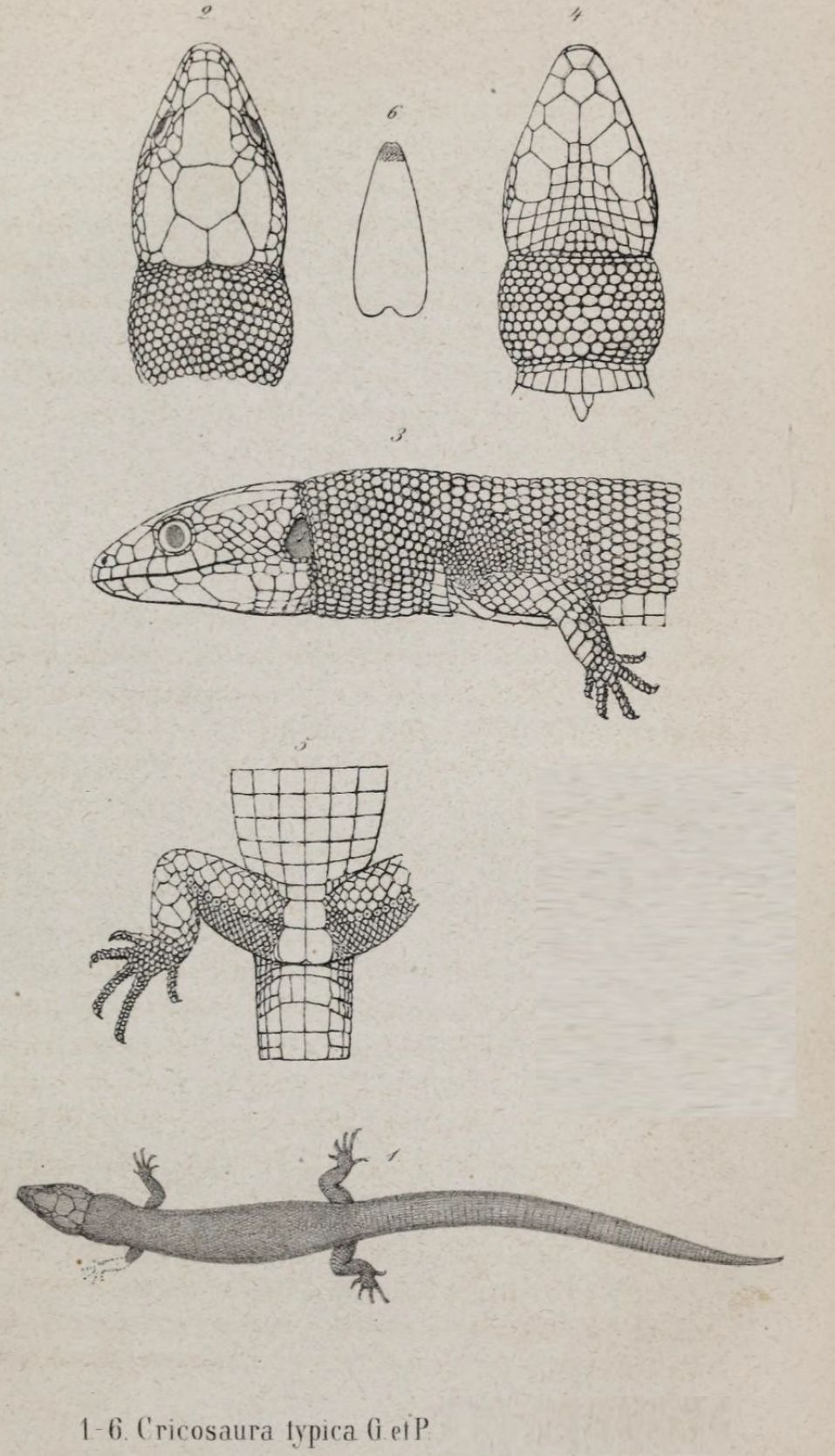
Cricosaura typica from Peters 1863

The Cuban night lizard (Cricosaura typica) is a night lizard (family Xantusiidae, subfamily Cricosaurinae) endemic to southern Cuba. It is the only member of the genus Cricosaura, one of three in the night lizard family.

== Etymology ==
Cricosaura is derived from the Greek words "krikos" and "saura" meaning "ring lizard", perhaps in reference to the rings of caudal scales. The name "typica", from the Greek word "typikos", means "typical".

== Description ==
The Cuban night lizard differs from the other night lizards in possessing two frontonasal scales, one frontal scale, no parietal scale, and a fourth finger with four phalanges. With a snout-vent length less than 4 cm it is the smallest of the night lizards.

== Distribution ==
Cricosaura typica lives exclusively in the west corner of the southernmost coast of Cuba in the Provinces of Granma and Santiago de Cuba up to 200 m altitude. Known localities for Granma Province include: Hoyo de la Campana, Cabo Cruz (type locality); Vereón; Monte Gordo; Playa Las Coloradas; Currín; Agua Fina; Bosque Castillo; Belic; Bajada al Pesquero de la Alegría; Pesquero de la Alegría; Alegría de Pío/Municipio Niquero; 2.4 km SE of Ojo del Toro; Caleta Media Luna; Punta de Piedra; Alto de Mareón; Marea del Portillo; Camarón Grande. In the Santiago de Cuba Province the species is known only from La Mula (southern slopes of Sierra Maestra) and Uvero (ca. 80 km west of Santiago de Cuba on route 20, easternmost record).

== Habitat and natural history ==
Cricosaura typica is a xerophilic species which hides under rocks, stones, logs, and debris in xeric forest and woods in microhabitats with at least some humidity. It is crepuscular and to some degree diurnal but lives very secretive. In their habitats it is quite common and can be easily collected during the day. In loose soil it progresses by snake-like wiggling and head movement. It feeds on insects (mainly ants), other small arthropods (Spiders, diplopods) and also on molluscs and gastropods.

Cricosaura typica is the only egg-laying species in the family Xantusiidae. At oviposition, mainly between April and June on Cuba, the white eggs are 9,4-10,7 mm long. Incubation time is up to 60 days. Hatchlings measure 15 mm from snout to vent. Longevity in captivity is reported up to 2 years 11 month.

== Conservation status ==
This species is listened in Red List Category Vulnerable B2a,b(iii) for Cuba. The main threat is the fragmentation and loss of habitat due to deforestation through human activities such as farming (minor crops), cutting down trees and setting fires. It is also threatened by the introduction of invasive alien animal species and adverse natural events. Although some of the populations of Cricosaura are situated in a protected area, the level of study and management are inadequate. The populations outside the boundaries of the protected area are the most threatened.
