= Litter (zoology) =

Multiple animal offspring from one gestation

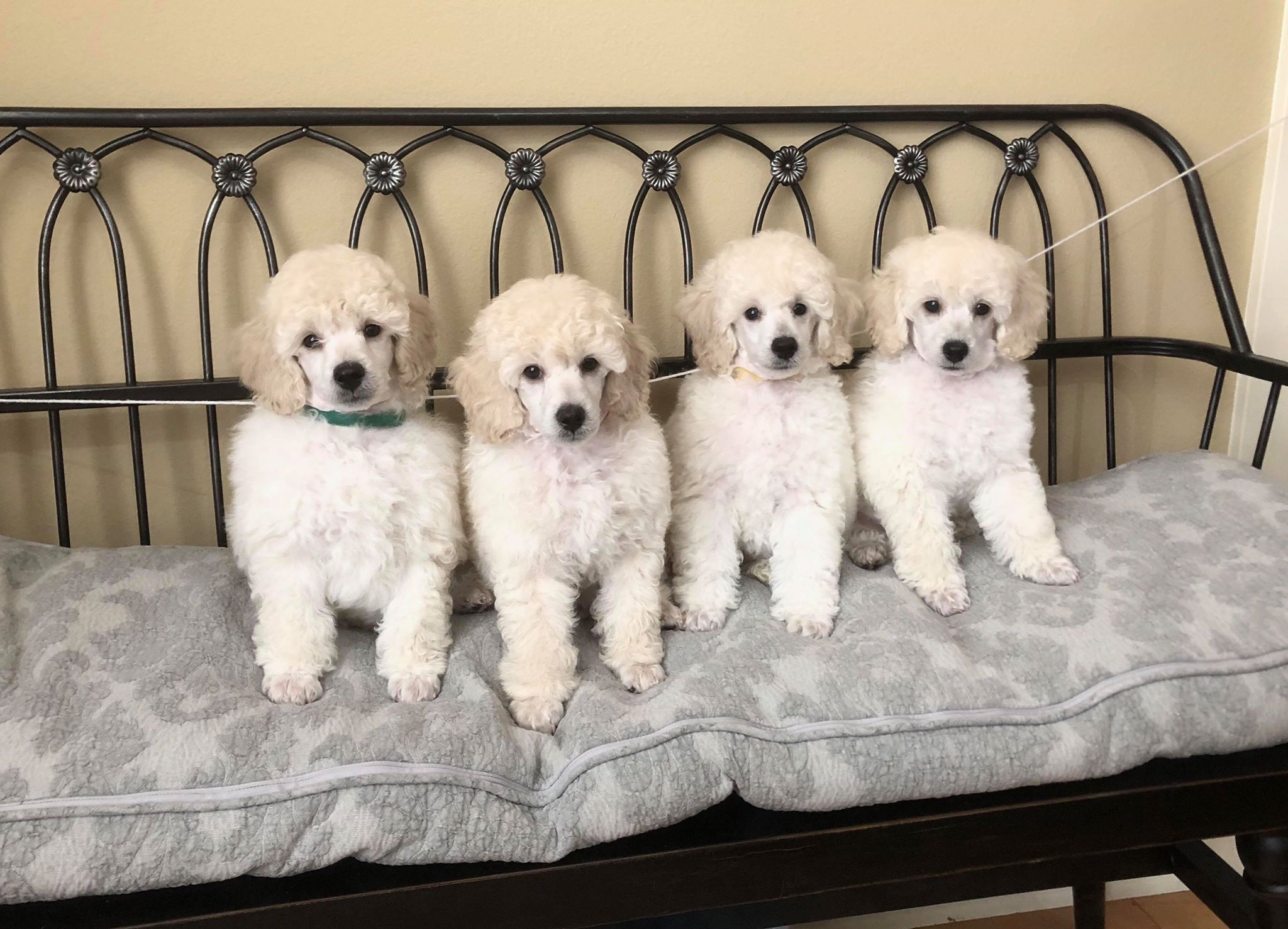
Puppy litter at 8 weeks old

A litter is the live birth of multiple offspring at one time in animals from the same mother and usually from one set of parents, particularly from three to eight offspring. The word is most often used for the offspring of mammals, but can be used for any animal that gives birth to multiple young. In comparison, a group of eggs and the offspring that hatch from them are frequently called a clutch, while young birds are often called a brood. Animals from the same litter are referred to as littermates.

== Litter size (typical count) ==
In most female mammals, the average litter size is about half the number of mammae. Presumably, this enables females to successfully nurse litters even if some mammae fail to produce milk. Breeding female naked mole-rats, however, can bear and successfully rear litters that are far more numerous than their mammae because young take turns nursing from the same mammary and breeding females and pups are fed and protected by colony mates, enabling queens to concentrate their reproductive efforts on gestation and lactation.

== Factors affecting litter size ==
Animals with shorter gestation periods typically produce larger litters of less developed young (altricial). In contrast, those with longer gestations generally have smaller litters of more developed offspring (precocial). Another factor that can affect litter size is the species of that particular animal. Smaller mammals tend to have larger litters, while larger mammals tend to have smaller litters. Animals that bear multiple young at once often have offspring born at a relatively early stage of development. There are some exceptions to the rule. Pigs are an exception because they do tend to have larger litter sizes and longer gestation periods. This is due to both genetics and selective breeding practices.

Species	Gestation (days)	Average litter
House mouse	19-21	6
Rabbit	28-35	7
Domestic cat	58-67	4
Domestic dog	58-68	5-6
Pig	115	10-14
Cow	283	1
Human	266-280	1

Multiple other biological and environmental factors influence litter size within and between species:

- Maternal body size: Larger individuals within a species typically produce larger litters
- Maternal age: Litter sizes often increase with age up to a point, then decline
- Nutrition: Better-fed mothers produce larger litters with higher survival rates
- Number of mammae: Average litter size often approximates half the number of teats

== Advantages of being born into a litter ==
Animals frequently display grouping behavior in herds, swarms, flocks, or colonies, and these multiple births derive similar advantages. A litter offers some protection from predation, not particularly to the individual young but to the parents' investment in breeding. With multiple young, predators could eat several, and others could still survive to reach maturity, but with only one offspring, its loss could mean a wasted breeding season. The other significant advantage is the chance for the healthiest young animals to be favored from a group. Rather than it being a conscious decision on the part of the parents, the fittest and strongest baby competes most successfully for food and space, leaving the weakest young, or runts, to die through lack of care.

== Maternal care and rejection ==
Not all offspring born in a litter receive equal care. Maternal rejection occurs across many species as a mechanism to optimize reproductive investment.

Common reasons for rejection include:

- Litter size exceeding the mother's capacity to nurse or care for all offspring
- The presence of runts or developmentally weak individuals
- Maternal stress, poor nutrition, or illness
- Inexperience in first-time mothers

In wild populations, rejected offspring rarely survive without intervention. The "runt" phenomenon is widespread in species with large litters, such as pigs and dogs, where the smallest individual may receive less access to milk and maternal attention.
