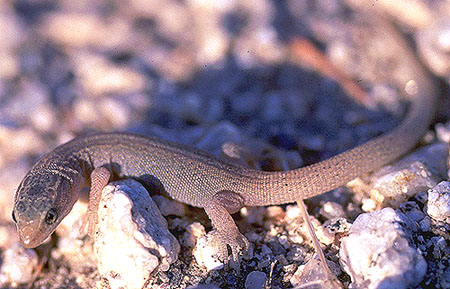
- Xantusia vigilis

Scientific classification
- Kingdom: Animalia
- Phylum: Chordata
- Class: Reptilia
- Order: Squamata
- Infraorder: Scincomorpha
- Family: Xantusiidae; Baird, 1858

Genera
- Cricosaura; Lepidophyma; Xantusia

= Night lizard =

Night lizard Temporal range: Campanian - Present 81.5–0 Ma

Family of lizards

Night lizards (family Xantusiidae) are a group of small scincomorph lizards native to North America, averaging from less than 4 cm (1.6 in) to over 12 cm (4.7 in) snout–vent length. Most species are viviparous (live-bearing), with the exception of those in the genus Cricosaura. The family has only three living genera, with approximately 34 living species. The genera are divided by geographic range: Xantusia in southwestern North America and Baja California, Cricosaura in Cuba, and Lepidophyma, the most populous night lizard genus, in Central America.

== Evolution ==
Fossil remains of true xantusiids are known since the Late Cretaceous. Three fossil genera are known: †Catactegenys Nydam et al., 2013 (Late Cretaceous of Texas, US), †Palaeoxantusia Hecht, 1956 (Early Eocene of western North America), and †Palepidophyma Smith & Gautier, 2013 (Early Eocene of Wyoming, US). All extant and fossil genera are known from North America, but the putative stem-group xantusiid †Retinosaurus Čerňanský et al., 2022 is known from Albian-aged amber from Myanmar, suggesting a potential Asian connection. Another likely stem-group xantusiid is †Tepexisaurus Reynoso & Callison, 2000 from the Early Cretaceous of Mexico.

Phylogenetic evidence has found that the crown group of xantusiids are uniquely ancient, with Cricosaura having diverged from the other two genera during the mid-Cretaceous. A reconstructed biogeography of the night lizards suggests that the Caribbean and Gulf of Mexico region was the ancestral home of the group, and that they have continuously inhabited this region since the Cretaceous. This region's immediate proximity to the impact site of the Chicxulub meteor makes night lizards unique among extant tetrapods as the only tetrapod crown group clade known to have inhabited this region at the time of impact and still survived the Cretaceous-Paleogene extinction event. These early night lizards are assumed to have been highly specialized and possessed low litter/clutch sizes, contrasting with prevailing assumptions that generalist species with a high amount of offspring were best suited to survive the extinction event.

== Biology ==
Night lizards were originally thought to be nocturnal because of their secretive lifestyle, but they are at least in some cases diurnal. Night lizards have evolved to live in very narrow environmental niches—"microhabitat specialization"—such as rock crevices or damp logs, and may spend their entire life under the same cover.

Physically, night lizards are characterized by relatively flat bodies and heads. Their heads are covered by large, smooth plates, while their bodies have rougher, granular skin. Their eyes, like those of snakes, are covered by immoveable, transparent membranes that function as eyelids. They feed on insects and sometimes plants.

Contrary to the reproductive strategies of most small lizards, night lizards tend to have very low reproductive rates, with several species giving birth to only one or two offspring, after a gestation period of about three months. They generally take several years to reach sexual maturity. However, the covert lifestyle of night lizards has contributed to a high life expectancy.
