= Parasaurillus =

Parasaurillus Temporal range: Berriasian

Scientific classification
- Kingdom: Animalia
- Phylum: Chordata
- Class: Reptilia
- Order: Squamata
- Infraorder: Scincomorpha
- Genus: †Parasaurillus; Evans & Searle, 2002
- Species: †P. pseudobtusus

Binomial name
- †Parasaurillus pseudobtusus Evans & Searle, 2002

Genus of lizards

Parasaurillus is a genus of extinct lizard from the Early Cretaceous of southern England. The type and only species is Parasaurillus pseudobtusus, named in 2002 by Susan E. Evans and Belinda Searle for extensive jaw and tooth material that has previously been classified as either Saurillus obtusus (from which the binomial was derived) or Pseudosaurillus from the Berriasian Lulworth Formation. The taxon was found in the Mammal Bed near the base of the formation alongside the other lizards Becklesius, Dorsetisaurus, Durotrigia, Paramacellodus, Pseudosaurillus, Parviraptor and Saurillus obtusus. It is likely closely related to Scincoidea, more so than other contemporary taxa.

- Squamata
  - Lacertoidea
    - Purbicella
    - Lacertidae
    - - Gymnophthalmidae
      - Teiidae
  - - Anguimorpha
    - - Becklesius
      - Paramacellodus
      - - Parasaurillus
        - - Cordyliformes
          - Scincidae
