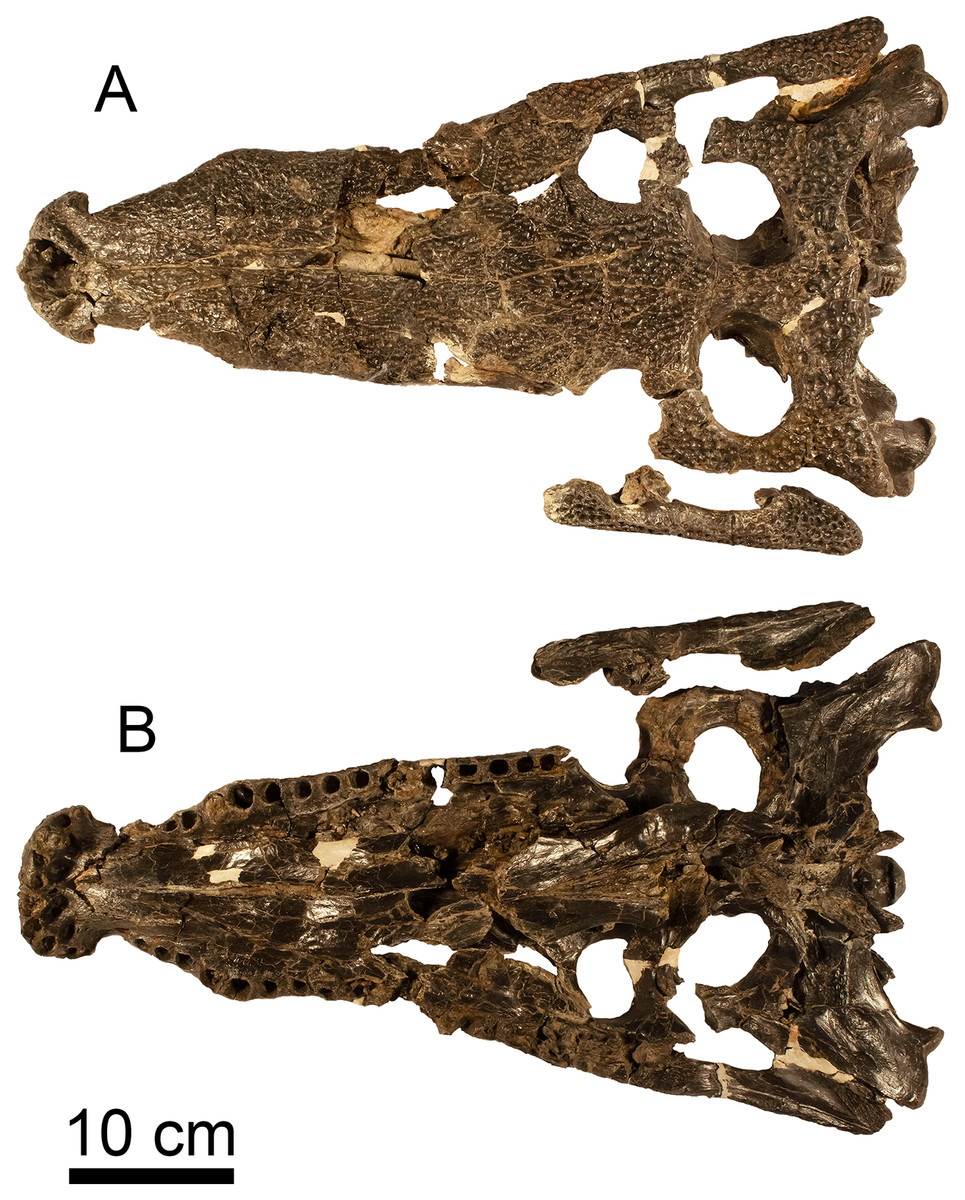
- The skull of Paarthurnax in dorsal and ventral view

Scientific classification
- Kingdom: Animalia
- Phylum: Chordata
- Class: Reptilia
- Clade: Pseudosuchia
- Clade: Crocodylomorpha
- Family: †Goniopholididae
- Genus: †Paarthurnax; Platt, Adams & Brochu, 2025
- Species: †P. holliensis

Binomial name
- †Paarthurnax holliensis Platt, Adams & Brochu, 2025

= Paarthurnax =

Paarthurnax Temporal range: Early Cretaceous, Aptian–Albian

Extinct genus of reptiles

Paarthurnax is an extinct genus of goniopholidid crocodyliform from the Early Cretaceous Holly Creek Formation of southwest Arkansas. It was described in 2025 on the basis of a nearly complete skull and named after the fictional dragon of the same name from the video game The Elder Scrolls V: Skyrim. Phylogenetic analysis places the genus in the family Goniopholididae, closely related to the Late Cretaceous Denazinosuchus. The results of this analysis suggests that members of this group were more widespread throughout Cretaceous North America than had been previously believed. The genus Paarthurnax is monotypic, meaning it only includes a single species: Paarthurnax holliensis.

== History and naming ==
The holotype skull of Paarthurnax, specimen TxVP 41881-1, was discovered during the 1970s at the Briar Site Locality of the Aptian to Albian Holly Creek Formation in southwest Arkansas. The skull was subsequently given to Dr. N. F. Williams of what is now the Arkansas Geological Survey before being occasionally discussed in various papers. It was briefly described in 1973, shared with Wann Langston Jr. in 1975 and at one point regarded as having affinities with goniopholidids. It was eventually tentatively referred to Paluxysuchus in 2021, though no thorough description of the material was provided until 2025 when the material was given the name Paarthurnax by Nathan C. Platt, Thomas L. Adams and Christopher A. Brochu.

Paarthurnax was named after a dragon of the same name from the video game The Elder Scrolls V: Skyrim, though no explanation for this inspiration is given by the type description of the genus. In the source material, Paarthurnax spells Ambition, Overlord, Cruelty in Dovahzul, a Constructed Language in The Elder Scrolls V: Skyrim. The specific name holliensis refers to the Holly Creek Formation, where the fossil material was discovered.

== Description ==
In its general shape and proportions the skull of Paarthurnax broadly resembles that of other goniopholidids and many modern semi-aquatic crocodilians, being roughly triangular in shape with a single naris and orbits that face upwards. The snout is flattened (platyrostral) and makes up about 65% of the total skull length.

The tip of the snout, formed by the paired premaxilla, is distinctly axe-shaped like in other goniopholidids thanks to the presence of prominent notches at the contact with the maxilla, functioning to receive an enlarged fourth dentary tooth as seen in today's crocodyloids. The snout tip is further described as deflecting downwards, essentially causing the premaxillary toothrow to be lower than the subsequent maxillary teeth. The external narial opening is entirely surrounded by the premaxillae with no contribution from the nasal bones and surrounded by a perinarial crest, an elevated rim that is at its widest and tallest around the sides of the opening and more subtle towards the back. Where the two premaxilla meet in front of the naris the holotype preserves a small dorsal projection and behind the naris the surface of the premaxillae along the midline suture is notably depressed and features a small fossa.

Looking at the maxilla from above shows a distinct outwards bulge around the position of the fourth and fifth maxillary teeth that gives the bone a slightly sinusoidal outline. Among the most notable features of the maxilla compared to other goniopholidids is the apparent absence of a distinct ovoid maxillary depression as seen in most members that traditionally make up the family. Instead a series of neurovascular foramina eventually leads to a narrow groove in the same position that would be occupied by the depression in other taxa. In addition to some pholidosaurids, in which a similar groove is seen extending onto the jugal bone, this feature is most similar to what has been observed in the latest Cretaceous goniopholidid Denazinosuchus as well as the paluxysuchine Deltasuchus. Given that both the classical goniopholidid maxillary depression and the groove of Cretaceous North American forms are restricted to the maxilla and located in the same general region it is hypothesized that the two structures are homologues.

The nasal bones stretch the dorsal-most surface of the snout from roughly the position of the maxillary bulge until their contact with the anterior process of the frontal, being both excluded from participating in the naris as well as ending well before the orbital margin. The paired bones begin as a narrow wedge inserted in-between the posterior processes of the premaxilla and grow gradually wider until being themselves bifurcated by the frontal. Towards the back of the skull the nasals come into contact with the lacrimal and the prefrontal bones, which form much of the anterior and lateral edges of the orbits. Through this, the prefrontal largely excludes the frontal from the orbital margin sans for a minuscule contribution on the skull table. The orbital margin is further characterized by an elevated rim that stretches over most of the prefrontal, continues onto the lacrimal and ends in a subtriangular lacrimal fossa. Though not preserved, Paarthurnax likely also possessed a palpebral, as evidenced by the fact that the prefrontal shows the articular surface for the bony eyebrow.

The dagger-shaped frontal bridges the rostrum and the skull table, forming a pointed anterior process that forms much of the space between the eye sockets, extends beyond the tips of the prefrontals and separates the posterior processes of the nasals. The frontal contributes little to the orbital margin itself, barely participating enough to just prevent the prefrontals from coming into contact with the postorbitals. The frontal houses a prominent interorbital crest that spans not only this central element but stretches across both prefrontals and much of the two lacrimals. The frontal's participating on the skull table consists of lateral processes that contact the postorbitals, its contribution to the two sub-rectangular or sub-ovoid and very large supratemporal fenestrae and the posterior extension that contacts the parietal. The postorbital bears two notable projections. The smaller of the two is located is located anteromedially on the intertemporal bar, a suble convex peg that extends into the posterior corner of the orbit. The anterior outer corner meanwhile features a much more pronounced and elongated process that extends forward and down, forming the lateral edge of the orbit, shielding its side and causing the eyesocket to be directed upward. Similar projections are seen in some other neosuchians, among them Sarcosuchus and the more closely related Paluxysuchus and Anteophthalmosuchus. The postorbital further contributes to the postorbital bar and overlaps the squamosal further back on the skull table. The squamosal ultimately forms the outer corners of the skull table, forming an elongated prong-like process that extends beyond the posterior edge of the parietal, which the squamosal contacts medially. The lateral face of the squamosal bears a shallow groove that extends forward onto the postorbital that serves as an attachment point for the upper ear-lid or earflap, a soft tissue structure also found in modern crocodiles. The parietal is the final bone to participate in the dorsal surface of the skull table, being wedged in-between the squamosals, the supratemporal fenestrae and the frontal. Both it and the squamosals overhang the occipital surface at the back of the skull and prevent the supraoccipital from being exposed on the skull table.

The jugal consists of three regions, the anterior, posterior and ascending processes. Both the anterior and posterior processes are of similar depth and contact the maxilla and quadratojugal respectively. The ascending process on the other hand is forming the lower portion of the postorbital bar, connecting with the descending process of the postorbital. The entire postorbital bar is inset relative to the remainder of the contributing bones and described as anteroposteriorly flattened. The posterior process forms the lower edge of the infratemporal fenestra until the posterolateral corner, where it connects with the quadratojugal. The quadratojugal is broadly divided into a lateral region which is ornamented like the adjacent jugal and an unornamented anterodorsal process that forms the back of the infratemporal fenestra and contacts both the quadrate and the bones of the skull table. It is unclear whether or not the quadratojugal formed a spine that protruded into the fenestra. The quadrate is robust and broad and forms the point of articulation for the lower jaw without help of the quadratojugal. It can be divided into a lateral and a medial hemicondyle, which are separated from each other by a sulgus.

=== Dentition ===
Paarthurnax would have possessed five teeth in either premaxilla and at least a further 14 maxillary teeth based on the more complete right half. Only three teeth are preserved themselves, with the count being otherwise based on the present alveoli. The teeth are conical with a circular cross section and a slight curvature inward. The teeth show distinct cutting edges medially and distally (the "front" and "back") an closely-spaced striations that run from near apex of each tooth to the base of the tooth crown.

While the lower jaw is unknown, some clues on the interaction between the dentition of the upper and lower jaw can be found in the anatomy of the upper jaw. Lingual to the premaxillary alveoli the bone clearly shows two pits that would have served as occlusal pits for the first two dentary teeth, one behind and between the first two premaxillary alveoli and another right behind the third alveolus, with the latter being shallower than the former. The enlarged pseudocanine of the lower jaw would have then slid into the prominent notch behind the premaxillary toothrow when the jaws were closed.

=== Osteoderms ===
A single partial osteoderm was associated with the holotype skull of Paarthurnax. The fragment is thought to be the anterolateral corner of a right paravertebral osteoderm, i.e. part of the central double row that runs along the back of Paarthurnax. The overall morphology is similar to that of other goniopholidids, pholidosaurids and armored thalattosuchians and features a heavily pitted surface and an incomplete spike-like process that would have helped articulate the bony plate with its predecessor.

=== Size ===
The skull of Paarthurnax measures approximately 530 mm (21 in) in length from the tip of the snout to the end of the occipital condyle. From this Platt, Adams and Brochu calculate a total body length of 3.975 m (13.04 ft).

== Phylogeny ==
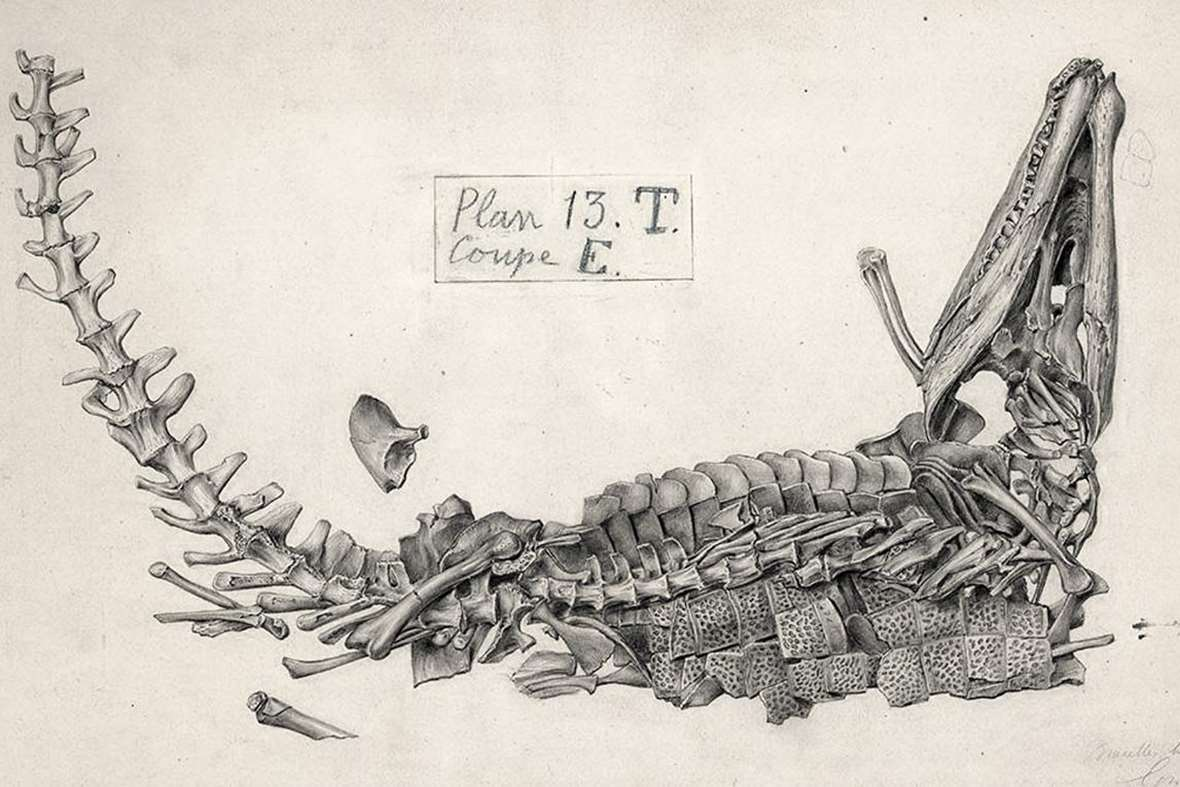
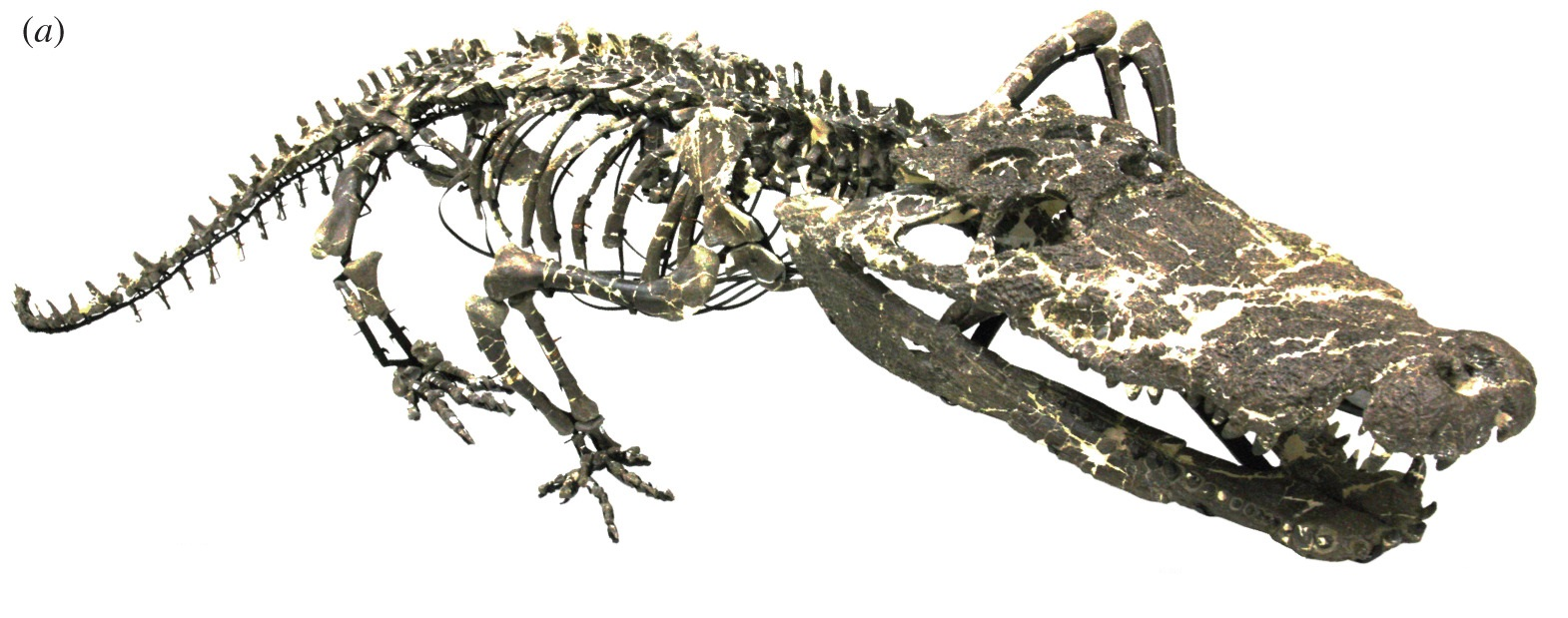
Paarthurnax and other Cretaceous American goniopholidids are thought to be more closely related to European species like Anteophthalmosuchus (top) than to Jurassic American genera like Amphicotylus (bottom).

Two phylogenetic analysis were conducted in the type description of Paarthurnax, one based on the matrix by Drumheller et al. (2021) and one based on the matrix of Wilberg et al. (2023). In both analysis Paarthurnax was recovered as a derived member of the family Goniopholididae, a branch of semi-aquatic neosuchians mostly known from North America and Europe. The internal topology of Goniopholididae between both results are similar as well, both featuring Paarthurnax as the sister taxon to the Maastrichtian Denazinosuchus. The sister taxon to this group is the European Anteophthalmosuchus and all three are furthermore related to Deltasuchus and Paluxysuchus (previously placed in the family Paluxysuchidae unrelated to goniopholidids). Despite the fact that all these forms, with the exception of Anteophthalmosuchus, are from the Cretaceous of North America, they are actually more closely related to European species rather than the older taxa from the Jurassic of North America.

- †Goniopholididae
  - †Calsoyasuchus
  - - †Sunosuchus
    - - - †Amphicotylus stovalli
        - - †Eutretauranosuchus
          - - †Amphicotylus gilmorei
            - †Amphicotylus lucasii
      - - †Goniopholis baryglyphaeus
        - - †Goniopholis simus
          - - †Goniopholis kiplingi
            - - †Hulkepholis
              - - - †Anteophthalmosuchus
                  - - †Paarthurnax
                    - †Denazinosuchus
                - - TxVP 42536-2
                  - †Deltasuchus
                  - †Paluxysuchus

- †Goniopholididae
  - †Siamosuchus
  - - - †Eutretauranosuchus
      - †Amphicotylus
    - - †Goniopholis simus
      - †Goniopholis baryglyphaeus
      - - †Goniopholis kiplingi
        - - †Hulkepholis
          - - - †Deltasuchus
              - †Paluxysuchus
            - - †Anteophthalmosuchus
              - - †Denazinosuchus
                - †Paarthurnax

== Paleogeography ==
Both phylogenetic analysis conducted as part of the type description suggest that Cretaceous goniopholidids such as Paarthurnax are deeply nested among European goniopholidids. While it is unclear where the family first evolved, with both North America and Asia being possible points of origin, the overall topology recovered in the analysis suggest that goniopholidids dispersed between Europe and North America multiple time. This is evident in goniopholidids being prominent parts of the Jurassic fauna of North America while also inhabiting Late Jurassic to Early Cretaceous Europe. From there the group appears to have dispersed back into North America during the Cretaceous and even crossed the Western Interior Seaway at some point in time.

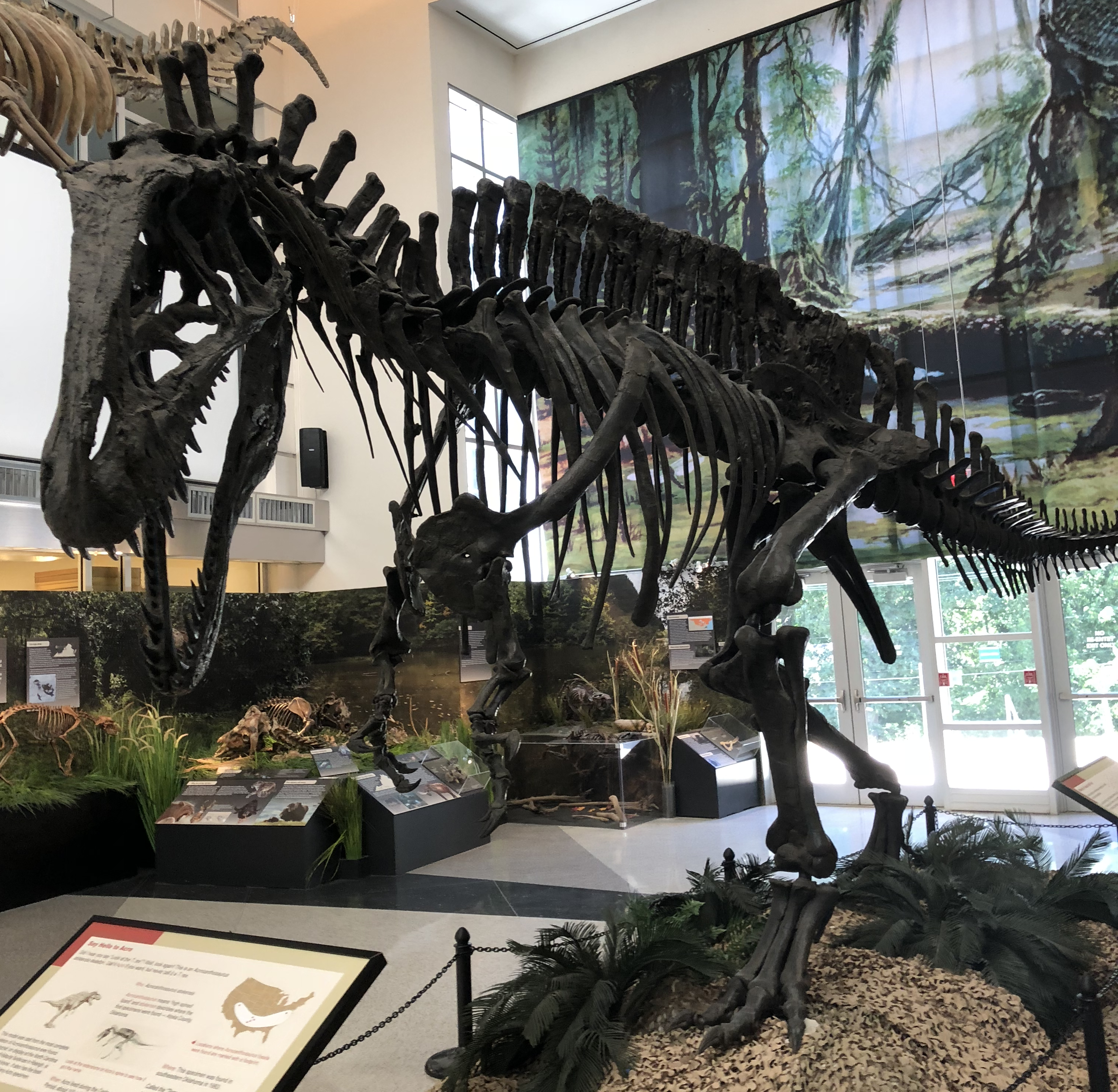
Paarthurnax would have shared its environment with a variety of dinosaurs including the large theropod Acrocanthosaurus.

== Paleoenvironment ==
The fossil remains of Paarthurnax are known from the Holly Creek Formation of the Trinity Group in Arkansas, which is interpreted to be Aptian to Albian in age. The Holly Creek Formation is known to preserve a mix of aquatic, semi-aquatic and marine fauna as well as plant fossils such as Classostrobus arkansensis and Pseudofrenelopsis parceramosa. The fish fauna features fresh- to brackish-water chondrichthyans like the hybodont Lonchidion and an indetermiate lamniform as well as actinopterygians, including the pycnodont Anomoeodus, remains referred to Lepidotes and a bowfin relative. In addition to Paarthurnax the semi-aquatic fauna would have featured other potential neosuchians known from fragmentary remains, solemydid and softshell turtles and frogs. The scincomorph lizard Sciroseps is also known from the formation. Numerous dinosaur remains have also been reported from the Holly Creek Formation, such as Sauroposeidon, Acrocanthosaurus, Deinonychus, Richardoestesia and a nodosaurid ankylosaur. Finally, mammals of the formation include spalacolestines and alticonodontines.

Overall the Holly Creek formation is likened in its fauna to other roughly contemporary strata such as the Antlers Formation, Cedar Mountain Formation, Cloverly Formation and others, which has been interpreted to suggest a broadly-distributed but low diversity fauna being found across North America during the intervall. Though Holly Creek differs in the absence of ornithopods and the presence of a nodosaur, which is otherwise rare within the Trinity Group. Regardless of fauna, the Formation has been interpreted as representing a freshwater lagoon within a coastal plain that was at times subject to marine incursions.
