= Pseudosaurillus =

Pseudosaurillus Temporal range: Berriasian

Scientific classification
- Domain: Eukaryota
- Kingdom: Animalia
- Phylum: Chordata
- Class: Reptilia
- Order: Squamata
- Infraorder: Scincomorpha
- Family: †Paramacellodidae
- Genus: †Pseudosaurillus; Hoffstetter, 1967
- Species: †P. becklesi

Binomial name
- †Pseudosaurillus becklesi Hoffstetter, 1967

Genus of lizards

Pseudosaurillus is a genus of extinct lizard from the Early Cretaceous of southern England. The type and only species is Pseudosaurillus becklesi, named in 1967 by R. Hoffstetter limited jaw and tooth material from the Berriasian Lulworth Formation. A large amount of material that was additionally referred to Saurillus by Hoffstetter was reassigned to Pseudosaurillus in 1983 by Estes, but this has since been reclassified within its own genus Parasaurillus by Susan E. Evans and Belinda Searle in 2002. The taxon was found in the Mammal Bed near the base of the formation alongside the other lizards Becklesius, Dorsetisaurus, Durotrigia, Paramacellodus, Parasaurillus, Parviraptor and Saurillus. Like Becklesius, Pseudosaurillus may be a member of the family Paramacellodidae.
