= Purbicella =

Purbicella Temporal range: Berriasian

Scientific classification
- Kingdom: Animalia
- Phylum: Chordata
- Class: Reptilia
- Order: Squamata
- Genus: †Purbicella; Evans, Jones & Matsumoto, 2012
- Species: †P. ragei

Binomial name
- †Purbicella ragei Evans, Jones & Matsumoto, 2012

Extinct genus of reptiles

Purbicella is a genus of extinct squamate from the Early Cretaceous of southern England (Lulworth Formation). The type and only species is Purbicella ragei, which was described by Susan E. Evans, Marc E. H. Jones, and Ryoko Matsumoto in 2012 for a mostly complete and articulated skull from the Berriasian Lulworth Formation of Dorset. The generic name described the region of Purbeck where the fossil was found, while the species name honours paleoherpetologist Jean-Claude Rage. Purbicella has the most complete skull of any British fossil lizard, British Geological Survey (BGS) specimen GSb581, which was originally collected prior to 1911, but then remained in BGS storage until it was rediscovered and described by Evans and colleagues. The skull is unique among coexisting taxa for having fused frontal bones, and Purbicella is likely closer to modern lacertoids than any of the other British forms.

- Squamata
  - Lacertoidea
    - Purbicella
    - Lacertidae
    - - Gymnophthalmidae
      - Teiidae
  - - Anguimorpha
    - - Becklesius
      - Paramacellodus
      - - Parasaurillus
        - - Cordyliformes
          - Scincidae
