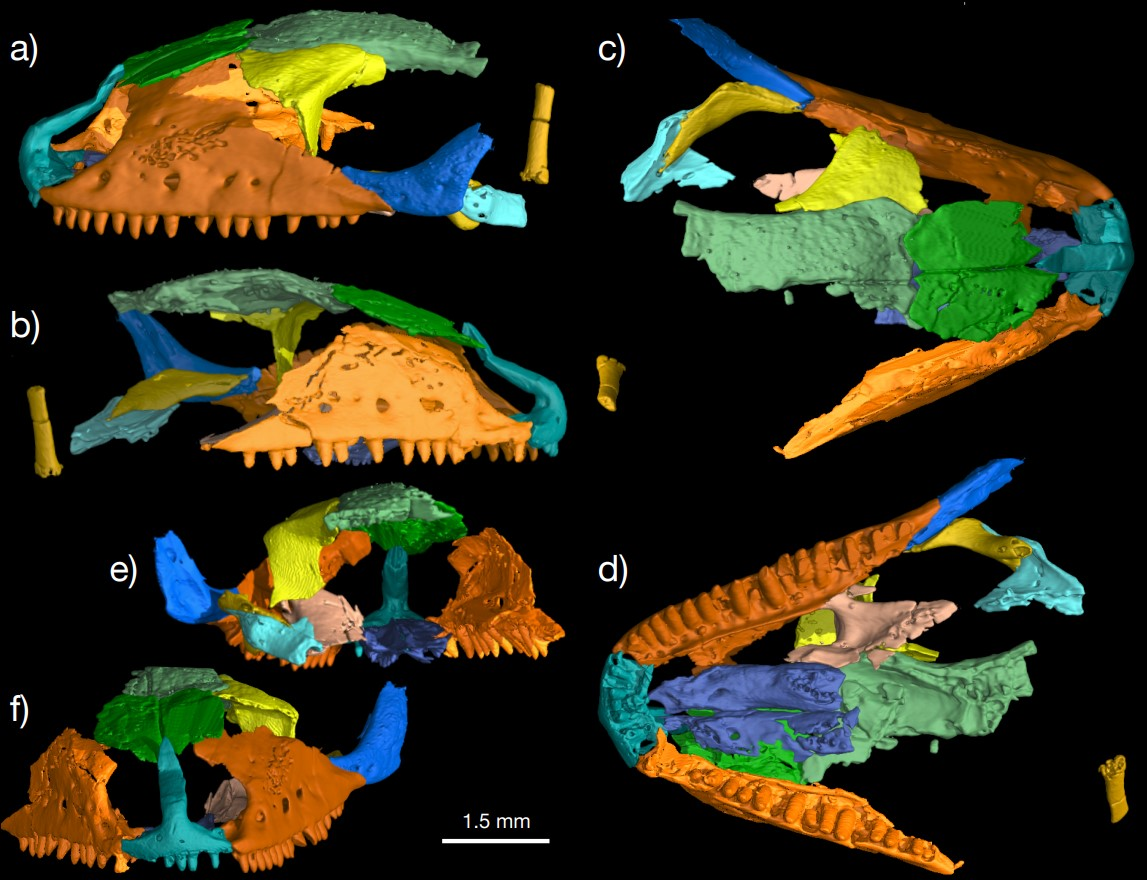
- Reconstructed skull of Eoscincus shown from multiple views

Scientific classification
- Kingdom: Animalia
- Phylum: Chordata
- Order: Squamata
- Infraorder: Scincomorpha
- Family: †Paramacellodidae
- Genus: †Eoscincus; Brownstein et al., 2022

Type species
- †Eoscincus ornatus Brownstein et al., 2022

= Eoscincus =

Eoscincus Temporal range: Late Jurassic (Tithonian), 150–149 Ma

Extinct genus of lizards

Eoscincus (/ˌiːoːʊˈskiŋkəs/) is a genus of paramacellodid squamate from the Late Jurassic Morrison Formation of North America.

== Discovery and naming ==
Eoscincus was named in 2022 by a team of authors including Chase Brownstein, Dalton Meyer, Metteo Fabbri, Anjan Bhullar, and Jacques Gauthier. In the same publication, they named the related taxon, Microteras. The genus name is derived from the Ancient Greek prefix "eo-" meaning "dawn" and the Latin word "scincus" meaning skink. The genus was named to reflect the fact that the taxon is among the oldest known members of the crown-group Scincomorpha. The species epithet, ornatus, means "ornamented" and is a reference to the rugose texture of the skull bones.

== Description ==
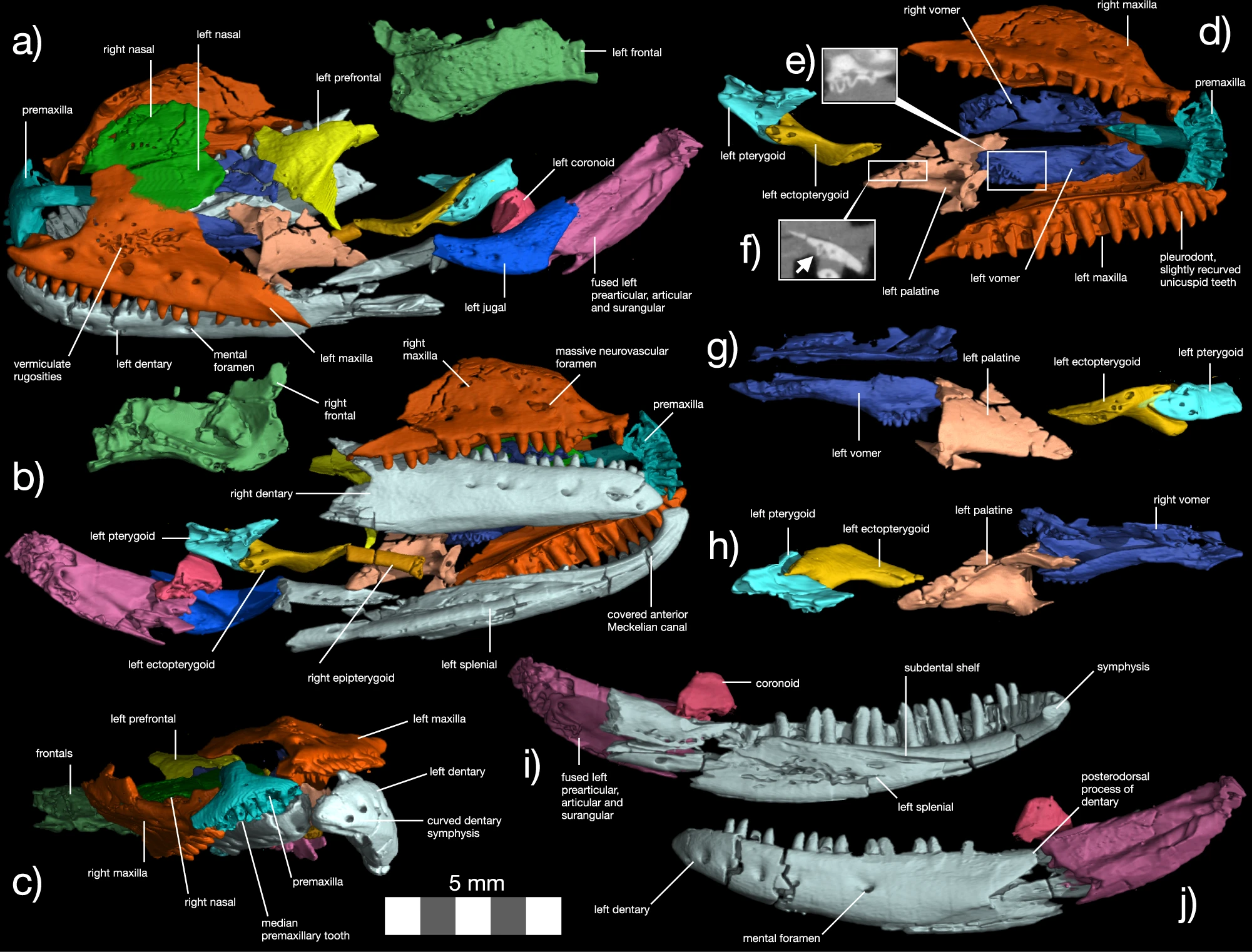
CT scans of several elements of the holotype of Eoscincus

The holotype of Eoscincus, given the specimen number DINO 14864, consists of a mostly complete skull and mandible. A few elements are missing, including most of the braincase, the skull roof behind the orbits, and the quadrate bones.

The skull bones of Eoscincus preserve several diagnostic features which allowed Brownstein and colleagues to justify the naming of a new genus and species. Eoscincus can be distinguished from all other pan-scincoids by the following autapomorphies: the ascending ramus of the maxilla is highly elongated, the presence of two rows of vomerine teeth that are larger than both the palatine and pterygoid teeth, three foramina on each vomer, an elongated splenial, and the lack of a concavity on the anterior part of the vomer.

The known remains of Eoscincus make it difficult to assess the specimen's ontogeny. Most skeletal signs of ontogeny in squamates are preserved in the braincase and limbs, which are both lacking in Eoscincus. Brownstein and colleagues determined that the only known fossil of Eoscincus was likely fully grown or nearly so due to the complete fusion of the prearticular and surangular bones.

== Classification ==
Phylogenetic studies of early-diverging squamates have not yielded very definitive results, and the parsimony analysis of Brownstein and colleagues recovered most of Scincomorpha in a large polytomy. However, their results did suggest that Eoscincus was a close relative of the european paramacellodid Becklesius as well as with Microteras. An abbreviated version of the cladogram presented by Brownstein and colleagues is shown below.

- Pan-Scincoidea
  - Paramacellodidae
    - - †Becklesius
      - †Eoscincus
    - - †Microteras
      - †Parmeosaurus
  - - - Cordylidae
      - - †Tepexisaurus
        - Xantusiidae
    - - - †Carusia
        - †Myrmecodaptria
      - - Scincidae
        - - †Eoxanta
          - †Globauridae

== Paleoenvironment ==
The only fossils of Eoscincus currently known were discovered at Dinosaur National Monument in a quarry which corresponds to the Late Jurassic-aged Morrison Formation. The sedimentary geology of the area indicates that, during the Jurassic Period, the area was a seasonally-variable alluvial plain dominated by conifers, ferns, and cycads. Other vertebrate life from the area included other reptiles such as turtles, rhynchocephalians, and crocodyliformes, such as the genera Goniopholis and Hoplosuchus. The dominant terrestrial life of the time were the non-avian dinosaurs. Among the dinosaurs known from Dinosaur National Monument are the giant sauropods Camarasaurus, Apatosaurus, Diplodocus, and Barosaurus, the theropods Allosaurus and Ceratosaurus, and several ornithischian genera including Stegosaurus, Camptosaurus, and Dryosaurus.
