= Durotrigia =

Durotrigia Temporal range: Berriasian

Scientific classification
- Kingdom: Animalia
- Phylum: Chordata
- Class: Reptilia
- Order: Squamata
- Superfamily: †Ardeosauroidea
- Family: †Globauridae
- Genus: †Durotrigia; Hoffstetter, 1967
- Species: †D. triconidens

Binomial name
- †Durotrigia triconidens Hoffstetter, 1967

Extinct genus of lizards

Durotrigia is a genus of extinct lizard from the Early Cretaceous of southern England. The type and only species is Durotrigia triconidens, named in 1967 by Robert Hoffstetter for jaw material in a review of the lizard fauna of the Berriasian Lulworth Formation. The genus was found in the Mammal Bed near the base of the formation alongside the other lizards Paramacellodus, Becklesius, Pseudosaurillus, Dorsetisaurus, Saurillus and Parviraptor. Durotrigia is likely a genus within the family Globauridae.
