= Sharovisaurus =

Sharovisaurus Temporal range: Late Jurassic

Scientific classification
- Domain: Eukaryota
- Kingdom: Animalia
- Phylum: Chordata
- Class: Reptilia
- Order: Squamata
- Family: †Paramacellodidae
- Genus: †Sharovisaurus; Hecht and Hecht, 1984

Type species
- †Sharovisaurus karatauensis Hecht and Hecht, 1984

Extinct genus of lizards

Sharovisaurus is an extinct genus of scincomorph lizard from the Late Jurassic of Kazakhstan. It belongs to an extinct family of Mesozoic lizards called Paramacellodidae, which existed across most of Laurasia during the Late Jurassic and Early Cretaceous. The type and only species is Sharovisaurus karatauensis, named in 1984 on the basis of a nearly complete articulated skeleton from the Oxfordian-aged Karabastau Formation.

== Description ==
Sharovisaurus is known from holotype specimen PIN No. 2585/26 which preserves whole body, and PIN No. 2585/41 which preserves tail. It was large lizard, it measures 137.7 millimetres (5.42 in) from tip of the jaw to posterior part of pelvis, and had 228.3 millimetres (8.99 in) long tail, it is one of the largest paramacellodids. The back and tail of the skeleton are covered in rectangular-shaped bony plates called osteoderms, which have a similar arrangement to those of modern skinks. Like other paramacellodids it had relatively short and robust limbs in comparison to the rest of its body.
