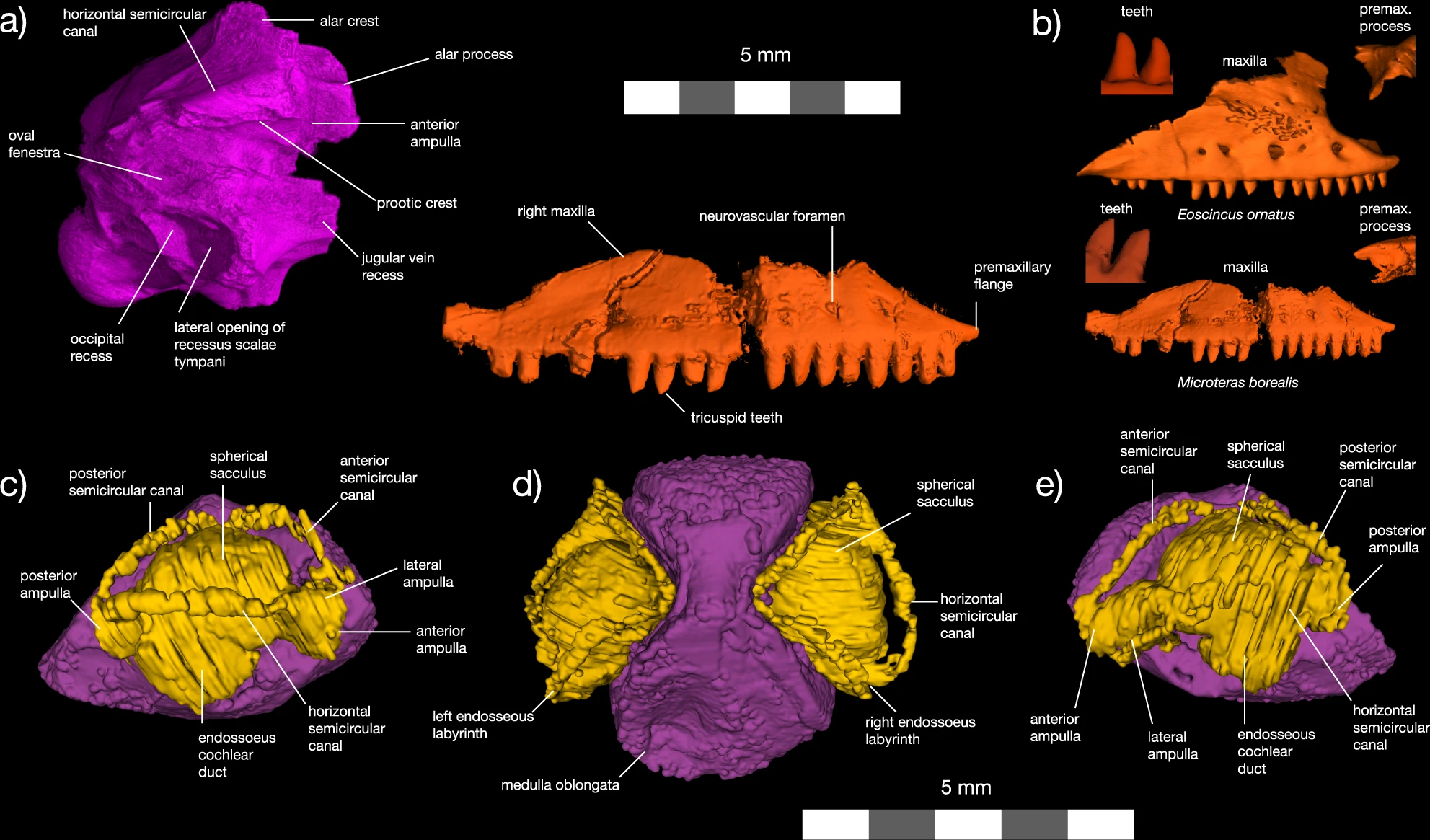
- CT scans of several of the skull elements of Microteras

Scientific classification
- Kingdom: Animalia
- Phylum: Chordata
- Class: Reptilia
- Order: Squamata
- Infraorder: Scincomorpha
- Genus: †Microteras; Brownstein et al., 2022

Type species
- †Microteras borealis Brownstein et al., 2022

= Microteras =

Microteras Temporal range: Late Jurassic (Tithonian), 150–149 Ma

Extinct genus of lizards

Microteras (/ˌmaɪkroʊˈtɛrəs/) is a genus of scincomorph squamate from the Late Jurassic Morrison Formation of North America. Microteras was named in 2022 by a team of authors including Chase Brownstein, Dalton Meyer, Metteo Fabbri, Anjan Bhullar, and Jacques Gauthier. In the same publication, they named the related taxon, Eoscincus. The binomial name (M. borealis) is composed of several Ancient Greek words and roughly means "small wonder of the North".
