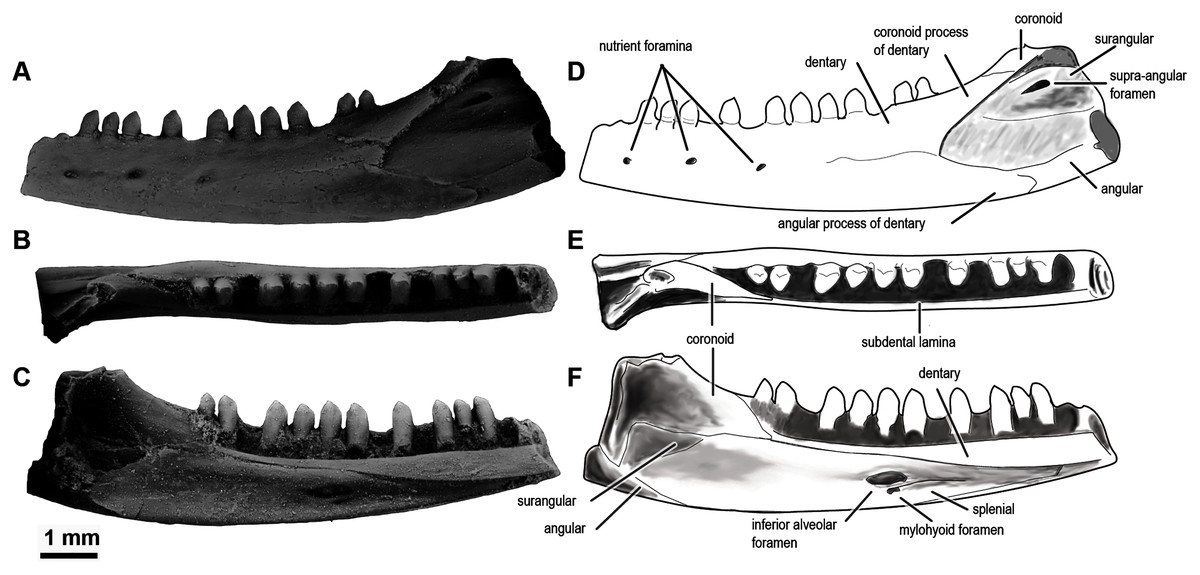
- Holotype left dentary of Sciroseps pawhuskai

Scientific classification
- Kingdom: Animalia
- Phylum: Chordata
- Class: Reptilia
- Order: Squamata
- Suborder: Scinciformata
- Infraorder: Scincomorpha
- Family: †Paramacellodidae
- Genus: †Sciroseps; Suarez et al., 2021

Type species
- †Sciroseps pawhuskai Suarez et al., 2021

= Sciroseps =

Sciroseps Temporal range: Albian

Extinct genus of reptiles

Sciroseps is an extinct genus of scincomorph squamates known from a partial left mandible, UA-2016-13-294, from the Early Cretaceous (Albian) Holly Creek Formation of the Trinity Group in Arkansas, USA. The type and only species is Sciroseps pawhuskai. Its generic name is derived from Greek "σκυρος: skiros" (gypsum), and "σεπος: sepos" (lizard or snake); and its species name refers to historic Osage chief Pawhuska.

Sciroseps is thought to be related to a clade containing the extinct Paramacellodidae and the extant Cordylidae. Suarez et al. list the defining autapomorphies for this taxon as a more gracile and convex dentary, less robust and shorter subdental laminae, dental coronae lacking lingual striae, overall more "gracile" dentition, subpleurodont tooth attachments, spatulate coronae, equal-in-length crista mesialis and crista distalis of posteriormost teeth, wider pars furcata, smaller crista intercuspidalis, "a more acutely pointed apex of the surangular notch, angular clasping of the surangular process of the dentary, coronoid process less exposed laterally between coronoid and surangular, tooth crowns more triangular, tooth crowns extending further beyond lateral parapet of dentary, and presence of well-defined inferior alveolar foramen in splenial," robust tooth shafts and widely spaced, taller, pointed coronae, lacking a distinct cusp of the angulis mesialis.
