= Karabastau Formation =

Geologic formation in Kazakhstan

- Stratigraphic range: Middle Jurassic - Late Jurassic Callovian–Kimmeridgian
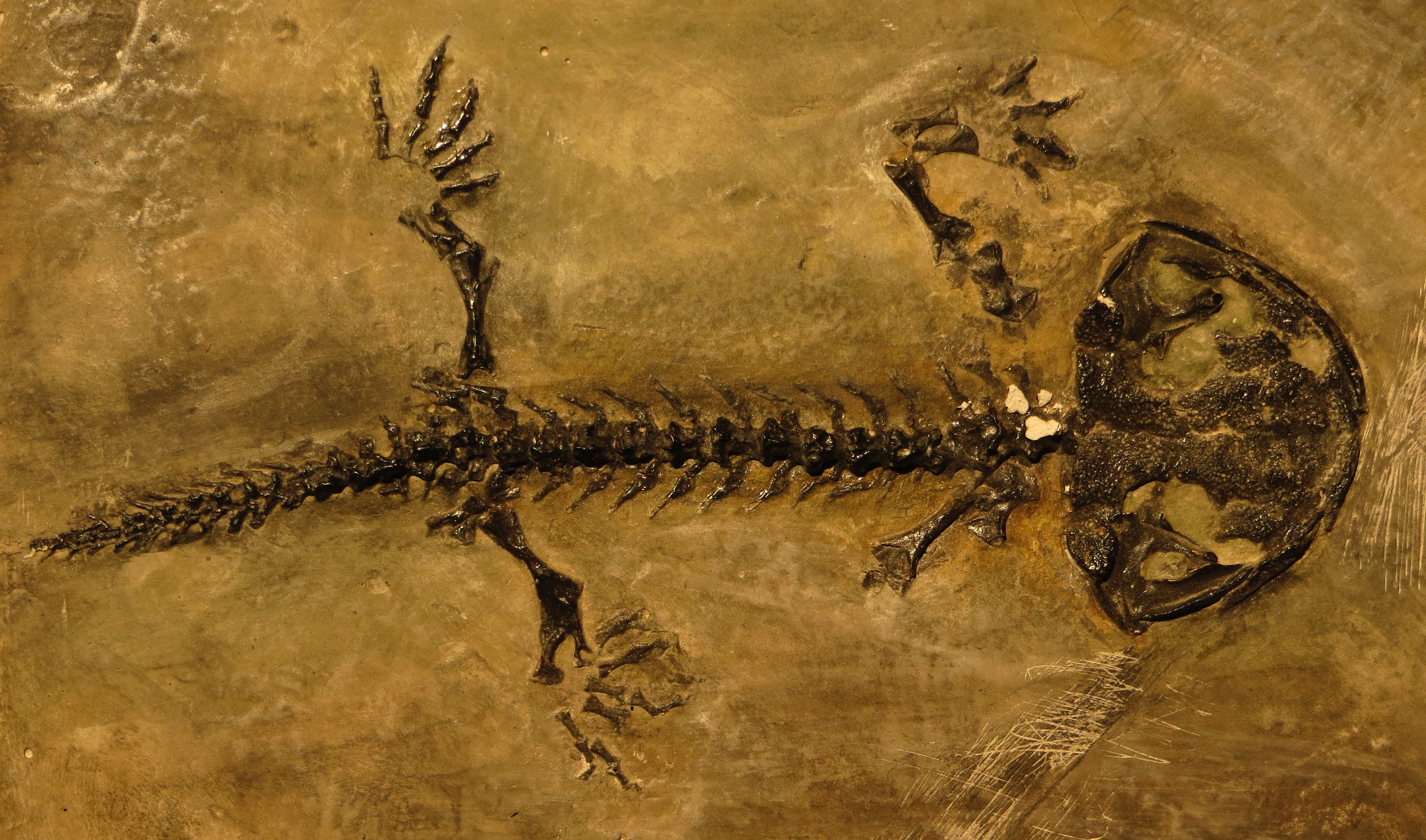
- Specimen of the salamander Karaurus sharovi
- Type: Geological formation
- Area: Karatau Mountains
- Thickness: 26 m (85 ft) exposed

Lithology
- Primary: Claystone dolomite,
- Other: Sandstone, conglomerate

Location
- Region: Central Asia
- Country: Kazakhstan

The Karabastau Formation (Kazakh: Qarabastaý svıtasy) is a geological formation and lagerstätte in the Karatau Mountains of southern Kazakhstan whose strata date to the Middle to Late Jurassic. It is an important locality for insect fossils that has been studied since the early 20th century, alongside the rarer remains of vertebrates, including pterosaurs, salamanders, lizards and crocodiles.

== Lithology and depositional environment ==
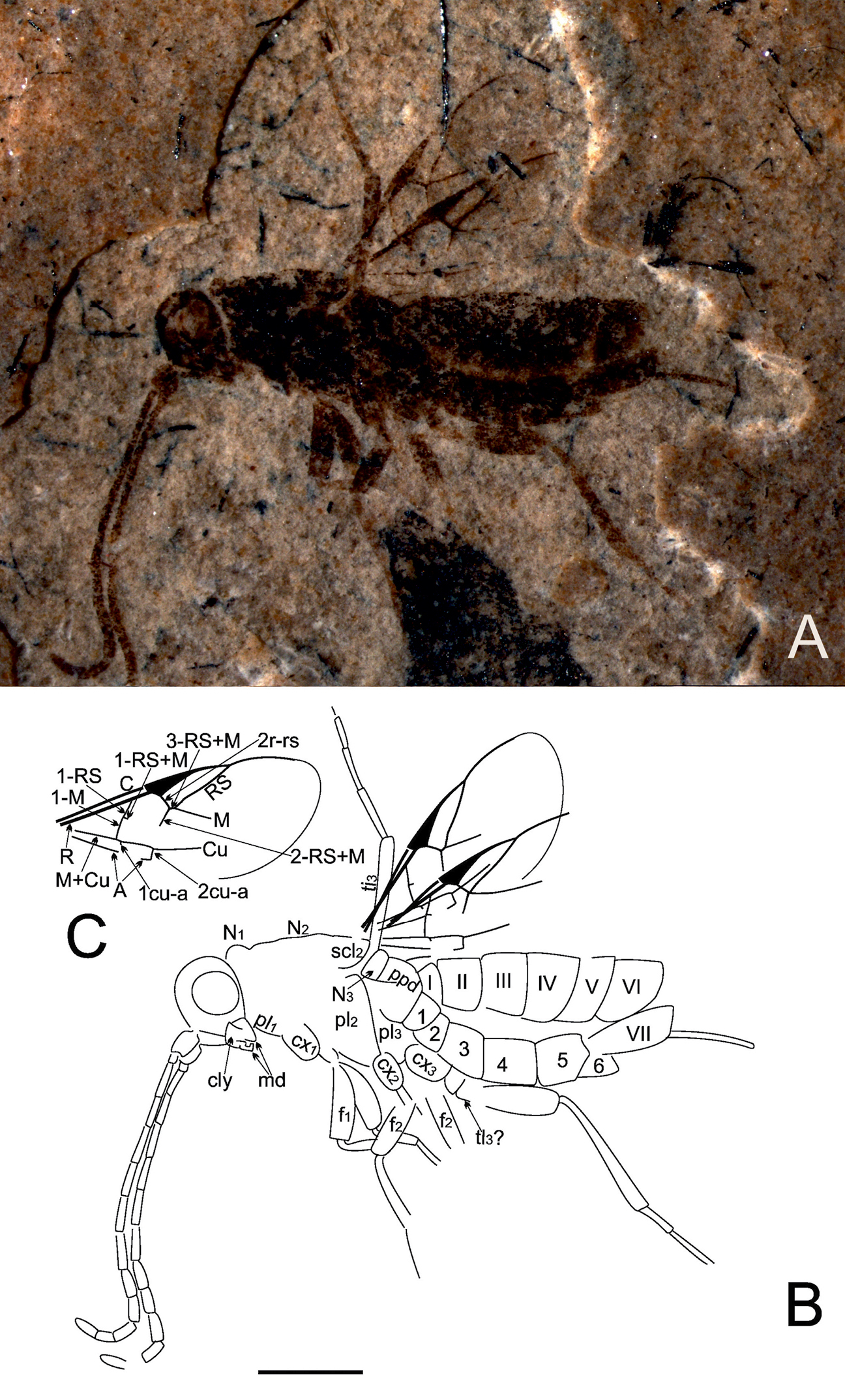
Fossil wasp Arkadiserphus (Peleserphidae)

The primary lithology consists of 1 mm thick varve laminations of claystone, with a dark part and a light dolomitic part, which probably correspond to a wet and dry season respectively, alongside rare, several cm thick sandstone interbeds. These were deposited within an ancient freshwater paleolake, that given the number of laminations has been suggested to have existed for over 150,000 years. The top of the formation shows the laminations becoming wavy, likely as a result of microbial interactions, and the top of the formation is capped by a conglomerate predominantly composed of black Carboniferous limestone pebbles.

== History of discovery ==
The Karabastau Formation was first discovered in 1921 by Soviet geologists, and was declared a protected paleontological reserve in 1924.

== Paleofauna ==
=== Vertebrates ===
Genus	Species	County	Member	Abundance	Notes	Images
Batrachognathus	B. volans			2 specimens	An Anurognathid Pterosaur.	Sordes pilosus Morrolepis aniscowitchi
Karatausuchus	K. sharovi				An Atoposaurid Crocodylomorph.	Sordes pilosus Morrolepis aniscowitchi
Karaurus	K. sharovi				stem-group salamander.	Sordes pilosus Morrolepis aniscowitchi
Praeornis	P. sharovi			2 specimens	Proto-Feather	Sordes pilosus Morrolepis aniscowitchi
Sharovisaurus	S. karatauensis				A Paramacellodid lizard	Sordes pilosus Morrolepis aniscowitchi
Sordes	S. pilosus			8 specimens	A Pterodactylomorph Pterosaur.	Sordes pilosus Morrolepis aniscowitchi
Yaxartemys	Y. longicauda				Turtle, possibly belongs to Xinjiangchelyidae	Sordes pilosus Morrolepis aniscowitchi
Morrolepis	M. aniscowitchi			346 specimens	Coccolepidid fish	Sordes pilosus Morrolepis aniscowitchi
Pteroniscus	P. turkestanensis			346 specimens	Palaeonisciform fish, closely related to Uighuroniscidae and Daqingshaniscus.	Sordes pilosus Morrolepis aniscowitchi
Spherosteus	S. scharovi				Peipiaosteid fish, related to sturgeons and paddlefish	Sordes pilosus Morrolepis aniscowitchi

=== Invertebrates ===
Hundreds of species of insects are known from several localities within the formation, primarily Karatau-Mikhailovka

== Flora ==
Genus	Species	County	Member	Abundance	Notes	Images
Williamsoniella	Williamsoniella karataviensis				Bennettitales	
Weltrichia	Weltrichia auliensis				Bennettitales	
Ptilophyllum					Bennettitales	
Otozamites					Bennettitales	
Brachyphyllum					Conifer	
Pagiophyllum					Conifer	

== See also ==
- List of pterosaur-bearing stratigraphic units
- List of fossiliferous stratigraphic units in Kazakhstan
