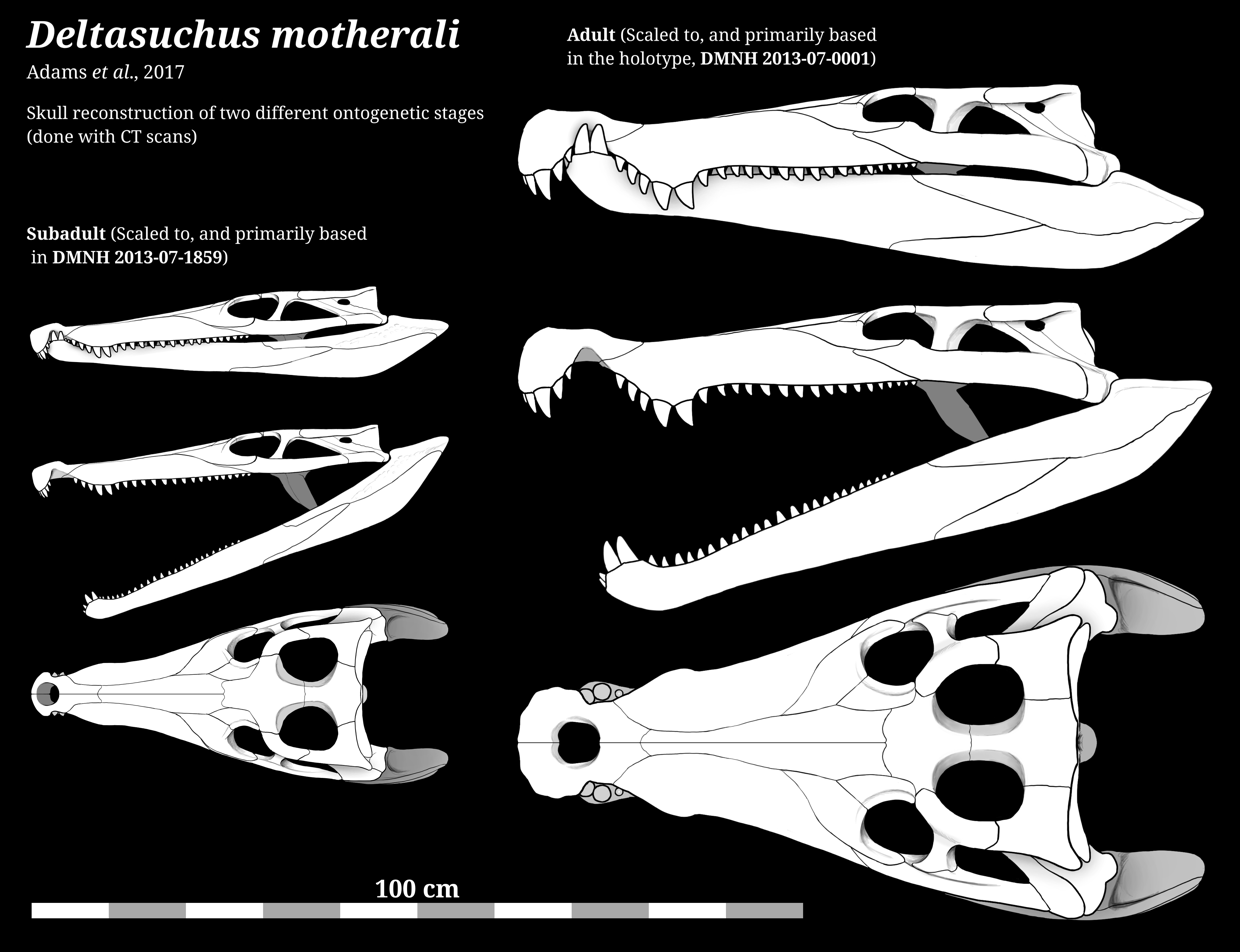
- Skull diagram of a subadult and adult individuals
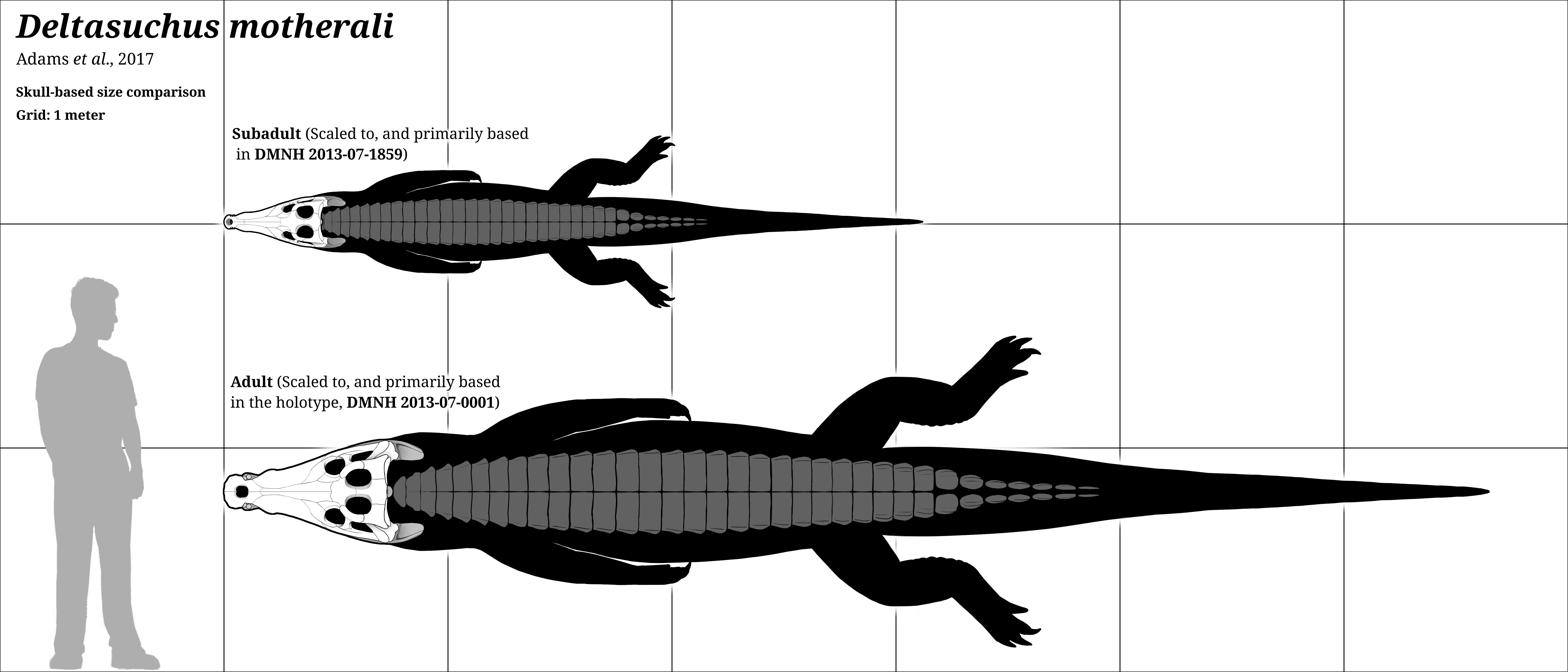
- Size comparison

Scientific classification
- Kingdom: Animalia
- Phylum: Chordata
- Class: Reptilia
- Clade: Pseudosuchia
- Clade: Crocodylomorpha
- Clade: Neosuchia
- Genus: †Deltasuchus; Adams et al., 2017

Type species
- Deltasuchus motherali Adams et al., 2017

= Deltasuchus =

Deltasuchus Temporal range: Late Cretaceous, 96 Ma

Extinct genus of reptiles

Deltasuchus ("delta crocodile") is a genus of neosuchian crocodyliform from the Late Cretaceous of Texas, specifically in the Woodbine Formation, which was a part of the Appalachian continent during the Cretaceous. It is known from one species, D. motherali, named in 2017 by Stephanie Drumheller, Thomas Adams and Christopher Noto. It was a large crocodyliform with an estimated total body length of more than 5 metres (16 ft). In 2021, new material was described, allowing Deltasuchus to be placed within the family Paluxysuchidae as the sister taxon to Paluxysuchus, and it was highligted that juveniles possessed a slenderer snout, indicating an ontogenetic broadening of the skull as the animal grew. It possessed a pair of enlarged canine-like teeth on each side of the lower jaw (corresponding to the 3rd and 4th tooth of each dentary).
