= Saurillodon =

Saurillodon Temporal range: Late Jurassic

Scientific classification
- Domain: Eukaryota
- Kingdom: Animalia
- Phylum: Chordata
- Class: Reptilia
- Order: Squamata
- Family: †Paramacellodidae
- Genus: †Saurillodon; Estes, 1983

Type species
- †Saurillodon proraformis Estes, 1983

Other species
- †Saurillodon marmorensis Evans, 1998

Extinct genus of lizards

Saurillodon is a genus of prehistoric lizard of the Late Jurassic of Portugal, UK and Morrison Formation of Western North America.

Present in stratigraphic zone 4.

== See also ==
- Paleobiota of the Morrison Formation
