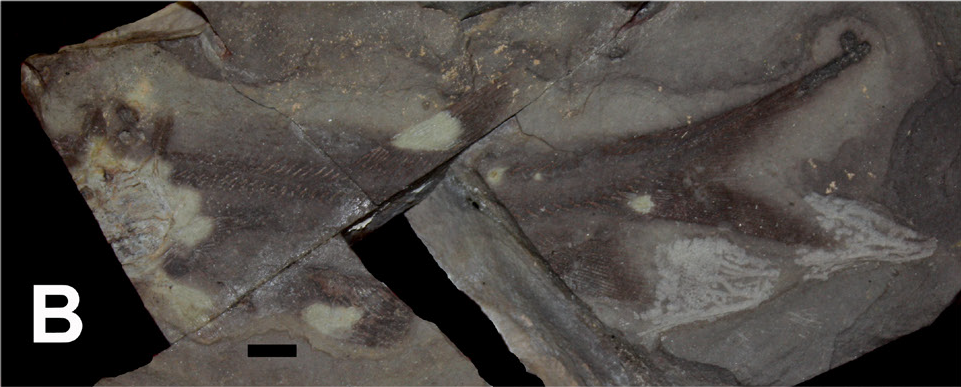
- Morrolepis schaefferi fossil
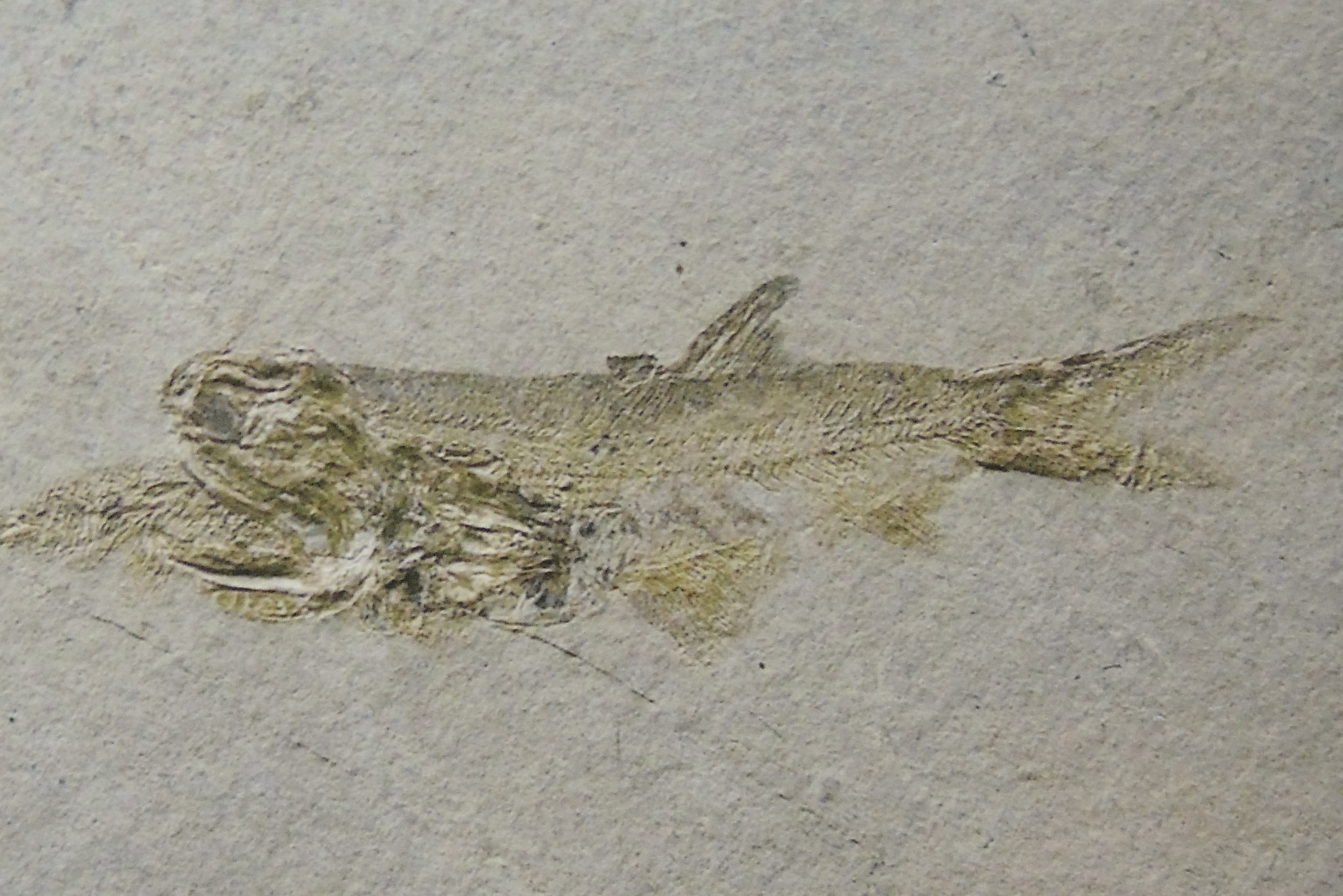
- Morrolepis aniscowitchi fossil

Scientific classification
- Kingdom: Animalia
- Phylum: Chordata
- Class: Actinopterygii
- Family: †Coccolepididae
- Genus: †Morrolepis; Kirkland, 1998

Type species
- †Morrolepis schaefferi Kirkland, 1998

Other species
- †M. andrewsi (Woodward, 1891); †M. aniscowitchi (Gorizdor-Kulczycka, 1926)

= Morrolepis =

Morrolepis Temporal range: Late Jurassic-earliest Cretaceous ~163.5–140.0 Ma

Extinct genus of ray-finned fishes

Morrolepis is an extinct genus of prehistoric coccolepidid "palaeoniscoid" ray-finned fish that lived during the Late Jurassic and earliest Cretaceous epochs in Europe, Asia and North America.

The type species is Morrolepis schaefferi from the Morrison Formation (Colorado, Utah), measuring approximately 20 centimetres (7.9 in) in length. The other species were previously referred to the genus Coccolepis. Including M. andrewsi (Woodward, 1891) from the earliest Cretaceous (Berriasian) Purbeck Group, England and M. aniscowitchi (Gorizdor-Kulczycka, 1926) from the late Middle Jurassic-early Late Jurassic (Callovian/Oxfordian) Karabastau Formation of Kazakhstan.

== See also ==
- Prehistoric fish
- List of prehistoric bony fish
- Paleobiota of the Morrison Formation
