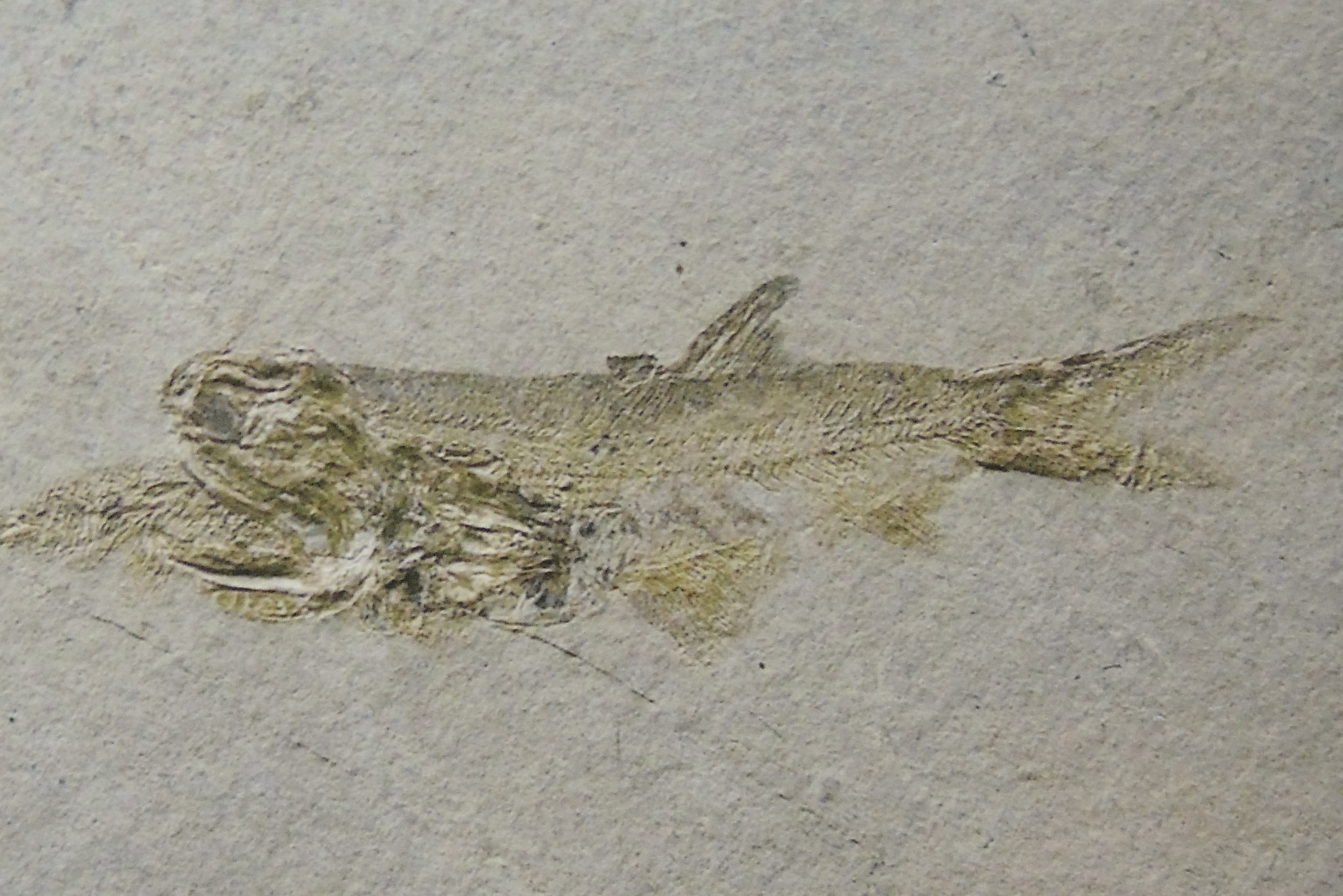
- Morrolepis aniscowitchi

Scientific classification
- Kingdom: Animalia
- Phylum: Chordata
- Class: Actinopterygii
- Subclass: Chondrostei
- Family: †Coccolepididae; Berg, 1940

Genera
- †Barbalepis; †Cacatualepis; †Coccolepis; †Condorlepis; †Morrolepis; †Plesiococcolepis; †Sunolepis; †Toarcocephalus

= Coccolepididae =

Coccolepididae Temporal range: Early Jurassic to Early Cretaceous (Sinemurian-Aptian)

Extinct family of ray-finned fishes

Coccolepididae is an extinct family of ray-finned fish, known from the Early Jurassic to Early Cretaceous, most of which were originally referred to the type genus Coccolepis. They had a widespread distribution, being found in North and South America, Australia, Asia and Europe. They are mostly known from freshwater environments, though several species have been found in marine environments. They are morphologically conservative, and have poorly ossified endo and exoskeletons, which usually results in poor preservation. Historically, they have been classified as members "Palaeonisciformes”, a paraphyletic grouping of non-neopterygian fish, due to their plesiomorphic conservative morphology closely resembling those of many other groups of earlier ray-finned fish. Some recent authors have suggested that they may belong to the order Chondrostei as relatives of the Acipenseriformes (which contains sturgeons and paddlefish).

== History and classification ==
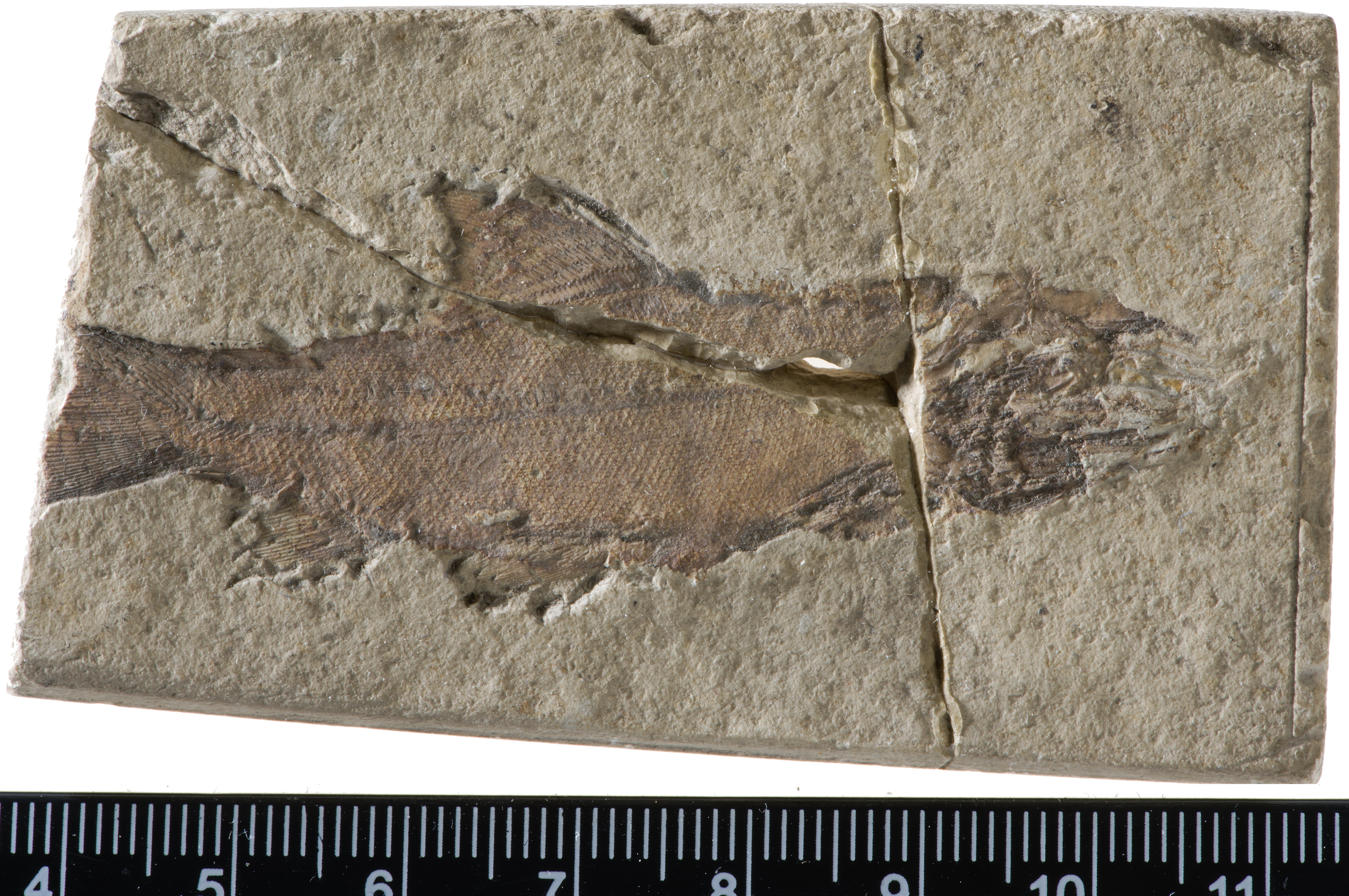
The type specimen of Coccolepis bucklandi.

The type species, Coccolepis bucklandi, was described in Agassiz in 1843 though the original type specimen of the species was lost. This genus was important to our understanding of fossil fish at the time due to it being the first non neopterygian actinopterygian from younger than the Triassic. The family Coccolepididae was originally proposed by Berg in 1940 though it was originally spelled "Coccolepidae". Most coccolepidids were originally described as species of Coccolepis before various redescriptions of material.

Coccolepidids are traditionally classified as 'palaeoniscoids', a probably paraphyletic grouping of basal ray-finned fish. Historically, coccolepidids were considered to be "typical" paleoniscoids. Some authors also argued that coccolepidids were direct descendants of the earlier family Palaeoniscidae. However, a number of recent authors, beginning with López-Arbarello et al. (2002). have suggested that family has affinities with the Chondrostei (the broader group which includes the living order Acipenseriformes, which contains sturgeon and paddlefish) based on a number of morphological features, though some have retained classifying coccolepidids as paleoniscoids. A 2025 cladistic analysis in contrast found Coccolepididae to be a group of basal ray-finned fish outside of the crown group of Actinopterygii, which would make all living ray-finned fish more closely related to each other than to Coccolepididae. The exact placement of the group is unknown though members lack certain traits seen in acipenseriforms. Unlike acipenseriforms, coccolepids possess maxillary and premaxillary bones.

=== List of genera and species ===
- Coccolepis Agassiz, 1843 Solnhofen Limestone, Germany, Late Jurassic (Tithonian)
  - Coccolepis bucklandi Agassiz, 1843
  - Coccolepis solnhofensis López-Arbarello, and Ebert, 2021
- "Coccolepis" liassica Woodward, 1890 Blue Lias or Charmouth Mudstone Formation, England, Early Jurassic (Sinemurian)
- Cacatualepis Bean, 2025
  - Cacatualepis australis (Woodward, 1895) Talbragar Fossil Beds, Australia, Late Jurassic (Tithonian) formerly "Coccolepis" australis Woodward, 1895
  - Cacatualepis woodwardi (Waldman, 1971) Koonwarra Fossil Bed, Australia, Early Cretaceous (Aptian) formerly Condorlepis woodwardi (Waldman, 1971)
- Morrolepis Kirkland, 1998
  - M. schaefferi Kirkland, 1998 Morrison Formation, United States Late Jurassic (Tithonian)
  - M. aniscowitchi (Gorizdro-Kulczycka), 1926 Karabastau Formation, Kazakhstan, Middle-Late Jurassic (Callovian/Oxfordian)
  - M. andrewsi (Woodward, 1891) Purbeck Group, United Kingdom, Early Cretaceous (Berriasian)
- Barbalepis Olive, Taverne, and López-Arbarello, 2019 Sainte-Barbe Clays Formation, Belgium, Early Cretaceous (Barremian/Aptian) formerly Coccolepis macroptera Traquair, 1911
- Condorlepis López-Arbarello, Sferco, and Rauhut, 2013
  - Condorlepis groeberi (Bordas, 1943) Cañadón Calcáreo Formation, Argentina, Upper Jurassic
- Iyalepis Sytchevskaya, 2006 Cheremkhovskaya Formation, Russia, Early Jurassic (Toarcian) formerly Angaraichthys rohoni Sytchevskaya and Yakovlev, 1985
- Plesiococcolepis Wang, 1977 Lingling-Hengyang, Hunan, China, Early Jurassic
  - Plesiococcolepis hunanensis Wang, 1977
- Sunolepis Liu, 1957 Yumen, Gansu Province, China, Upper Jurassic or Lower Cretaceous
  - Sunolepis yumenensis Liu, 1957
- Toarcocephalus Cooper et al., 2024 Posidonia Shale, Germany, Early Jurassic (Toarcian)
  - Toarcocephalus morlok Cooper et al., 2024

== Description ==
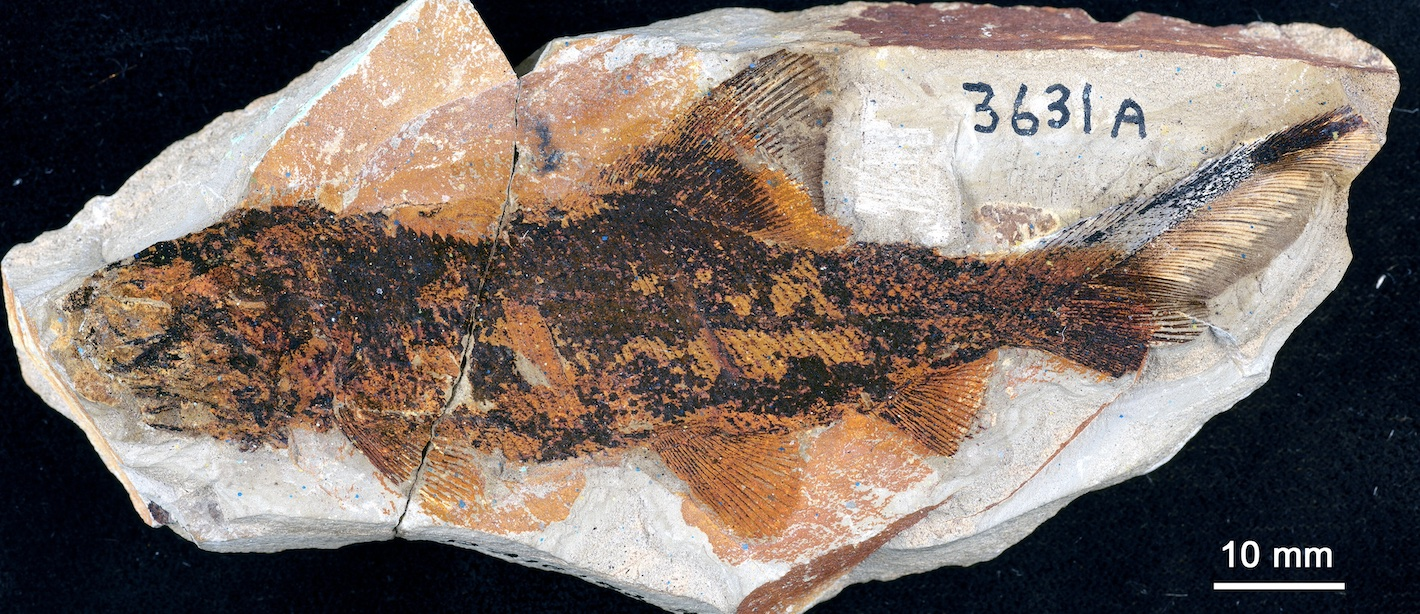
A specimen of Condorlepis woodwardi

Though Coccolepididae is believed by some authors to represent a waste basket family rather than a true grouping, there are a number of features that all members assigned to the family share, suggesting that this is a true group. Just like other groups of early ray-finned fish, the orbits of coccolepidids are placed close to the front of the skull with jaws going very far behind the orbit; the length of the jaws causing the fish to have a wide gape. The maxilla of coccolepidids has a large plate located in the area behind the orbits. Along with this, the maxilla is much longer than the lower jaw, being twice the length. The lower dentition of coccolepids is made up of a single row of conical teeth. Like some other early fish groups, the fish possess the postrostral bone that was lost in later groups. These bones are small, being placed in between the nasal bones, These bones, along with the scales and fin rays in some genera, are ornamented with denticles or tubercles. Compared other groups, fish placed in the family also had a large supracleithrum.

All genera assigned to the family are small fusiform fish with the largest genus, Barbalepis, measuring out to an estimated total length of 250–260 millimetres (9.8–10.2 in). The fish had large pectoral fins along with a single large dorsal fin with the origin of this dorsal fin being located in front of the pelvic fins. Unlike later members of the family, the pelvic fin of "Coccolepis" liassica and Plesiococcolepis hunanensis was supported additionally by a bony plate located along the base of the fin. The fin ray count of the pectoral fins range between 41 and 49 rays and the dorsal fin has over 30 rays. Similar to other early ray-finned fish, coccolepidids had a deeply forked tail with both lobes being almost equal or equal lengths depending on the taxon. The scales of coccolepids are mostly amioiod in shape with ganoid and rhomboid scales being present on the upper lobe of the caudal fin in some taxa. These scales mostly lack ganion, with the material only being present as a thin layer. The surface of the scales of coccolepids differ between genera with some being smooth while others possess extremely small denticles.

== Evolutionary history ==
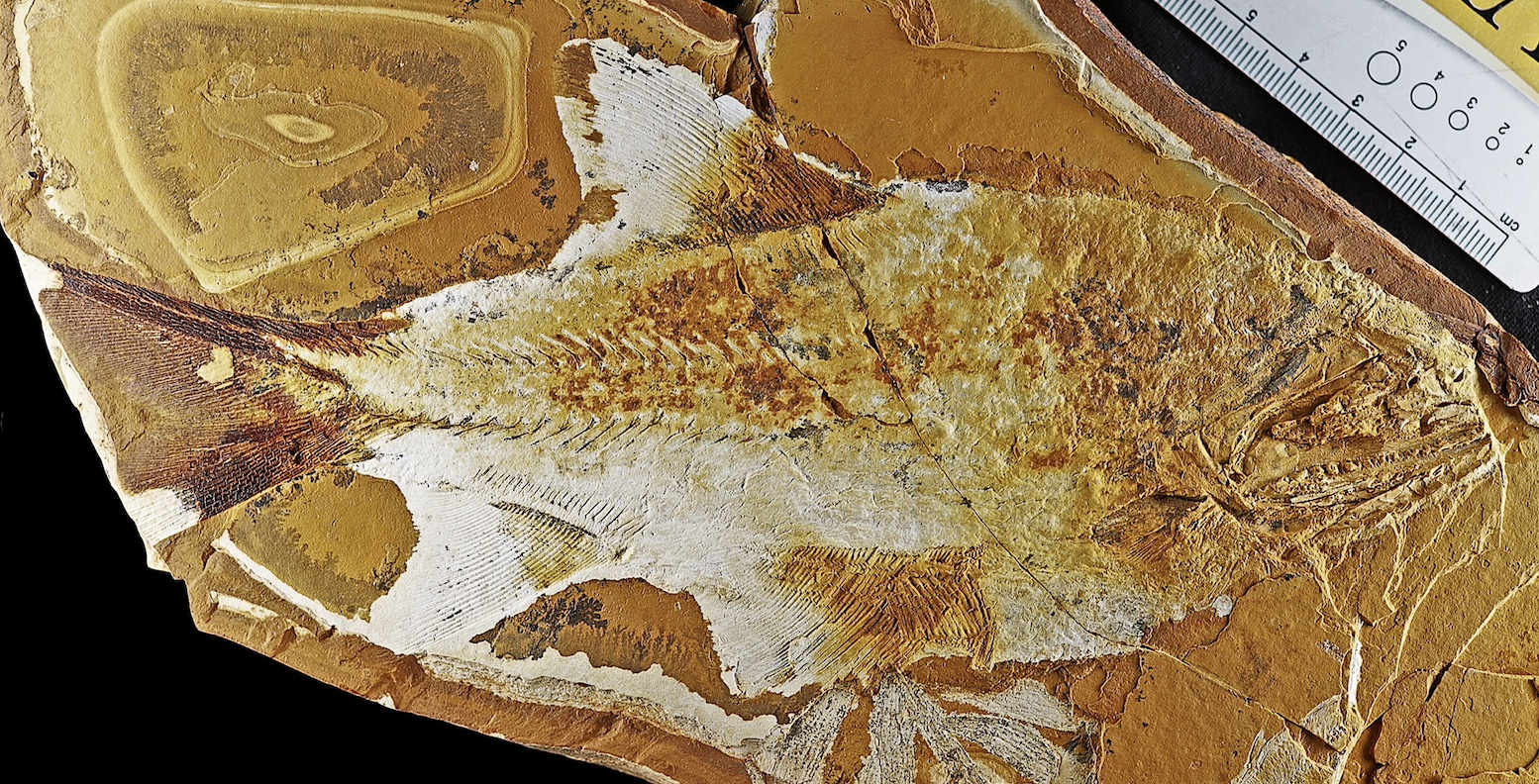
Cacatualepis australis, a freshwater Late Jurassic coccolepid from the Tithonian aged Talbragar Fossil Fish Bed in New South Wales, Australia

Due to the fact that the skeleton of coccolepids is poorly ossified, the preservation of the family is worse than other groups of fish. As a result, the early evolution of the group is lacking with coccolepids not being known from the Triassic. Even with this being the case, the earliest records of the family are dated to the early Jurassic with the group being already widespread by this point. During the early Jurassic, the group has been found in eastern and central Laurasia. In Asia, there seems to have been two separate lineages during the Jurassic with an earlier lineage, represented by Plesiococcolepis, going extinct only for descendants of the European lineage to appear after this extinction

Members of the family would more into western Laurasia during the middle-late Jurassic with the group moving into Gondwana during the early Cretaceous. Even in the earliest fossil records of the family, coccolepids lived in a variety of environments with members living in both freshwater and marine environments in the early Jurassic. It has been suggested that the group began in marine environments, only to invade freshwater ecosystems. Based on the current fossil record of the coccolepids, the group became restricted to freshwater environments during some point in the Jurassic.
