= Holly Creek Formation =

- Stratigraphic range: Cretaceous
- Type: Formation

Location
- Region: Arkansas
- Country: United States

Type section
- Named for: Little Holly Creek and Holly Creek, Howard County, Arkansas
- Named by: Harold C. Vanderpool

The Holly Creek Formation is a geologic formation in Arkansas. It preserves fossils dating back to the Cretaceous period which belong to the Trinity Group.

== Flora ==
- Cheirolepidiaceae

== Fauna ==
- Indeterminate Chondrichthyes
- Indeterminate Actinopterygii
  - Indeterminate Amiidae
- Indeterminate Semionotiformes
- Indeterminate Pycnodontiformes
  - Anomoeodus caddoi
- Lissamphibia
- Indeterminate Helochelydridae
  - Naomichelys sp.
- Indeterminate Trionychids
- Indeterminate Coelognathosuchia
- Squamata
  - Sciroseps pawhuskai
- Dinosauria
  - Acrocanthosaurus sp.
  - Deinonychus sp.
  - Richardoestesia sp.
  - Indeterminate Titanosauria
  - Indeterminate Nodosauria
- Crocodylomorpha
  - Paarthurnax holliensis

== See also ==
- List of fossiliferous stratigraphic units in Arkansas
- Paleontology in Arkansas
