= Naimanosaurus =

Naimanosaurus Temporal range: Aptian–Albian

Scientific classification
- Domain: Eukaryota
- Kingdom: Animalia
- Phylum: Chordata
- Class: Reptilia
- Order: Squamata
- Family: †Paramacellodidae
- Genus: †Naimanosaurus
- Species: †N. dinosauroaequalis

Binomial name
- †Naimanosaurus dinosauroaequalis Alifanov, 2019

Extinct lizard genus

Naimanosaurus is an extinct genus of paramacellodid that lived during the Early Cretaceous epoch.

== Distribution ==
Naimanosaurus dinosauroaequalis is known from the Hühteeg Horizon of Mongolia.
