= Neokotus =

Neokotus Temporal range: Early Cretaceous, 140 Ma

Scientific classification
- Kingdom: Animalia
- Phylum: Chordata
- Class: Reptilia
- Order: Squamata
- Family: †Paramacellodidae
- Genus: †Neokotus
- Species: †N. sanfranciscanus

Binomial name
- †Neokotus sanfranciscanus Bittencourt et al., 2020

Extinct genus of lizards

Neokotus is an extinct genus of paramacellodid lizard that lived in Brazil during the Valanginian stage. It is known from a single species, N. sanfranciscanus.

This lizard species is the oldest South American squamate known to date. The indication of this species pushes back the initial presence of these squamates 20 millions years before previously recognized. They mostly differ from the other squamates discovered at the time based on their maxillary structures, which tend to be smoother and more pronounced.

Paramacellodids were a diversely spread population during the Late Jurassic, occurring essentially everywhere except for South America. This species is the first record of paramacellodids in South America, expending on the distribution of this lineage.
