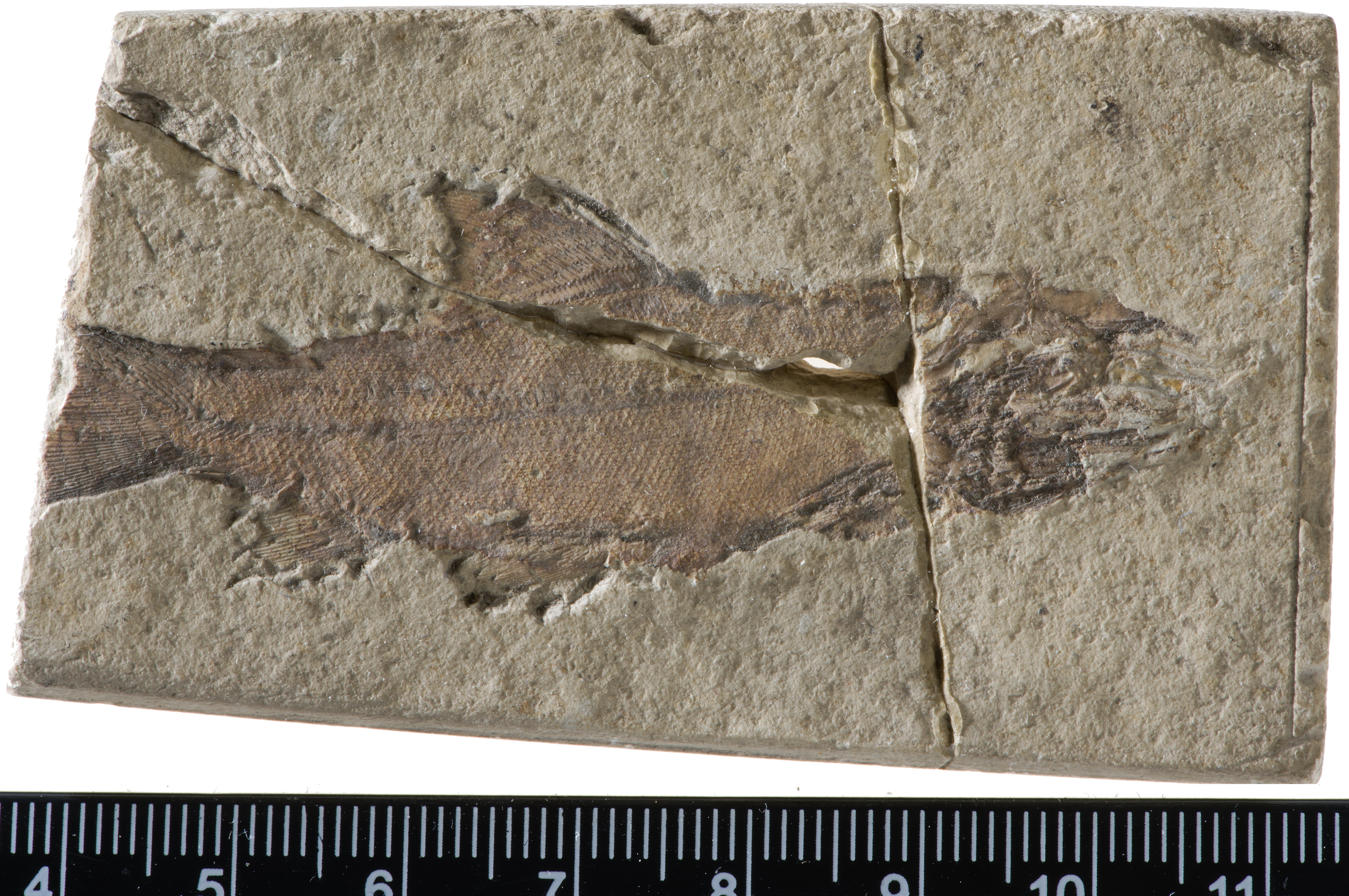
- Coccolepis bucklandi type specimen

Scientific classification
- Kingdom: Animalia
- Phylum: Chordata
- Class: Actinopterygii
- Family: †Coccolepididae
- Genus: †Coccolepis; Agassiz, 1843

Type species
- †Coccolepis bucklandi Agassiz, 1843

Other species
- †C. solnhofensis López-Arbarello & Ebert, 2021

Synonyms
- †Browneichthys Woodward, 1899

= Coccolepis =

Coccolepis Temporal range: Late Jurassic (Tithonian)

Extinct genus of fishes

Coccolepis is an extinct genus of prehistoric marine ray-finned fish in the family Coccolepididae. Originally including most species within the family, it is now restricted to two species from the Late Jurassic Solnhofen Limestone of Germany. The holotype of C. bucklandi, designated and described by Louis Agassiz, was thought to be lost but was later rediscovered in Neuchâtel.

== Taxonomy ==
Coccolepis contains the following species, both from Germany:

- †C. bucklandi Agassiz, 1843
- †C. solnhofensis López-Arbarello & Ebert, 2021

Some species originally referred to Coccolepis were later reallocated to other genera:

- Coccolepis groeberi Bordas, 1943 → Condorlepis groeberi (Bordas, 1943)
- Coccolepis andrewsi Woodward, 1891 → Morrolepis andrewsi (Woodward, 1891)
- Coccolepis aniscowitchi Gorizdor-Kulczycka, 1926 → Morrolepis aniscowitchi (Gorizdor-Kulczycka, 1926)
- Coccolepis macroptera Traquair, 1911 → Barbalepis macroptera (Traquair, 1911)
- Coccolepis australis Woodward, 1895 → Cacatualepis australis (Woodward, 1895)

"Coccolepis" liassica Woodward, 1890 (Early Jurassic of the Jurassic Coast, United Kingdom) is not thought to be true member of Coccolepis, but is still of uncertain phylogenetic placement.

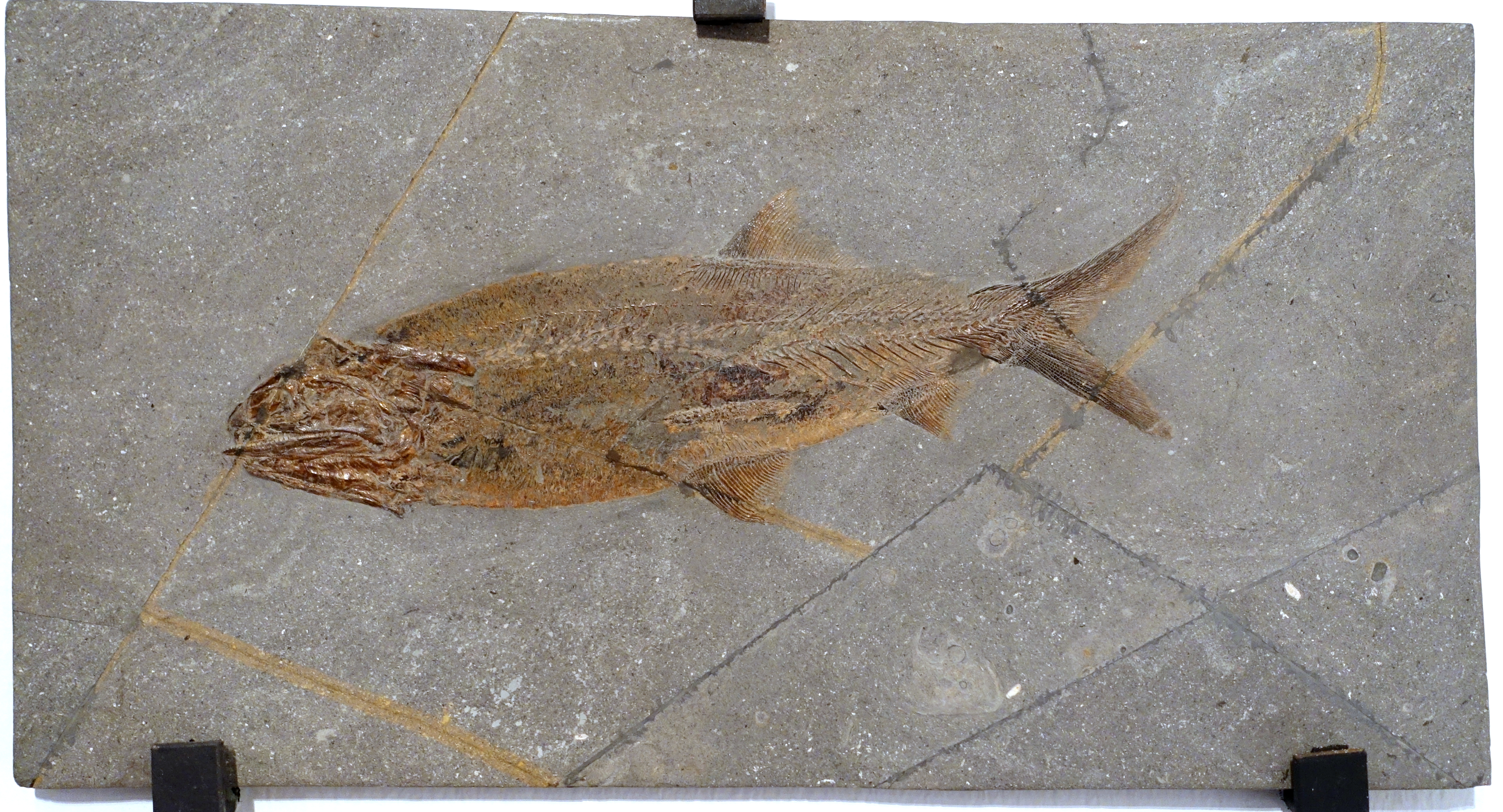
Coccolepis sp. fossil at the State Natural History Museum, Braunschweig

== See also ==
- Prehistoric fish
- List of prehistoric bony fish
