= Karatausuchus =

Karatausuchus Temporal range: Late Jurassic Oxfordian–Kimmeridgian

Scientific classification
- Domain: Eukaryota
- Kingdom: Animalia
- Phylum: Chordata
- Class: Reptilia
- Clade: Archosauria
- Clade: Pseudosuchia
- Clade: Crocodylomorpha
- Clade: Crocodyliformes
- Family: †Atoposauridae
- Genus: †Karatausuchus; Efimov, 1976

Type species
- †Karatausuchus sharovi Efimov, 1976

Extinct genus of reptiles

Karatausuchus is an extinct genus of atoposaurid crocodylomorph. It is known from a single specimen discovered in the Late Jurassic (Oxfordian - Kimmeridgian) Karabastau Svita from the vicinity of Mikhailovka in the Karatau Mountains of southern Kazakhstan. The type specimen is PIN 25858/1, a complete but poorly preserved juvenile skeleton with some possible soft tissue preservation. It is notable for having over 90 teeth, but its other anatomical details are difficult to discern. The length of this individual is estimated at 160 millimetres (6.3 in). Karatausuchus was described in 1976 by Mikhail Efimov, and the type species is K. sharovi.
