= Plesiococcolepis =

Plesiococcolepis Temporal range: Early Jurassic

Scientific classification
- Kingdom: Animalia
- Phylum: Chordata
- Class: Actinopterygii
- Family: †Coccolepididae
- Genus: †Plesiococcolepis; Wang, 1977

Type species
- Plesiococcolepis hunanensis Wang, 1977

Extinct genus of ray-finned fishes

Plesiococcolepis is an extinct genus of prehistoric ray-finned fish. It belongs to the family Coccolepididae and is known from the Early Jurassic of Lingling-Hengyang, Hunan, China.

== See also ==
- Prehistoric fish
- List of prehistoric bony fish
