= Khereidia =

Khereidia Temporal range: Aptian–Albian

Scientific classification
- Domain: Eukaryota
- Kingdom: Animalia
- Phylum: Chordata
- Class: Reptilia
- Order: Squamata
- Family: †Globauridae
- Genus: †Khereidia
- Species: †K. aptiana

Binomial name
- †Khereidia aptiana Alifanov, 2019

Extinct lizard genus

Khereidia is an extinct genus of globaurid that lived during the Early Cretaceous epoch.

== Distribution ==
Khereidia aptiana is known from the Hühteeg Horizon of Mongolia.
