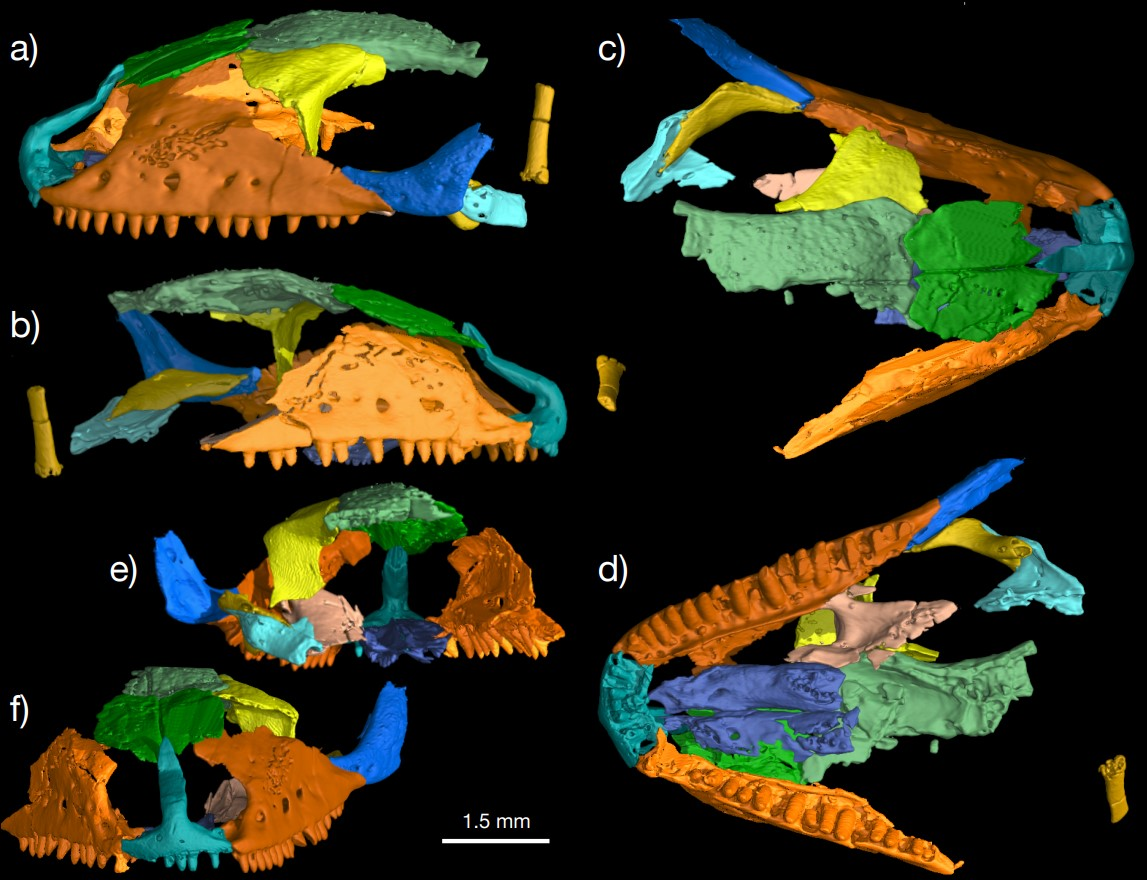
- Skull of Eoscincus
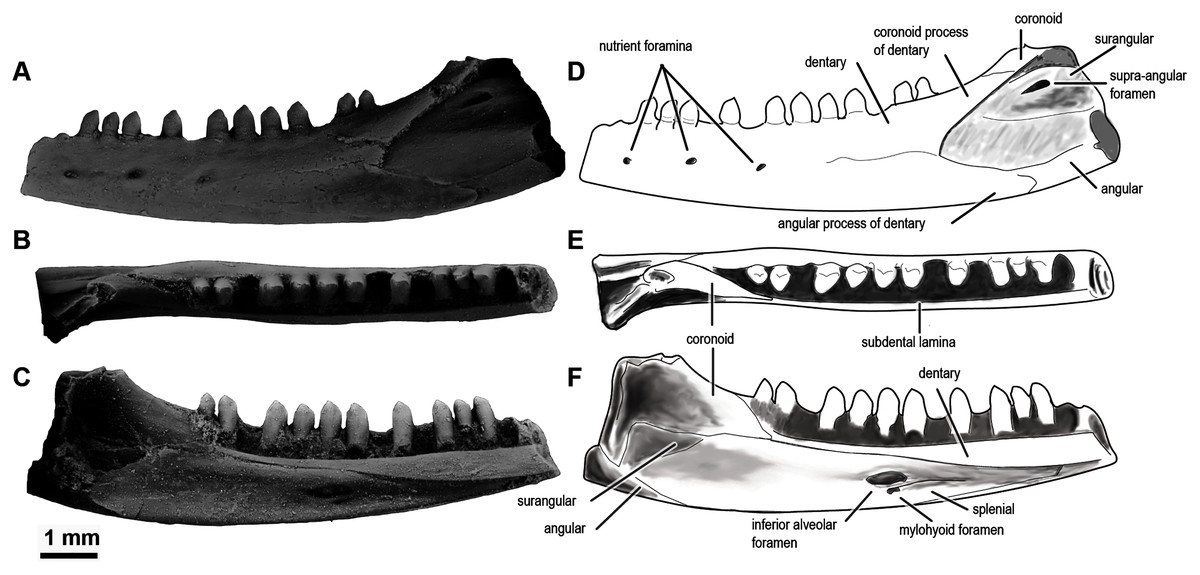
- Lower jaw of Sciroseps

Scientific classification
- Kingdom: Animalia
- Phylum: Chordata
- Class: Reptilia
- Order: Squamata
- Infraorder: Scincomorpha
- Family: †Paramacellodidae; Estes, 1983

Genera
- †Atokasaurus?; †Becklesius; †Becklesisaurus; †Changetisaurus; †Eoscincus; †Mimobecklesisaurus; †Naimanosaurus; †Neokotus; †Paramacellodus; †Parmeosaurus; †Pseudosaurillus?; †Saurillodon; †Sciroseps; †Sharovisaurus

= Paramacellodidae =

Paramacellodidae Temporal range: Middle Jurassic – Late Cretaceous, 170–66 Ma

Extinct family of lizards

Paramacellodidae is an extinct family of lizards that first appeared in the Middle Jurassic around 170 million years ago (Ma) and became extinct at the end of the Cretaceous around 66 Ma. It was one of the earliest groups of lizards to have undergone an evolutionary radiation, with members found across the supercontinent Laurasia. The phylogenetic relationships and constituent species of Paramacellodidae are uncertain. Many studies regard them to be scincomorphs, a large group that includes skinks and their closest extinct relatives, and possibly also to Cordyoidea, a group that includes spinytail lizards and relatives. Like modern skinks, paramacelloidids had rectangular bony plates called osteoderms covering most of their bodies, including their backs, undersides, and tails. They also had short and robust limbs. A 2026 phylogenetic analysis constrained to match the phylogeny of living squamates based on genetics instead found paramacellodids to be an early independent branch within Squamata, diverging prior to the split between Scincoidea, Lacertoidea and Toxicofera. Paramacellodids are distinguished from other lizards by the combination two traits in their dentition, the teeth are labiolingually expanded at their bases, and the tooth apices are lingually concave.

The family was named in 1983 to include two well-known genera, Paramacellodus and Becklesius, from the Late Jurassic and Early Cretaceous of Europe. A third genus, Sharovisaurus, was named in 1984 from the Late Jurassic of Kazakhstan, and a fourth, Mimobecklesisaurus, in 1985 from the Late Jurassic of China. Remains of Paramacellodus were later described from the Morrison Formation in Utah. Possible paramacellodid remains have also been found in Late Cretaceous deposits in Mongolia, as well as the Late Jurassic Tendaguru Formation in Tanzania, which would indicate that the family was also present in Gondwana. In 2020, this was confirmed with the discovery of the first paramacellodid from Brazil, Neokotus sanfranciscanus, from the Early Cretaceous Sanfranciscana Basin. Three other early scincomorphs—Pseudosaurillus, Saurillodon, and Saurillus—have also commonly been referred to Paramacellodidae, although some recent phylogenetic studies find them to be non-paramacellodid scincomorphs. Collectively, paramacellodids and taxa formerly referred to Paramacellodidae may represent a paraphyletic grade of basal scincomorphs closely related to Scincoidea. In 2002, the newly named genus Atokasaurus from the Early Cretaceous Antlers Formation in Oklahoma was described as a "paramacellodid-grade" scincomorph to reflect this phylogenetic ambiguity. In the Late Cretaceous, paramacellodids are only known from the European Archipelago.
