= Globauridae =

Globauridae Temporal range: Late Jurassic to Late Cretaceous

Scientific classification
- Domain: Eukaryota
- Kingdom: Animalia
- Phylum: Chordata
- Class: Reptilia
- Order: Squamata
- Superfamily: †Ardeosauroidea
- Family: †Globauridae; Alifanov, 2000

Genera
- †Durotrigia; †Globaura; †Khereidia; †Meyasaurus; †Tijubina

Extinct family of lizards

Globauridae is a family of extinct scincomorph lizards that first appeared in the Late Jurassic of England and persisting until the Late Cretaceous of Mongolia. The group is distinguished by having a diploglossopalatinar palate anatomy, lacking osteoderms, having conical two- or three-cusped teeth, and a unique postorbital-parietal contact. The type genus Globaura was originally classified within the now-polyphyletic group Lacertoidea, before being reclassified within its own family within Ardeosauroidea. However, Meyasaurus has also been found to be closer to Barbatteiidae.
