= Paramacellodus =

Paramacellodus Temporal range: Kimmeridgian–Berriasian

Scientific classification
- Domain: Eukaryota
- Kingdom: Animalia
- Phylum: Chordata
- Class: Reptilia
- Order: Squamata
- Family: †Paramacellodidae
- Genus: †Paramacellodus; Hoffstetter, 1967

Type species
- †Paramacellodus oweni Hoffstetter, 1967

Extinct genus of lizards

Paramacellodus is an extinct genus of scincomorph lizards from the Early Cretaceous of England and France, and the Late Jurassic of Portugal and the western United States. The type species, Paramacellodus oweni, was named in 1967 from the earliest Cretaceous (Berriasian) Purbeck Group in Dorset, England. Additional material referable to a species of Paramacellodus, possibly P. oweni, has been described from the Morrison Formation, specifically in Como Bluff, Wyoming, and Dinosaur National Monument, Utah. An indeterminate species is known from the Berriasian aged Angeac-Charente bonebed in France. Paramacellodus belongs to an extinct family of scincomorphs called Paramacellodidae, which spanned most of Laurasia during the Late Jurassic and Early Cretaceous and represented one of the earliest evolutionary radiations of lizards.

== See also ==
- Paleobiota of the Morrison Formation
