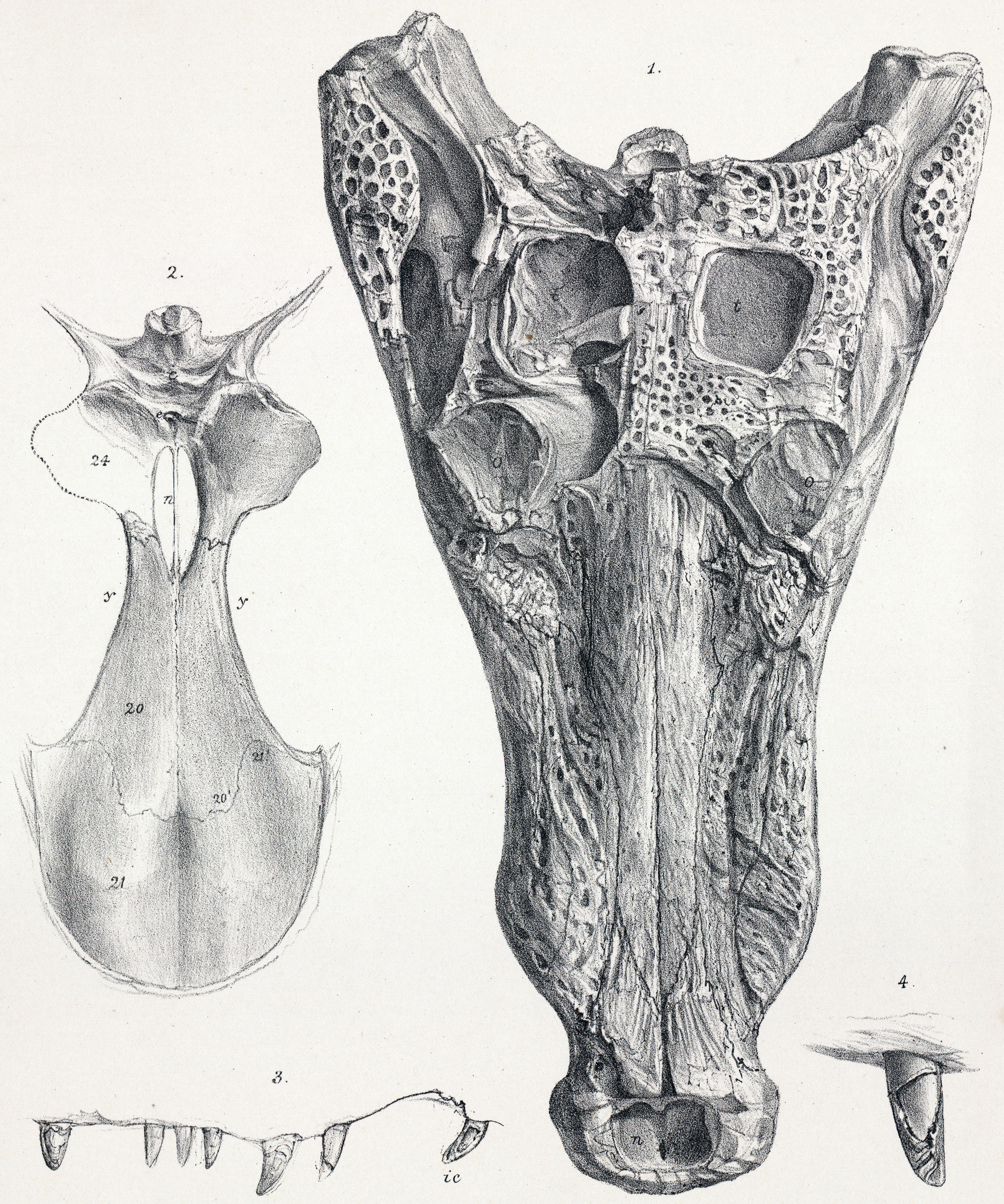
- Skull of Goniopholis simus

Scientific classification
- Domain: Eukaryota
- Kingdom: Animalia
- Phylum: Chordata
- Class: Reptilia
- Clade: Archosauria
- Clade: Pseudosuchia
- Clade: Crocodylomorpha
- Clade: Neosuchia
- Clade: †Coelognathosuchia; Martin et al., 2014

Families
- †Goniopholididae; †Pholidosauridae

= Coelognathosuchia =

Coelognathosuchia Temporal range: Early Jurassic (Sinemurian) - Late Cretaceous (Maastrichtian, 196–66 Ma

Extinct clade of reptiles

Coelognathosuchia is an extinct clade of neosuchian crocodyliforms that includes all taxa more closely related to the family Pholidosauridae than to Bernissartia fagesii or Eusuchia. Martin et al. (2014) named the clade after finding goniopholidids and pholidosaurids to group together in their phylogenetic analysis of crocodyliform evolutionary relationships. In their analysis, Pholidosauridae was monophyletic and Goniopholididae was paraphyletic, being an assemblage of successively more basal taxa within Coelognathosuchia. Coelognathosuchia itself was positioned near the base of the larger clade Neosuchia as the sister group to a clade containing the Early Cretaceous neosuchian Bernissartia and Eusuchia, the group that includes all modern crocodilians and their closest extinct relatives.

Martin et al. named Coelognathosuchia from the Greek κοῖλος (koĩlos, "concave"), γνάθος (gnáthos, "jaw") and σοῦχος (soũchos, "crocodile"), after a small depression on the surface of the skull between the maxilla and jugal bones in both goniopholidids and pholidosaurs. Other diagnostic features of Coelognathosuchia include orbits (eye sockets) that are narrower than the frontal bone that separates them and smaller than the supratemporal fenestrae (two holes at the back of the skull roof) behind them, a notch between the premaxilla and maxilla at the tip of the snout, and the reduction or absence of the antorbital fenestrae (a pair of holes in the snout in front of each orbit).

A close relationship between Goniopholididae and Pholidosauridae conflicts with the hypothesis that pholidosaurids are instead more closely related to the family Dyrosauridae. This alternate phylogeny was found in many analyses, including Jouve et al. (2006), Pol and Gasparini (2009), and de Andrade et al. (2011), who named the clade Tethysuchia. In both studies, Goniopholididae was found to be a more distantly related clade within Neosuchia. In their description of Pholidosaurus specimens from southwestern France, Martin and colleagues reiterated their opinion that Dyrosauridae is not as closely related to Pholidosauridae as stated by previous authors by pointing to numerous shared characters between the Cherves-de-Cognac pholidosaurid remains and Goniopholididae.
