= Becklesius =

Becklesius Temporal range: Late Jurassic - Late Cretaceous Kimmeridgian–Maastrichtian

Scientific classification
- Domain: Eukaryota
- Kingdom: Animalia
- Phylum: Chordata
- Class: Reptilia
- Order: Squamata
- Family: †Paramacellodidae
- Genus: †Becklesius; Estes, 1983

Type species
- †Becklesisaurus hoffstetteri Seiffert, 1975

Other species
- †Becklesius cataphractus Richter, 1994 †Becklesius nopcsai Folie and Codrea 2005

Extinct genus of lizards

Becklesius is an extinct genus of Paramacellodid lizard known from the Late Jurassic to Late Cretaceous of Europe, the type species, B. hoffstetteri is known from Kimmeridgian aged sediments of the Alcobaça Formation in Portugal. An indeterminate species is known from Berriasian aged sediments of the Lulworth Formation in the UK. Another species B. cataphractus is known the Barremian aged sediments of the Una locality, part of the La Huérguina Formation, Spain. A third species, B. nopcsai is known from the Late Cretaceous (Maastrichtian) Sânpetru Formation of Romania.
