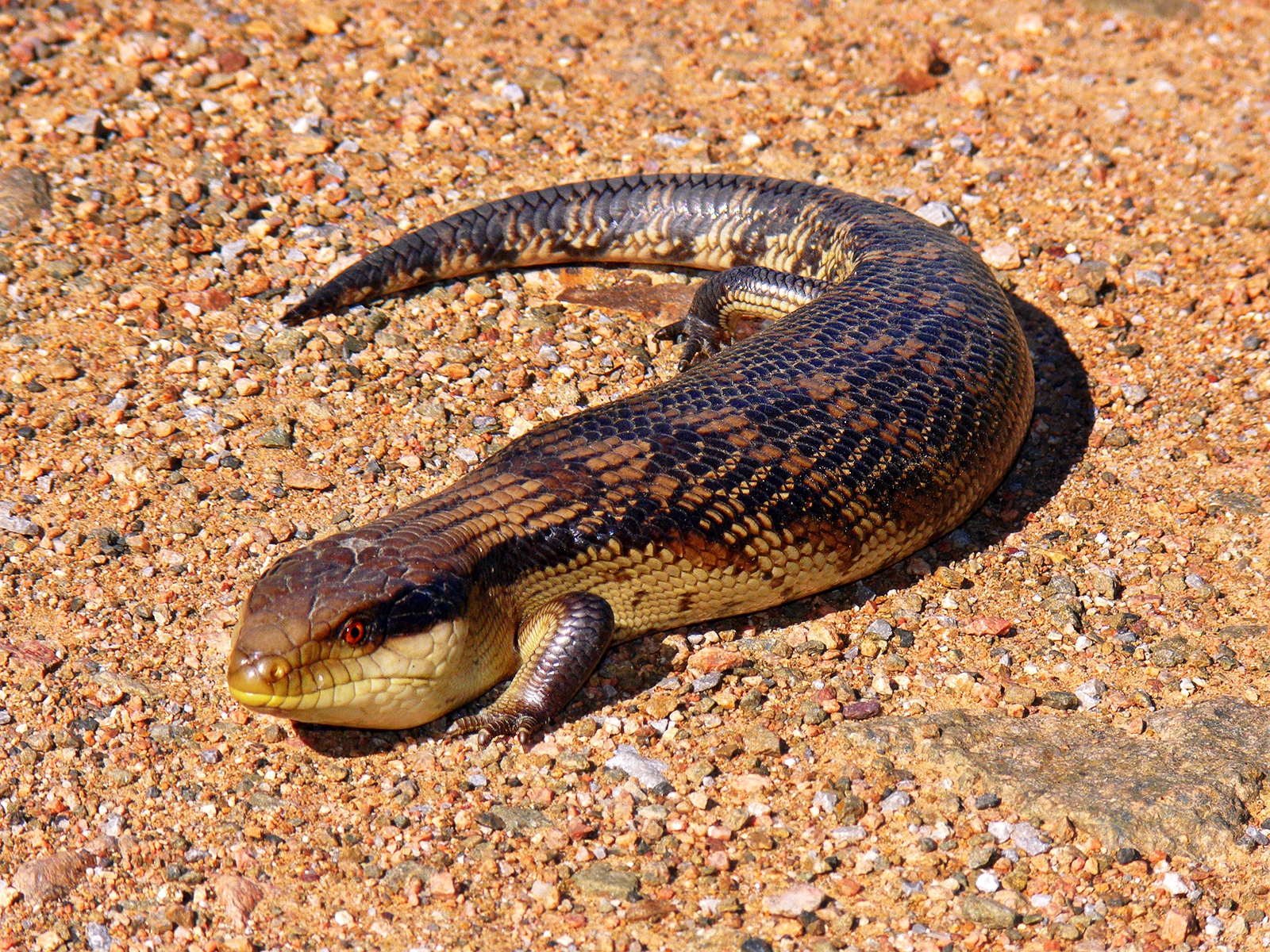
- Eastern blue-tongued lizard

Scientific classification
- Kingdom: Animalia
- Phylum: Chordata
- Class: Reptilia
- Order: Squamata
- Infraorder: Scincomorpha; Camp, 1923

Subgroups
- Scincidae; Xantusiomorpha; †Retinosaurus; †Eoxantidae; †Hodzhakuliidae; †Slavoiidae; Xantusiidae; †Ardeosauroidea?; †Ardeosauridae?; †Carusiidae?; †Globauridae?; †Paramacellodidae; Cordyliformes; Cordylidae; Gerrhosauridae; †Deccansaurus?

= Scincomorpha =

Scincomorphs Temporal range: Middle Jurassic—present, 170–0 Ma

Infraorder of lizards

Scincomorpha is an infraorder and clade of lizards including skinks (Scincidae) and their close relatives. These include the living families Cordylidae (girdled lizards), Gerrhosauridae (plated lizards), and Xantusiidae (night lizards), as well as many extinct taxa. Other roughly equivalent terms include the suborder Scinciformata, or the superfamily Scincoidea, though different authors use these terms in a broader or more restricted usage relative to true skinks. They first appear in the fossil record about 170 million years ago, during the Jurassic period.

== Systematics ==
Alifanov (2016) found the following phylogeny with morphological data: Note that Dibamidae was included, unlike in analyses with molecular data.

- Scincomorpha
  - Xantusiomorpha
    - Xantusiidae
    - - Dibamidae
      - - - †Eoxantidae
          - - †Slavoiidae
            - †Hodzhakuliidae
  - Leptoglossa
    - Ardeosauroidea
      - †Globauridae
      - - †Ardeosauridae
        - †Carusiidae
    - - - †Paramacellodidae
        - Cordylidae
      - - Acontidae
        - Scincidae

Alternatively, Zheng & Wiens (2016) found the following phylogeny of extant groups using molecular data; this phylogeny has largely been supported through other studies using molecular evidence:

- Scincoidea
  - Scincidae
  - - Xantusiidae
    - Cordyliformes
      - Cordylidae
      - Gerrhosauridae

There are many characteristics that are shared upon all skinks. All skinks have very cone shaped heads with large, symmetrical, and shield-like scales. Their scales are smooth, glossy, and circular all throughout their body. Once you get to their back and belly areas, they have more round scales that overlap like roof shingles. Their bodies are cylindrical in their cross section and have body scales that have bony plates underneath them called "osteoderms". Osteoderms are dermal bone structures that support the upper layer of skin and serve as protection against the elements in a large variety of extinct and extant organisms, especially reptiles. This structure is commonly called "dermal armor" and serves to protect the organism, while also helping with temperature regulation. The roofs of their mouths are made up of two bony plates instead of one. One of their bony plates is called a palate and the other bony palate in the roof of their mouth separates the respiratory and digestive passages. They also have very long tapering tails with small legs and five toes.

For their distribution, there are around 1,275 species of skinks all around the world. They are very popular and can be mostly found in Southeast Asia, most areas of Australia, and temperate regions of North America. There are also desert species skinks that are called "sand swimmers" that are found in Florida. Five-lined skinks are very popular throughout Georgia and North Carolina, they are found in very wooded areas and like to hide in fallen trees. Skinks are more abundant and endangered in Africa and Indo Australia because of predators and loss of habitat. Another very popular area is New Zealand, the pale-flecked garden sunskink (Lampropholis guichenoti) is very common. They are also found in the suburban gardens in Auckland. Some skink species are more terrestrial and fossorial, some arboreal meaning tree-dwelling, and others are semiaquatic.
